= 2012 Council of the District of Columbia election =

US Election

- November 6, 2012

7 seats on the Council of the District of Columbia 7 seats needed for a majority
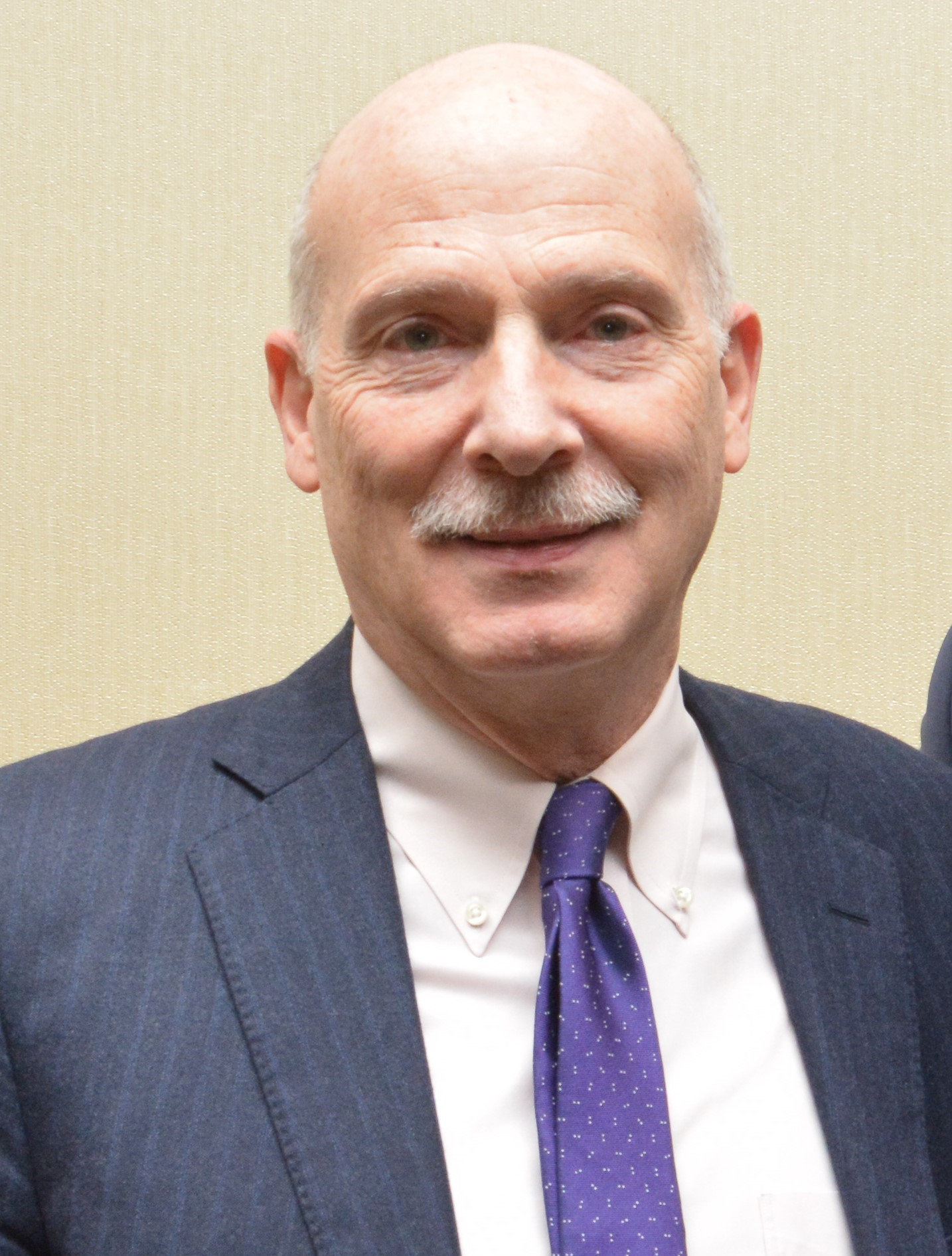

	Majority party	Minority party
Leader	Phil Mendelson
Party	Democratic	Independent
Last election	11	2
Seats after	11	2
Seat change	Steady	Steady
Chair of the Council before election
Phil Mendelson
(interim)
Democratic
Elected Chair of the Council
Phil Mendelson
Democratic

The 2012 Council of the District of Columbia election was held on November 6, 2012, with primaries held on April 3. Elections were held in four of the eight wards, two at-large seats (one open to any party and one open to non-majority parties) as well as a special election for the Chair of the Council of the District of Columbia. Prior to the election, 11 seats were held by Democrats and 2 seats were held by Independents. The general election saw no party flip any seats, thereby meaning that Democrats retained their majority on the council.

== Background ==
The council is composed of thirteen members, each elected by district residents to a four-year term. One member is elected from each of the district's eight wards. Four at-large members represent the district as a whole. The chairman of the council is likewise elected at an at-large basis. The terms of the at-large members are staggered so that two are elected every two years, and each D.C. resident may vote for two different at-large candidates in each general election.

According to the Home Rule Act, of the chair and the at-large members, a maximum of three may be affiliated with the majority political party. In the council's electoral history, of the elected members who were not affiliated with the majority party, most were elected as at-large members. In 2008 and 2012, Democrats such as David Grosso, Elissa Silverman, and Michael A. Brown changed their party affiliation to Independent when running for council.

To become a candidate for council an individual must be resident of the District of Columbia for at least one year prior to the general election, a registered voter, and hold no other public office for which compensation beyond expenses is received. Candidates running for a ward position must be a resident of that ward.

== Summary ==
Democrats remained the largest party on the council. At-large councilmember Phil Mendelson was appointed by the rest of the council to serve as interim chairman following the resignation of incumbent chairman Kwame R. Brown due to a federal indictment. All ward-level councilmembers won re-election, facing little opposition in the general election.

=== At-large ===
Position	Incumbent				Candidates
Position	Member	Party	First elected	Status	Candidates
At-large	Vincent Orange	Democratic	2011 (special)	Incumbent re-elected.	▌ ✓ Vincent Orange 38.4%; ▌ ✓ David Grosso 20.2%; ▌ Michael A. Brown 15.0%; ▌ Mary Brooks Beatty 7.2%; ▌ A. J. Cooper 6.5%; ▌ Leon J. Swain Jr. 6.4%; ▌ Ann C. Wilcox 5.9%
At-large	Michael A. Brown	Independent	2008	Incumbent lost re-election. New member elected.	▌ ✓ Vincent Orange 38.4%; ▌ ✓ David Grosso 20.2%; ▌ Michael A. Brown 15.0%; ▌ Mary Brooks Beatty 7.2%; ▌ A. J. Cooper 6.5%; ▌ Leon J. Swain Jr. 6.4%; ▌ Ann C. Wilcox 5.9%

=== Wards ===
Position	Incumbent				Candidates
Position	Member	Party	First elected	Status	Candidates
Ward 2	Jack Evans	Democratic	1991 (special)	Incumbent re-elected	▌ ✓ Jack Evans 96.9%
Ward 4	Muriel Bowser	Democratic	2006	Incumbent re-elected	▌ ✓ Muriel Bowser 97.3%
Ward 7	Yvette Alexander	Democratic	2007 (special)	Incumbent re-elected	▌ ✓ Yvette Alexander 87.0%; ▌ Ron Moten 12.2%
Ward 8	Marion Barry	Democratic	2004 (special)	Incumbent re-elected	▌ ✓ Marion Barry 88.0%; ▌ Jauhar Abraham 11.6%

== Chairperson ==
Interim Chairperson Phil Mendelson won the special election for chairperson, facing only one opponent.

2012 District of Columbia Chairperson of the Council special election
- November 6, 2012
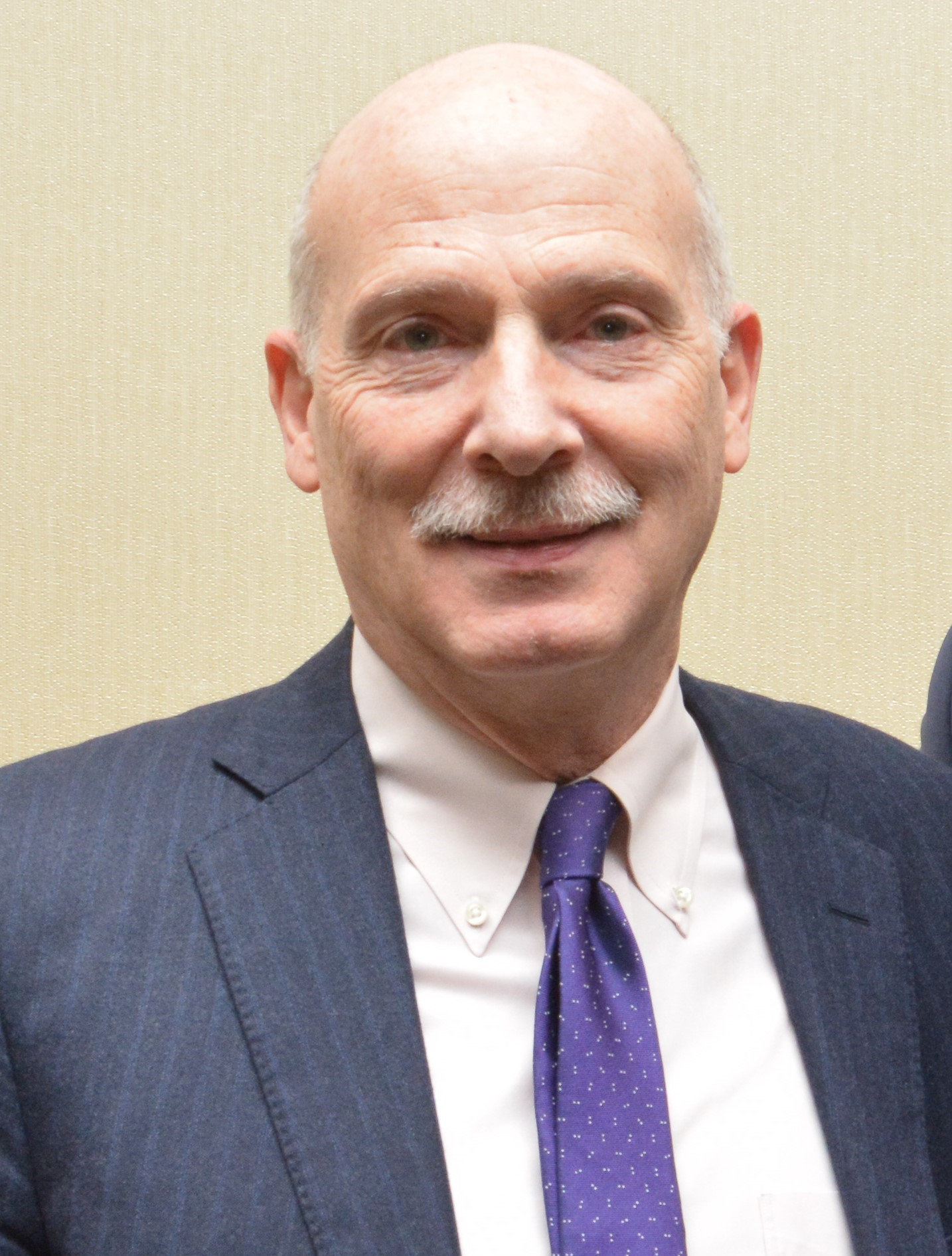

Nominee	Phil Mendelson	Calvin H. Gurley
Party	Democratic	Democratic
Popular vote	174,742	69,342
Percentage	70.72%	28.06%
Chairperson before election
Phil Mendelson
(interim)
Democratic
Elected Chairperson
Phil Mendelson
Democratic

=== Candidates ===
- Calvin H. Gurley (Democrat)
- Phil Mendelson (Democrat), interim chairperson from Eastern Market

Endorsements

Phil Mendelson

Labor unions

- Maryland American Federation of Teachers

Organizations

- Greater Greater Washington
- National Nurses United
- Sierra Club

Publications

- The Washington Post

=== General election ===
2012 Council of the District of Columbia Chairperson special election
Party	Candidate	Votes	%
Democratic	Phil Mendelson (inc.)	174,742	70.72%
Democratic	Calvin H. Gurley	69,342	28.06%
Write-in		3,017	1.22%
Total votes		247,101	100%

== At-large ==
2012 Council of the District of Columbia At-large election
- November 6, 2012
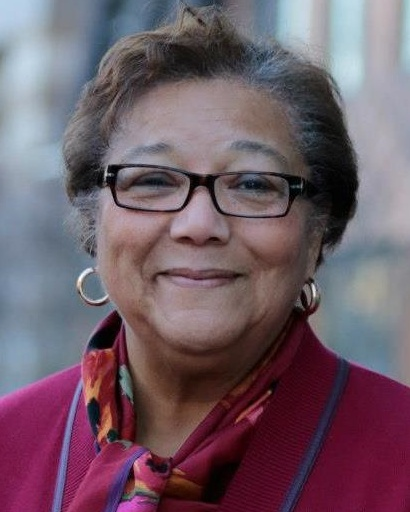

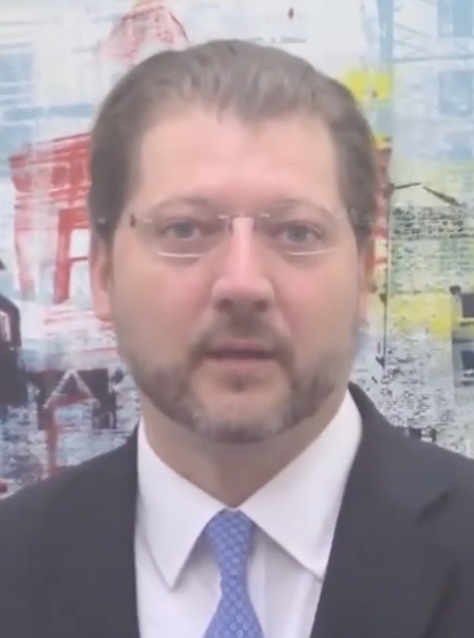

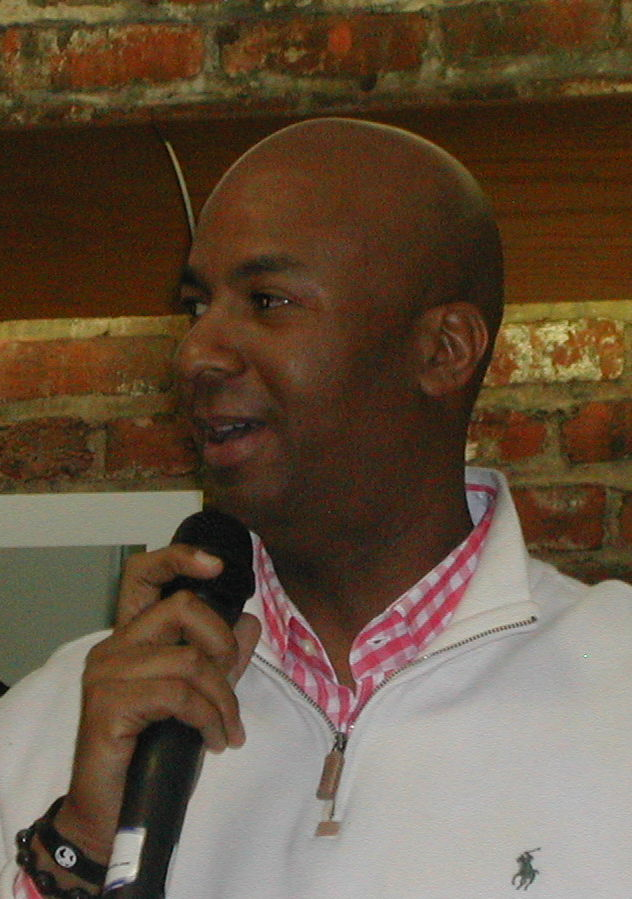

Nominee	Vincent Orange	David Grosso	Michael A. Brown
Party	Democratic	Independent	Independent
Popular vote	148,595	78,123	57,762
Percentage	38.38%	20.18%	14.92%
Nominee	Mary Brooks Beatty	A. J. Cooper	Leon J. Swain, Jr.
Party	Republican	Independent	Independent
Popular vote	27,847	25,012	24,588
Percentage	7.19%	6.46%	6.35%
Councilmembers before election
Vincent Orange (Dem.)
Michael A. Brown (Ind.)
Elected Councilmembers
Vincent Orange (Dem.)
David Grosso (Ind.)

Incumbent Democrat Vincent Orange won re-election to his first full term after his victory in the 2011 special election. Independent incumbent Michael A. Brown lost his seat to David Grosso following a string of corruption scandals.

=== Democratic primary ===
Candidates

- Sekou Biddle, former At-large councilmember
- E. Gail Anderson Holness, ANC member
- Vincent Orange, incumbent At-large Councilmember
- Peter Shapiro, former Prince George's County Council member

Endorsements

Sekou Biddle

Local officials

- David Catania, incumbent independent At-large Councilmember
- Patrick Mara, former Republican candidate for At-large seat and Ward 1 member of the District of Columbia State Board of Education
- Tommy Wells, incumbent Ward 6 Councilmember

Organizations

- Sierra Club (Democratic primary)

Publications

- Washington City Paper (Democratic primary)
- The Washington Post (Democratic primary)
Peter Shapiro

Organizations

- Greater Greater Washington
Vincent Orange

Labor unions

- AFSCME Local 20
- AFL-CIO Metropolitan Washington Council
- LiUNA Local 657
- Maryland American Federation of Teachers
- SEIU Local 722
- Washington Teachers Union

Organizations

- District of Columbia Chamber of Commerce
- National Nurses United

Publications

- Washington Examiner

Debates

Debates and forums for At-large Democratic primary candidates
Date	Place	Host	Participants			
P Participant. I Invitee. A Absent. N Confirmed non-invitee. O Out of race (exploring, suspended, or not yet entered)			Biddle	Holness	Orange	Shapiro
23 February 2012	St. Columba’s Episcopal Church	Ward 3 Democrats	P	P	P	P

2012 Council of the District of Columbia At-large Democratic primary
Party	Candidate	Votes	%
Democratic	Vincent Orange (inc.)	43,586	53.25%
Democratic	Nate Bennett-Fleming	18,232	22.27%
Democratic	John F. Settles II	10,775	13.16%
Democratic	Pedro Rubio	6,082	7.43%
Democratic	Kevin Valentine Jr.	2,560	3.13%
Write-in		624	1.42%
Total votes		81,859	100%

=== Republican primary ===
Candidates

- Mary Brooks Beatty

2012 Council of the District of Columbia At-large Republican primary
Party	Candidate	Votes	%
Republican	Mary Brooks Beatty	4,282	96.27%
Write-in		166	3.73%
Total votes		4,448	100%

=== Statehood Green primary ===
Candidates

- G. Lee Aikin
- Ann C. Wilcox

Endorsements

Ann C. Wilcox

Organizations

- Sierra Club

2012 Council of the District of Columbia At-large Statehood Green primary
Party	Candidate	Votes	%
DC Statehood Green	Ann C. Wilcox	223	63.35%
DC Statehood Green	G. Lee Aikin	85	24.15%
Write-in		44	12.50%
Total votes		352	100%

=== Independents ===
Candidates

- Michael A. Brown
- A. J. Cooper
- David Grosso
- Leon J. Swain Jr.

Endorsements

Michael A. Brown

Labor unions

- Maryland American Federation of Teachers
David Grosso

Local officials

- Tommy Wells

Organizations

- Greater Greater Washington
- Sierra Club

Publications

- The Washington Post
Leon J. Swain Jr.

Publications

- The Washington Post

=== General Election ===
2012 Council of the District of Columbia At-large election
Party	Candidate	Votes	%
Democratic	Vincent Orange (inc.)	148,595	38.38%
Independent	David Grosso	78,123	20.18%
Independent	Michael A. Brown (inc.)	57,762	14.92%
Republican	Mary Brooks Beatty	27,847	7.19%
Independent	A. J. Cooper	25,012	8.14%
Independent	Leon J. Swain Jr.	24,588	6.35%
DC Statehood Green	Ann C. Wilcox	22,802	5.89%
Write-in		2,402	0.62%
Total votes		387,131	100%

== Ward 2 ==
2012 District of Columbia Ward 2 Election
- November 6, 2012
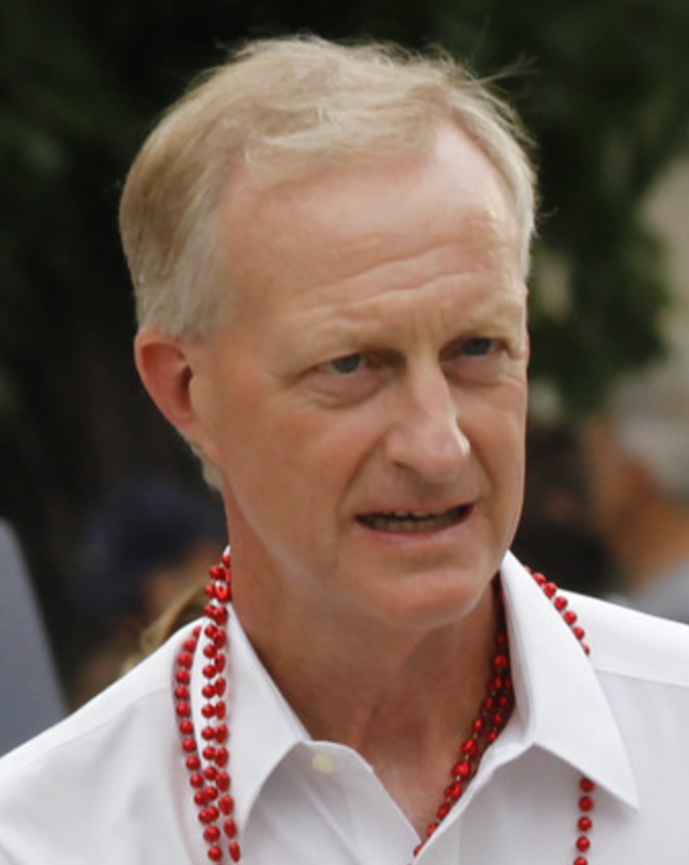
Nominee	Jack Evans
Party	Democratic
Popular vote	23,414
Percentage	96.86%
Councilmember before election
Jack Evans
Democratic
Elected Councilmember
Jack Evans
Democratic

Incumbent councilmember Jack Evans cruised to victory, facing no opponents in either the primary or general election.

=== Democratic primary ===
Candidates

- Jack Evans, incumbent Ward 2 Councilmember

Endorsements

Jack Evans

Labor unions

- Maryland American Federation of Teachers
- Service Employees International Union Local 32BJ

Organizations

- Gay and Lesbian Activists Alliance
- National Nurses United
- Sierra Club

Publications

- The Washington Post

2012 Council of the District of Columbia Ward 2 Democratic primary
Party	Candidate	Votes	%
Democratic	Jack Evans (inc.)	2,947	92.27%
Write-in		247	7.73%
Total votes		3,194	100%

=== General Election ===
2012 Council of the District of Columbia Ward 2 election
Party	Candidate	Votes	%
Democratic	Jack Evans (inc.)	23,414	96.86%
Write-in		760	3.14%
Total votes		24,174	100%

== Ward 4 ==
2012 District of Columbia Ward 4 Election
- November 6, 2012
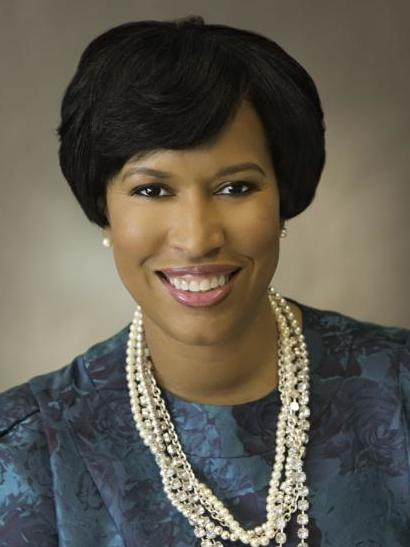
Nominee	Muriel Bowser
Party	Democratic
Popular vote	33,045
Percentage	97.25%
Councilmember before election
Muriel Bowser
Democratic
Elected Councilmember
Muriel Bowser
Democratic

Incumbent councilmember Muriel Bowser easily defeated a crowded primary field before winning an uncontested general election.

=== Democratic primary ===
Candidates

- Muriel Bowser, incumbent Ward 4 Councilmember
- Renee L. Bowser
- Calvin H. Gurley, perennial candidate
- Baruti Jahi
- Judi Jones
- Max Skolnik

Endorsements

Muriel Bowser

Labor unions

- Maryland American Federation of Teachers
- Service Employees International Union Local 32BJ

Organizations

- Sierra Club

Publications

- Washington City Paper
- The Washington Post

2012 Council of the District of Columbia Ward 4 Democratic primary
Party	Candidate	Votes	%
Democratic	Muriel Bowser (inc.)	7,541	66.17%
Democratic	Renee L. Bowser	1,523	13.36%
Democratic	Max Skolnik	1,042	9.14%
Democratic	Baruti Jahi	619	5.43%
Democratic	Judi Jones	371	3.26%
Democratic	Calvin H. Gurley	268	2.35%
Write-in		32	0.28%
Total votes		11,396	100%

=== General Election ===
2012 Council of the District of Columbia Ward 4 election
Party	Candidate	Votes	%
Democratic	Muriel Bowser (inc.)	33,045	97.25%
Write-in		933	2.75%
Total votes		33,978	100%

== Ward 7 ==
2012 District of Columbia Ward 7 Election
- November 6, 2012
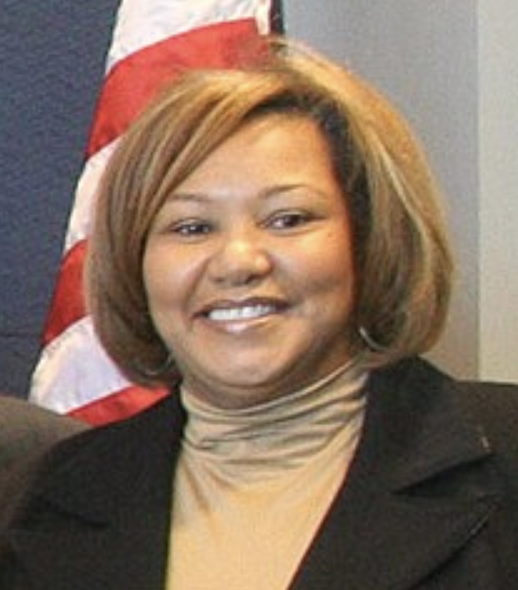

Nominee	Yvette Alexander	Ron Moten
Party	Democratic	Republican
Popular vote	29,056	4,074
Percentage	86.96%	12.19%
Councilmember before election
Yvette Alexander
Democratic
Elected Councilmember
Yvette Alexander
Democratic

Incumbent councilmember Yvette Alexander won a contested primary before beating local community activist Ron Moten in the general election

=== Democratic primary ===
Candidates

- Yvette Alexander, incumbent Ward 7 Councilmember
- William Bennett II, minister from Deanwood
- Tom Brown, education executive and former teacher
- Kevin B. Chavous, lawyer and son of former councilmember Kevin P. Chavous
- Dorothy Douglas, activist and member of the District of Columbia State Board of Education
- Monica L. Johnson

Endorsements

Yvette Alexander

Labor unions

- Maryland American Federation of Teachers

Organizations

- National Nurses United
- Sierra Club
Tom Brown

Labor unions

- AFL-CIO Metropolitan Washington Council

Organizations

- DC for Democracy
- District of Columbia Chamber of Commerce
- Gay and Lesbian Activists Alliance
- Greater Greater Washington

Publications

- Washington City Paper
- Washington Examiner
- The Washington Post

2012 Council of the District of Columbia Ward 7 Democratic primary
Party	Candidate	Votes	%
Democratic	Yvette Alexander (inc.)	3,730	42.38%
Democratic	Tom Brown	1,950	22.16%
Democratic	Kevin B. Chavous	1,916	21.77%
Democratic	William Bennett II	892	10.14%
Democratic	Dorothy Douglas	192	2.18%
Democratic	Monica L. Johnson	73	0.83%
Write-in		48	0.55%
Total votes		8,801	100%

=== Republican primary ===
Candidates

- Don Folden Sr.
- Ron Moten, community political activist

Endorsements

Ron Moten

Labor Unions Publications

- The Washington Post (General election)

2012 Council of the District of Columbia Ward 7 Republican primary
Party	Candidate	Votes	%
Republican	Ron Moten	68	61.26%
Republican	Don Folden Sr.	31	27.93%
Write-in		12	10.81%
Total votes		111	100%

=== General Election ===
Debates

Debates and forums for Ward 7 candidates
Date	Place	Host	Participants							
P Participant. I Invitee. A Absent. N Confirmed non-invitee. O Out of race (exploring, suspended, or not yet entered)			Alexander	Bennett II	Brown	Chavous	Douglas	Folden Sr.	Johnson	Moten
16 February 2012	Langston Golf Course	Langston Community Association	P	P	P	P	P	P	P	P

2012 Council of the District of Columbia Ward 7 election
Party	Candidate	Votes	%
Democratic	Yvette Alexander (inc.)	29,056	86.96%
Republican	Ron Moten	4,074	12.19%
Write-in		283	0.85%
Total votes		33,413	100%

== Ward 8 ==
2012 District of Columbia Ward 8 Election
- November 6, 2012
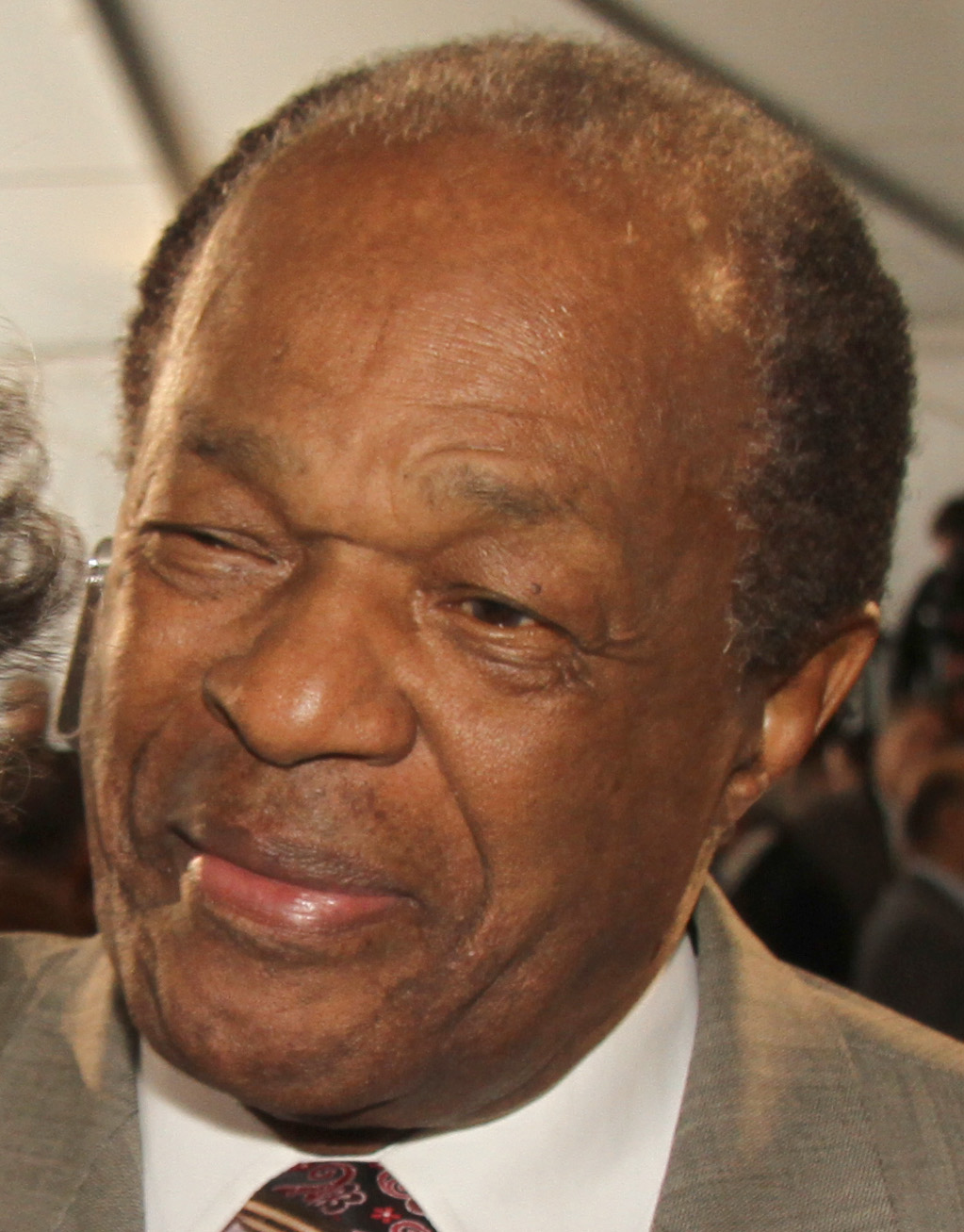

Nominee	Marion Barry	Jauhar Abraham
Party	Democratic	Independent
Popular vote	27,202	3,588
Percentage	87.98%	11.61%
Councilmember before election
Marion Barry
Democratic
Elected Councilmember
Marion Barry
Democratic

Incumbent councilmember Marion Barry easily won a contested primary en route to his final term on the council before his death in office in 2015.

=== Democratic primary ===
Candidates

- Marion Barry, incumbent Ward 8 Councilmember
- Darrell Gaston
- Jacque D. Patterson
- Sandra Seegars
- Natalie Williams

Endorsements

Marion Barry

Labor unions

- Maryland American Federation of Teachers
- Service Employees International Union Local 32BJ
Jacque D. Patterson

Publications

- The Washington Post (Democratic primary)

2012 Council of the District of Columbia Ward 8 Democratic primary
Party	Candidate	Votes	%
Democratic	Marion Barry (inc.)	5,116	73.54%
Democratic	Jacque D. Patterson	568	8.16%
Democratic	Sandra Seegars	549	7.89%
Democratic	Natalie Williams	485	6.97%
Democratic	Darrell Gaston	219	3.15%
Write-in		20	0.29%
Total votes		6,957	100%

=== Independents ===
Candidates

- Jauhar Abraham

=== General Election ===
2012 Council of the District of Columbia Ward 8 election
Party	Candidate	Votes	%
Democratic	Marion Barry (inc.)	27,202	87.98%
Independent	Jauhar Abraham	3,588	11.61%
Write-in		127	0.85%
Total votes		30,917	100%
