= 2011 Council of the District of Columbia special election =

- April 26, 2011
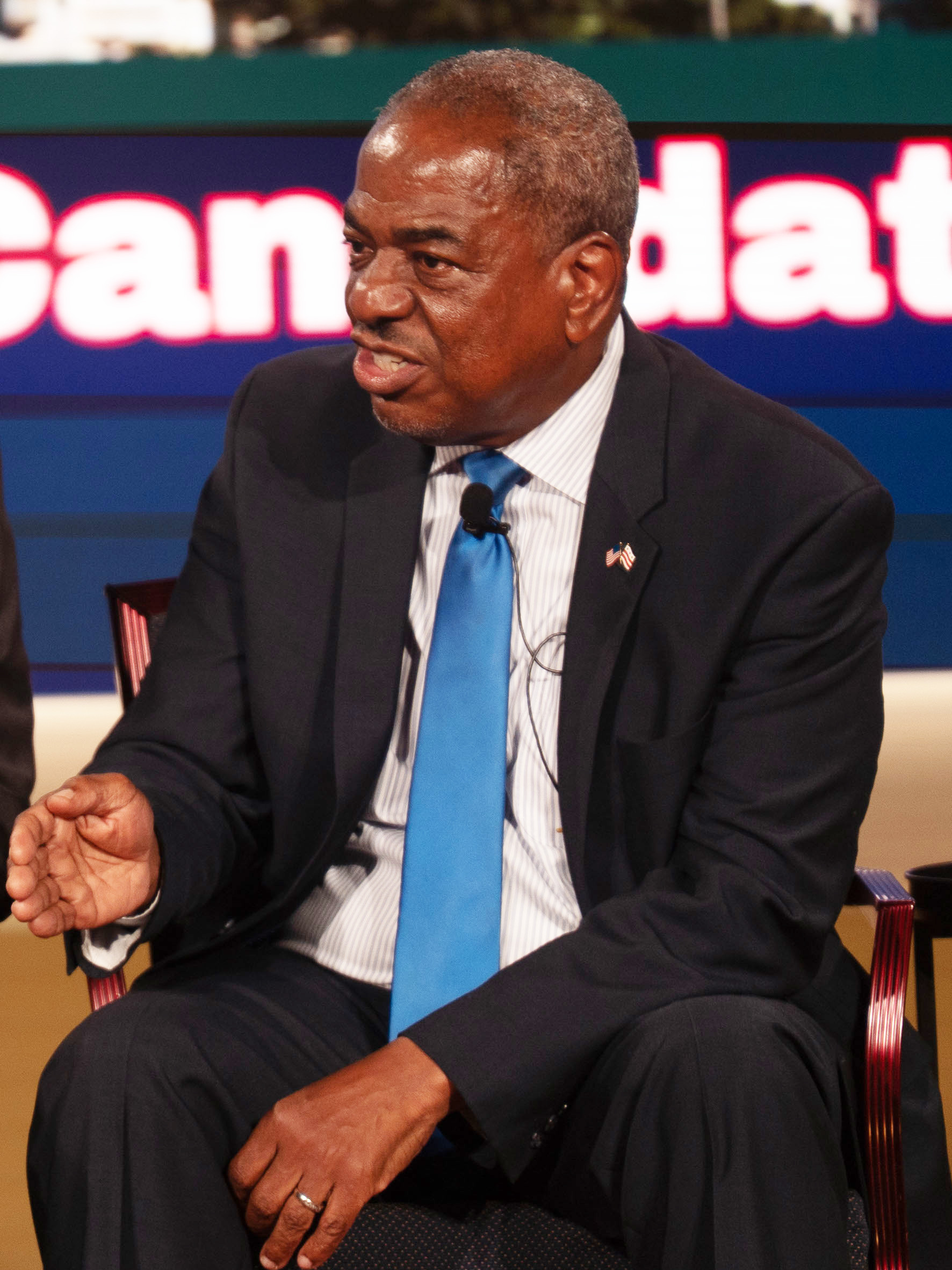

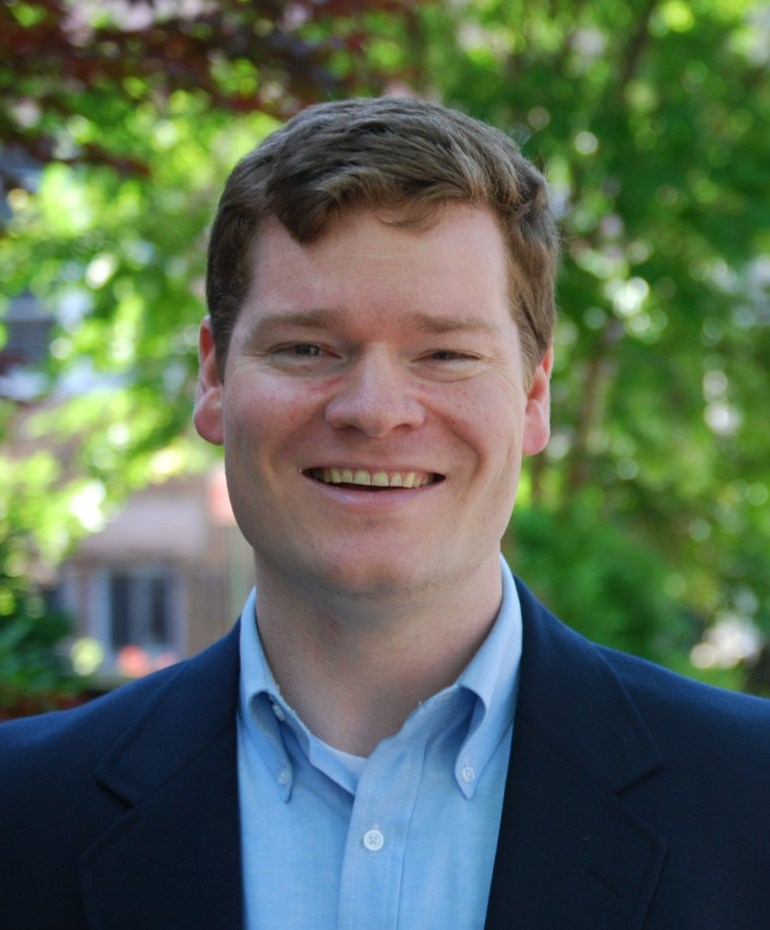

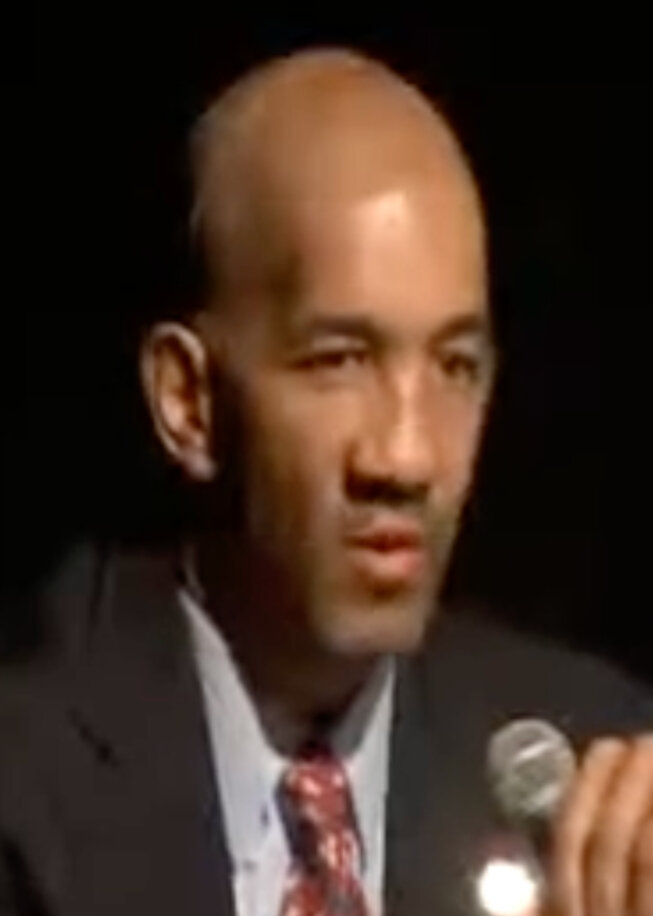

Candidate	Vincent Orange	Patrick Mara	Sekou Biddle
Party	Democratic	Republican	Democratic
Popular vote	13,583	11,851	9,373
Percentage	28.92%	25.23%	19.96%
Candidate	Bryan Weaver	Joshua Lopez	Tom Brown
Party	Democratic	Democratic	Democratic
Popular vote	6,069	3,343	1,036
Percentage	12.92%	7.12%	2.21%
Councilmember before election
Sekou Biddle
(interim)
Democratic
Elected Councilmember
Vincent Orange
Democratic

The 2011 Council of the District of Columbia special election was held on April 26, 2011 to elect one at-large member to the Council of the District of Columbia. Interim councilmember Sekou Biddle was appointed to the position by the District of Columbia Democratic State Committee following the resignation of Kwame R. Brown who had been elected chairman of the Council in the 2010 elections.

Multiple candidates challenged Biddle in the open, all-party special election.

== Background ==
=== Applied to be appointed ===
In total, 8 individuals submitted applications for Brown's seat.

== Candidates ==
=== Democratic Party ===
- Sekou Biddle, incumbent councilmember
- Tom Brown, Ward 8 activist
- Dorothy Douglas, member of the District of Columbia State Board of Education from Ward 7
- Joshua Lopez, community activist
- Vincent Orange, former Ward 5 Councilmember (1999-2007)
- Bryan Weaver, activist with at-risk youth

Disqualified

- Jacque Patterson

Endorsements

Sekou Biddle

Labor unions

- SEIU local 32BJ

Local officials

- Yvette Alexander, incumbent Ward 7 Councilmember
- Marion Barry, former Mayor of the District of Columbia and incumbent Ward 8 Councilmember
- Muriel Bowser, incumbent Ward 4 Councilmember
- Michael A. Brown, incumbent Independent At-large Councilmember
- David Catania, incumbent Independent At-large Councilmember
- Mary Cheh, incumbent Ward 3 Councilmember
- Vincent Gray, Mayor of the District of Columbia
- Harry Thomas Jr., incumbent Ward 5 Councilmember
- Tommy Wells, incumbent Ward 6 Councilmember

Organizations

- Capital Stonewall Democrats
- DC for Democracy
- Democracy for America
- Sierra Club
Vincent Orange

Labor unions

- AFL-CIO Metropolitan Washington Council
- Washington Teachers' Union
Bryan Weaver

Organizations

- DC College Democrats
- Greater Greater Washington

Publications

- The Georgetown Voice
- Washington City Paper

=== Republican Party ===
- Patrick Mara, member of the District of Columbia State Board of Education from Ward 1

Endorsements

Patrick Mara

Labor unions

- DC Police Union

Organizations

- DC Log Cabin Republicans

Publications

- The Washington Post

=== Statehood Green Party ===
- Alan Page

=== Independents ===
- Arkan Haile, lawyer

== General Election ==
2011 Council of the District of Columbia special election
Party	Candidate	Votes	%
Democratic	Vincent Orange	13,583	28.92%
Republican	Patrick Mara	11,851	25.23%
Democratic	Sekou Biddle	9,373	19.96%
Democratic	Bryan Weaver	6,069	12.92%
Democratic	Joshua Lopez	3,343	7.12%
Democratic	Tom Brown	1,036	2.21%
Democratic	Dorothy Douglas	787	1.68%
DC Statehood Green	Alan Page	610	1.30%
Independent	Arkan Haile	137	0.29%
Write-in		178	0.38%
Total votes		46,967	100%
