= Calvin H. Gurley =

American accountant

- Born: 1953 or 1954 (age 72–73)
- Education: Bowie State University _{B.S.}
- Occupation: Accountant
- Political party: Independent _{(2014−2015, 2020, 2022–)} Democratic _{(until 2014, 2015-2019, 2021-2022)}
- Children: 2
- Website: Archived version

Calvin H. Gurley is an accountant and perennial candidate living in Washington, D.C.

== Early years ==
Gurley was raised in Washington, D.C. Gurley attended Eastern High School, where he played defensive back on the football team. Gurley graduated from Bowie State University with a Bachelor of Science degree. Gurley also took graduate classes in finance at the University of the District of Columbia.

From March 1985 to September 1985, Gurley worked as a tax auditor for the District of Columbia Department of Finance and Revenue.

== Political campaigns ==
=== 1986 campaign for Mayor ===
Gurley announced his candidacy for mayor of the District of Columbia in 1986. Unemployed and living in Anacostia, Gurley ran as a Democratic candidate, challenging Marion Barry's reelection. Gurley said he was running for office so that a lifelong District resident would be in charge of the District's government. Gurley advocated for improvements to the District's prison system and housing department, and he said that Mayor Barry's leadership was "decaying".

The District of Columbia Office of Business and Economic Development opened a neighborhood revitalization office in Anacostia, in order to give low-interest loans to small businesses for upgrades to the business' outside appearance. Gurley described the office as "a solution in search of a problem". Gurley said that businesses in Anacostia needed "money" and "technical assistance" rather than a governmental agency that did little more than "filling office space".

During a scheduled debate among the mayoral candidates, Gurley called for the death penalty for drug addicts who contribute to drug overdoses of other people. The audience loudly booed him for his statement. Gurley later corrected himself, saying he meant to say he supported the death penalty for drug dealers who contribute to drug overdoses.

Gurley said that drug dealers should not be eligible for bail or parole. Gurley said he would decrease the crime rate by increasing funding for job training.

At a candidates forum in Ward 8, Gurley showed a slide show of boarded-up houses, blaming Mayor Barry for their condition. At another campaign stop, Gurley said that vacant houses should be renovated more quickly and that new housing developments should have more homes available for low- and middle-income residents.

Gurley repeated his campaign theme of "anybody but Barry". Gurley criticized Barry for sending his son to a private school. Gurley noted that public schooling was suitable for President Jimmy Carter's daughter but not for Barry's son. Gurley suggested that Barry would increase funding for public schools if his own son were attending them. Gurley said he would voluntarily take a drug test and challenged Barry to do the same.

Gurley said the most serious problem facing the District was that federal authorities had taken control of certain functions of the government of the District of Columbia due to mismanagement, resulting in what Gurley called "the loss of home rule". Gurley said that the District had not improved at all during the previous four years, with the exception of downtown.

At a meeting of the District of Columbia Ward 6 Democrats, the group decided to endorse Barry for reelection. In the straw vote, Barry received 74 percent, candidate Mattie Taylor received 16 percent, and Gurley received 9 percent. Gurley's campaign chairman, Doug McLellan, called the event a "staged event" and accused Barry's campaign of packing the meeting with his supporters. The president of the group said the straw vote was legitimate because it was publicized widely and that Gurley lost the straw vote because his campaign did not have much visibility around the ward. At meeting of the Ward 4 Democrats, the results of the straw vote were 95 percent for Barry, 4 percent for Taylor, and 1 percent for Gurley.

Barry won the primary election with 71 percent of the vote. Taylor received 20 percent, Gurley received 6 percent, and 4 percent of voters wrote in another name.

=== 1990 campaign for Mayor ===
In February 1990, Gurley announced he would run for mayor again.

At a debate held in March, Gurley advocated for a publicly funded military school for youths in order to prevent drug use. In Gurley's words, the District should "grab these kids off the street from mothers who don't care" and enroll them at the military academy.

In May, Gurley was interviewed about his mayoral campaign on WHUT's "Evening Exchange".

In August, Gurley dropped out of the race in order to run for the Ward 6 seat on the Council of the District of Columbia.

=== 1990 campaign for Council, Ward 6 ===
At the time of Gurley's candidacy to represent Ward 6 on the Council of the District of Columbia, Gurley was working as a financial accountant for the Federal Deposit Insurance Corporation.

Gurley continued to support the establishment of a public military school for youth in the District. Gurley wanted police officers to walk the streets in order to stop individuals from loitering. Gurley wanted to make sure taxis would serve the neighborhood of Anacostia so that people doing neighborhood patrols could teach children instead. Gurley wanted the District to use property confiscated in drug arrests to be used to fund drug education and prevention, additional pay for police officers, and youth-recreation projects.

Harold Brazil won with 43 percent of the vote, unseating incumbent Nadine P. Winter. Gurley received 3 percent of the vote.

=== 2004 proposed ballot initiative ===
In 2004, Gurley proposed a ballot initiative called "Mr. Bill Cosby's Age 18 House Rule".

If approved by voters, all child-support payments would end when they became 18 years old, rather than 21 years old as District law stated.

At the time, Gurley paid child support for two of his children, a 9-year-old daughter and a nearly 18-year-old son.

Gurley explained the ballot initiative, saying that "black families still carry as their commandment, is once you reach 18, you're out the house."

Gurley did not submit sufficient valid signatures to the District of Columbia Board of Elections, and the proposed ballot initiative did not appear on the ballot.

=== 2004 campaign for Democratic State Committee, Ward 4 ===
Gurley ran to represent Ward 4 on the District of Columbia Democratic State Committee in 2004.

Paul R. McKenzie won the seat with 42 percent of the vote. Gurley came in fourth place with 13 percent.

=== 2010 campaign for Mayor ===
Gurley ran for mayor in 2010. Gurley did have enough valid signatures to appear on the ballot, so he decided to run as a write-in candidate instead.

Vincent Gray won the Democratic Party primary election for mayor with 54 percent of the vote. Write-in candidates received 0.19 percent of the vote; some of these were for Gurley.

=== 2011 campaign for Council, At-large ===
==== Vote by Democratic State Committee ====
When at-large Council member Kwame R. Brown was sworn into office as chair of the Council of the District of Columbia in 2011, the District of Columbia Democratic State Committee announced an election by its members to replace Brown as interim at-large member of the council until a special election could occur. Gurley, Sekou Biddle, former Council member Vincent Orange, and several others filed to run.

At a debate before the District of Columbia Democratic State Committee, Gurley said that when companies hire people who live outside the District, it is like "genocide".

Kwame Brown endorsed Biddle for the position, as did Council members Harry Thomas Jr., Mary Cheh, Muriel Bowser, Yvette Alexander, and Marion Barry. District mayor Vincent Gray said he supported Brown's endorsement of Biddle.

On January 6, 2011, the District of Columbia Democratic State Committee voted to select Biddle as the interim at-large member of the council. Vote tallies were not publicly reported.

==== Special election ====
After the District of Columbia Democratic State Committee voted to select Sekou Biddle as the interim at-large member of the council, a special election was announced, to be held on April 26, 2011.

Gurley, Sekou Biddle, Vincent Orange, Patrick Mara, and several others filed to run.

Gurley did not appear on the ballot because he did not submit enough valid signatures to the District of Columbia Board of Elections.

=== 2012 campaign for Council, Ward 4 ===
Gurley ran for the Council again in 2012, this time to represent Ward 4.

In the Democratic Party primary election held in January 2012, Muriel Bowser won with 66 percent of the vote. Gurley came in sixth place with 2 percent of the vote.

=== 2012 campaign for Council, Chair ===
In June 2012, Kwame Brown resigned from the position of Chair of the council.

Gurley filed to run a special election for the position of Council Chair that was held in November 2012. Phil Mendelson and Gurley were the only two candidates on the ballot.

Gurley said that the District did a good job by warning the public about the dangers of Hurricane Sandy. Gurley said that the District should open a Disaster Emergency Management Assistance Office that would distribute power generators and subsidize hotel stays during emergency storms. Gurley said he would ask PEPCO to fund much of the office's cost.

Gurley reported a total of $650 of contributions to his campaign. Gurley was the only donor.

Mendelson won the special election with 71 percent of the vote. Gurley received 28 percent of the vote.

When asked by The Washington Post what Gurley did to receive 28 percent of the vote, Gurley said, "I just campaigned hard. It was just traditional grassroots campaigning. Hand to hand, face to face."

=== 2014 campaign for Council, Chair ===
Gurley filed to run again for Chair of the council in the 2014 election. Gurley and Mendelson were the only candidates on the ballot in the Democratic Party primary election.

Gurley and other candidates were invited to speak at a meeting of the Gertrude Stein Democratic Club, the largest LGBT political organization in the District. Gurley did not address any issues specific to LGBT individuals. Instead, Gurley talked about corruption and waste in the District. The group rated Gurley a zero out of a possible ten points because the group had no knowledge of Gurley's view on issues that were important to LGBT individuals.

The Fraternal Order of Police, Metropolitan Police Department Labor Committee said that Mendelson did not do enough to prevent the number of anti-LGBT hate crimes from nearly doubling between 2009 and 2011. The group asked District residents to "vote no on Phil Mendelson", but it did not actually endorse Gurley.

Mendelson won the election with 81 percent of the vote. Gurley received 18 percent of the vote.

=== 2014 campaign for Council, At-large ===
When independent Council Member David Catania decided to run for mayor rather than reelection in 2014, Gurley changed his voter registration to unaffiliated and filed to run for an at-large seat on the council.

Gurley said the District government should create and maintain its public housing. He said that the mayor should not have full control of the public school system. Gurley said that Congress was responsible for the fact that 70 percent of employees working in the District live outside of the District. If elected, he said he would introduce a bill to create a committee on housing and job development.

The District of Columbia Gay and Lesbian Activists Alliance asked each candidate to answer 12 questions about the group's issues. The Gay and Lesbian Activists Alliance graded Gurley a 2 out of a possible 10 points. Gay and Lesbian Activists Alliance described Gurley's responses as "confused rants".

Gurley's campaign reported $2,087 of contributions, including $1,812 from Gurley himself.

Gurley came in twelfth place with one percent of the total vote.

=== 2016 campaign for Council, Ward 4 ===
Gurley ran as a Democrat in the election to represent Ward 4 on the council in 2016. Brandon Todd ran for reelection. Leon Andrews and Ron Austin were also candidates.

Gurley said that Metropolitan Police Chief Cathy Lanier was "dismantling" of the department's LGBT Liaison Unit by not replacing officers who left the unit to take other assignments. Gurley blamed Todd for not addressing the issue.

Gurley and other candidates completed a questionnaire by the Gay and Lesbian Activists Alliance. The Gay and Lesbian Activists Alliance rated Gurley's responses with a score of 3.5 out of 10 points.

Todd was reelected to the council, receiving 49 percent of the vote. Gurley came in fourth place with 3 percent of the vote.

=== 2018 campaign for Council, Chair ===
Gurley ran for Chair of the council in 2018. Gurley ran against incumbent Phil Mendelson. Ed Lazere, executive director of the D.C. Fiscal Policy Institute, also ran for Chair of the council.

Gurley gave 2,677 signatures to the District of Columbia Board of Elections in when he filed to be on the election ballot. After examining many of the signatures, the Board of Elections determined that 837 of those signatures were invalid because of invalid addresses. This left Gurley with fewer than the required number of valid signatures, and Gurley's name did not appear on primary election ballots.

=== 2020 campaign for Council, At-large ===
Gurley ran as an independent for an at-large seat on the Council. He came in 19th place, receiving 0.6% of the vote.

=== 2022 campaign for Council, At-large ===
In June 2022, Gurley picked up paperwork to run as an independent for the at-large seats on the Council, running against incumbents Elissa Silverman and Anita Bonds.

== Activism ==
Between 1987 and 1988, Gurley served as the president of the Fairlawn Civic Association, where he helped establish neighborhood patrols.

Gurley served as the executive director of Mothers of Lost Sons in 1988. The group was primarily made of people whose relatives were recently murdered. The group wanted a federally sponsored military academy to be established in the District as an alternative to juvenile detention centers.

== Electoral history ==
=== 1986 primary election ===
Mayor of the District of Columbia, Democratic Party Primary Election, 1986
Party	Candidate	Votes	%
Democratic	Marion Barry Jr.	52,742	71
Democratic	Mattie Goodrum Taylor	14,588	20
Democratic	Calvin Gurley	4,747	6
Democratic	write-in	2,634	4

=== 1990 primary election ===
1990 Council of the District of Columbia, Ward 6, Democratic Party Primary Election
Party	Candidate	Votes	%
Democratic	Harold Brazil	6,078	43
Democratic	Nadine P. Winter	5,477	39
Democratic	John "Peter Bug" Matthews	953	7
Democratic	Bernard Gray	796	4
Democratic	Calvin Gurley	638	4
Democratic	Dwight Prophet	46	1

=== 2004 primary election ===
2004 District of Columbia Democratic State Committee, Ward 4, Election
Party	Candidate	Votes	%
Democratic	Paul R. McKenzie	6,812	42
Democratic	Charles Gaither	3,947	24
Democratic	George W. Fenderson	3,402	21
Democratic	Calvin Gurley	2,095	13

=== 2010 primary election ===
2010 Mayor of the District of Columbia, Democratic Party Primary Election
Party	Candidate	Votes	%
Democratic	Vincent C. Gray	72,648	54
Democratic	Adrian Fenty	59,524	45
Democratic	Leo Alexander	908	1
Democratic	Ernest E. Johnson	317	0
Democratic	write-in, including Calvin H. Gurley	248	0
Democratic	Sulaimon Brown	209	0

=== 2012 primary election ===
2012 Council of the District of Columbia, Ward 4, Democratic Party Primary Election
Party	Candidate	Votes	%
Democratic	Muriel Bowser	7,541	66
Democratic	Renee L. Bowser	1,523	13
Democratic	Max Skolnik	1,042	9
Democratic	Baruti Jahi	619	5
Democratic	Judi Jones	371	3
Democratic	Calvin Gurley	268	2
Democratic	write-in	32	0

=== 2012 special election ===
2012 Council of the District of Columbia, Chair, Special Election
Party	Candidate	Votes	%
Democratic	Phil Mendelson	174,742	71
Democratic	Calvin H. Gurley	69,342	28
Democratic	write-in	3,017	1

=== 2014 primary election ===
2014 Council of the District of Columbia, Chair, Democratic Party Primary Election
Party	Candidate	Votes	%
Democratic	Phil Mendelson	69,138	81
Democratic	Calvin H. Gurley	15,178	18
Democratic	write-in	825	1

=== 2014 general election ===
2014 Council of the District of Columbia, At-Large, General Election
Party	Candidate	Votes	%
Democratic	Anita Bonds	85,575	24
Independent	Elissa Silverman	41,300	12
Independent	Michael D. Brown	28,614	8
Independent	Robert White	22,198	6
Independent	Courtney R. Snowden	19,551	5
DC Statehood Green	Eugene Puryear	12,525	4
Independent	Graylan Scott Hagler	10,539	3
Independent	Khalid Pitts	10,392	3
Republican	Marc Morgan	9,947	3
Independent	Brian Hart	8,933	3
Independent	Kishan Putta	6,135	2
Independent	Calvin Gurley	4,553	1
Independent	Eric J. Jones	4,405	1
Libertarian	Frederick Steiner	3,766	1
Independent	Wendell Felder	2,964	1
	write-in	1,472	0

=== 2016 primary election ===
2016 Council of the District of Columbia, Ward 4, Democratic Party Primary Election
Party	Candidate	Votes	%
Democratic	Brandon Todd	8,145	49
Democratic	Leon T. Andrews Jr.	6,738	41
Democratic	Ron Austin	574	3
Democratic	Calvin H. Gurley	509	3
Democratic	write-in	63	0

=== 2020 general election ===
2020 Council of the District of Columbia At-large General Election
Party	Candidate	Votes	%
Democratic	Robert White	139,208	26%
Independent	Christina D. Henderson	79,189	15%
Independent	Vincent Orange	64,389	12%
Independent	Ed Lazere	61,882	12%
Independent	Marcus Goodwin	60,636	11%
Independent	Markus Batchelor	19,095	4%
Republican	Marya Pickering	17,883	3%
Independent	Mónica Palacio	13,635	3%
DC Statehood Green	Ann C. Wilcox	9,793	2%
Independent	Franklin Garcia	8,972	2%
Independent	Jeanné Lewis	7,417	1%
Independent	Chander Jayaraman	7,365	1%
Independent	Claudia Barragán	5,607	1%
Independent	A'Shia Howard	5,329	1%
Libertarian	Joe Bishop-Henchman	5,173	1%
Independent	Will Merrifield	5,086	1%
Independent	Kathy Henderson	4,803	1%
Independent	Alexander M. "Alex" Padro	3,780	1%
Independent	Calvin H. Gurley	3,203	1%
Independent	Michangelo "DoctorMic" Scruggs	2,874	1%
Independent	Keith Silver	2,605	0%
Independent	Mario Cristaldo	2,384	0%
Independent	Write-in	2,266	0%
Independent	Rick Murphree	1,851	0%
Independent	Eric M. Rogers	1,839	0%
