= Grosso (surname) =

Grosso or Del Grosso is an Italian surname. Notable people with the surname include:

- Carlos Grosso (born 1943), Argentine politician
- Damián Grosso (born 1975), Argentine footballer
- David Grosso (born 1971), American politician from Washington D.C.
- Don Grosso (1915–1985), Canadian ice hockey player
- Fabio Grosso (born 1977), Italian footballer
- Filippo Grosso (born 2006), Italian footballer
- Jeff Grosso (1968–2020), American skateboarder and skateboarding documentarian
- Leonardo Grosso (born 1983), Argentine politician
- Mondo Grosso (born 1967), stage name of Shinichi Osawa, Japanese musician
- Grosso (Portuguese footballer) (born 1986), Portuguese footballer born Pedro Manuel Grosso Pacheco
- Ramón Grosso (1943–2002), Spanish footballer
- Sonny Grosso (1930–2020), American police detective and film/television producer
- Alessandro Del Grosso (born 1972), Italian footballer
- Cristiano Del Grosso (born 1983), Italian footballer
- Federico Del Grosso (born 1983), Italian footballer
- Julia Grosso (born 2000), Canadian soccer player
- Tibor Del Grosso (born 2003), Dutch cyclist

== See also ==
- Delgrosso
- Grosso (disambiguation)
- Mato Grosso
- Concerto grosso
