= Grosso =

Grosso may refer to:

- Grosso, Piedmont, comune in the Metropolitan City of Turin in the Italian region Piedmont
- Grosso (surname), an Italian surname
- Grosso (coin), name for a silver coin used in various states of the Holy Roman Empire

== See also ==
- Grasso
- Grossi
