= Neighbors United =

21st-century American non-profit organization

Neighbors United (NU) is a non-profit organization founded in 2007, by the residents of Capitol Hill East. Neighbors United is an organization focused on providing academic, recreational, and technological programming to youth and adults in low-income communities within Washington, D.C.

In 2007, the Council of the District of Columbia granted Neighbors United $350,000 to implement youth programming. Funding was presented in the form of an earmark (politics), which was backed by politicians Tommy Wells and Kwame R. Brown.

== History ==
Neighbors United was formed when the District of Columbia’s oldest Boys and Girls Club of Greater Washington (BGCGW) announced plans to close its Eastern Branch at 261 17th Street, SE, leaving the youth and elderly in the community without a safe organized recreational outlet. Neighbors United’s mission is to provide support, services, and enriching opportunities for children, youth and adults in the District of Columbia. In the spring of 2010, NU formed a collaborative with Kidney Kare 4 Youth & Adolescents, Inc (KK4YA) a non-profit focused on health and nutrition.

== Programs ==
Neighbors United partners with several local community-based organizations to provide the following services:

- Hip Hop Education in partnership with International Association of Hip Hop Education
- Health and Nutrition Education in partnership with Kidney Kare 4 Youth & Adolescents
- Martial Arts in partnership with Full Circle Martial Arts Academy
- Dance Class in partnership with the Bren-Car School of Dance
- General Education Development (GED) Test Preparation
- NSTEP Study Buddy- Peer-to-Peer Math Tutoring
- Adult Basic Education (ABE)also known as Adult Education

== Partners ==
- Payne Elementary School of District of Columbia Public Schools
- DC Children and Youth Investment Trust Corporation
- District of Columbia Office of the State Superintendent (education) of Education (OSSE) Adult and Family Education Division
