= Grossi =

Grossi is a surname. Notable people with the surname include:

- Alex Grossi (born 1976), American guitarist
- Camillo Grossi (1876–1941), Italian general
- Carlo Grossi (born c. 1634; died 1688), Italian composer and singer
- Cayetano Domingo Grossi (1854–1900), first serial killer in Argentinian history
- Eduardo Vio Grossi (1944–2022), Chilean lawyer and judge
- Elia Grossi (born 1974), Italian former professional tennis player
- Elodie Edwards-Grossi, French sociologist and historian
- Enzo Grossi (1908–1960), Officer in Italian Navy during World War II
- Esther Pillar Grossi (born 1936), Brazilian educator and federal deputy in Rio Grande do Sul
- Fabio Grossi (dancer) (born 1977), Italian dancer and ballet teacher
- Fabio Grossi (athlete) (born 1967), retired Italian sprinter who specialized in the 400 metres
- Franco Grossi (born 1939), Italian discus thrower
- Gabriele Grossi (born 1972), Italian professional football player
- Giordana Grossi, cognitive neuroscientist and psychologist
- Giovanni Francesco Grossi (1653–1697), Italian singer of bel canto
- Guy Grossi (born 1965), Australian Chef and media personality
- Jorge Rodríguez Grossi (born 1947), Chilean politician
- José Nicomedes Grossi (1915–2009), Brazilian bishop
- Lodovico Grossi da Viadana (c. 1560–1627), Italian composer, teacher, and Franciscan friar of the Order of Minor Observants
- Lorenzo Grossi (born 1998), Italian professional footballer
- Marzia Grossi (born 1970), Italian former professional tennis player
- Oreste Grossi (1912–2008), Italian rower
- Orietta Grossi (born 1959), Italian basketball player
- Paolo Grossi (born 1985), Italian professional football player
- Paolo Grossi (judge) (1933–2022), Italian judge
- Patrick Grossi (born 1942), Republican member of the Illinois House of Representatives
- Pietro Grossi (1917–2002), Italian composer of computer music, visual artist and hacker
- Rafael Grossi (born 1961), Argentine diplomat
- Tommaso Grossi (1791–1853), Lombard poet and novelist
- Tony Grossi (born 1958), American radio/TV personality

== Others ==
- plural for Venetian grosso, a silver coin first introduced in Venice in 1193 under doge Enrico Dandolo
