= Delgrosso =

Delgrosso is an Italian surname. Notable people with the surname include:

- Ashly DelGrosso (born 1982), American dancer
- Frank Delgrosso (1899–1981), New Zealand rugby league player
- James Delgrosso (1943–2009), American politician

== See also ==
- Grosso (surname)
