= Patrick Mara =

American politician

Pat Mara
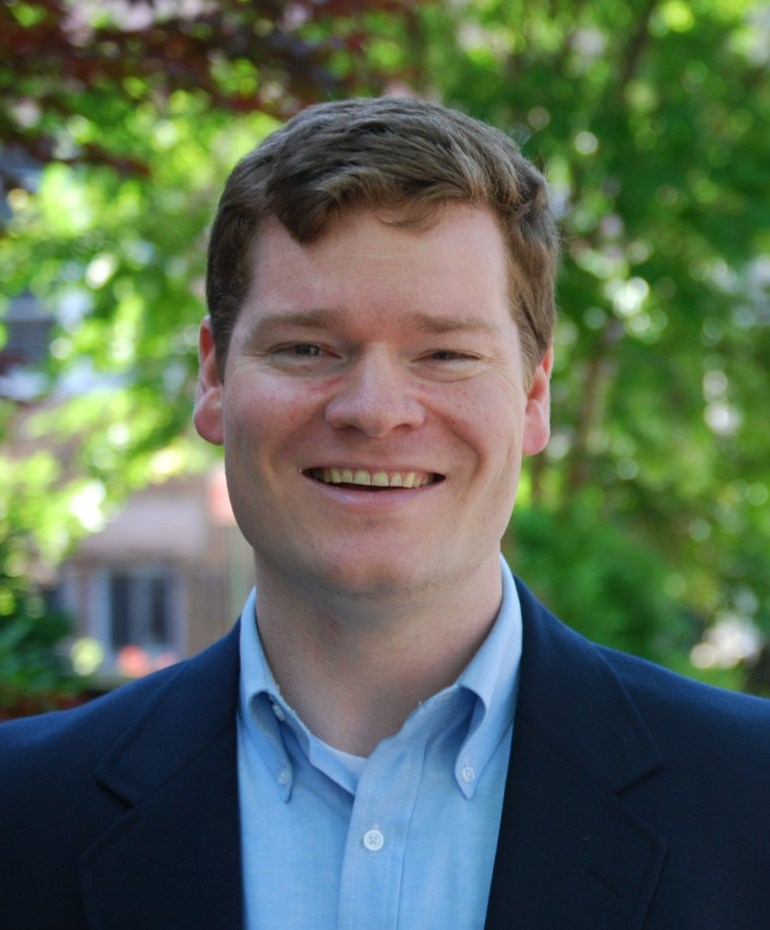

Chair of the District of Columbia Republican Party
- Incumbent
- Assumed office January 14, 2021
- Preceded by: Darlene Glymph

Personal details
- Born: March 1, 1975 (age 51)
- Party: Republican
- Education: Marist College (BS); Babson College (MBA)

Patrick Mara is an American politician, who has served as Chair of the District of Columbia Republican Party since 2021. He previously served as an elected member of the District of Columbia Board of Education from 2010 to 2014.

== Early years ==
Mara is originally from Rhode Island. He earned a Bachelor of Science in political science and environmental science at Marist College. While at Marist, Mara was student body president Mara later served as President of the Marist College Alumni Executive Board and the Alumni Representative to the Marist College Board of Trustees. He graduated with a Master of Business Administration in entrepreneurship from Babson College.

== Political career ==
Mara was a staffer for Senator John H. Chafee, working on environmental issues.

In 2008, Mara defeated incumbent Carol Schwartz in the Republican primary for an at-large seat on the Council of the District of Columbia. The Washington Blade endorsed Mara, noting his support for same-sex marriage and other stands in support of civil rights. The Washington Post endorsed Mara in the Republican primary and in the General Election. Democrat Kwame R. Brown and independent Michael A. Brown won the general election.

In 2010, Mara won the Ward One seat on the District of Columbia State Board of Education with 53 percent of the vote. The Washington Post endorsed Mara in the election.

In 2011, Mara ran in a special election for the at-large seat on the Council of the District of Columbia. The Washington Post endorsed Mara in the 2011 special election for At-Large D.C. Council. Mara came in second behind Vincent Orange.

Mara was a board member at DC Vote from 2011 to 2013.

Mara was a candidate in the special election for the at-large seat on the Council of the District of Columbia in 2013. He was endorsed by The Washington Post. New Jersey Governor Chris Christie robocalled Republicans in the District for Mara. The D.C. chapter of the Sierra Club and the District of Columbia Chamber of Commerce endorsed Mara in the special election. Democratic Councilmember Anita Bonds won the election; Mara lost with 10% of the vote.

In 2014, Mara decided not to run for reelection to the District of Columbia State Board of Education.

In January 2015, Mara was appointed executive director of the District of Columbia Republican Committee.

== Other ventures ==
Mara owns The Dolan Group LLC, a business consulting firm in Washington, D.C.

Mara has served on the board of directors of One World Education and the Columbia Heights Day Initiative.

Mara is a board member of College & Career Connections and previously served on the board of Washington Latin Public Charter School.

== Election results ==
=== 2008 ===
2008 Council of the District of Columbia, At Large, Republican Primary
Party	Candidate	Votes	%
Republican	Patrick Mara	2,370	59
Republican	Carol Schwartz	1,646	41
Republican	Write-in	19	0

2008 Council of the District of Columbia, At Large, General Election
Party	Candidate	Votes	%
Democratic	Kwame R. Brown	172,272	48
Independent	Michael A. Brown	71,720	20
Republican	Patrick Mara	37,447	10
DC Statehood Green	David Schwartzman	18,596	5
Independent	Mark H. Long	14,603	4
Independent	Dee Hunter	7,311	2
	Write-in (including Carol Schwartz)	39,493	11

=== 2010 ===
2010 State Board of Education, Ward One, General Election
Party	Candidate	Votes	%
Nonpartisan	Patrick Mara	6,731	53
Nonpartisan	Dotti Love Wade	5,856	46
Nonpartisan	Write-in	150	1

=== 2011 ===
2011 Council of the District of Columbia, At Large, Special Election
Party	Candidate	Votes	%
Democratic	Vincent Orange	13,583	29
Republican	Patrick Mara	11,851	25
Democratic	Sekou Biddle	9,373	20
Democratic	Bryan Weaver	6,069	13
Democratic	Joshua Lopez	3,343	7
Democratic	Tom Brown	1,036	2
Democratic	Dorothy Douglas	787	2
DC Statehood Green	Alan Page	610	1
Independent	Arkan Haile	137	0
	Write-in	178	0

=== 2013 ===
2013 Council of the District of Columbia, At Large, Special Election
Party	Candidate	Votes	%
Democratic	Anita Bonds	18,027	31
Democratic	Elissa Silverman	15,228	27
Republican	Patrick Mara	13,698	24
Democratic	Matthew Frumin	6,307	11
Democratic	Paul Zuckerberg	1,195	2
Democratic	Michael A. Brown	1,100	2
DC Statehood Green	Perry Redd	1,090	2
	Write-in	187	0

Party political offices
Preceded by Darlene Glymph	Chair of the District of Columbia Republican Party; 2021–present	Incumbent
