= Neil Lewis (journalist) =

American journalist and author

- Born: Neil A. Lewis; United States
- Occupation: Writer, journalist, author
- Genre: Journalism
- Spouse: Mary Cheh

Neil A. Lewis is an American journalist and author. He served as a correspondent at The New York Times for over 20 years. As a journalist, his work has appeared in a variety of magazines, including Rolling Stone, Washington Monthly, The New York Times Book Review, and The New Republic.

In 1995, he co-authored the book Betrayal: The Story of Aldrich Ames, an American Spy, along with Tim Weiner and David Johnston. The book tells the story of Aldrich Ames, a former counterintelligence officer and analyst for the CIA, who was convicted of spying for the Soviet Union and Russia.

== Personal background ==
Lewis is a native New Yorker and a graduate of the Bronx High School for Science. He holds degrees from Union College and Yale Law School. He is married to professor and former Washington DC council member Mary Cheh.

== Professional background ==
In the early 1980s, Lewis worked for the Reuters news agency in London, Washington, D.C., and Johannesburg. He served as Reuters' White House correspondent and their senior correspondent in South Africa.

In 1985, he joined the New York Times, serving as a news correspondent. He covered a variety of topics, including American presidential campaigns, the U.S. Justice Department, and Apartheid-era South Africa. He also covered Supreme Court nominations, as well as issues surrounding the detention of "enemy combatants" at Guantanamo Bay. He retired from his work with the Times in 2009.

After leaving the Times, Lewis began teaching media law at Duke Law School.

He spent spring 2011, serving as a recipient of the Horace W. Goldsmith Fellowship Award at the Joan Shorenstein Center on the Press, Politics and Public Policy at Harvard University's Kennedy School of Government.

As of 2011, Lewis has continued to serve as a contract writer for the New York Times. Beginning in December 2011, he became Executive Director of a non-partisan Task Force on Detainee Treatment under the auspices of The Constitution Project. The Task Force, which includes retired former generals, diplomats, judges, and members of Congress, is planning to produce a report on U.S. treatment of detainees since 9/11.

== Published works ==
Articles

- Recent and archived news articles by Neil A. Lewis of The New York Times, September 25, 2012
- Lewis, Neil. "Fresh Details Emerge on Harsh Methods at Guantanamo", New York Times, January 1, 2005
- Lewis, Neil. "Lighting Up a Few With: Marvin Shanken; To Some Minds, A Cigar is Never Just a Cigar", New York Times, August 9, 2003
- Lewis, Neil. "Red Cross Finds Detainee Abuse in Guantanamo", New York Times, November 30, 2004
- Lewis, Neil. "Sotomayor Vows 'Fidelity to the Law' as Hearings Start", New York Times, July 13, 2009

Books

- Johnston, David; Lewis, Neil A.; and Weiner, Tim. Betrayal: The Story of Aldrich Ames, an American Spy, New York: Random House, 1995, ISBN 978-0-679-44050-5
