= DC Healthy Schools Act =

The DC Healthy Schools Act was passed in May 2010 in order to improve the health of students in the District of Columbia. It was enacted in response to both the obesity epidemic in DC and childhood hunger. It targets all DC Public and Charter Schools. The bill was introduced by Councilwoman Mary M. Cheh, passed unanimously and signed into law by Mayor Adrian Fenty.

== Major goals ==
- Mandating healthier school meals in order to improve nutrition. This involves the introduction of more fruits, vegetables, and whole grains, as well as shifting the types of snacks sold in school stores and vending machines.
- Creating access to school meals for every child, which includes providing a free breakfast to all students, along with the time during school to eat it. This also includes making reduced costs lunches free.
- Increasing Farm to School programs to let students experience healthy food in their meals, as well as learn about locally grown produce.
- Providing more opportunities for physical activity and play to make sure that students develop exercise habits throughout their lives.
- Educating students more directly about health, nutrition, and safety.
- Building greener schools by encouraging recycling, gardening, and energy reduction initiatives. This also involves making sure that the water supply and air the students are using is safe.

== Background ==
=== Childhood obesity ===
This policy has come about due to the increasing concern about obesity in the United States. Twenty years ago, only 3 percent of Americans thought obesity was the most important health problem. Today, that figure is up to 16 percent. The obesity epidemic has become both a personal issue and something that affects the public good. Americans now spend about 127 billion dollars on directly treating obesity related conditions annually. The estimated indirect costs due to missed work, premature death, etc. cost another $150 billion. The fastest rise in obesity is among children, and considering that most children spend a substantial amount of their time at school, it is natural to target schools as a major player in childhood obesity.

=== Federal inaction ===
A major reason for the implementation of the DC healthy schools act is due to a lack of action at the federal level. Due to differences in political philosophy as well as the influence of the food lobby, there have not been any major laws passed that significantly effect change on this issue. Therefore, many local districts have enacted their own acts that are stricter than federal standards.

=== Minority children ===
The obesity epidemic is much more prevalent among underprivileged minorities, with about 16% of white children being overweight, compared to 20% of black children and 19% of Hispanic children. This has been attributed to a variety of factors, including the home environment, advertising, a lack of access to healthy food, and the food served at school. It has been found, for instance, that black and Hispanic girls get much less exercise, on average, than white males. In addition, it has been found that black and Hispanic children spend more time watching TV or playing video games, which also means they are exposed to more ads for unhealthy foods

Unfortunately, this same population is the same that does the worst on standardized test results, and therefore is most targeted by No Child Left Behind. 54% of schools identified for improvement are urban schools, which contain a much higher percentage of black and Hispanic children. A common response to this has been to “narrow the curriculum”, which means that many subjects, such as physical education, become superfluous, replaced by extra classes for mathematics and English. 70% of schools have reported cutting at least one class in favor of additional tested material. Another telling statistic is that in 1991 42% of students had physical education daily, compared to 28% of students in 2003. In addition to combating obesity or poor nutrition, the other impetus for this act is that there has been research that links physical activity and cognitive functioning. Specifically, aerobic fitness was found to have a positive correlation with attention and working memory. In another study, it was found that there were major differences in test scores for reading and math when overweight children were compared to non-overweight children. A third study found that being overweight had a significantly negative impact on academics and socio-behavioral outcomes among girls, though not boys.

== Major changes ==
There have been two major rounds of changes since the bill was signed into law. The first changes were made by the Fiscal Year 2012 Budget Support of Act of 2011. These changes most affected the reduced prices for breakfast and lunches for children. Specifically, the provision to provide free breakfast in charter schools was cancelled, as well as subsidizing breakfast in general. The other major change is that over $4 million collected from vendors will be deposited into the Healthy Schools Act Fund. The second changes came about due to the Healthy Schools Amendment Act of 2011, which was signed by Mayor Vincent Gray. The first major change in this amendment allowed private schools can choose to participate in the Healthy Schools Act. The other major change was to have schools submit additional information to the Office of the State Superintendent of Education, such as the number of students who qualify for free and reduced meals, the number of students who participate in free and reduced meals, and more general things like the number of vending machines, school stores, and which schools participates in the Fresh Fruit and Vegetable Snack Program.
