= Damián Grosso =

Argentine footballer

Personal information
- Full name: Damián Grosso Prijmak
- Date of birth: February 6, 1975 (age 51)
- Place of birth: Castelar, Argentina
- Height: 1.83 m (6 ft 0 in)
- Position: Goalkeeper

Senior career*
Years	Team	Apps	(Gls)
1996–1997	Ferro Carril Oeste	0	(0)
1997–2001	Almagro	70	(0)
2001–2002	Atlante F.C.	38	(0)
2003–2004	CD Veracruz	56	(0)
2004–2006	Instituto de Córdoba	11	(0)
2006–2007	Quilmes	25	(0)
2007–2008	Talleres de Córdoba	6	(0)
2008–2009	Ferro Carril Oeste	8	(0)
2009	The Strongest	18	(0)
2009–2012	Ferro Carril Oeste		
- * Club domestic league appearances and goals

Damián Grosso Prijmak (born 6 February 1975 in Castelar) is a former Argentine football goalkeeper.

Grosso made his professional debut in 1996 for Ferro Carril Oeste. He joined Almagro in 1997, helping them gain promotion to the Argentine Primera in 2000, after the club were relegated in 2001 he moved to Mexico where he played for Atlante F.C. and CD Veracruz before returning to Argentina in 2004. He played for Instituto de Córdoba, Quilmes, Talleres de Córdoba and recently in a second spell with Ferro Carril Oeste.

In January 2009, he signed for La Paz based club The Strongest.
