= Sekou Biddle =

American politician

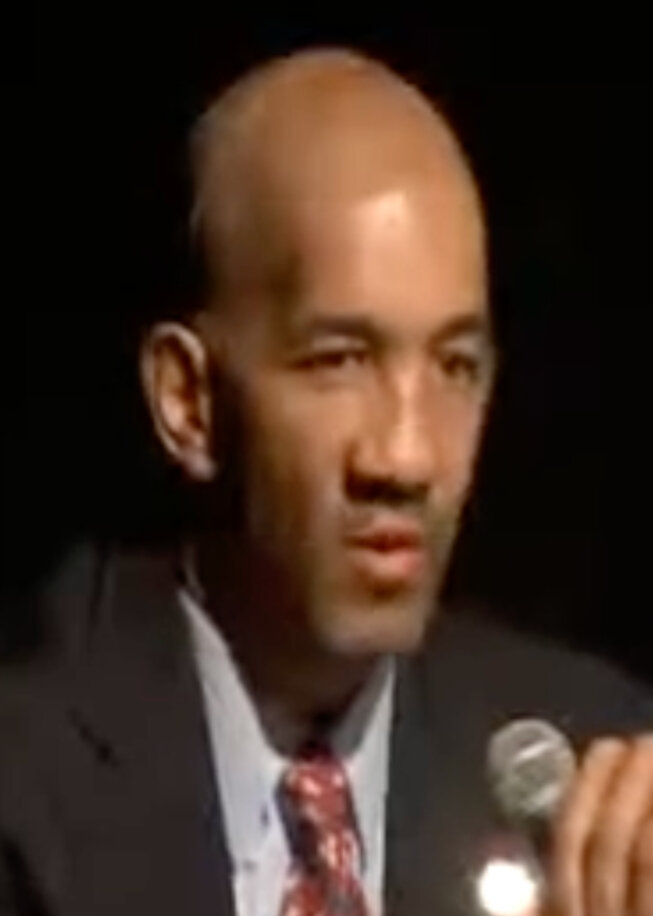

Member of the Council of the District of Columbia from the at-large district
- In office January 6, 2011 – May 10, 2011
- Preceded by: Kwame R. Brown
- Succeeded by: Vincent Orange

Personal details
- Born: May 3, 1971 (age 55) Washington, D.C., U.S.
- Party: Democratic
- Education: Morehouse College (BA)

Sekou Biddle (born May 3, 1971) is a politician in Washington, D.C.

== Early years and education ==
Biddle was born raised in Columbia Heights in Washington, D.C., and graduated from Woodrow Wilson High School, where he played football. Biddle graduated from Morehouse College with a degree in business administration.

== Professional career ==
Following graduation, he taught at an elementary school in the Bronx borough of New York City, through Teach for America. He later taught at an elementary school in Atlanta, became a math teacher at the Knowledge Is Power Program KEY Academy in the District in 2005, and then became director of community outreach for the Knowledge Is Power Program.

== Political career ==
Biddle was one of eight candidates in a 2007 special election to represent District 2 (wards 3 and 4) in the District of Columbia State Board of Education. Biddle's candidacy focused on his upbringing and educational work in the District. Biddle's candidacy was endorsed by The Washington Post's editorial board and the District's Gertrude Stein Democratic Club. Biddle won the election with 30% of the vote.

In 2008, the composition of the District of Columbia State Board of Education was changed from five mayoral-appointed members and four elected members to only nine elected members, one from each ward and one at-large member. Biddle ran uncontested to represent Ward 4. His candidacy was endorsed by The Washington Post's editorial board. Biddle also became executive director of Jumpstart for Young Children, a nonprofit organization that prepares children for elementary school.

Following Kwame Brown's swearing in as chair of the Council of the District of Columbia in 2011, the District of Columbia Democratic State Committee announced an election by its members to replace Brown as at-large member of the Council. Biddle, former Council member Vincent Orange, and six others filed. Brown endorsed Biddle for the position, as did Council members Harry Thomas Jr., Mary Cheh, Muriel Bowser, Yvette Alexander, and Marion Barry. District mayor Vincent Gray said he supported Brown's endorsement of Biddle. On January 6, 2011, Biddle was chosen by the Committee as at-large member of the Council.

Biddle announced that he would run for the position in a special election to be held on April 26, 2011. Other candidates in the race include former Council member Vincent Orange, District Board of Education member Patrick Mara, and community activist Bryan Weaver. Mayor Vincent Gray endorsed Biddle's candidacy. Biddle placed third in the special election, losing to former Council member Vincent Orange. Biddle's temporary appointment expired on May 10, 2011, when Vincent Orange was sworn into office.

== Personal life ==
Biddle lives in Shepherd Park with his wife and children.
