= Patrick Grossi =

American politician

Hon. Patrick Grossi
- Born: October 31, 1942 (age 83); Chicago Heights, Illinois
- Political party: Republican

Member of the Illinois House of Representatives from the 10th district
- In office 1979–1983

Associate Judge for the Circuit Court of Cook County
- In office 1984–1986

Judge for the Circuit Court of Cook County
- In office 1986–2001
- Preceded by: Richard Petrarca

Judge for the 6th Municipal District of the Circuit Court of Cook County
- In office 2001 – July 2003
- Preceded by: Sheila Murphy

Patrick S. Grossi (born October 31, 1942) was a Republican member of the Illinois House of Representatives from 1979 to 1983.

== Biographical sketch ==
Grossi was born October 31, 1942, in Chicago Heights, Illinois. He earned a Bachelor of Arts in history from Northern Illinois University and a juris doctor from Chicago-Kent College of Law. Grossi was admitted to the bar in 1972. He served as the city attorney for Chicago Heights until his election to the Illinois House. At one point in time, Grossi was a member of the United States Army.

In the 1978 general election, Grossi was elected to the Illinois House of Representatives alongside Robert J. Piel and L. Michael Getty. Grossi and Piel, the Republican ticket, defeated Democratic incumbent John Matejek. He resided in Glenwood at the time of his legislative service.

Grossi joined the bench as an associate judge for the Circuit Court of Cook County in 1984. He was elected a circuit judge in 1986. After the retirement of Sheila Murphy, Grossi was appointed the interim presiding judge of Cook County Circuit Court's Sixth Municipal District in Markham, Illinois. Grossi retired from the bench on July 8, 2003.
