= Grasso =

Grasso is an Italian surname. Notable people with the surname include:

- Alexa Grasso (born 1993), Mexican mixed martial artist
- Dick Edgar Ibarra Grasso (1914–2000), Argentine researcher
- Domenico Grasso (born 1955), American engineer and educator
- Ella Grasso (1919–1981), American politician
- Francis Grasso (1949–2001), American disc jockey
- Mateo Grasso (born 1995), Argentine footballer
- Pietro Grasso (born 1945), Italian politician
- Richard Grasso (born 1946), chairman and chief executive of the New York Stock Exchange
- Thomas J. Grasso (1962–1995), American murderer executed by lethal injection

== Place ==
- Mistralian norm for Grasse
