= David Grosso =

American politician (born 1970)

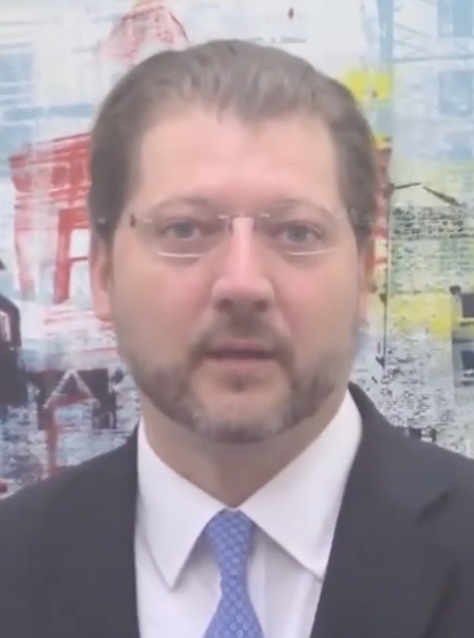

Member of the Council of the District of Columbia from the at-large district
- In office January 2, 2013 – January 2, 2021
- Preceded by: Michael Brown
- Succeeded by: Christina Henderson

Personal details
- Born: September 18, 1970 (age 55) Washington, D.C., U.S.
- Party: Independent
- Spouse: Serra Sippel
- Education: Earlham College (BA); Georgetown University (JD)

David Grosso (born September 18, 1970) is an American attorney and politician. He is a former at-large member of the Council of the District of Columbia who lives in Brookland. A native Washingtonian, he graduated from Earlham College and Georgetown University Law Center. Grosso is a member of the D.C. Bar. Following the completion of his second term on the D.C. Council, he joined the law firm Arent Fox as a lobbyist.

== Early life ==
Grosso was born in Washington, D.C. During his childhood, he lived on a farm in Northern Virginia. As a teenager, he lived on Rock Creek Church Road in Petworth.

Grosso graduated from Earlham College with a degree in philosophy. He received a J.D. from Georgetown University Law Center in 2001. Before attending college, Grosso volunteered helping refugees from El Salvador living in Honduras. He also spent a year as a full-time volunteer building a transitional housing program for homeless women in San Antonio, Texas, where he met his wife, Serra Sippel, also a native Washingtonian and president of the Center for Health and Gender Equity.

Grosso worked for D.C. Councilmember Sharon Ambrose working as a clerk for the District's Economic Development Committee. He worked as Chief Counsel to Congresswoman Eleanor Holmes Norton and was a vice president of public policy for health insurance carrier CareFirst for several years.

== Council of the District of Columbia ==
=== 2012 campaign ===
In 2012, Grosso and six other individuals declared their candidacy for two seats as at-large member of the Council of the District of Columbia. Grosso ran as an independent candidate. In accordance with the District's Home Rule Act, one of the seats up for election that year was reserved for an individual who is not affiliated with the Democratic Party.

During a debate among the four candidates for the at-large council seat, Grosso supported expanding the types of illnesses that qualify for medical marijuana. Grosso said he supported the five-cent tax on disposable bags, and he said he does not support school vouchers. Grosso also said he would vote to censure Councilmember Jim Graham for violations of Metro's code of ethics. In addition, Grosso said he was in favor of speeding cameras, saying that they were important because they slow drivers and save lives. Grosso supports giving tax incentives for private employers to move to the District.

The Washington Post editorial board endorsed Grosso for at-large councilmember, citing Grosso's experience with the economic development committee and knowledge of city government. Council member Tommy Wells and former Council member William Lightfoot endorsed Grosso's candidacy. Grosso also earned the endorsements of the Current Newspapers, the D.C. chapter of the Sierra Club, and Greater Greater Washington.

Grosso won one of two at-large seats on the council with twenty percent of the vote.

=== Council Period 20 (2013–2014) ===
Grosso was sworn into office as an at-Large Member of the Council of the District of Columbia on January 2, 2013. During Council Period 20 (his first two years in office), Grosso served on the following committees: Business, Consumer and Regulatory Affairs; Education; Finance and Revenue; Health; and Transportation and the Environment. During this council period, Grosso was the original author of 33 bills and resolutions—19 of which were approved by the D.C. Council.

Grosso named education reform as a top priority. In 2013, as a member of the council's Committee on Education, Grosso sponsored a measure on school suspensions and expulsions that was added to the Attendance Accountability Amendment Act of 2013. The provision required the Office of the State Superintendent of Education to develop an annual report with findings and recommendations for schools to reduce or eliminate the use of out of school suspensions and expulsions, except for extreme cases. Grosso also supported the Committee on Education in reinstituting the Office of the Ombudsman within the State Board of Education, investments in public libraries for extended hours, professional development, library renovations, enhancements to the community schools grant program, requirement for DCPS to report on their restorative justice pilot program, expansion of the school based mental health program, and funding for teen health educators who provide sexual and reproductive health education to their peers.

In April 2013, Grosso voted against the Telemedicine Reimbursement Act, a bill to require health insurers in the city to pay for health care services provided remotely via interactive audio and video (telemedicine), an increasingly common method of health care delivery. Fellow Councilmember Mary Cheh criticized Grosso's vote, characterizing it as a favor to health insurance companies.

On his first year on the council, Grosso introduced the Expedited Partner Therapy Act of 2013 in an effort to reduce the spread of sexually transmitted infections. It allows health care providers to provide treatment for the partner of a patient that has been diagnosed with a sexually transmitted infection without an examination of the partner at a health care facility. The bill was passed by the council and became law in May 2014.

Grosso also introduced a nonbinding resolution calling upon the Washington Redskins NFL team to change its name, stating that the current name is "racist and derogatory" (see Washington Redskins name controversy). The Council approved the resolution unanimously. Grosso suggested that the team adopt the name "Redtails" in honor of the Tuskegee Airmen.

In 2013, Grosso introduced the Marijuana Legalization and Regulation Act as a result of reports produced by the Washington Lawyers’ Committee and the American Civil Liberties Union indicating that 91% of all marijuana arrests in D.C. were of African Americans, although research shows that the use of marijuana is roughly equal between both African Americans and Whites. Although no members joined Grosso to co-sponsor this bill, eventually the Council passed a law to decriminalize possession of marijuana, and the residents of D.C. voted overwhelmingly to legalize possessing and growing the plant. Although Grosso reintroduced the bill in 2015, a Congressional rider on the D.C. budget was interpreted to prohibit the holding of a hearing on the legislation—this time co-introduced by three other members, and three Committees were prepared to act on the bill, showing the progress made on the issue.

A companion bill to the Marijuana Legalization and Regulation Act was the Record Sealing for Non-Violent Marijuana Possession Act of 2013, a bill to seal the arrest and conviction records for non-violent marijuana charges. Grosso's intent for this legislation was to reduce barriers to employment, housing, and higher education. The Council passed the bill and it became law in March 2015.

Finally, the Anti-Shackling of Incarcerated Pregnant Women Act of 2013 prohibits the shackling of incarcerated women in D.C. adult and youth detention facilities. The bill also applies to women in post-partum recovery. The Council passed this bill and it is set to become law in July 2015. As a result of his work on this bill, Councilmember Grosso sought to stop the practice of shackling youth during their appearances in juvenile court.

Grosso proposed amendments to the District of Columbia Human Rights Act of 1977 to ensure that individuals are protected from discrimination by an employer or employment based on an individual's or dependent's reproductive health decision making. The Council approved the legislation in December 2014 with support from the Executive and it passed into law in May 2015. Grosso also successfully sought the repeal of Prostitution Free Zones Amendment Act of 2014, which repealed the law allowing the Metropolitan Police Department of the District of Columbia to declare a specific location as a "prostitution-free zone" for 20 days. Grosso argued that the designation of zones were fueled by bias.

Grosso also introduced the D.C. Urban Farming and Food Security Act of 2014 to establish an urban farming land leasing initiative and a real property tax abatement for small-scale urban farming. The bill was approved by the Council in December 2014 and became law in April 2015.

Grosso also introduced the Fair Leave Act of 2014, to provide D.C. government employees up to six weeks of paid leave in connection with the birth, adoption, or fostering of a child, or the care of a family member who has a serious medical condition. On October 1, 2014, the eight weeks of paid family leave policy went into effect for all D.C. Government employees.

In 2014, Grosso introduced an elections reform package consisting of instant-runoff voting (IRV, also called ranked-choice voting), open primaries, and a "clean hands" provision. Under IRV, voters rank candidates in order of preference. The candidate with the fewest votes is then eliminated, with those votes being re-apportioned to the remaining candidates. In support of the bill, Grosso said that IRV would result in higher voter turnout, promote positive and more widespread campaigning, and ensure that the elected candidate has true majority support. The Instant Runoff Voting Amendment Act was endorsed by the Washington Post editorial board. The Open Primary Elections Amendment Act of 2014 would allow registered voters to change their party affiliation up until Election Day in order to vote in a primary. Lastly, the Clean Hands Elections Reform Amendment Act of 2014 requires all candidates for elected office to obtain a “clean hands” certification, confirming that neither the candidate nor any of the candidate's previous campaigns or political committees owes any outstanding taxes, fines or fees to the District. This legislation had a hearing in September 2014. Grosso also introduced the Local Resident Voting Rights Act, a bill to grant voting rights for municipal elections to legal permanent non-citizen D.C. residents. Grosso's proposal to implement public financing of elections campaigns, Public Financing of Political Campaigns Amendment Act of 2013, was discussed along with a number of other elections reform bills during hearings in March 2013, but was not moved out of Committee. Grosso also supports public financing of D.C. elections.

In 2014, Grosso formed Arts Action DC, a coalition of D.C. residents in the creative economy sector, in an effort to advocate for funding, support, and growth of the arts.

=== Council Period 21 (2015–2016) ===
Grosso was appointed Chairperson of the Committee on Education for the Council Period 21. Grosso is the second chair to have jurisdiction over education after the Committee became stand-alone (outside of the Committee of the Whole). His bill to prohibit suspensions and expulsions for pre-kindergarten students in D.C. Public Schools and the public charter schools was the first permanent legislation passed by the new Council. Grosso said that his education priorities were age-appropriate school discipline, attendance and truancy, mental health services, improving literacy, ending the school to prison pipeline, promoting quality early childhood education, and expanding community and family engagement.

During the Fiscal Year 2016 Budget vote, the Committee on Education approved a $2.4 billion budget that supported modernization of the Martin Luther King Jr. Memorial Library (the central library of the District of Columbia Public Library), and created a new, objective approach to determining capital funding for D.C. Public Schools. The budget allocated $1.6 million for a new literacy intervention program, targeted at 3rd grade reading and writing success, and restored $760,000 in funding to the University of the District of Columbia. The budget allocated almost $700,000 to DCPS to make up for funding losses at schools such as Wilson and Ballou High Schools, and $450,000 to restore funding for SAT and ACT test preparation courses for D.C. high school students. The Budget Support Act broadened the scope of the Bullying Prevention Taskforce and extended its term until August 2018.

=== Council Period 22 (2017–2018) ===
Grosso was sworn into office for the new four-year council term at noon on January 2, 2017. Following the departure of school chancellor Antwan Wilson, Grosso announced that he would investigate the controversial preferential student placement that lead to his resignation. Grosso said he was willing to require Mayor Bowser to testify under oath about the practice and whether she was aware it was taking place. Three days later, following a visit from counsel to Mayor Bowser, Mark Tuohey, Grosso changed his mind and said that he would not hold a hearing, stating that the committee's efforts were better focused elsewhere.

In October 2018, Grosso voted to repeal Initiative 77, a referendum passed by the majority of DC voters months earlier that would phase out a tipped minimum wage. Initially, Grosso declined to say how he would vote before supporting the repeal. A report by Public Citizen revealed that Grosso had accepted more than $10,000 in payments from restaurant-related interests opposed to Initiative 77.

In July 2019, Grosso was the first member of the DC Council to call for Jack Evans' resignation following revelations about his outside employment. In November 2019 he announced that he would not run for reelection, citing a need to live out his belief that Councilmembers should not serve more than two terms and that he wanted to encourage a new generation of progressive activists.

== Personal life ==
David and Serra live in the Brookland neighborhood of Ward 5 with their dogs Frida and Diego. He is a registered medical marijuana patient.

Following the arrest of New Jersey priest Scott Asalone on charges of sexually abusing a teenager in Loudoun County, Virginia in 1985, Grosso publicly came forward as the one who was sexually abused by Asalone and issued a statement claiming that "The minor he assaulted was me.”

== Election results ==
Official results from the District of Columbia Board of Elections:

| Name | Party | Votes | Percentage |
|---|---|---|---|
| Vincent Orange (incumbent) | Democratic | 144,595 | 38% |
| David Grosso | Independent | 78,123 | 20% |
| Michael A. Brown (incumbent) | Independent | 57,762 | 15% |
| Mary Brooks Beatty | Republican | 27,847 | 7% |
| A.J. Cooper | Independent | 25,012 | 6% |
| Leon J. Swain Jr. | Independent | 24,588 | 6% |
| Ann C. Wilcox | Statehood-Green | 22,802 | 6% |
| Write-In | | 2,402 | 1% |
