= Esther Pillar Grossi =

Brazilian politician

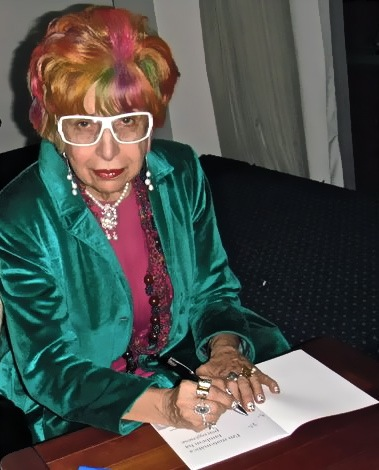

Federal deputy
- In office 1985–2002

Personal details
- Born: April 24, 1936 Santa Maria, Rio Grande do Sul, Brazil
- Party: Workers' Party
- Occupation: Teacher; Stateswoman

Esther Pillar Grossi (Santa Maria, April 24, 1936) is a Brazilian educator. She was federal deputy for the PT in Rio Grande do Sul from 1995 to 2002 and has worked primarily in education. In 1955, she went to Porto Alegre, where she studied mathematics, field where later a master's degree at the Sorbonne in Paris.

== See also ==
- Central Única dos Trabalhadores
- UNESCO
