= Grosso (Portuguese footballer) =

Portuguese footballer

Personal information
- Full name: Pedro Manuel Grosso Pacheco
- Date of birth: 11 June 1986 (age 40)
- Place of birth: Santo Tirso, Portugal
- Height: 1.80 m (5 ft 11 in)
- Position: Midfielder

Youth career
- 1995–2004: Desportivo Aves
- 2004–2005: Académica de Coimbra

Senior career*
Years	Team	Apps	(Gls)
2005−2015	Aves	144	(2)
2006−2007	→ Leça (loan)	1	(0)
- * Club domestic league appearances and goals

Pedro Manuel Grosso Pacheco (born 11 June 1986), known as Grosso, is a retired Portuguese footballer who played as a midfielder.

== Career ==
Born in Santo Tirso, Grosso is a youth prospect of C.D. Aves, arriving as a 9-year-old, and representing them until 2004, when he moved to Académica de Coimbra to finish his youth development.

He wasn't given a contract at Académica, so he returned to Desportivo de Aves, debuting on 7 May 2006, in an away draw against Estoril-Praia, for the 2005–06 Liga de Honra.

In 2006, he was loaned to Leça in the fourth tier, but only made one appearance, returning to Aves in the following season, to become a regular starter.
