= Michael A. Brown (American politician) =

American politician

Michael Brown
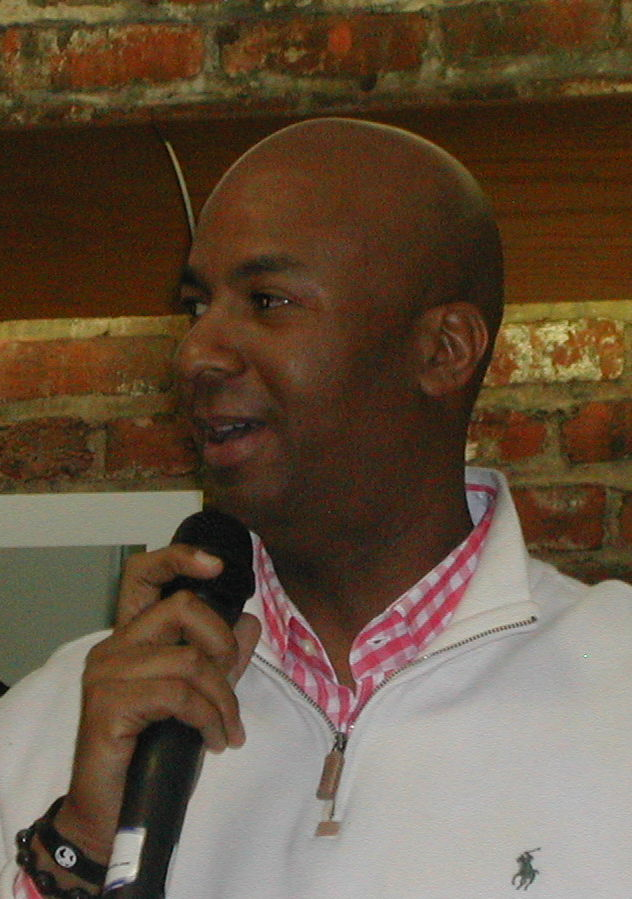
- Brown at DC Candidates Forum, March 13, 2013

Chair pro tempore of the Council of the District of Columbia
- In office June 13, 2012 – January 2, 2013
- Preceded by: Mary Cheh
- Succeeded by: Kenyan McDuffie

Member of the Council of the District of Columbia from the at-large district
- In office January 2, 2009 – January 2, 2013
- Preceded by: Carol Schwartz
- Succeeded by: David Grosso

Personal details
- Born: Michael Arrington Brown; March 4, 1965 (age 61) Kassel, West Germany (now Germany)
- Party: Democratic (before 2008); Independent (2008–present)
- Spouse: Tamara Smith-Barnes (divorced)
- Children: 2
- Relatives: Ron Brown (father)
- Education: Clark University (BA); Widener University, Delaware (JD)

Michael Arrington Brown (born March 4, 1965) is an American politician in Washington, D.C. In 2008, he was elected an at-large member of the Council of the District of Columbia and served one four-year term.

Brown lived in Chevy Chase. He served a prison sentence for bribery from 2014 to 2016. His father was Ron Brown, a former United States Secretary of Commerce.

== Early life ==
Brown was born in Kassel, West Germany, while his father was stationed there for the Army. He moved to the District of Columbia at age six. He graduated from Mackin Catholic High School in Washington, then received a Bachelor of Science degree from Clark University in 1987. He received a Juris Doctor degree from Widener University School of Law in 1991, but he did not pass the bar.

In 1993, he served as political director of America's Fund, a fund-raising network for political candidates of color.

In 1997, Brown pleaded guilty to the misdemeanor of contributing to the 1994 reelection campaign of Sen. Edward M. Kennedy that exceeded the $2,000 limit. He was required to perform 150 hours of community service and pay $7,818 to cover the cost of supervised probation.

Brown considered running for mayor of the District of Columbia in 1998, but he ultimately decided against it, saying his mother was adamantly against it. At the time, he was a lobbyist for Patton Boggs and president and chief executive of the Ronald H. Brown Foundation.

From 1996 to 2005, Brown was vice chairman of the District of Columbia Boxing and Wrestling Commission. His efforts to bring a Mike Tyson-Lennox Lewis boxing match to the District were ultimately unsuccessful.

In 2005, Brown's wages were garnished by a court for defaulting on payments on a lease of an MCI Center suite. At the time, Brown was a managing partner for the lobbying firm of Alcalde & Fay.

== 2006 mayoral candidacy ==
In September 2005, Brown announced the beginning of his campaign for mayor of the District of Columbia. Brown polled at 3 percent in August 2006 and was considered a long shot at best to become mayor in the election held that year. In an interview, his sister remembered that, at age 9, Brown had expressed his dream to be mayor someday.

After consistently trailing the pack of mayoral candidates, Brown dropped out of the race on September 7 and announced his support for another candidate, council chair Linda W. Cropp, saying, "I cannot watch a political novice, a man without the courage and strength required to run the city, attempt to steal this race from someone who has seen the city through its worse times." Federal prosecutors later said that Jeff Thompson paid Brown $350,000 to drop out of the race and endorse Cropp.

Cropp lost to Adrian Fenty 57 to 31 percent in the Democratic primary five days later.

== 2007 council candidacy ==
Brown ran to represent Ward 4 on the Council of the District of Columbia. The seat was vacated by Adrian Fenty when he became mayor. Brown lost the May 1 special election in a field of 19 candidates to Muriel Bowser after she received the mayor's endorsement, receiving 27 percent of the vote to Bowser's 40.

Brown later admitted that he accepted a $20,000 illegal donation from Jeff Thompson during this campaign.

=== Results ===
As certified by the D.C. Board of Elections and Ethics:

Name	Party	Votes	Percentage
Muriel Bowser	Democratic	5,064	40%
Michael A. Brown	Democratic	3,433	27%
Charles Gaither	Democratic	683	5%
Dwight E. Singleton	Democratic	602	5%
Renee Bowser	Statehood-Green	583	5%
Graylan Scott Hagler	Democratic	468	4%
others		1,734	14%

== 2008 council candidacy ==
In 2008, Brown ran for a at-large council member seat.

Unlike Brown's previous candidacies when he ran as a Democrat, Brown ran as an independent candidate. District law allows only three of the five at-large Council seats, including the chair, to be affiliated with the same political party. Chair Vincent Gray and Phil Mendelson, both Democrats, were not up for reelection in 2008, so only one of the seats up for reelection could be won by a Democrat. Democratic incumbent Kwame R. Brown was running for reelection and was likely to win, which made it nearly assured that the other seat up for election would go to a non-Democrat.

Brown later admitted to accepting an illegal $125,000 donation from Jeff Thompson during this campaign.

=== Results ===
As certified by the D.C. Board of Elections and Ethics:

Name	Party	Votes	Percentage
Kwame R. Brown	Democratic	172,272	48%
Michael A. Brown	Independent	71,720	20%
Write In	(including Carol Schwartz)	39,493	11%
Patrick Mara	Republican	37,447	10%
David Schwartzman	Statehood-Green	18,596	5%
Mark H. Long	Independent	14,603	4%
Dee Hunter	Independent	7,311	2%

== 2012 council candidacy ==
In 2012, Brown ran for reelection as an at-large council member.

During the campaign, The Washington Post reported that Brown had received five foreclosure notices on his house in Chevy Chase, Maryland between 1996 and 2010. It was also reported that Brown was delinquent in paying property taxes on his house in January 2011. In April 2011, the Internal Revenue Service filed a lien against Brown for nonpayment of over $50,000 of income taxes between 2004 and 2008.

In July 2012, Brown announced that there had been large unauthorized expenditures. Brown fired his campaign's treasurer, who was indicted for the crime in March 2014. Two months later, Brown said that over $110,000 was missing from his campaign's bank account, and he apologized to his supporters and contributors. An audit by the Office of Campaign Finance found $126,000 of unreported expenditures and $8,446 in unreported contributions. Between 2005 and 2010, Brown's driver's license had been suspended several times due to unpaid traffic citations and moving violations.

Independent candidate David Grosso defeated Brown. Grosso received more votes than Brown in wards 1, 2, 3, 4, and 6, while Brown received more votes than Grosso in wards 5, 7, and 8.

=== Results ===
Unofficial results from The Washington Post:

Name	Party	Votes	Percentage
Vincent Orange	Democratic	122,762	38%
David Grosso	Independent	68,362	21%
Michael A. Brown	Independent	50,335	15%
Mary Brooks Beatty	Republican	23,160	7%
A.J. Cooper	Independent	21,535	7%
Leon J. Swain Jr.	Independent	21,535	7%
Ann C. Wilcox	Statehood-Green	18,985	6%

== 2013 council candidacy ==
Brown was one of seven candidates running for an at-large seat on the council in a special election held on April 23, 2013. He dropped out of the campaign on April 2, too late to remove his name from the ballot. Brown received two percent of the vote; Anita Bonds won the election with 31 percent of the vote.

== Federal prosecution and conviction ==
On June 7, 2013, federal prosecutors charged Brown with bribery. Between July 2012 and February 2013, then-Councilmember Brown allegedly sought and accepted $55,000 in cash from representatives of a business to help the business receive contracts and preferential government certification. The representatives were undercover employees of the Federal Bureau of Investigation. Brown described it as a "loan arrangement", not a bribe. The charge was issued with a document that usually indicates that there has been a plea deal. Federal prosecutors sought a $35,000 judgment against Brown.

In February 2014, federal prosecutors said that Jeffrey E. Thompson illegally paid $100,000 of Brown's campaign bills, to which Brown admitted. Brown also admitted to accepting a $20,000 illegal donation from Thompson during his 2007 campaign and an illegal $125,000 donation from Thompson during his 2008 campaign. Brown was also accused of accepting a bribe from Thompson to drop out of the 2006 election for mayor.

Brown pleaded guilty to the charge of accepting a bribe from the undercover agents. As part of the plea deal, he did not face charges on accepting bribes and illegal contributions in 2006, 2007, and 2008, allowing him to avoid the minimum 15-year sentence he could have received had he been convicted by a jury.

Prosecutors asked Brown to be sentenced to 43 months in prison at his May 8, 2014 sentencing hearing. Brown's defense attorneys requested that Brown be sentenced to less than 37 months, less than the minimum sentence under federal guidelines.

On May 29, 2014, Brown was sentenced to 39 months in prison, two years of supervised release, and 200 hours of community service. Brown's attorney said that Brown would not run for public office again. However, in 2024, Brown ran for the position of Delegate to the House of Representatives, as an independent, running against the incumbent, Delegate Eleanor Holmes Norton.

=== Incarceration ===
Brown was incarcerated at Federal Prison Camp, Montgomery, a minimum security prison in Alabama. Brown was originally scheduled to be released in May 2017, but he was released from prison to a halfway house in Baltimore in 2016. In February 2017, Brown moved to home confinement at the home of his fiancée, Jessica Herrera-Nunez.

== Committees ==
- Special Committee on Statehood and Self-Determination – Chairperson
- Finance and Revenue
- Housing and Workforce Development – Chairperson
- Aging and Community Affairs
- Human Services
- Public Services and Consumer Affairs

Council of the District of Columbia
Preceded by Mary Cheh	Chair pro tempore of the Council of the District of Columbia; 2012–2013	Succeeded by Kenyan McDuffie
