= Vincent Orange =

American politician (born 1957)

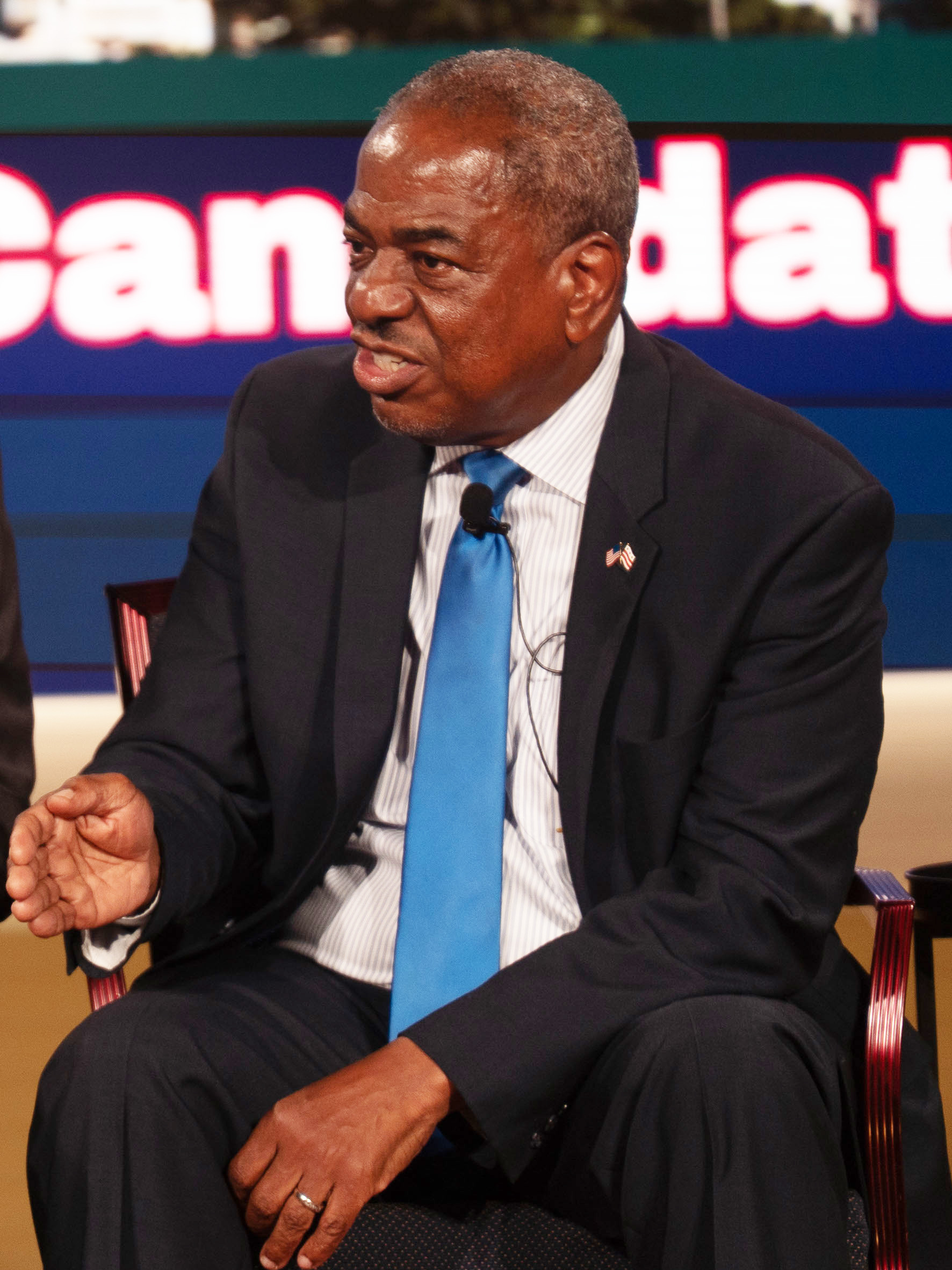

Member of the Council of the District of Columbia from the at-large district
- In office May 10, 2011 – August 15, 2016
- Preceded by: Sekou Biddle
- Succeeded by: Robert White

Member of the Council of the District of Columbia from Ward 5
- In office January 2, 1999 – January 2, 2007
- Preceded by: Harry Thomas Sr.
- Succeeded by: Harry Thomas Jr.

Personal details
- Born: Vincent Bernard Orange Sr. April 11, 1957 (age 69) Oakland, California, U.S.
- Party: Democratic
- Education: University of the Pacific (BA); Howard University (JD); Georgetown University (LLM)

Vincent Bernard Orange Sr. (born April 11, 1957) is an American former politician from Washington, D.C.. A lawyer and a certified public accountant, Orange represented Ward 5 on the Council of the District of Columbia from 1999 to 2007, and was an at-large member from 2011 to 2016. He lost the June 2016 Democratic primary election to Robert White. Although his term was not due to end until January 2, 2017, Orange resigned from the council on August 15, 2016, after he became president of the D.C. Chamber of Commerce.

== Early years ==
Vincent Bernard Orange was born April 11, 1957, and raised in Oakland, California. With a scholarship Orange attended Fountain Valley School of Colorado in Colorado Springs, Colorado. He graduated from the University of the Pacific, where he earned a Bachelor of Science in Business Administration in 1979 and a Bachelor of Arts in Communications in 1980. In 1983, he earned a Juris Doctor from Howard University School of Law. He worked as a senior tax accountant for accounting firm Arthur Andersen from 1983 to 1987. In 1988, he graduated from the Georgetown University Law Center, where he earned a Master of Laws in Taxation. Orange is a member of Alpha Phi Alpha fraternity.

In 1981, Orange worked weekends as a security guard at the Washington Post, a position he kept for fourteen years. From 1987 to 1989, Orange worked for the district's department of finance and revenue. He was manager of the district's Tax Amnesty Program, and he was acting chief of the District's Office of Real Property Tax Assessment Services Division. In 1988, he served as a United States delegate to the United States/Japan Bilateral Session: "A New Era in Legal and Economic Relations" in Tokyo, Japan. In September 1990, he served as a delegate to the Moscow Conference on Law and Bilateral Economic Relations.

== Early electoral history ==
=== Unsuccessful 1990 race ===
In 1990, he ran for chair of the Council of the District of Columbia, against Democrat John A. Wilson, who was then a council member representing Ward 2. Also running for chair was Libertarian Party candidate Jacques Chevalier. Orange criticized Wilson's chairmanship of the council's Finance and Revenue Committee, noting that the district's financial troubles happened during Wilson's eleven-year tenure. Orange advocated collecting unpaid tax bills, rather than increasing tax rates, as he said Wilson wanted to do. Wilson won the Democratic primary with 82 percent of the vote, to Orange's 18 percent.

In 1991, he was hired as acting director of internal audit for the University of the District of Columbia. The next year, Orange discovered that the university was paying a fuel supplier, Tri-Continental, for fuel it never actually received. According to the District's inspector general, over a period of eighteen months, the District had paid one million dollars to Tri-Continental for fuel it had not received. The day after Orange released his memo naming two university administrators to be at fault, Orange's employment was terminated. The university said that Orange had been hired under an invalid contract.

=== Unsuccessful 1993 race ===
After Wilson's death in 1993, Orange was one of seven individuals to file to run to fill the position of Council Chair. Also filing to run in the race were Ward 4 Councilmember Charlene Drew Jarvis and Linda Cropp. Orange did not collect enough signatures to run, and his candidacy was disqualified by the District of Columbia Board of Elections. Orange's appealed, saying that the District's requirement of filing nominating petitions with 3,000 valid signatures was onerous, but District of Columbia Court of Appeals disagreed, and Orange stayed off the ballot. Orange declared himself a write-in candidate. Clarke won the election with 47 percent of the vote. Write-in votes, including those for Orange, were one percent of the total.

=== Unsuccessful 1995 race ===
In 1994, Orange ran for councilmember to represent Ward 5, along with incumbent Harry Thomas, Sr. and eight other Democratic party candidates. Orange advocated banning new liquor licenses, developing Fort Lincoln, and building a new convention center at New York Avenue and Florida Avenue. Thomas won with 39 percent of the vote, compared to Orange's 17 percent.

== Council of the District of Columbia ==
=== 1998 successful Council race ===
In 1998, Orange ran again for councilmember to represent Ward 5; Harry Thomas, Sr. ran for reelection. The Washington Post's editorial board endorsed Orange's candidacy. Orange emphasized improvements to New York Avenue, improving the economy and schools, and restricting liquor licenses. Orange defeated Thomas, receiving 38 percent of the vote to Thomas' 34 percent. The Post described it as an upset victory. Orange went on to win the general election with 89 percent of the vote.

=== Unsuccessful 2006 mayoral race ===
In 2006, Orange ran for District mayor. During his campaign, he said he was against same-sex marriage. In September 2006, Orange lost his bid for mayor in the Democratic primary, receiving 2.9% of the vote.

From 2007 to 2010, Orange was the regional vice president for Pepco Holdings Inc. for the Washington, D.C., metro area.

=== Unsuccessful council chair race ===
In 2010, Orange announced his candidacy for chair of council of the District of Columbia, challenging at-large council member Kwame Brown for the position. At the time, he was working as the chief financial officer of the National Children's Center. Orange said he was now in favor of same-sex marriage, changing his position from four years earlier, saying "times change." After three credit card companies sued Brown for unpaid bills and Brown said his mortgage and other personal debt totaled around $700,000, Orange said Brown's poor handling of his personal finances should make him unfit to handle the District's finances. Orange was also critical of irregularities in Brown's financial filings for his previous two campaigns, which Brown attributed to accounting errors. Two of Orange's campaign aides resigned due to the negative tone of his campaign. The editorial board of the Washington Post endorsed Orange's candidacy. All but one of the sitting council members endorsed Brown's reelection. Brown won the Democratic primary with 55 percent of the vote, while Orange received 39 percent. Brown prevailed in the general election as well.

When Brown resigned from his at-large council seat, Orange lobbied the District of Columbia Democratic State Committee to be appointed as the interim to replacement on the council, but they voted to appoint Sekou Biddle to the seat instead.

=== Successful 2011 Council race ===
Orange was a candidate in the 2011 special election to fill the at-large seat vacated by Brown; Biddle ran in the special election to keep the seat as well. The editorial board of the Washington Post endorsed the candidacy of Republican Patrick Mara. Orange won election with 28 percent of the vote.

In March 2011, the council was trying to close a budget shortfall, and it considered taxing out-of-state bonds for upper-income individuals. Orange only decided to support the idea on the condition that the council would budget spending $500,000 for an Emancipation Day parade at the Lincoln Theatre, where Orange sat on the board of directors.

In June 2011, the Washington City Paper reported that Orange received more than $100,000 of campaign contributions from Jeffrey Thompson, CEO of a health provider accused of defrauding the D.C. government. When council member Muriel Bowser introduced an ethics bill that would disqualify mayors and council members convicted of felonies while in office, Orange opposed the bill, saying it would create unneeded bureaucracy. Orange supported new restrictions on medical marijuana retailers and adult entertainment businesses in Northeast D.C. Orange was also in favor of using District funds to build Nationals Park.

=== 2012 term and reelection ===
On June 6, 2012, federal prosecutors charged District Council chairman Kwame R. Brown with one count of bank fraud in U.S. District Court; Brown resigned from the council later that day. Upon Kwame R. Brown's resignation, it became the responsibility of the council to vote to appoint one of the at-large council members to the vacant seat of chair. Orange and Phil Mendelson both wanted to be appointed chair. After the council voted to appoint Mendelson the new chair, Orange asked the council to appoint him to Mendelson's former position of chair pro tem. The council voted to appoint Michael A. Brown to the position of chair pro tem. Orange felt appointing an independent council member to a position formerly held by a Democrat was a poor idea.

In 2012, Orange ran for reelection as at-large council member, his fifth campaign in six years. Orange received $26,000 of money orders, which he called "suspicious" campaign donations, all in sequential numbers and written in the same handwriting. The money orders may have been connected to city contractor Jeffrey E. Thompson, whose home and office had been raided by the FBI and the IRS. Jeanne Clarke Harris later admitted she had run a straw donor scheme funded by Thompson. Orange won the Democratic primary with 42 percent of the vote and the subsequent general election with 38 percent of the vote. During his term in office, Orange supported a bill to increase the minimum wage to $12.50 per hour for certain large employers.

In December 2012, health inspectors found unsanitary conditions and rat droppings in a produce market in the Florida Avenue Market. The District of Columbia Department of Health ordered the market be closed immediately. Orange intervened for the owner, who had donated to Orange's campaign, While Orange accepted responsibility of the charges, he insisted he performed a function of constituent service and thus did not violate the council's Code of Conduct or abuse his position. Orange agreed he would attend ethics training and never abuse his position again. Orange said he thought his actions were an acceptable constituent service and that his behavior did not reflect poorly on him at all.

"In the past, this has been clearly acceptable constituent service, but now you have people looking at it a different way," Orange told the Post's Tim Craig. To the Washington Examiner, he said, "I don't think it reflects poorly on me at all" and health inspectors allowed the market to open the next day.

=== Unsuccessful 2014 mayoral race ===
On November 8, 2013, Orange announced that he would run for Mayor of the District of Columbia in the 2014 election. His campaign slogans were "Leaving No One Behind" and "Taking No One for Granted". He supported demolishing Robert F. Kennedy Memorial Stadium and replacing it with a commercial strip, a golf course, a movie sound stage, a hotel, an indoor waterpark, and a film and photography center. In the Democratic primary, he came sixth out of eight candidates, receiving 1,946 votes (2.01%).

=== Unsuccessful 2016 reelection race ===
Orange filed to run for reelection in October 2015. The same month, former Advisory Neighborhood Commissioner Shaw resident David Garber filed to run against Orange in the Democratic primary, calling Orange "a corrupt politician with deep pockets." Robert White, a former aide to District of Columbia Attorney General Karl A. Racine and resident of Brightwood Park, also ran against Orange. The editorial board of the Washington Post endorsed Orange's candidacy. White won the Democratic primary with 43% of the vote, compared to Orange's 41% and Garber's 16%.

=== Committees ===
Orange served on the following committees while on the Council of the District of Columbia:

- Committee on Business, Consumer and Regulatory Affairs (chair during his final term)
- Committee on Finance and Revenue
- Committee on Housing and Committee Development

=== Council resignation ===
On July 28, 2016, the D.C. Chamber of Commerce announced that it had selected Vincent Orange to be the organization's next president. Council rules permit outside employment, and there are laws prohibiting government officials from being involved in matters directly affecting their employer or their potential employer. Orange said he had received guidance from the city's ethics office that his new job would not create a conflict of interest with his council work. His colleagues on the council strongly disputed Orange's claim that there was no conflict of interest. On August 3, Orange dissolved the Committee on Business, Consumer and Regulatory Affairs, which he chaired.

On August 5, Orange announced he would retire from the council on August 15, 2016, the same day on which his Chamber of Commerce position began. Orange officially left the council on August 15, reminding the public of his 12 years of "service above self". No other council members appeared at his press conference. The D.C. Office of Government Ethics said it would soon issue a draft of restrictions that would limit Orange's ability to lobby the council, as required by law.

The D.C. Board of Ethics and Government Accountability ruled in late September 2016 that Orange did not break ethics laws or regulations in seeking the Chamber of Commerce position. The report said that a D.C. Chamber of Commerce official contacted Orange about the job on July 8, Orange interviewed for the job twice in July, and he formally accepted the job on July 27.

=== Unsuccessful 2020 council race ===
In June 2020, Orange left his job at the D.C. Chamber of Commerce to run for an at-large council seat left open by David Grosso's retirement. An issue in the race was DC's paid family leave law, which Orange criticized and suggested repealing. Orange lost the general election with 12% of the vote.

=== 2022 council race ===
In the wake of Councilman McDuffie's decision not to seek another term as ward 5 council member, Orange declared that he would run in 2022.

In the 2022 race, Orange used a DC Stonewall Democrats forum to attack his opponent, Zachary Parker, for not having come out of the closet sooner in his political life, calling Parker's identity "a matter of convenience" and that "it just doesn't add up." Local DC gay community members and activists criticized him for politicizing the process of coming out of the closet; for example, the grassroots organizing group Persist DC said that they were "Still stunned that Vincent Orange chose the Stonewall Dems(!) forum for a shameful, unprovoked attack on [Zachary Parker]'s decision to be public about his sexual orientation. If VO wasn't being outright homophobic, he was at minimum showing catastrophically poor judgement." Similarly, Councilmember Brianne K Nadeau criticized Orange for his actions, saying, "Hell no, VO. You need to do some more work sir. This is not acceptable and the District deserves better."

In repeated tweets in response to the criticism, Orange asserted that Parker "made this issue" when Parker announced that he was gay at the start of his run for the council member seat, asking, "why now Mr Parker" (sic) in repeated tweets.

=== 2026 mayoral race ===
In January 2026, Orange announced he was running in the 2026 Washington, D.C., mayoral election. He stood fifth in the Democratc primary with 2.54% of the vote and failed to advance to the general election.

== D.C. Chamber of Commerce presidency ==
Orange's appointment as the president of the D.C. Chamber of Commerce (DCCoC) was effective at noon on August 15, 2016. Orange said that, due to legal restrictions on his ability to lobby his former Council colleagues, he would, for the immediate future, focus on adding new members to the DCCoC and raising funds for its operations. The Chamber's board announced on July 16, 2020 that Orange would step down from the organization, effective July 30, 2020.

== Personal life ==
Orange lives in Ward 5, with his wife, Gwendolyn. He has three children, and is a member of the Metropolitan AME Church.
