= Yvette Alexander =

American politician (born 1961)

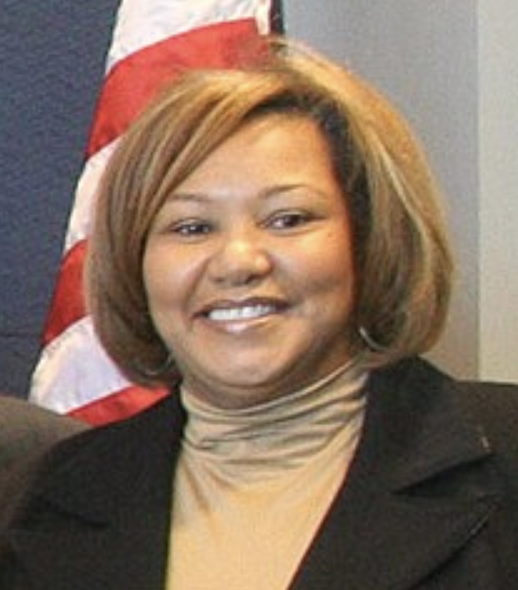

Member of the Council of the District of Columbia from Ward 7
- In office January 2, 2007 – January 3, 2017
- Preceded by: Vincent C. Gray
- Succeeded by: Vincent C. Gray

Personal details
- Born: October 1, 1961 (age 64) Washington, D.C., U.S.
- Party: Democratic
- Education: Howard University (BBA); Trinity Washington University (attended)

Yvette M. Alexander (born October 1, 1961, in the District of Columbia) is a Democratic politician in Washington, D.C. She represented Ward 7 on the Council of the District of Columbia from 2007 to 2017.

== Education ==
Alexander has a Bachelor of Business Administration from Howard University, and did graduate work at Trinity College.

== Political career ==
On May 1, 2007, Alexander won the special election to succeed her political mentor Vincent C. Gray. Gray had represented Ward 7 before he became council chairman in January. She received 34 percent of the vote, beating 17 other candidates (14 Democrats and 4 independents).

She faced a Democratic primary for re-election on September 9, 2008. Notable opponents in that Democratic primary were John Campbell and Robin Hammond Marlin. No individuals filed to appear on the ballot for the Republican or Statehood-Green parties. Alexander won the primary and general election.

Alexander lobbied other state delegations for DC voting rights at the 2004 Democratic Convention in Boston, Massachusetts. She was an Obama superdelegate (though formally unpledged) to the 2008 Democratic National Convention, although she had endorsed Barack Obama before Hillary Clinton conceded the race.

After losing her council seat in 2017, Alexander started a health care consulting practice.

== Political positions ==
Alexander was one of two DC council members to reject gay marriage when it was put to vote November 10, 2009, by the Council of the District of Columbia.

Alexander opposed DC's Death with Dignity legislation that would allow terminally ill patients to end their suffering.

Alexander was active in the campaign to have a DC-based barbershop properly replace its lighting. She insisted the responsible government agency, DCRA, use its oversight to get the business to correct the sign from "Sex Barbershop" to "Unisex Barbershop".

== Personal life ==
Alexander is Catholic.
