= Mary Cheh =

American politician from Washington, D.C.

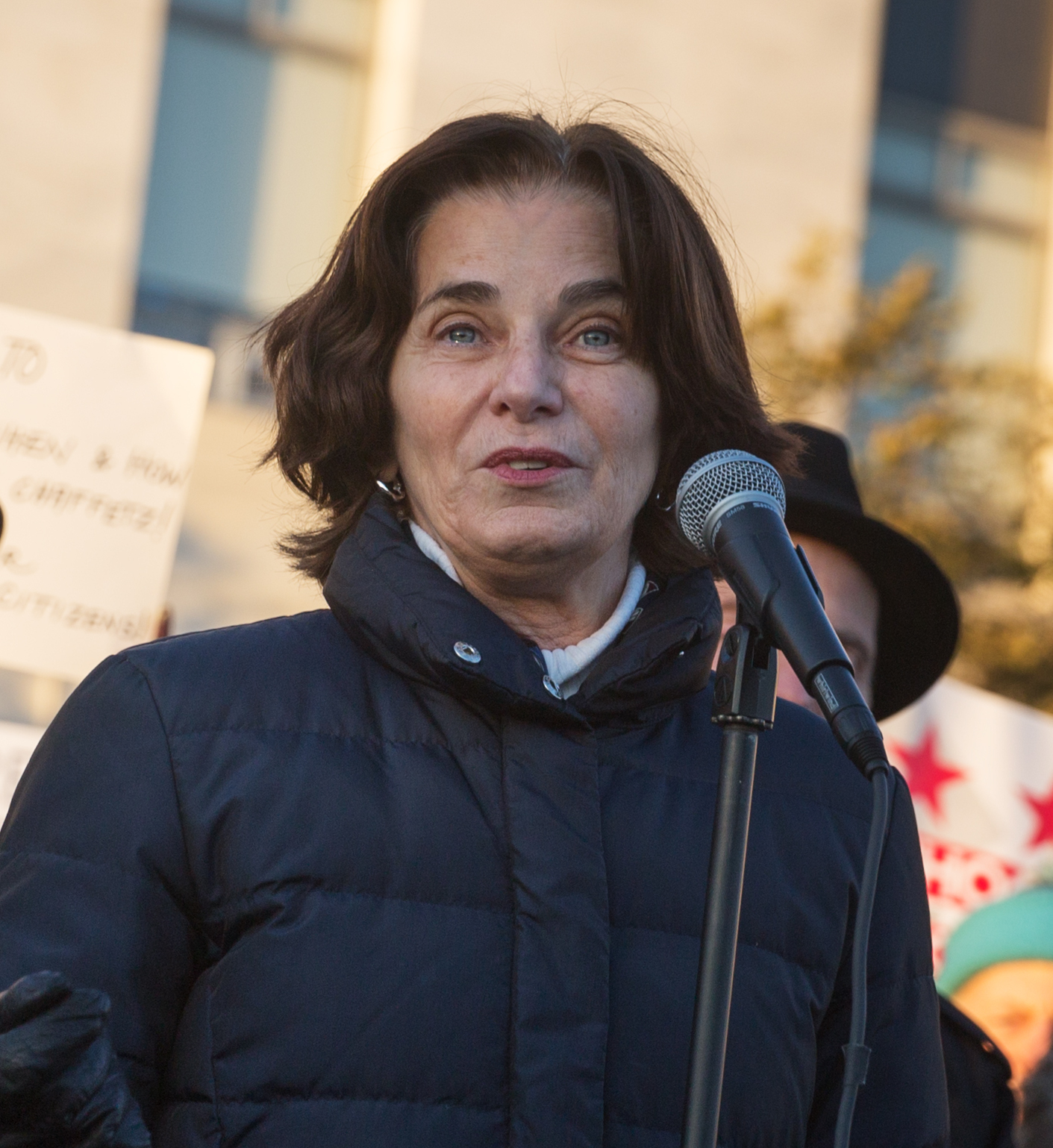

Chair of the Council of the District of Columbia
- Acting
- In office June 6, 2012 – June 13, 2012
- Preceded by: Kwame R. Brown
- Succeeded by: Phil Mendelson

Chair pro tempore of the Council of the District of Columbia
- In office January 2, 2011 – June 13, 2012
- Preceded by: Jack Evans
- Succeeded by: Michael Brown

Member of the Council of the District of Columbia from Ward 3
- In office January 2, 2007 – January 2, 2023
- Preceded by: Kathy Patterson
- Succeeded by: Matthew Frumin

Personal details
- Born: 1950 (age 75–76) Elizabeth, New Jersey, U.S.
- Party: Democratic
- Spouse: Neil Lewis
- Education: Rutgers University, New Brunswick (BA); Rutgers University, Newark (JD); Harvard University (LLM)

Mary M. Cheh /ˈtʃeɪ/ (born 1950) is an American Democratic politician from Washington, D.C. From 2007 to 2023, she served on the Council of the District of Columbia representing Ward 3.

== Background and family ==
Mary Cheh was born in Elizabeth, New Jersey. The first in her family to graduate from high school, Cheh is a Phi Beta Kappa graduate of Douglass College (the women's college of Rutgers University–New Brunswick) and has law degrees from Rutgers School of Law-Newark and Harvard Law School.

Cheh has been a resident of Ward 3 since 1980. She has two daughters, Jane and Nora, who were born and raised in the District, attended Murch Elementary School and Georgetown Day School, and now work as lawyers.

== Professional experience ==
Upon graduation from law school, Cheh served as a law clerk to the Hon. Richard J. Hughes, chief justice of the New Jersey Supreme Court. Cheh then joined the Washington office of Fried, Frank, Shriver, Harris & Kempleman as an associate. In 1979, Cheh joined the George Washington University Law School, becoming the Elyce Zenoff Research Professor of Law. There, she has received teaching and service awards and serves as a member and former chair of the George Washington Law Public Interest Committee. Cheh is also a guest lecturer in Constitutional Law at the Concord School of Law.

In 1983, Cheh took a sabbatical to do pro bono work in South Africa for the Centre for Applied Legal Studies. Then in 1986, she served as a Special Assistant United States Attorney in D.C. She has been a visiting professor at the Concord School of Law, University of North Carolina – Chapel Hill and the University of California – Hastings.

Cheh has also served as a consultant to the National Institute of Justice and the President's Commission on Organized Crime, and she chaired the subcommittee on criminal justice for the D.C. Circuit Court's Task Force on Gender.

Cheh currently serves as a member of the Rules Committee of the Court of Appeals for the Armed Forces, on the Board of Directors of the National Institute of Military Justice, and as a member of the ACLU Litigation Screening Committee. She has been and continues to be a frequent speaker and media commentator on legal affairs. Cheh works as a professor at the George Washington University Law School and teaches bar review lectures during the summer months.

== Career as Councilmember ==
Cheh was first elected to the Council of the District of Columbia in 2006, defeating her Republican opponent Theresa Conroy. Cheh replaced Kathy Patterson, who unsuccessfully ran for the seat of Chair of the Council. Cheh was reelected in 2010 by a substantial margin over Republican candidate David Hedgepeth.

As Councilmember, Cheh has chaired several committees, currently serving as Chair of the Committee on Transportation and the Environment. Previously, she chaired the Committee on Public Services and Consumer Affairs and the Committee on Government Operations.

Cheh served as Chair Pro Tempore from 2010 until 2012, when she became the temporary chair due to the resignation of Chairman Kwame Brown on June 6, 2012. She stepped down from that role when Phil Mendelson was elected chair on June 13, 2012.

During her time on the Council, Cheh has introduced over 850 separate bills and resolutions. She has led five major Council investigations: CareFirst BlueCross BlueShield's failure to comply with its nonprofit mission, 2008 election electronic voting failures Mayoral personnel practices, the improper donation of District fire trucks to the Dominican Republic, and procurement practices at the Office of the Chief Technology Officer.

Cheh has authored several comprehensive reform measures. The Healthy Schools Act of 2010 makes breakfast free to all DCPS and public charter school students; enhances the nutrition of school meals by including more whole grains, a variety of fresh fruits and vegetables, less fat, and less sodium; requires schools to serve locally-grown, unprocessed foods in school meals whenever possible; and increases the amount of physical activity and health education required of students. The Omnibus Election Reform Act of 2009 allows for pre-registration for voters who will be 18 at the time of the next election, provides for early voting, and permits individuals to vote on Election Day. Furthermore, the Clean and Affordable Energy Act of 2008 created the District of Columbia Sustainable Energy Utility, which administers sustainable energy programs in the District.

Cheh introduced the Taxicab Service Improvement Amendment Act of 2012, which requires taxis in the District to use GPS, credit card readers and modern meters, and uniform dome lights and color schemes. Similarly, she co-sponsored introduced emergency measures to keep application-based services like Uber, Lyft, and Sidecar street legal.

In 2022, Cheh authored legislation to require new buildings in the District to be constructed with "bird-friendly" materials, including glass, to reduce bird–window collisions.

In February 2022, Cheh announced that she would not seek a fifth term as Councilmember.

== Committees ==
Cheh currently serves on the following committees:

- Committee on Transportation and the Environment (Chair)
- Committee on Judiciary
- Committee on Health and Human Services

== Personal life ==
Cheh married New York Times reporter Neil Lewis with whom she has two children.

Council of the District of Columbia
Preceded by Jack Evans	Chair pro tempore of the Council of the District of Columbia; 2011–2012	Succeeded by Michael Brown
Political offices
Preceded by Kwame R. Brown	Chair of the Council of the District of Columbia; Acting; 2012	Succeeded by Phil Mendelson
