= Kwame R. Brown =

American politician (born 1970)

Kwame Brown
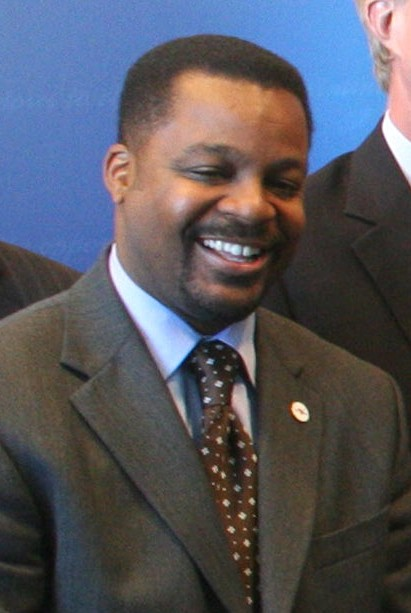

Chair of the Council of the District of Columbia
- In office January 2, 2011 – June 6, 2012
- Preceded by: Vincent C. Gray
- Succeeded by: Mary Cheh (acting)

Member of the Council of the District of Columbia from the at-large district
- In office January 3, 2005 – January 2, 2011
- Preceded by: Harold Brazil
- Succeeded by: Sekou Biddle

Personal details
- Born: October 13, 1970 (age 55) Washington, D. C., U.S.
- Party: Democratic
- Spouse: Marcia Brown
- Education: Morgan State University (BA)

Kwame R. Brown (born October 13, 1970) is an American politician in Washington, D.C., who was an at-large member of the council from 2005 to 2011 and chairman of the Council of the District of Columbia from 2011 until his resignation in June 2012.

== Biography ==
Kwame R. Brown was born on October 13, 1970, at Columbia Hospital for Women in Washington, D.C. He was the second son of Marshall Brown (March 10, 1945 – May 2, 2017) and Cammie Elizabeth (née Randall) Brown (now Jeffers), and brother of Che Marshall Brown, Jr. While he grew up primarily with his mother in Prince William County, Brown was sent to Washington to attend Woodrow Wilson High School, where he participated in the Mayor's Youth Leadership Institute. Brown attended Talladega College (where he met his future wife, Marcia) and graduated from Morgan State University in Baltimore, earning a Bachelor of Arts in marketing in 1994. Brown attended the Minority Business Executive Program & Advanced Business Executive Program at the Amos Tuck School of Business, Dartmouth College and the Senior Executives in State & Local Government Program at the John F. Kennedy School of Government, Harvard University. He married his wife Marcia Kaye (née Barnes) on June 4, 1994, and has two children.

Brown was first elected to the Council in 2004, winning 55.4% of votes citywide in the general election, after defeating incumbent Councilmember Harold Brazil in the primary with 54.09% of the vote.

Brown was up for reelection in 2008 and faced no opposition in the Democratic primary. When asked why no one was running against him, he stated, "People run because they're tired of elected officials not doing anything." Brown, who lives in Hillcrest, continued, 'No one's running, because I've done what I said I was going to do."

== Political career ==
Brown co-introduced the School Modernization and Financing Act of 2005, which was to construct, renovate, and modernize public schools in the District. The Act also authorized the mayor to borrow $1 billion, which would be repaid with $60 million annual payments from revenue from the future District lottery.

Later, Brown authored the amendment that led to $48 million for vocational education to build the Phelps Architecture, Construction and Engineering Academy. Students at the newly built school would be able to attend courses in vocational subjects and pursue apprenticeship and certification.

Brown authored the Creative Learning Program Act to require that all elementary schools are taught music, visual arts, and physical education each week effective the 2008-2009 school year. The Act requires the subjects to be taught weekly but does not specify the curriculum or guidelines of the educational programs.

Brown authored the Compliance and Enforcement Agency Establishment Act of 2007, which establishes a Compliance and Enforcement Agency in the District government. The Agency would be responsible to ensure that developers meet environmental standards, affordable-housing requirements, and laws involving hiring local employees.

Brown cosponsored the Small Business Commercial Property Tax Relief Act of 2007. The Act reduced the commercial and industrial property tax rate for properties assessed at less than $3 million. The Act also increased the amount of tangible personal property exempt from the personal property tax to $225,000.

In addition, Brown authored the Minority and Women-Owned Business Assessment Act of 2007 to determine how many minority- and women-owned businesses were receiving contracts from the District. The Act also authorized an assessment of whether the District government should increase the number of contracts awarded to such businesses and, if so, how to do so.

During his tenure as an at-large member of the City Council, Brown served as Chair of the Council's Committee on Economic Development.

== Council chair ==
On March 31, 2010, Brown announced that he would pursue the DC Council Chairmanship, one day after the current seat holder Vincent C. Gray announced his candidacy for Mayor for that year's election, making him ineligible to regain his office, which expired in January 2011. This eliminated earlier speculation that Brown would pursue the mayoral seat against incumbent Adrian Fenty.

On September 14, 2010, Brown won the Democratic primary for chairperson, receiving 55 percent of the vote to former Ward 5 Councilman Vincent Orange's 39 percent and school board member Dorothy Douglas' 6 percent. He faced no opposition in the November 2 general election, and Brown was sworn in as chairman of the DC Council on January 2, 2011.

In the midst of a significant revenue shortfall for the District, as chairman-elect of the Council, Brown requested the District order a Lincoln Navigator L for his use. The vehicle costs the city $1,963.28 a month to lease and it was shown that Brown rejected an earlier model that did not have a "black on black" interior.

On June 6, 2012, Federal prosecutors charged D.C. Council Chairman Kwame Brown with one count of bank fraud in U.S. District Court. He resigned from the council later that day. The following day, Brown was charged with misdemeanor unlawful cash campaign expenditures for violating the District's election law that prohibits cash campaign expenditures in excess of $50. Brown pled guilty on June 8, 2012, to the bank fraud charge, a felony, in the U.S. District Court for the District of Columbia. Also that day, he pled guilty in the Superior Court of the District of Columbia to the campaign finance violation, a misdemeanor. He was sentenced to one day in jail, six months of home detention on a federal charge of bank fraud. He also was ordered to perform 480 hours of community service. The investigation by the FBI implicated Brown's brother, Che, who was sentenced to prison for bank fraud.

== Election history ==
2004 Council of the District of Columbia, At Large, Democratic Primary Election

Kwame R. Brown (D) 54%
Harold Brazil (D) 32%
Sam Brooks (D) 13%
Write-in 0%

2004 Council of the District of Columbia, At Large, General Election

Kwame R. Brown (D) 55%
Carol Schwartz (R) 31%
Laurent Ross (STG) 8%
A.D. "Tony" Dominguez (I) 5%
Write-in 1%

2008 Council of the District of Columbia, At Large, Democratic Primary Election

Kwame R. Brown (D) 100%

2008 Council of the District of Columbia, At Large, General Election

Kwame R. Brown (D) 48%
Michael A. Brown (I) 20%
Write-in 11%
Patrick Mara (R) 10%

2010 Council of the District of Columbia, Chairperson, Democratic Primary Election

Kwame R. Brown (D) 55%
Vincent B. Orange, Sr. (D) 39%
Dorothy Douglas (D) 6%

2010 Council of the District of Columbia, Chairperson, General Election

Kwame R. Brown (D) 88%
Ann C. Wilcox (STG) 10%
Write-in 2%

== Committees ==
- Committee on Economic Development – Chairperson
- Committee on Government Operations and the Environment
- Committee on Libraries, Parks and Recreation
- Committee on Finance and Revenue
- Committee on Public Works and Transportation
- Special Committee on Statehood and Self-Determination

Political offices
Preceded by Vincent C. Gray	Chair of the Council of the District of Columbia; 2011–2012	Succeeded by Mary Cheh; Acting
