= 2026 Council of the District of Columbia election =

US Election

- November 3, 2026

7 of the 13 seats in the Council of the District of Columbia 7 seats needed for a majority
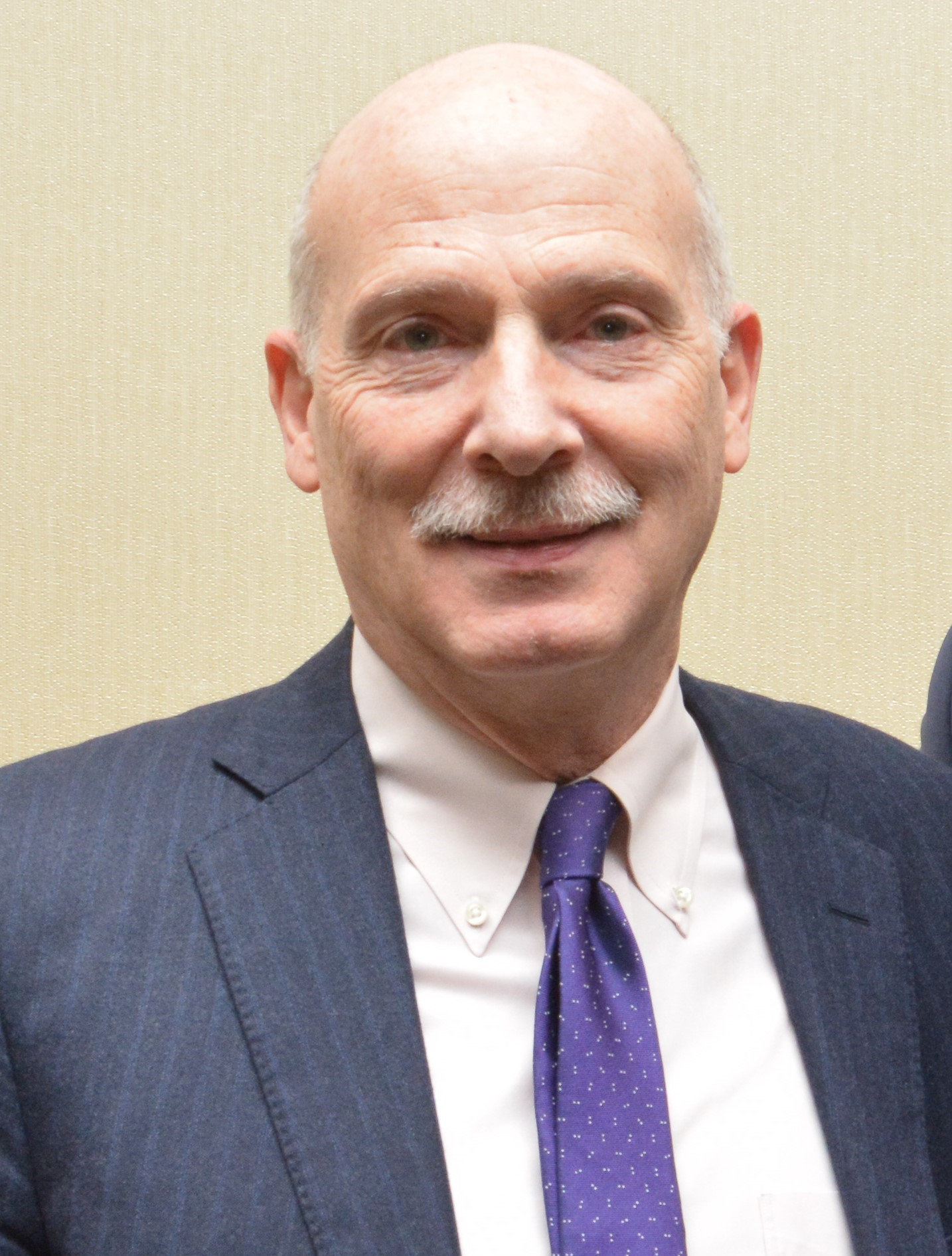

	Majority party	Minority party
Leader	Phil Mendelson	N/A
Party	Democratic	Independent
Seats before	11	2

The 2026 Council of the District of Columbia election will be held on November 3, 2026, to elect seven members to the Council of the District of Columbia. Primary elections will take place on June 16. This will be the first council election to use ranked-choice voting following the implementation of Initiative 83.

== Special elections ==
=== 2025 Ward 8 special election ===
A special election was held in Ward 8 on July 15, 2025 to fill the term of councilmember Trayon White, after he was expelled from the council in February 2025. White was re-elected with 27.7% of the vote.

=== 2026 at-large special election ===
A special election was held on June 16, 2026 to fill the term of councilmember Kenyan McDuffie, after he resigned on January 5, 2026, to run for mayor. Former at-large councilmember Elissa Silverman won the election with 55.32% of the vote.

== Summary ==
Position	Incumbent				Certified candidates ▌Democratic ▌Statehood Green ▌Independent ▌Republican
Position	Member	Party	First elected	Status	Certified candidates ▌Democratic ▌Statehood Green ▌Independent ▌Republican
Chairperson	Phil Mendelson	Democratic	2012 (special)	Incumbent renominated.	▌ ✓ Phil Mendelson (Democratic); ▌Abi-Ananiah Prudent (Republican)
At-large	Anita Bonds	Democratic	2012 (special)	Incumbent retiring.	▌ ✓ Oye Owolewa (Democratic); ▌ ✓ Elissa Silverman (Independent); ▌Darrell Green (Republican); ▌Darryl Moch (Statehood Green)
At-large	Elissa Silverman	Independent	2014; 2022 (lost); 2026 (special)	Incumbent running.	▌ ✓ Oye Owolewa (Democratic); ▌ ✓ Elissa Silverman (Independent); ▌Darrell Green (Republican); ▌Darryl Moch (Statehood Green)
Ward 1	Brianne Nadeau	Democratic	2014	Incumbent retiring.	▌ ✓ Aparna Raj (Democratic); ▌Jett James Jasper (Republican); ▌Ryan Prince (Independent); ▌Jude Crannitch (Statehood Green)
Ward 3	Matt Frumin	Democratic	2022	Incumbent renominated.	▌ ✓ Matt Frumin (Democratic)
Ward 5	Zachary Parker	Democratic	2022	Incumbent renominated.	▌ ✓ Zachary Parker (Democratic); ▌Joyce Robinson-Paul (Statehood Green); ▌Jeffrey Kihien-Palza (Republican)
Ward 6	Charles Allen	Democratic	2014	Incumbent renominated.	▌ ✓ Charles Allen (Democratic); ▌Jorge Rice (Republican)

== Chairperson ==
2026 Council of the District of Columbia Chairperson of the Council Election
- November 3, 2026
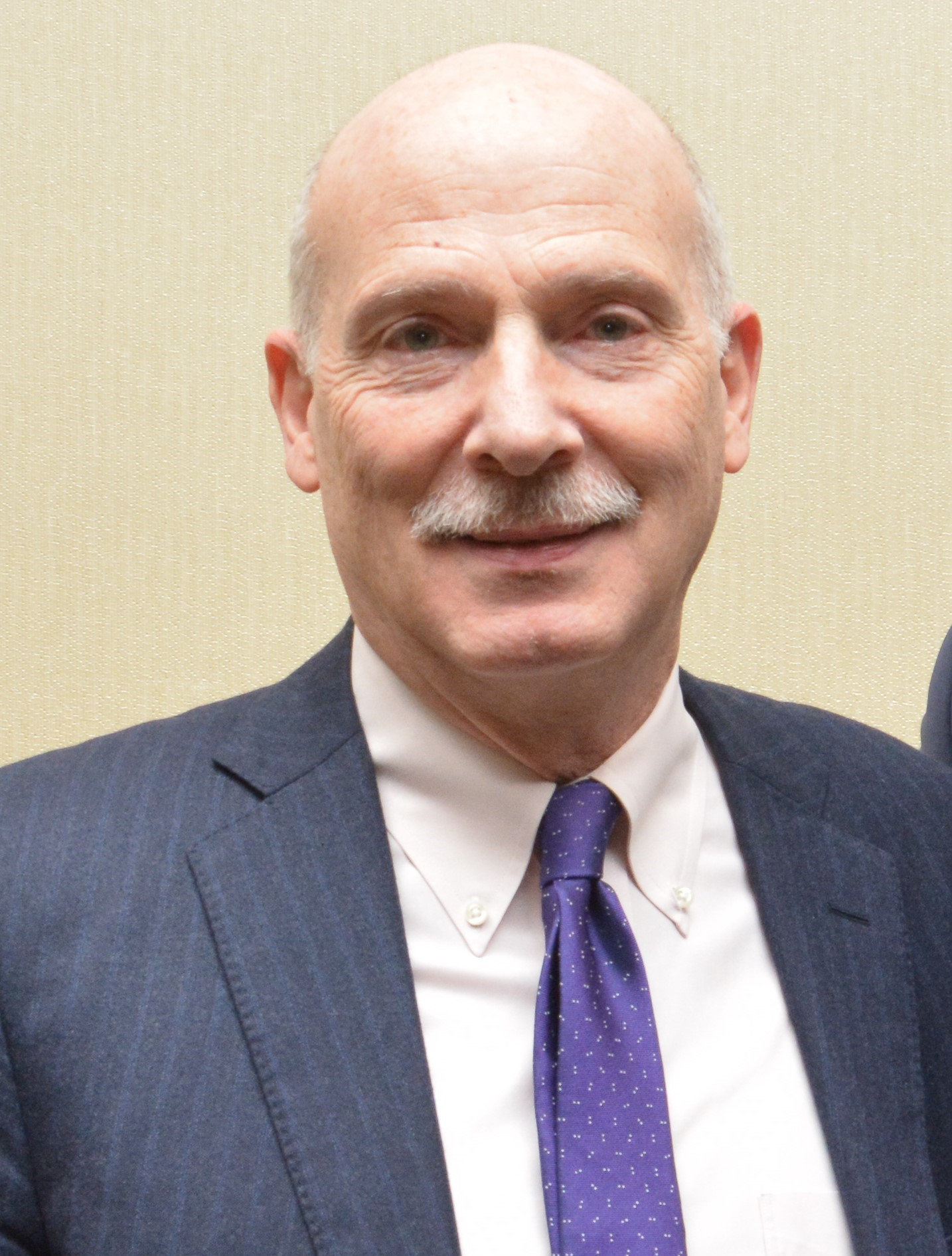

Nominee	Phil Mendelson	Abi-Ananiah Prudent
Party	Democratic	Republican
Chairperson before election
Phil Mendelson
Democratic
Elected Chairperson
TBD

Incumbent Democratic chairperson Phil Mendelson was re-elected to a third term with 83.4% of the vote in 2022. Mendelson is running for a fifth term in 2026.

=== Democratic primary ===
Candidates

- Phil Mendelson, incumbent chairperson (2012–present)
- Patricia Stamper, former ANC member for district 7C (write-in)

Withdrawn

- Jack Evans, former councilmember from Ward 2 (1991–2020)

Declined

- Christina Henderson, at-large councilmember (2021–present)

Endorsements

Phil Mendelson

Labor unions

- United Food and Commercial Workers local 400

Organizations

- Capital Stonewall Democrats
- DC Association of Realtors

2026 Council of the District of Columbia Chairperson Democratic primary
Party	Candidate	Votes	%
Democratic	Phil Mendelson (incumbent)	104,316	95.81
Write-in		4,562	4.19
Total votes		108,878	100.00

=== Republican primary ===
Candidates

- Abi-Ananiah Prudent

2026 Council of the District of Columbia Chairperson Republican primary
Party	Candidate	Votes	%
Republican	Abi-Ananiah Prudent	2,328	90.13
Write-in		255	9.87
Total votes		2,583	100.00

=== Statehood Green primary ===
2026 Council of the District of Columbia Chairperson Statehood Green primary
Party	Candidate	Votes	%
	Write-in	238	100.00
Total votes		238	100.00

== At-large ==
2026 Council of the District of Columbia At-Large Election
- November 3, 2026
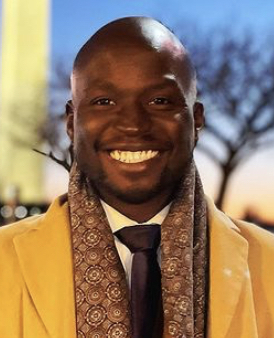

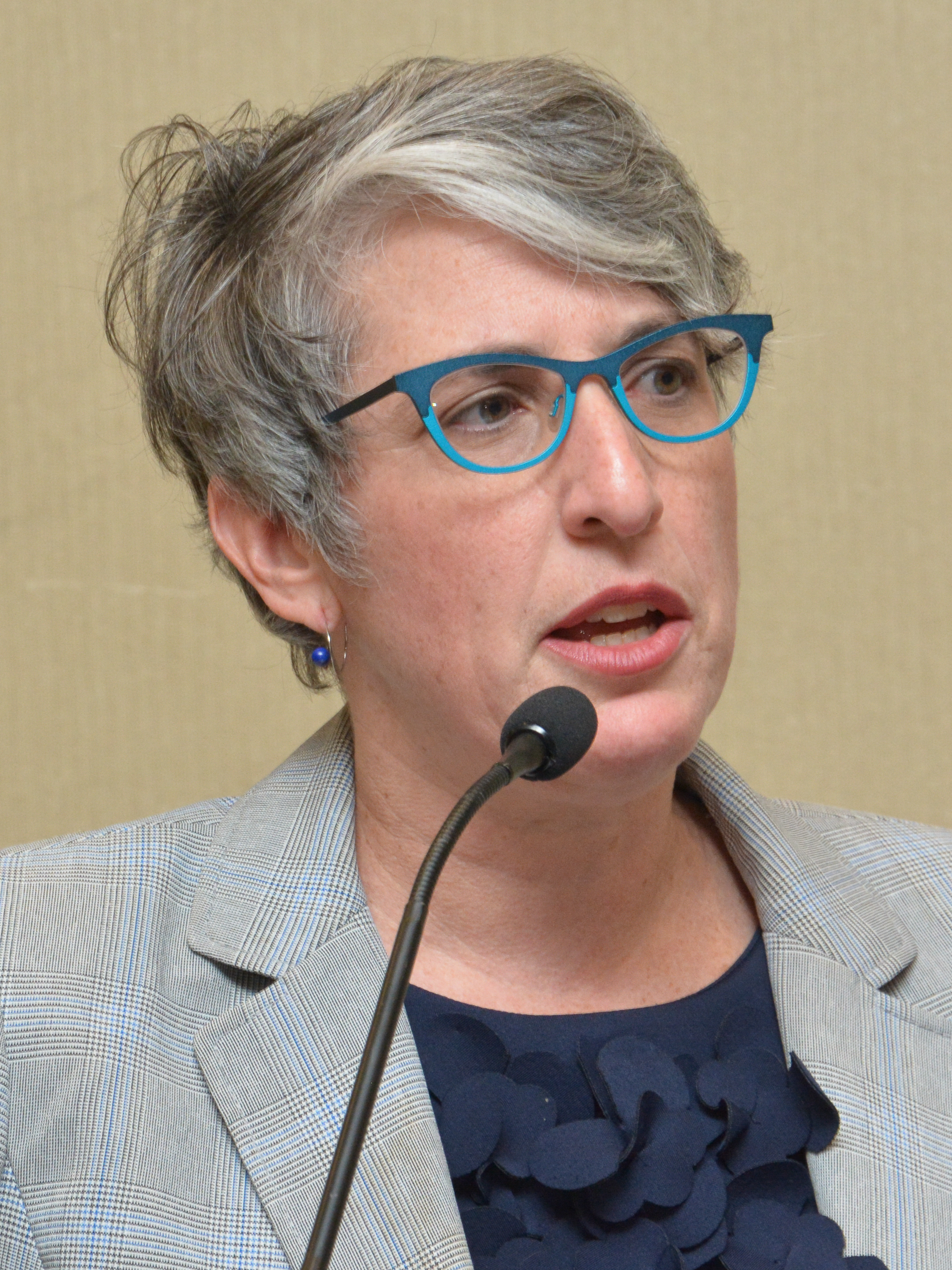

Nominee	Oye Owolewa	Elissa Silverman
Party	Democratic	Independent
Nominee	Darrell Green	Darryl Moch
Party	Republican	DC Statehood Green
Incumbent Councilmembers
Anita Bonds (Dem.)
Elissa Silverman (Ind.)

Two at-large seats are up for election; the incumbents are Democrat Anita Bonds and independent Elissa Silverman. Bonds is not running for re-election and Silverman — who won a special election to fill a remaining term of councilmember Kenyan McDuffie, is running for re-election. Only one at-large member can be a member of the majority party.

=== Democratic primary ===
Candidates

- Kevin Chavous, staffer to Bonds and son of former councilmember Kevin P. Chavous
- Dwight Davis, former DCPS principal
- Dyana Forester, labor relations advisor to Maryland Governor Wes Moore and former president of the Metro-Washington AFL-CIO
- Fred Hill, former Chairman of the DC Board of Zoning Adjustment
- Gregory Jackson, former deputy director of the White House Office of Gun Violence Prevention and special assistant to President Joe Biden
- Leniqua’dominique Jenkins, former council staffer
- Candace Tiana Nelson, former chief of staff to councilmember Janeese Lewis George
- Lisa Raymond, former president of the District of Columbia State Board of Education
- Oye Owolewa, shadow congressperson from the District of Columbia's at-large congressional district (2021–present)

Withdrawn

- Nate Fleming, former shadow congressperson, staffer for councilmember Trayon White, and candidate for the at-large council seat in 2022 and the Ward 7 seat in 2024 Council of the District of Columbia election
- Eric Goulet, member of the District of Columbia State Board of Education from Ward 3
- Patricia Stamper, former ANC 7C member (running for council chair)

Declined

- Anita Bonds, incumbent councilmember

Endorsements

Kevin Chavous

Labor unions

- AFSCME DC Council 20

Executive branch officials

- Eric Holder, former United States Attorney General (2009-2015)

Local officials

- Anita Bonds, incumbent at-large councilmember (2012–present)

Organizations

- Greater Capital Area Association of REALTORS (co-endorsement with Raymond)
Dwight Davis

Public figures

- Martin Luther King III, human rights activist, philanthropist, and son of Martin Luther King Jr.
Dyana Forester

Labor unions

- 1199SEIU United Healthcare Workers East
- Amalgamated Transit Union Local 689 (ranked first)
- American Federation of Government Employees District 14
- United Association of Apprenticeships Plumbers & Gasfitters Local 5
- United Association of Apprenticeships Steamfitters Local 602
- UFCW Local 400
- Washington Teachers Union Local 6 (co-endorsement with Owolewa)

Federal officials

- Angela Alsobrooks, U.S. senator from Maryland (2025-present)

State officials

- Wes Moore, governor of Maryland (2023-present)

Organizations

- Jews United for Justice (ranked second)
Greg Jackson

State governors

- Kathleen Sebelius, Kansas

U.S. representatives

- Maxwell Frost, FL-10

Mayors

- Brandon Scott, mayor of Baltimore, Maryland (2020-present)

Local officials

- Brandon Best, member of the District of Columbia State Board of Education from Ward 6

Individuals

- Steve Kerr, head coach of the Golden State Warriors

Organizations

- Brady Campaign
- The Collective PAC
Candace Tiana Nelson

Organizations

- Jews United for Justice (ranked second)
Oye Owolewa

Labor unions

- Amalgamated Transit Union Local 689 (ranked second)
- International Association of Fire Fighters local 36
- LiUNA Baltimore/Washington
- UNITE HERE Local 23
- Washington Teachers Union Local 6 (co-endorsement with Forester)

Local officials

- Brianne Nadeau, councilmember from Ward 1 (2015–present)

Organizations

- Capital Stonewall Democrats
- Jews United for Justice
- Sierra Club DC
- Working Families Party
Lisa Raymond

Labor unions

- International Association of Fire Fighters local 36

Local officials

- Charles Allen, councilmember from Ward 6 (2015–present)
- Mary Cheh, former Ward 3 councilmember

Organizations

- Greater Capital Area Association of REALTORS (co-endorsement with Chavous)
- Greater Greater Washington

Fundraising

Campaign finance reports as of January 31, 2026
Candidate	Raised	Spent	Cash on hand
Oye Owolewa (D)	$428,799	$215,609	$213,190
Candace Tiana Nelson (D)	$161,518	$104,631	$56,887
Kevin Chavous (D)	$172,055	$61,815	$110,240
Lisa Raymond (D)	$242,237	$67,748	$174,489
Dyana Forester (D)	$113,154	$27,119	$86,035
Leniqua’dominique Jenkins (D)	$15,633	$0.00	$15,633
Greg Jackson (D)	$194,588	$48,863	$147,725
Dwight Davis (D)	$21,917	$21,772	$145
Fred Hill (D)	$42,801	$21,081	$21,720
Source: District of Columbia Office of Campaign Finance

Debate

2026 Council of the District of Columbia at-large seat Democratic primary debate
No.	Date	Host	Moderator	Link	Democratic	Democratic	Democratic	Democratic	Democratic	Democratic	Democratic	Democratic	Democratic
Key: P Participant A Absent N Not invited I Invited W Withdrawn													
Key: P Participant A Absent N Not invited I Invited W Withdrawn					Kevin Chavous	Dwight Davis	Dyana Forester	Fred Hill	Gregory Jackson	Leniqua’dominique Jenkins	Candace Nelson	Oye Owolewa	Lisa Raymond
1	Apr. 28, 2026	District of Columbia Board of Elections	Michael Brice-Saddler	YouTube	P	P	P	P	P	P	P	P	P

2026 Council of the District of Columbia At-Large Democratic primary results
Party	Candidate	Round 1			Round 2			Round 3			Round 4			Round 5			Round 6			Round 7			Round 8	
Party	Candidate	Votes	%	Transfer	Votes	%	Transfer	Votes	%	Transfer	Votes	%	Transfer	Votes	%	Transfer	Votes	%	Transfer	Votes	%	Transfer	Votes	%
Democratic	Oye Owolewa	44,836	34.56	+ 62	44,898	34.67	+ 842	45,710	35.49	+ 1,541	47,251	36.90	+ 1,108	48,359	38.29	+ 1,568	49,927	40.17	+ 4,370	54,297	44.70	+ 4,892	59,189	50.93
Democratic	Lisa Raymond	20,292	15.64	+ 34	20,326	15.70	+ 231	20,557	15.96	+ 597	21,154	16.52	+ 1,547	22,701	17.97	+ 1,209	23,910	19.24	+ 3,060	26,970	22.20	+ 5,314	32,284	27.78
Democratic	Kevin Chavous	16,973	13.08	+ 22	16,995	13.12	+ 219	17,214	13.36	+ 538	17,752	13.86	+ 908	18,660	14.77	+ 1,146	19,806	15.93	+ 1,662	21,468	17.67	+ 3,282	24,750	21.30
Democratic	Gregory Jackson	14,174	10.92	+ 40	14,214	10.98	+ 227	14,441	11.21	+ 503	14,944	11.67	+ 865	15,809	12.52	+ 1,207	17,016	13.69	+ 1,709	18,725	15.42	18,725	Eliminated	
Democratic	Candace Tiana Nelson	9,900	7.63	+ 21	9,921	7.66	+ 763	10,684	8.29	+ 814	11,498	8.98	+ 399	11,897	9.42	+ 1,741	13,638	10.97	13,638	Eliminated				
Democratic	Dwight Davis	7,745	5.97	+ 12	7,757	5.99	+ 210	7,967	6.19	+ 429	8,396	6.56	+ 478	8,874	7.03	8,874	Eliminated							
Democratic	Fred Hill	6,793	5.24	+ 11	6,804	5.25	+ 122	6,926	5.38	+ 138	7,064	5.52	7,064	Eliminated										
Democratic	Dyana Forester	4,976	3.84	+ 14	4,990	3.85	+ 312	5,302	4.12	5,302	Eliminated													
Democratic	Leniqua’dominique Jenkins	3,585	2.76	+ 3	3,588	2.77	3,588	Eliminated																
Write-in		474	0.37	474	Eliminated																			
Continuing ballots		142,408	100.00		142,153	99.82		141,461	99.34		140,719	98.81		122,923	97.58		119,592	96.17		134,120	94.18		128,883	90.50
Exhausted ballots		–		+ 255	255	0.18	+ 692	947	0.66	+ 742	1,689	1.19	+ 1,759	3,448	2.42	+ 2,003	5,451	3.83	+ 2,837	8,288	5.82	+ 5,237	13,525	9.50
Total votes		142,408	100.00		142,408	100.00		142,408	100.00		142,408	100.00		142,408	100.00		142,408	100.00		142,408	100.00		142,408	100.00

=== Republican primary ===
Candidates

- Darrell Green

2026 Council of the District of Columbia At-Large Republican primary
Party	Candidate	Votes	%
Republican	Darrell Green	2,536	91.06
Write-in		249	8.94
Total votes		2,785	100.00

=== Statehood Green primary ===
Candidates

- Darryl Moch

2026 Council of the District of Columbia At-Large Statehood Green primary
Party	Candidate	Votes	%
DC Statehood Green	Darryl Moch	574	77.05
Write-in		171	22.95
Total votes		745	100.00

=== Independents ===
Candidates

- Elissa Silverman, incumbent at-large councilmember (2026–present; 2015–2023)

== Ward 1 ==
2026 Council of the District of Columbia Ward 1 Election
- November 3, 2026
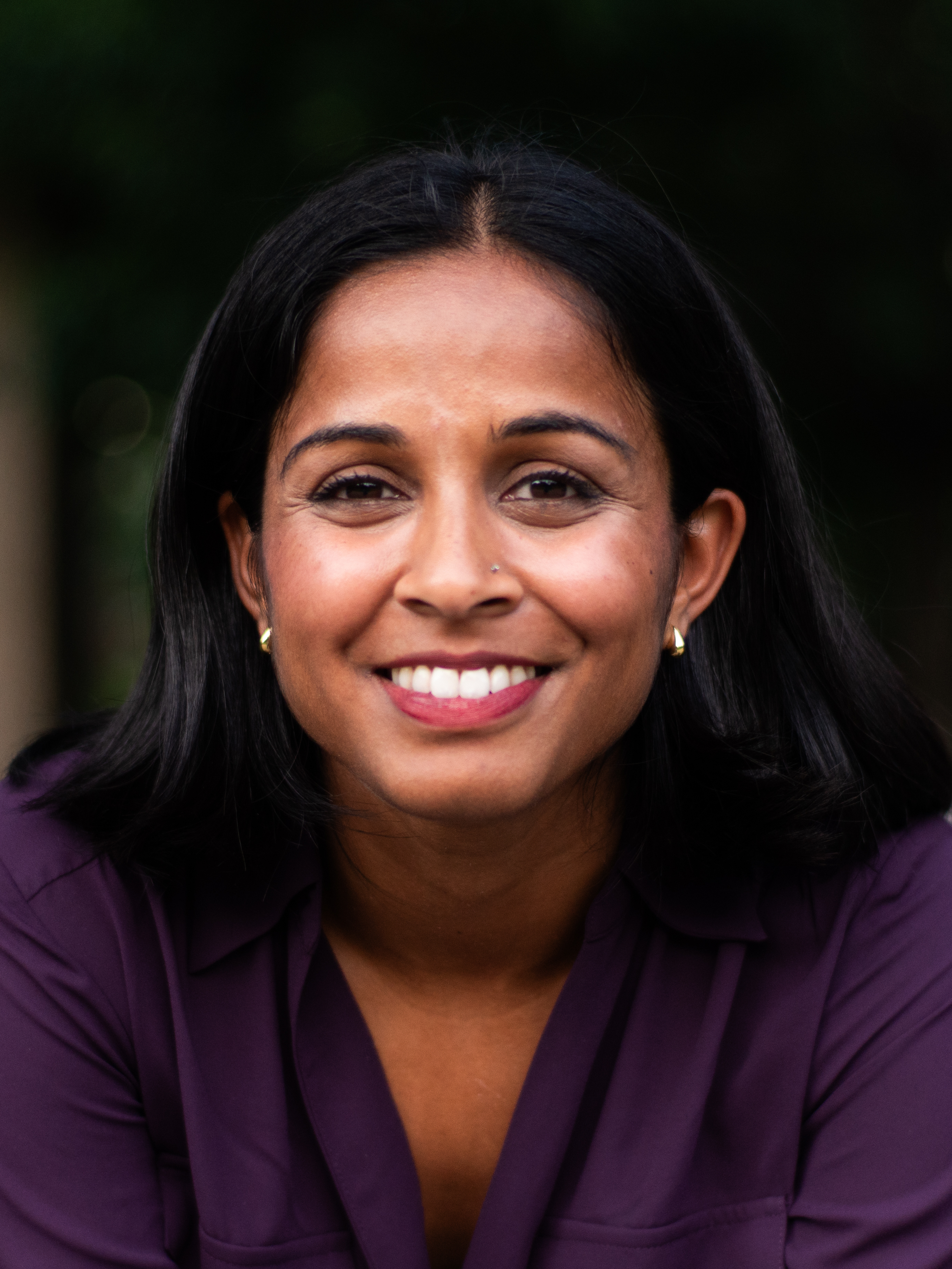

Nominee	Aparna Raj	Jett James Jasper	Jude Crannitch
Party	Democratic	Republican	DC Statehood Green
Councilmember before election
Brianne Nadeau
Democratic
Elected Councilmember
TBD

Incumbent Democrat Brianne Nadeau was re-elected to a third term in 2022 with 79.9% of the vote in the general election but only 48.5% of the vote in the 2022 Democratic primary election. She is not running for re-election.

=== Democratic primary ===
Candidates

- Rashida Brown, ANC member for district 1E
- Miguel Trindade Deramo, ANC member for district 1B
- Terry Lynch, community activist
- Aparna Raj, tenant organizer and former chair of the Metro DC Democratic Socialists of America
- Jackie Reyes-Yanes, former director of the Mayor's Office of Community Affairs

Withdrawn

- Brian Footer, ANC member for district 1E

Declined

- Ed Lazere, former director of the DC Fiscal Policy Institute and candidate for council chair in 2018
- Brianne Nadeau, incumbent councilmember (endorsed Brown)

Endorsements

Rashida Brown

Labor unions

- LiUNA Baltimore/Washington
- SEIU 32BJ (co-endorsement with Raj)

Local officials

- Ankit Jain, DC Shadow Senator (third choice)
- Brianne Nadeau, incumbent councilmember

Organizations

- Greater Greater Washington (second choice)
- Jews United for Justice (co-endorsement with Raj)
- Sierra Club District of Columbia (co-endorsement with Raj)
- Working Families Party (second choice)
Miguel Trindade Deramo

Local officials

- Ankit Jain, DC Shadow Senator (first choice)

Organizations

- Greater Greater Washington (third choice)
Aparna Raj

Labor unions

- Amalgamated Transit Union Local 689
- American Federation of Government Employees Local 2725 and Local 2978
- Communications Workers of America Maryland/DC Council
- Metropolitan Washington Council, AFL-CIO
- Nonprofit Professional Employees Union
- International Association of Fire Fighters local 36
- SEIU 32BJ (first choice)
- Service Employees International Union Local 500
- Teamsters Local 639
- UNITE HERE Local 23 and Local 25
- UFCW Local 400
- Washington Teachers Union Local 6

Local officials

- Ankit Jain, DC Shadow Senator (third choice)

Organizations

- Greater Greater Washington (first choice)
- Jews United for Justice (co-endorsement with Brown)
- Metro DC Democratic Socialists of America
- Our Revolution DC
- Sierra Club District of Columbia (co-endorsement with Brown)
- Run for Something
- Working Families Party

Fundraising

Campaign finance reports as of March 10, 2026
Candidate	Raised (revenue)	Spent (expenditures)	Cash on hand
Aparna Raj (D)	$306,474	$87,343	$219,131
Terry Lynch (D)	$61,462	$57,152	$4,310
Rashida Brown (D)	$127,801	$34,121	$95,679
Jackie Reyes-Yanes (D)	$130,906	$16,833	$114,298
Miguel Trinidade Deramo (D)	$84,308	$28,221	$56,087
Source: District of Columbia Office of Campaign Finance

Polling

Poll source	Date(s) administered	Sample size (Note: Key: A – all adults RV – registered voters LV – likely voters V – unclear)	Margin of error	Rashida Brown	Miguel Trindade Deramo	Terry Lynch	Aparna Raj	Jackie Reyes-Yanes	Undecided
Greater Greater Washington/PPP	March 27 – March 29, 2026	232 (LV)	± 6.4%	13%	7%	3%	18%	4%	54%

2026 Council of the District of Columbia Ward 1 Democratic primary
Party	Candidate	Round 1			Round 2			Round 3			Round 4	
Party	Candidate	Votes	%	Transfer	Votes	%	Transfer	Votes	%	Transfer	Votes	%
Democratic	Aparna Raj	9,203	47.37	+ 1	9,204	47.42	+ 156	9,360	48.87	+ 369	9,729	52.30
Democratic	Miguel Trindade Deramo	4,147	21.35	+ 1	4,148	21.37	+ 229	4,377	22.86	+ 590	4,967	26.70
Democratic	Rashida Brown	3,268	16.82	+ 3	3,271	16.85	+ 169	3,440	17.96	+ 466	3,906	21.00
Democratic	Jackie Reyes-Yanes	1,739	8.95	+ 3	1,742	8.97	+ 232	1,974	10.31	1,974	Eliminated	
Democratic	Terry Lynch	1,045	5.38	+ 1	1,046	5.39	1,046	Eliminated				
Write-in		25	0.13	25	Eliminated							
Continuing ballots		20,001	100.00		19,985	99.92		19,725	98.62		19,176	95.88
Exhausted ballots		–		+ 16	16	0.08	+ 260	276	1.38	+ 549	825	4.12
Total votes		20,001	100.00		20,001	100.00		20,001	100.00		20,001	100.00

=== Republican primary ===
Candidates

- Jett James Jasper

2026 Council of the District of Columbia Ward 1 Republican primary
Party	Candidate	Votes	%
Republican	Jett James Jasper	169	82.44
Write-in		36	17.56
Total votes		205	100.00

=== Statehood Green primary ===
Candidates

- Jude Crannitch

2026 Council of the District of Columbia Ward 1 Statehood Green primary
Party	Candidate	Votes	%
DC Statehood Green	Jude Crannitch	76	58.91
Write-in		53	41.09
Total votes		129	100.00

=== Independents ===
Candidates

- Ryan Prince

== Ward 3 ==
2026 Council of the District of Columbia Ward 3 Election
- November 3, 2026
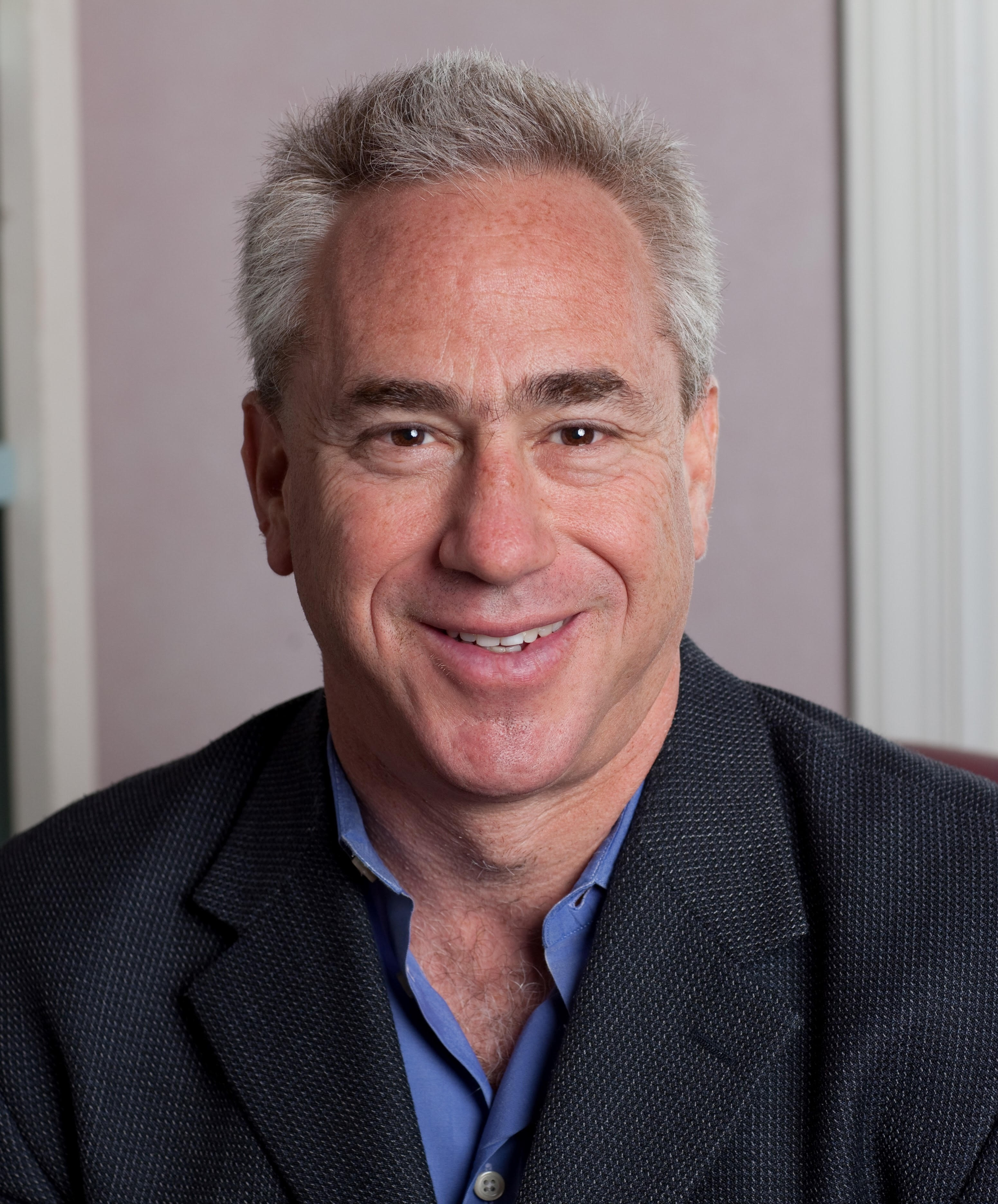

Nominee	Matt Frumin	Write-in
Party	Democratic
Councilmember before election
Matt Frumin
Democratic
Elected Councilmember
TBD

Incumbent Democrat Matt Frumin was first elected in 2022 with 75.9% of the vote.

=== Democratic primary ===
Candidates

- Matt Frumin, incumbent councilmember

Withdrawn

- Adam Prinzo, ANC member for district 3C

Declined

- Henry Cohen, candidate for Ward 3 councilmember in 2022
- Eric Goulet, State Board of Education member and candidate in 2022 (running at-large)

Endorsements

Matt Frumin

Labor unions

- Amalgamated Transit Union Local 689
- International Association of Fire Fighters local 36
- United Food and Commercial Workers local 400

Organizations

- Capital Stonewall Democrats
- DC Association of REALTORS
- Sierra Club

2026 Council of the District of Columbia Ward 3 Democratic primary
Party	Candidate	Votes	%
Democratic	Matt Frumin (incumbent)	16,123	96.05
Write-in		663	3.95
Total votes		16,786	100.00

=== Republican primary ===
2026 Council of the District of Columbia Ward 3 Republican primary
Party	Candidate	Votes	%
	Write-in	133	100.00
Total votes		133	100.00

=== Statehood Green primary ===
2026 Council of the District of Columbia Ward 3 Statehood Green primary
Party	Candidate	Votes	%
	Write-in	32	100.00
Total votes		32	100.00

== Ward 5 ==
2026 Council of the District of Columbia Ward 5 Election
- November 3, 2026
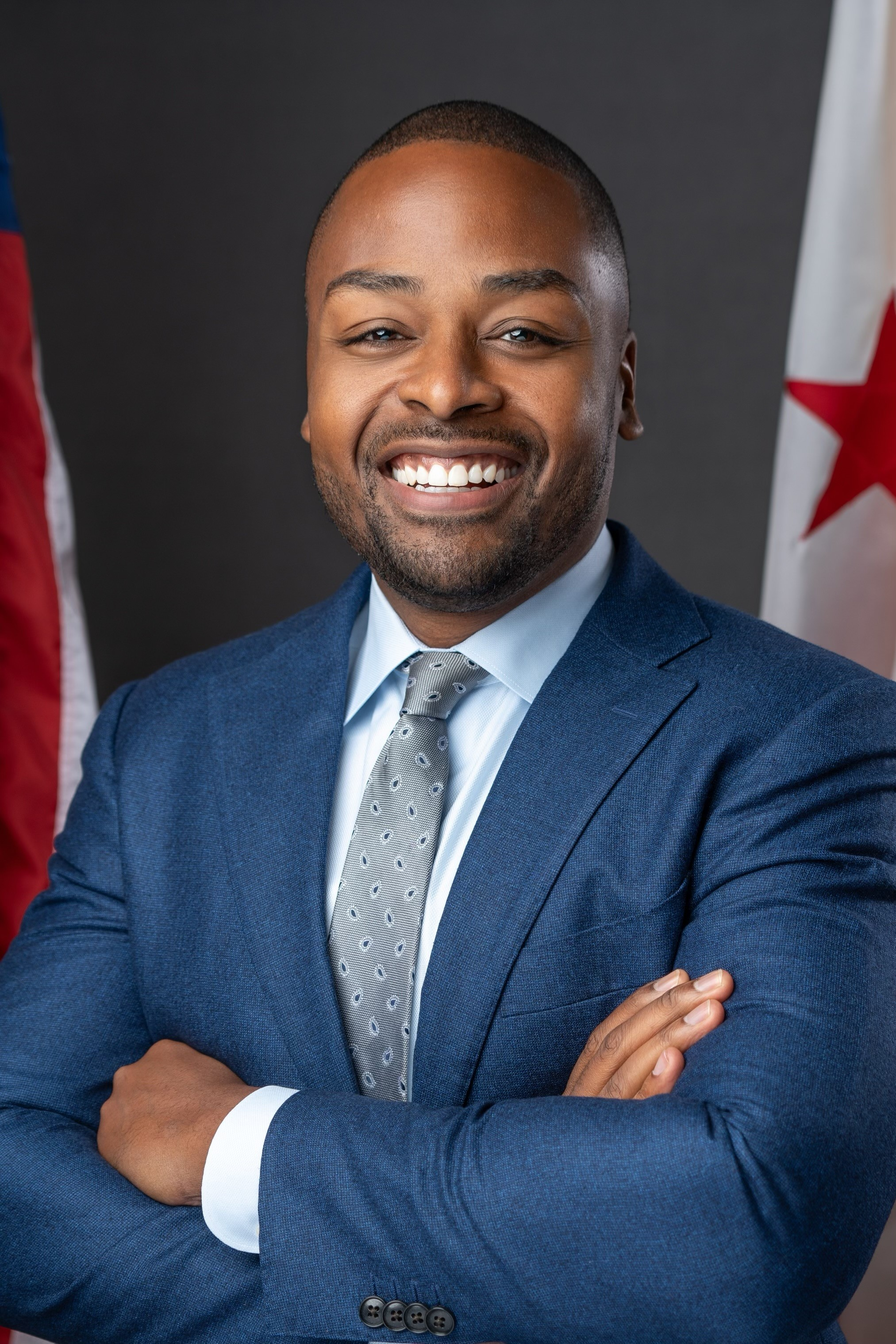

Nominee	Zachary Parker	Jeffrey Kihien-Palza	Joyce Robinson-Paul
Party	Democratic	Republican	DC Statehood Green
Councilmember before election
Zachary Parker
Democratic
Elected Councilmember
TBD

Incumbent Democrat Zachary Parker was first elected in 2022 with 93.9% of the vote, and was facing two primary challengers, who easily defeated them.

=== Democratic primary ===
Candidates

- Bernita Carmichael, risk management professional
- Bridget French, former United States Department of Energy consultant
- Zachary Parker, incumbent councilmember

Endorsements

Zachary Parker

Labor unions

- Amalgamated Transit Union Local 689
- International Association of Fire Fighters local 36
- United Food and Commercial Workers local 400

Organizations

- Capital Stonewall Democrats
- DC Association of REALTORS
- Greater Greater Washington
- Jews United for Justice
- Sierra Club
- Working Families Party

2026 Council of the District of Columbia Ward 5 Democratic primary
Party	Candidate	Votes	%
Democratic	Zachary Parker (incumbent)	14,822	77.57
Democratic	Bernita Carmichael	2,723	14.25
Democratic	Bridget French	1,403	7.34
Write-in		161	0.84
Total votes		19,109	100.00

=== Republican primary ===
Candidates

- Jeffrey Kihien-Palza, businessman

2026 Council of the District of Columbia Ward 5 Republican primary
Party	Candidate	Votes	%
Republican	Jeffrey Kihien-Palza	228	90.48
Write-in		24	9.52
Total votes		252	100.00

=== Statehood Green primary ===
Candidates

- Joyce Robinson-Paul

2026 Council of the District of Columbia Ward 5 Statehood Green primary
Party	Candidate	Votes	%
DC Statehood Green	Joyce Robinson-Paul	94	78.33
Write-in		26	21.67
Total votes		120	100.00

== Ward 6 ==
2026 Council of the District of Columbia Ward 6 Election
- November 3, 2026
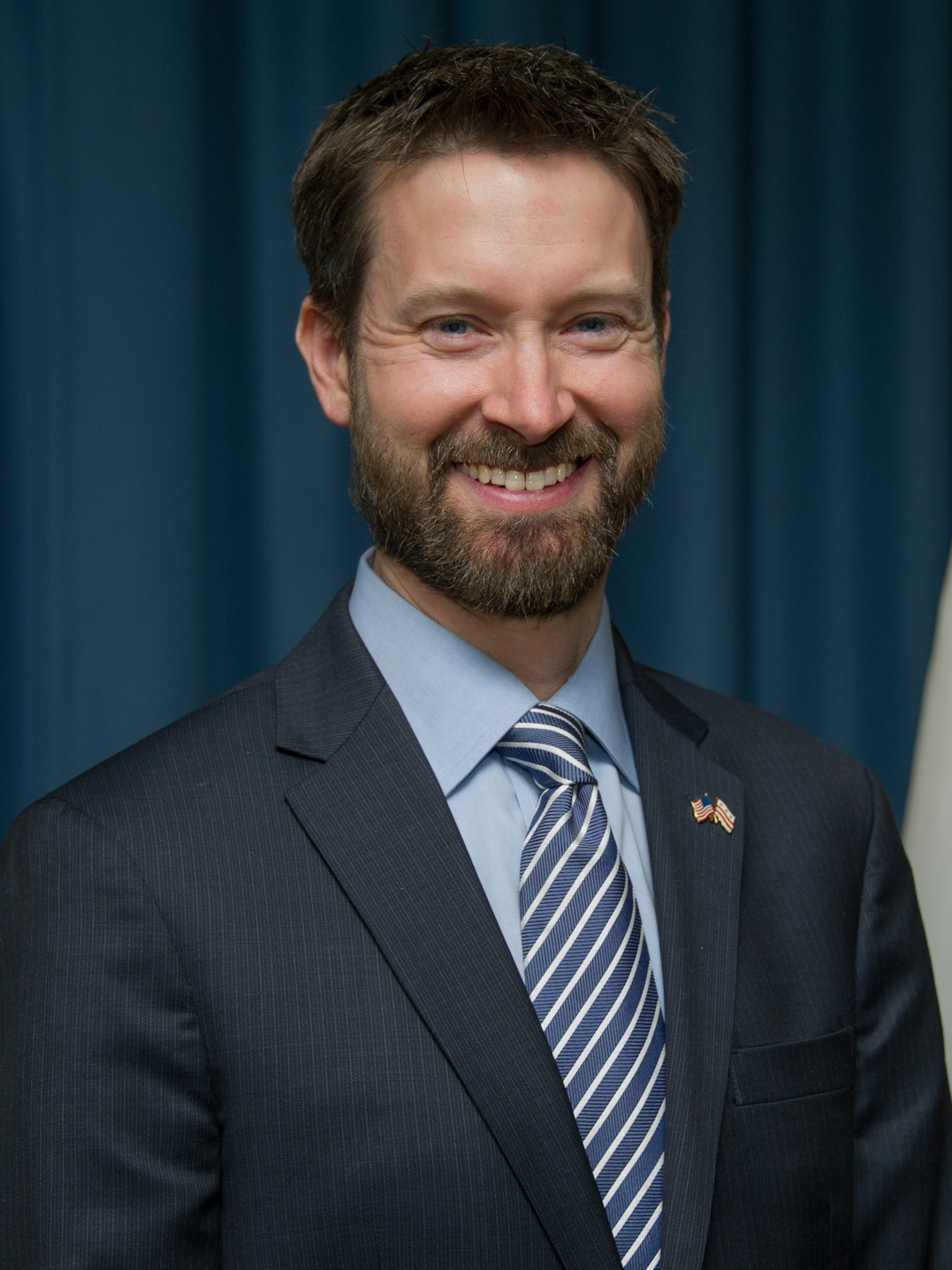

Nominee	Charles Allen	Jorge Rice
Party	Democratic	Republican
Councilmember before election
Charles Allen
Democratic
Elected Councilmember
TBD

Incumbent Democrat Charles Allen was re-elected unopposed in 2022, and a recall effort in 2024 failed to make the ballot.

=== Democratic primary ===
Candidates

- Charles Allen, incumbent councilmember
- Michael Murphy, attorney
- Gloria Ann Nauden, business executive and marketing strategist

Endorsements

Charles Allen

Labor unions

- Amalgamated Transit Union Local 689
- International Association of Fire Fighters local 36
- LiUNA! Philadelphia/Baltimore/Washington Laborers' District Council
- UNITE HERE Local 25
- United Food and Commercial Workers local 400
- Washington Teachers' Union

Organizations

- Capital Stonewall Democrats
- DC Association of REALTORS
- Greater Greater Washington
- Jews United for Justice
- Sierra Club
- Working Families Party

2026 Council of the District of Columbia Ward 6 Democratic primary
Party	Candidate	Votes	%
Democratic	Charles Allen (incumbent)	14,787	75.74
Democratic	Gloria Ann Nauden	3,487	17.86
Democratic	Michael Murphy	1,178	6.03
Write-in		71	0.36
Total votes		19,150	100.00

=== Republican primary ===
Candidates

- Jorge Rice, lawyer

2026 Council of the District of Columbia Ward 6 Republican primary
Party	Candidate	Votes	%
Republican	Jorge Rice	658	91.90
Write-in		58	8.10
Total votes		716	100.00

=== Statehood Green primary ===
2026 Council of the District of Columbia Ward 6 Statehood Green primary
Party	Candidate	Votes	%
	Write-in	55	100.00
Total votes		55	100.00

=== Fundraising ===
Campaign finance reports as of January 31, 2026
Candidate	Raised	Spent	Cash on hand
Charles Allen (D)	$134,216	$25,653	$130,522
Gloria Nauden (D)	$66,444	$13,840	$62,201
Jorge Rice (R)	$1,150.50	$283.75	$866.25
Source: District of Columbia Office of Campaign Finance

DC OCF Public Campaign Financing
Candidate	Office Sought	Certification Status	Base Amount Cap	Base Amount Payout	Payment Cap	Payouts	Payouts Total
Charles Allen (D)	Council Ward 6	Certified	$40,000.00	$20,000.00	$263,680.00	$183,470.00	$203,470.00
Gloria Nauden (D)	Council Ward 6	Certified	$40,000.00	$20,000.00	$263,680.00	$78,748.75	$98,748.75
Jorge Rice (R)	Council Ward 6	Threshold Not Met	$40,000.00	$0.00	$268,680.00	$0.00	$0.00
Source: District of Columbia Office of Campaign Finance
