= Metro DC Democratic Socialists of America =

Washington area chapter of the US political organization

- Abbreviation: MDC DSA or Metro DC DSA
- Governing body: Steering Committee
- Headquarters: 1301 Connecticut Ave NW, Washington, DC
- Newspaper: Washington Socialist
- Membership (June 2026): ▲3,763
- Ideology: Democratic socialism; Socialism (multi-tendency)
- Political position: Left-wing
- National affiliation: Democratic Socialists of America
- DC Council: 2 / 13 (Note: DSA does not have a ballot line of its own. DSA runs candidates on the ballot lines of other political parties. The vast majority of DSA members in elected office ran on the Democratic Party ballot line.)
- DC citywide executive offices: 0 / 2
- DC shadow representative: 1 / 1 (Note: Owolewa is an MDC DSA member but not an MDC DSA endorsee.)
- DC shadow senators: 0 / 2
- DC nonvoting delegate to the U.S. House: 0 / 1

Website
- mdcdsa.org

The Metro DC Democratic Socialists of America (MDC DSA or Metro DC DSA) is the Washington metropolitan area chapter of the Democratic Socialists of America (DSA). MDC DSA organizes in Washington, D.C., southern Maryland, and Northern Virginia. MDC is the 3rd-largest DSA chapter, below DSA-LA and above Portland DSA. The chapter's logo is presumably derived from the cover art of Bad Brains' 1982 eponymous album.

MDC DSA has been active in local electoral campaigns, tenant organizing, labor solidarity efforts, and protest mobilizations.

Notable MDC DSA members include Hilda Mason, Janeese Lewis George, Zachary Parker, Oye Owolewa, Marc Elrich, and Ashik Siddique.

== Structure ==
MDC DSA maintains branches in Northern Virginia (NOVA), the District of Columbia (DC), Montgomery County (MoCo), and Prince George's County (PG).

MDC DSA holds a local convention each year at which members set chapter priorities, endorse candidates, and elect the Steering Committee.

From 2009 to 2015, MDC DSA had about 200 members. In 2016, MDC DSA had 200 members. In October 2017, MDC DSA had 1,000 members. In 2019, MDC DSA had 2,000 members.

== History ==
In 1982, the Democratic Socialists of America (DSA) formed as a merger of the Democratic Socialist Organizing Committee and the New American Movement. DSA had two Washington area chapters: A larger DC/MD chapter and a smaller Northern Virginia (NOVA) chapter, divided by the Potomac River. In 1985, these chapters "affiliated" together. In 1988, they formally merged into the DC/MD/NOVA chapter. The 1993 DSA National Convention endorsed the statehood for DC.

MDC DSA shrank from 2000 to 2006, becoming fully inactive in 2007. Around 2009, local members restarted the chapter and formally renamed it into Metro DC DSA. In 2016 and 2017, MDC DSA grew dramatically, alongside national DSA, after Bernie Sanders' first presidential campaign and the election of Donald Trump.

As MDC DSA and the broader progressive movement grew, they displaced centrist forces in DC politics, such as the Washington Post. In 2018, Washingtonian writer Adia Robinson wrote that Washington is "listening more closely to the Washington Teacher's Union or DSA" than "to the Post's editorial board".

== Electoral campaigns ==
Unlike most political parties, Metro DC DSA does not have a ballot line. Instead, MDC DSA acts "like a party" or a "party surrogate" by endorsing, pamphleteering, and canvassing for candidates it supports. MDC DSA has endorsed and run candidates in local, state, and federal elections.

=== National elected office ===
Many DSA and DC/MD DSA members participated in the April 17-19, 1986 founding convention of the National Rainbow Coalition, held at the Washington Convention Center. IAM President and DSA National Vice-Chair William Winpisinger wrote the introduction Jackson's keynote speech. The DC/MD chapter hosted the 1987 DSA National Convention in the First Congregational United Church of Christ, where members voted to endorse Jesse Jackson for president. Jackson, hoping to win over moderates, requested DSA un-endorse him.

In 2014, MDC DSA supported DSA's "We Need Bernie Committee" campaign to encourage Bernie Sanders to run in the 2016 Democratic Party presidential primaries rather than as an independent. Metro DC DSA's rally was hosted by Barbara Ehrenreich, former Texas Department of Agriculture commissioner Jim Hightower, former CWA President Larry Cohen, and Busboys and Poets owner Andy Shallal.

In 2021, MDC DSA did not endorse Oye Owolewa, a MDC DSA member, in his run for District of Columbia shadow representative, in order to focus on other races. Owolewa had won the 2020 Shadow Representative election Democratic primary with 74,101 votes (95.8%) and won the general. In 2022, Owolewa won the primary with 51.6% and won the general. In 2024, Owolewa won the primary with 57.7% and won the general. In 2026, Owolwewa declined to run in order to join the 2026 DC Council election.

=== Elected offices in DC ===
From 1977 to 1999, MDC DSA member and endorsee Hilda Mason held an at-large seat on the DC Council. Mason, who ran on the Statehood Party ballot line, became the longest-serving elected official in the district's history since home rule. Mason, a Civil Rights Movement veteran, said to Washington Socialist: "What is a civil right if you don’t have food and shelter and health care? [....] [I]f we really want freedom, we have to build an economically equal system."

In the 2010 DC Mayoral election, MDC DSA narrowly voted to endorse Vincent C. Gray as the best option in the Democratic primary. Gray won the Democratic primary and the general.

In the 2012 Shadow Representative election, MDC DSA endorsed incumbent Eleanor Holmes Norton and in the DC Council election, MDC DSA endorsed Phil Mendelson for Council Chair. Neither were socialists or DSA members. Both won their Democratic primary and the general.

In the 2014 DC Mayoral election, candidate Muriel Bowser called candidate Andy Shallal "a rich socialist", because Shallal owns Busboys and Poets and was running on a strongly progressive platform, including a minimum wage hike. Mayor Vincent C. Gray responded that Bowser's comment was "a page out of the Tea Party's playbook". MDC DSA was delighted and endorsed Shallal in the Democratic primary. Shallal lost with 3,196 votes (3.3%).

In the 2014 DC Council election, MDC DSA endorsed Reverend Graylan Scott Hagler as an independent and Eugene Puryear as a Statehood Green for the two At-Large seats. In the Shadow Representative election, MDC DSA endorsed Joyce Robinson-Paul as a Statehood Green. Hagler lost in 7th with 10,539 votes (3.9%), Puryear lost in 6th with 12,525 votes (4.6%), and Robinson-Paul lost in 2nd with 19,982 votes (13.6%).

In 2018, MDC DSA ran 11 candidates for the Advisory Neighborhood Commission (ANC) positions. Ashik Siddique ran for district 4C03 as part of an 11-candidate MDC DSA ANC slate. but lost to an incumbent. Siddique is now a Co-Chair of national DSA.

In the 2020 DC Council election, MDC DSA supported a progressive slate. MDC DSA supported Janeese Lewis George in the Ward 4 Democratic primary against incumbent Brandon Todd, a moderate and close ally of Mayor Muriel Bowser, and supported Ed Lazere for an at-large seat as an independent. During the campaign, the centrist group Democrats for Education Reform sent mailers attacking Janeese as anti-police, which a DFER founder later said was "wrong". In a major upset, Janeese won the primary with 10,965 votes (54.8%) and won the general. Lazere lost the top-two general with 61,882 votes (11.5%) in 4th place. Janeese was first self-described democratic socialist to serve as a Council member since Hilda Mason lost re-election in 1998. In 2021, Janeese proposed a social housing model of both publicly owned and subsidized mixed-income housing. In April 2022, Lewis George introduced two bills inspired by the Green New Deal, first to create an agency to construct and maintain mixed-income social housing, and second to accelerate the removal of lead pipes. In 2024, business-backed political committee Opportunity DC again attacked George as anti-police. Janeese won 66.2% in the primary and won the general.

In the 2022 DC Council election, MDC DSA endorsed Zachary Parker in the open Ward 5 Democratic primary. Parker won the primary with 7,761 votes (43.5%) and the general with 25,554 votes (93.9%). In 2023, MDC DSA censured Parker over his support for the "Secure DC" crime bill, after he supported parts of an earlier crime bill that would roll back police-accountability measures opposed by Lewis George and other councilmembers.

On December 1, 2025, Lewis George announced her candidacy for mayor of the District of Columbia in the 2026 election. On June 11, Trump called Lewis George a "crazy socialist" and threatened to revoke Home Rule in DC, saying "maybe we take back Washington, run it on the federal basis". On election day, Lewis George, Raj, and Oye opened up huge leads over their opponents. Speaking to The Hill, MDC DSA chair Kurtis Hagans said Lewis George and Raj's election shows "momentum for a new kind of politics in the DMV" and that DSA electeds would demonstrate good governance via "sewer socialism".

=== Elected offices in MD ===
In the 2016 US Senate race, MDC DSA endorsed endorsed Donna Edwards. In the US House race, MDC DSA endorsed Jamie Raskin for District 8 and Joseline Peña-Melnyk for District 4. All were progressives and none were socialists or DSA members. In the Democratic primaries, Edwards lost in 2nd with 343,620 votes (38.9%), Pena lost in 3rd with 21,724 votes (19.0%), and Raskin won with 43,776 votes (33.6%). Raskin won the general election.

In the 2018 Maryland House of Delegates election, MDC DSA endorsed Gabriel Acevero in District 39 and Vaughn Stewart in District 19. In the top-3 Democratic primary elections, Acevero won 5,116 votes (20.1%) in 1st; Stewart won 6,363 votes (16.8%) in 3rd. Both won their top-3 general elections. Acevero was the first openly gay Afro-Latino elected to the Maryland House of Delegates. Stewart has proposed social housing and tenant protections in the House. In the 2022 top-3 Democratic primaries, Acevero won 7,480 votes (27.9%) in 2nd place; Stewart won 11,815 votes (29.5%) in 3rd. Both won their top-3 general elections.

In the 2018 election for Montgomery County Executive, MDC DSA endorsed Marc Elrich. Elrich has been a DSA member since the 1980s and is often attacked as a "socialist", but personally supports "blending aspects of both" capitalism and socialism. Elrich won the Democratic primary with 37,532 votes (29.0%), just 80 votes ahead of 2nd place David Blair, and won the general. In the 2022 elections, Elrich won the Democratic primary with 55,504 votes (39.2%), just 30 votes ahead of 2nd place David Blair, and won the general.

In 2022, MDC DSA endorsed Kristin Mink for the District 5 seat on the Montgomery County Council. Mink won her primary and general election. MDC DSA also endorsed Brandy Brooks for an at-large seat on the Montgomery County Council. After a campaign staffer accused Brooks of sexual harassment, the Brooks campaign ended and MDC DSA rescinded its endorsement. The endorsement dispute became part of broader tensions in Montgomery County's progressive coalition during the 2022 at-large race.

In 2024, following a MDC DSA tenant organizing campaign in Rockville, Councilmember Zola Shaw joined DSA.

In 2025, MDC DSA endorsed Shayla Adams-Stafford for the Prince George's County Council District 5 Democratic primary, a special election. Adams-Stafford won the primary election with 49.6% and won the general election.

In 2025, MDC DSA endorsed Frankie Fritz for the Greenbelt City Council. Fritz had been a chair of the MoCo-PG Branch of MDC DSA and a senior aide to Mink's election campaign. MDC DSA organized 122 volunteers to knock 17454 doors. Fritz won in the top-7 general with 2,052 votes (11.3%) for 5th place. Fritz was the first challenger to defeat any incumbent Greenbelt City Council members since 1985.

=== Elected offices in VA ===
In 2017, Metro DC DSA canvassed for Lee Carter's campaign for the Virginia House of Delegates, sending 15 to 25 members to Manassas on weekends and averaging about 1,500 doors per weekend.

=== Ballot measure ===
In 2022, MDC DSA endorsed and organized for Initiative 82, a District ballot measure to phase out the tipped minimum wage. District voters approved the initiative with 73.9% in favor.

== Other campaigns ==
=== Labor organizing ===
MDC DSA's labor activity has included solidarity actions with labor union campaigns in the Washington region. In 2022, MDC DSA organized a solidarity rally for Starbucks Workers United in Arlington during a national strike day.

Washington Teachers' Union negotiator Dieter Lehmann Morales previously cut his teeth organizing with MDC DSA.

=== Tenant organizing ===
Metro DC DSA's tenant campaign is called Stomp Out Slumlords (SOS). The campaign began in 2017, when members started canvassing tenants facing eviction and encouraging them to attend court. In 2018, the campaign sent 10 to 20 volunteer canvassers to knock on roughly 200 doors each weekend, and chapter organizers reported that tenants directly contacted by SOS were nearly twice as likely to appear in court. The campaign has organized in apartment complexes including Southern Towers and Marbury Plaza. During the COVID-19 pandemic, SOS organized tenants to attempt rent-strike mobilizations for rent cancellation, emergency assistance, and a temporary rent freeze. In 2020, SOS and the DC Tenants Union organized an eviction blockade in Chillum and rent-cancellation protests connected to rent strikes at Southern Towers and Meridian Heights. In 2021, SOS and other housing activists protested outside the home of White House domestic policy adviser Susan Rice to demand a federal eviction-moratorium extension. SOS supported the District's temporary 2022 rent-freeze legislation. In 2025, SOS participated in anti-displacement protests linked to redevelopment plans at the Bradley Lane site and debates over changes to D.C.'s housing policy agenda.

=== Issue campaigns ===
In June 2018, MDC DSA members confronted Homeland Security Secretary Kirstjen Nielsen at a Washington restaurant during protests over Trump administration family separation policy. Protesters chanted "abolish ICE", "shame", and "If kids don't eat in peace, you don't eat in peace". Other diners applauded the protesters. Conservative blog Hot Air called the protest "thinly disguised terrorism". Margaret McLaughlin, an MDC DSA Steering Committee member, told the Washington Examiner that the message was: "Stop ripping apart families". Nielsen did not respond. After protesters left the restaurant, the Secret Service detained several, but made no arrests. Washingtonian argued that this protest normalized interruptions of elite DC officials in restaurants, such as the 2022 protest of Brett Kavanaugh by ShutDownDC in Morton's after the anti-abortion Dobbs decision.

In September 2018, Project Veritas claimed that it found "deep state resistance" from a DSA member employed at the Department of State, who said that he waits "until after 5:30" to send DSA messages. James O'Keefe described him as the "hidden face of the resistance inside the executive branch of our government".

In 2019, MDC DSA supported ShutDownDC street blockades in favor of climate change.

In April 2025, MDC DSA members participated in downtown street blockages organized with other groups to mark the first 100 days of Donald Trump's second administration. MDC DSA also joined the Free DC marches to oppose Trump's deployment of the National Guard to DC.

In 2025, Metro DC DSA supported the We Power DC's utility-affordability advocacy, which supports public ownership of DC's electric utility distribution system. We Power DC has opposed repeated Pepco rate increases and supported Office of the People's Counsel litigation challenging the Public Service Commission's multiyear rate-plan approvals.

== Election results ==
=== Federal ===
Year	Name	Office	District	Stage	Votes	%	Result	DSA	Notes	Ref
2024	Oye Owolewa	DC shadow representative	At-large	General	267,661	90.75%	Won	member		
2024	Oye Owolewa	DC shadow representative	At-large	Dem primary	46,582	57.7%	Won	member		
2022	Oye Owolewa	DC shadow representative	At-large	General	140,502	83.5%	Won	member		
2022	Oye Owolewa	DC shadow representative	At-large	Dem primary	54,317	51.6%	Won	member		
2020	Oye Owolewa	DC shadow representative	At-large	General	240,533	81.60%	Won	member		
2020	Mckayla Wilkes	U.S. House	MD-05	Dem primary	40,105	26.72%	Lost	member, endorsee		
2020	Oye Owolewa	DC shadow representative	At-large	Dem primary	74,101	95.8%	Won	member		
2014	Joyce Robinson-Paul	DC shadow representative	At-large	General	19,982	13.6%	Lost	endorsee		

=== Statewide ===
Year	Name	Office	State	District	Stage	Votes	%	Result	DSA	Notes	Ref
2026	Janeese Lewis George	DC	Mayor	At-large	General	TBD	TBD	TBD	member, endorsee		
2026	Janeese Lewis George	DC	Mayor	At-large	Dem primary	76,276	54.13%	Won	member, endorsee		
2020	Mysiki Valentine	DC	State Board of Education	At-large	General	50,610	19.4%	Lost	endorsee		
2018	Emily Gasoi	DC	State Board of Education	Ward 1	General	14,597	53.2%	Won	endorsee		
2014	Andy Shallal	DC	Mayor	At-Large	Dem primary	3,196	3.3%	Lost	endorsee		

=== State legislature ===
Year	Name	State	Office	District	Stage	Votes	%	Result	DSA	Notes	Ref
2026	Gabriel Acevero	MD	House	District 39	General	TBD	TBD	TBD	member, endorsee		
2026	Oye Owolewa	DC	Council	At-Large	General	TBD	TBD	TBD	member		
2026	Aparna Raj	DC	Council	Ward 1	General	TBD	TBD	TBD	member, endorsee		
2026	Gabriel Acevero	MD	House	District 39	Dem primary	6,589	24.1%	Won	member, endorsee		
2026	Raaheela Ahmed	MD	Senate	District 23	Dem primary	10,341	44.3%	Lost	endorsee		
2026	Oye Owolewa	DC	Council	At-Large	Dem primary	59,189	50.93%	Won	member		
2026	Aparna Raj	DC	Council	Ward 1	Dem primary	9,729	52.3%	Won	member, endorsee		
2024	Janeese Lewis George	DC	Council	Ward 4	General	36,319	96.6%	Won	member, endorsee		
2024	Janeese Lewis George	DC	Council	Ward 4	Dem primary	10,683	66.2%	Won	member, endorsee		
2022	Zachary Parker	DC	Council	Ward 5	General	25,554	93.9%	Won	member, endorsee (Note: Zachary Parker was later censured in 2023, rescinding his endorsement.)		
2022	Zachary Parker	DC	Council	Ward 5	Dem primary	7,761	43.5%	Won	member, endorsee	open seat	
2022	Gabriel Acevero	MD	House	District 39	General	23,104	33.0%	Won	member, endorsee	top-3 general; 1st place	
2022	Vaughn Stewart	MD	House	District 19	General	27,032	29.0%	Won	member, endorsee	top-3 general; 3rd place	
2022	Vaughn Stewart	MD	House	District 19	Dem primary	11,815	29.5%	Won	member, endorsee	top-3 primary; 3rd place	
2022	Gabriel Acevero	MD	House	District 39	Dem primary	7,480	27.9%	Won	member, endorsee	top-3 primary; 2nd place	
2022	Max Socol	MD	Senate	District 18	Dem primary	6,883	36.23%	Lost	endorsee		
2021	Karishma Mehta	VA	House	District 49	Dem primary	2,065	29.5%	Lost	endorsee		
2020	Ed Lazere	DC	Council	At-large	General	61,882	11.5%	Lost	endorsee	top-two general; 4th place	
2020	Janeese Lewis George	DC	Council	Ward 4	General	38,990	91.8%	Won	member, endorsee		
2020	Janeese Lewis George	DC	Council	Ward 4	Dem primary	10,965	54.8%	Won	member, endorsee	defeated incumbent Brandon Todd	
2019	Yasmine Taeb	VA	Senate	District 35	Dem primary	6,945	45.8%	Lost	endorsee		
2018	Jeremiah Lowery	DC	Council	At-large	Dem primary	17,688	23.8%	Lost	member, endorsee		
2018	Gabriel Acevero	MD	House	District 39	General	28,554	31.0%	Won	member, endorsee	top-3 general; 1st place	
2018	Vaughn Stewart	MD	House	District 19	General	32,636	24.3%	Won	member, endorsee	top-3 general; 3rd place	
2018	Vaughn Stewart	MD	House	District 19	Dem primary	6,363	16.8%	Won	member, endorsee	top-3 primary; 3rd place	
2018	Gabriel Acevero	MD	House	District 39	Dem primary	5,116	20.1%	Won	member, endorsee	top-3 primary; 1st place	
2014	Eugene Puryear	DC	Council	At-large	General	12,525	4.6%	Lost	endorsee	top-two general; 6th place	
2014	Graylan Scott Hagler	DC	Council	At-large	General	10,539	3.9%	Lost	endorsee	top-two general; 7th place	

=== Local legislature ===
Year	Name	Area	Office	District	Stage	Votes	%	Result	DSA	Notes	Ref
2026	Izola Shaw	MoCo	Council	3	Dem primary	7,274	43.89%	Lost	member, endorsee		
2026	Josie Caballero	MoCo	Council	At-Large	Dem primary	41,813	9.23%	Lost	member, endorsee	at-large; 6th place	
2026	Shayla Adams-Stafford	PG County	Council	5	Dem primary	9,773	87.03%	Won	member, endorsee		
2026	Imara Crooms	PG County	Council	District 9	Dem primary	3,748	17.42%	Lost	member, endorsee		
2025	Frankie Fritz	Greenbelt	Council	At-Large	General	2,052	11.3%	Won	member, endorsee	at-large; 5th place	
2025	Shayla Adams-Stafford	PG County	Council	5	General	8,091	92.6%	Won	endorsee	special election	
2025	Shayla Adams-Stafford	PG County	Council	5	Dem primary	5,126	49.6%	Won	endorsee	special election	
2022	Kristin Mink	MoCo	Council	5	General	34,085	81.3%	Won	member, endorsee		
2022	Kristin Mink	MoCo	Council	5	Dem primary	8,075	42.1%	Won	member, endorsee		
2022	Brandy Brooks	MoCo	Council	At-Large	Dem primary	0	0%	Lost	unendorsed (Note: In 2022, MDC DSA endorsed Brandy Brooks, then rescinded her endorsement.)	withdrew from campaign	
2022	Marc Elrich	MoCo	County Executive	At-Large	General	251,897	75.1%	Won	member, endorsee		
2022	Marc Elrich	MoCo	County Executive	At-Large	Dem primary	55,504	39.2%	Won	member, endorsee	won by 30 votes	
2019	Irma Corado	Fairfax County	Board	Braddock District	Dem primary	3,128	32.8%	Lost	endorsee		
2018	Marc Elrich	MoCo	County Executive	At-Large	General	259,901	64.7%	Won	member, endorsee		
2018	Marc Elrich	MoCo	County Executive	At-Large	Dem primary	37,532	29.0%	Won	member, endorsee	won by 80 votes	
2018	Brandy Brooks	MoCo	Council	At-Large	Dem primary	26,214	5.9%	Lost	endorsee	top-4 primary, 6th place	
2018	Danielle Meitiv	MoCo	Council	At-Large	Dem primary	14,808	3.3%	Lost	endorsee	top-4 primary, 11th place	
2018	Chris Wilhelm	MoCo	Council	At-Large	Dem primary	26,453	5.9%	Lost	endorsee	top-4 primary, 7th place	

MDC DSA has also endorsed many Advisory Neighborhood Commission (ANC) races.

== See also ==
- List of chapters of the Democratic Socialists of America
- List of Democratic Socialists of America public officeholders
- Socialism in the United States and American Left
