= Aparna Raj =

American politician (born 1993)

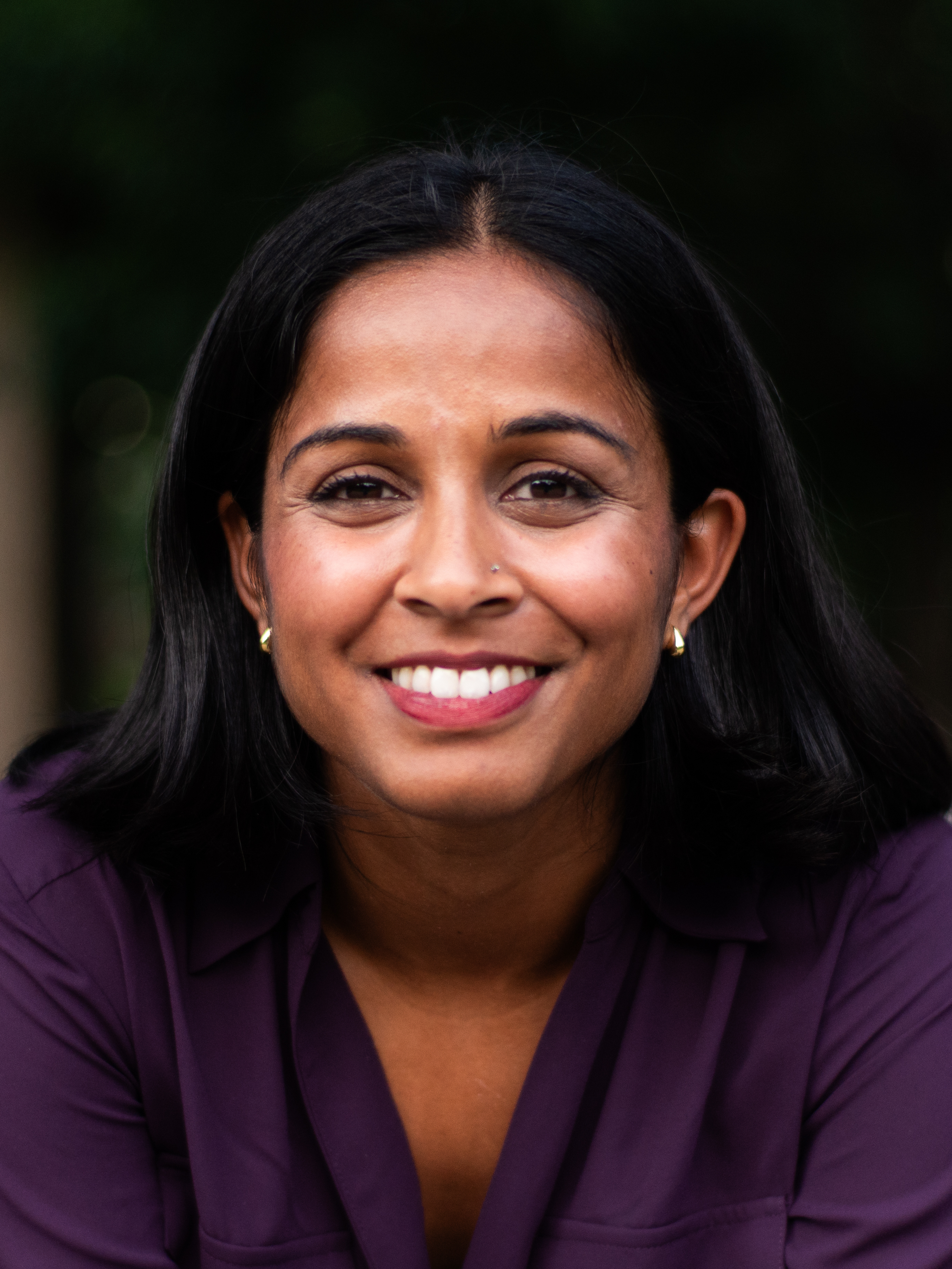
- Raj in 2025

Member-elect of the Council of the District of Columbia from the 1st ward
- Assuming office January 2, 2027
- Succeeding: Brianne Nadeau

Personal details
- Born: November 19, 1993 (age 32) West Chester, Pennsylvania, U.S.
- Party: Democratic
- Other political affiliations: Democratic Socialists of America (Note: The Democratic Socialists of America (DSA) are not a registered political party. Instead, they are a political organization for those with democratic socialist ideologies. Raj is a member of and is endorsed by the Metro DC DSA chapter.)
- Education: Vanderbilt University (BA)

Aparna Raj (born November 19, 1993) is an American organizer and politician who is the councilmember-elect for the Council of the District of Columbia from Ward 1. A Democrat and democratic socialist, Raj is a member and former chair of the Metro DC Democratic Socialists of America.

== Early life and career ==
Raj was born and raised in West Chester, Pennsylvania. Her parents are immigrants from India. Raj attended Vanderbilt University, where she graduated with a Bachelor of Arts in political science and economics. In 2015, Raj moved to Washington, D.C..

Raj worked at food justice nonprofit DC Greens as a communications manager. Previously, she worked as a political researcher and as a consultant. From 2021 to 2026, Raj worked as a communications manager for progressive policy advocacy group Local Progress.

== Political career ==
During the first Trump administration, Raj organized for immigrants' rights. In 2019, the landlord for Raj's Columbia Heights group house ignored repair problems and stopped paying the mortgage. The property was foreclosed and sold to a real estate developer, who forced the tenants to move. Raj became a tenant organizer, convinced that renters needed more representation in local politics.

Raj is a member of the Metro DC Democratic Socialists of America (MDC DSA). In 2021, Raj was elected to the MDC DSA's Steering Committee. In 2023, Raj was elected to Chapter Chair.

On November 3, 2026, Raj was elected councilmember for Ward 1.

=== 2026 DC council campaign ===
On August 12, 2025, Raj announced her campaign for the 2026 Council of the District of Columbia election in Ward 1. Incumbent councilmember Brianne Nadeau later announced that she would not seek reelection, leaving an open Ward 1 race.

Raj's campaign platform included expanding rent stabilization to more properties and funding universal childcare through a corporate tax on large corporations doing business in the District. Her housing proposals included bringing newer buildings under rent control, restoring the Tenant Opportunity to Purchase Act as a universal right, ending exclusionary zoning, and allowing denser housing, including more family-sized units. She also supported stronger local protections for immigrants, legal defense funding for people facing detention or deportation, ending cooperation between the Metropolitan Police Department of the District of Columbia and U.S. Immigration and Customs Enforcement, and D.C. statehood. Raj ran to the left of Nadeau and outpaced the rest of the Ward 1 field in fundraising, raising more than $330,000 by April 2026. Her endorsements included the Amalgamated Transit Union Local 689, UNITE HERE Local 25, American Federation of Government Employees Locals 2725 and 2978, United Food and Commercial Workers Local 400, Communications Workers of America, Metro DC Democratic Socialists of America, the D.C. Working Families Party, Run for Something, Bike Walk Bus PAC, D.C. Women in Politics, and DC for Democracy.

In the lead up the general election, Raj spent the month of August in a Spanish language immersion program in Guatemala to better connect with the Ward's Latino population.

== Personal life ==
Raj identifies as bisexual. She lives in Columbia Heights with her husband, Stuart Karaffa, whom she married in 2025.
