= 2012 District of Columbia Republican presidential primary =

- April 3, 2012

16 pledged delegates to the 2012 Republican National Convention
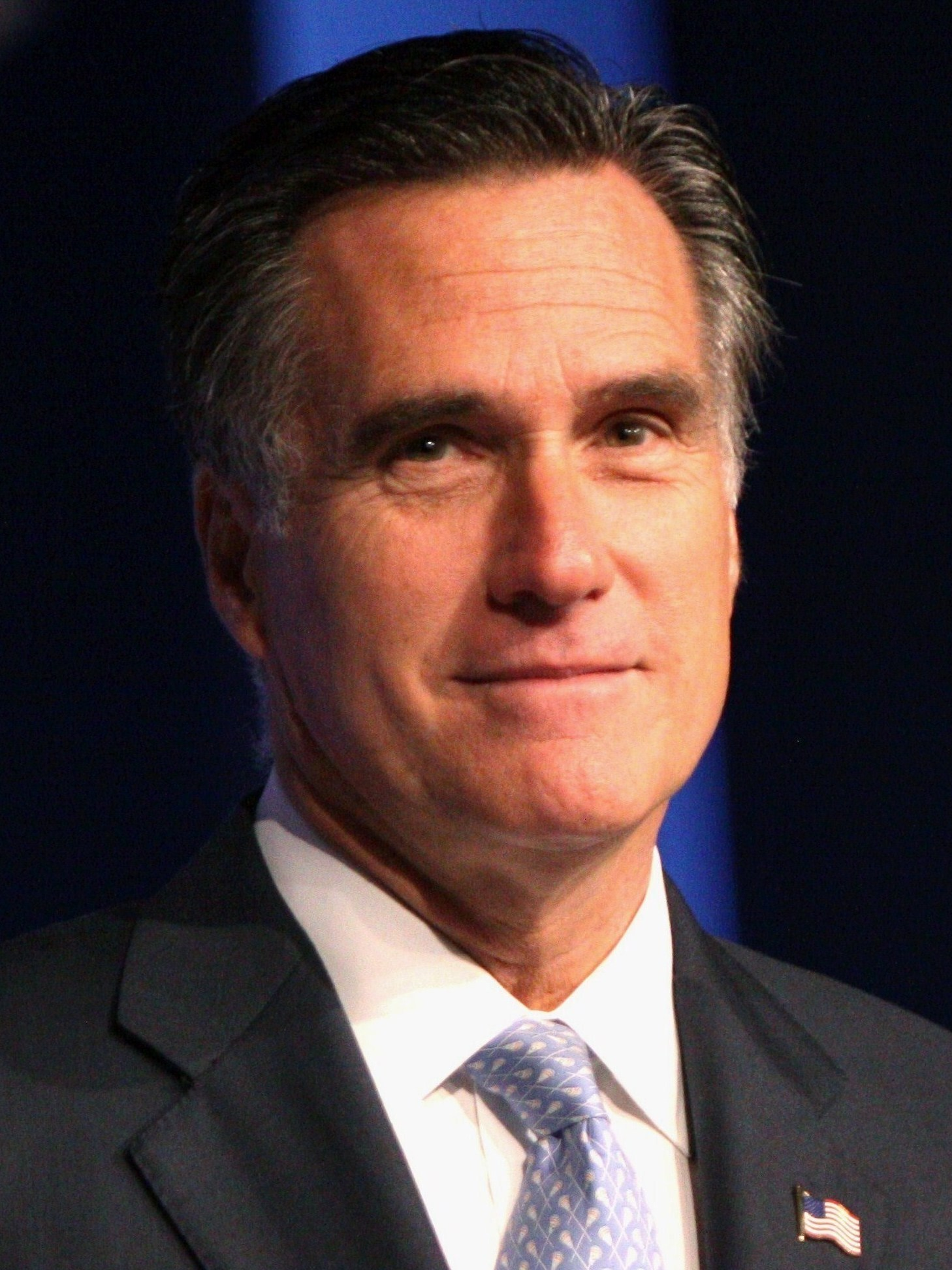

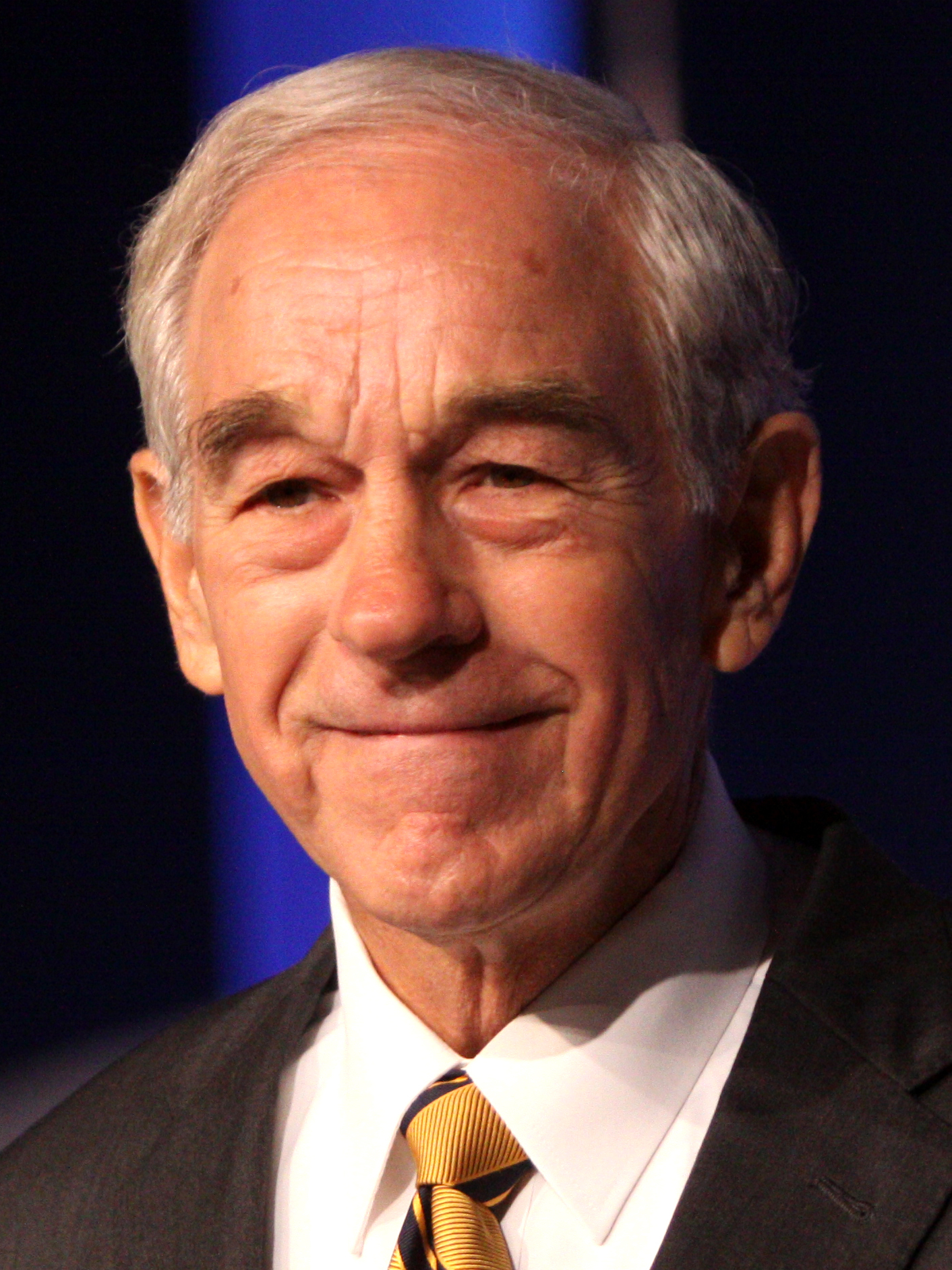

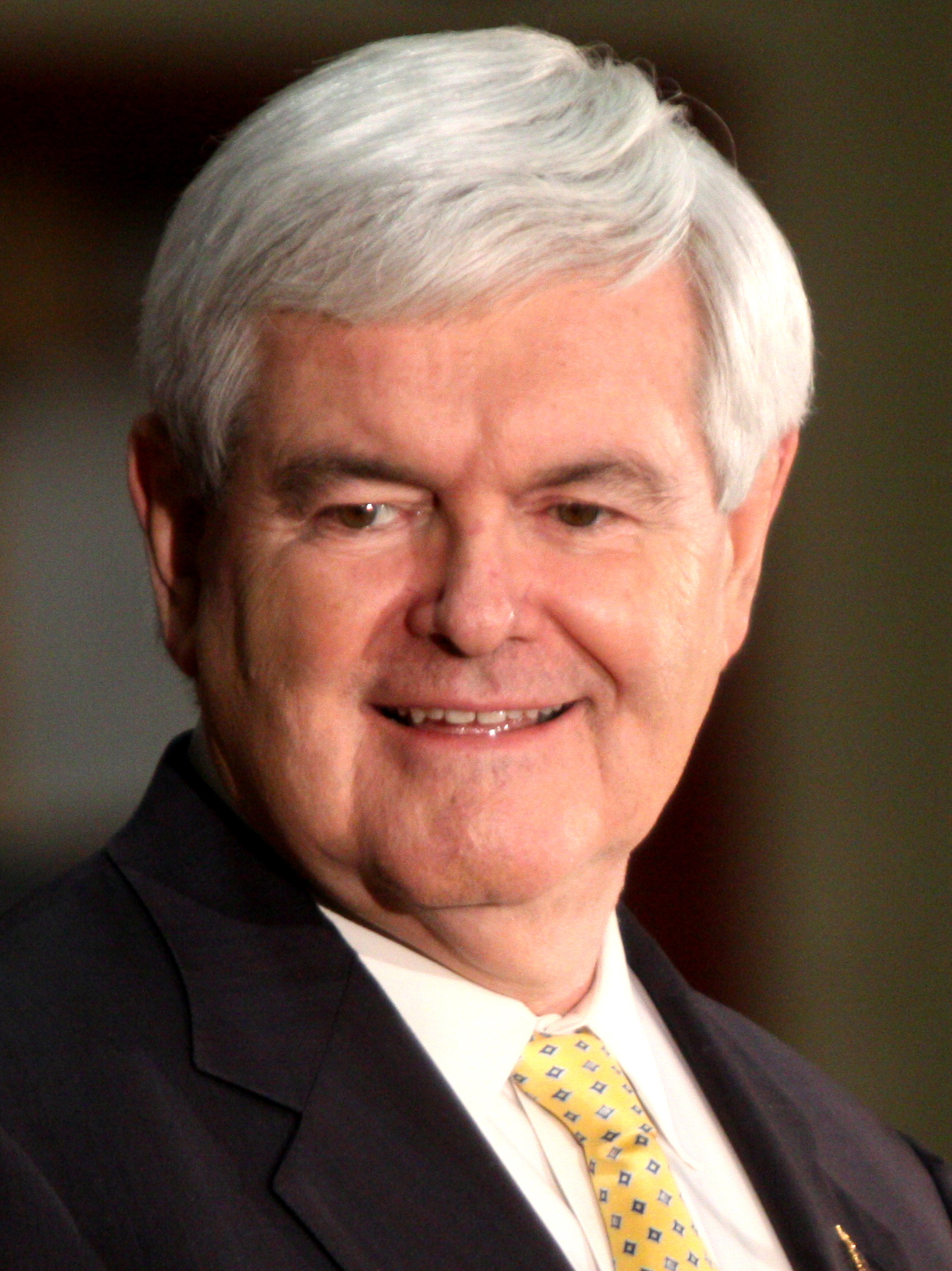

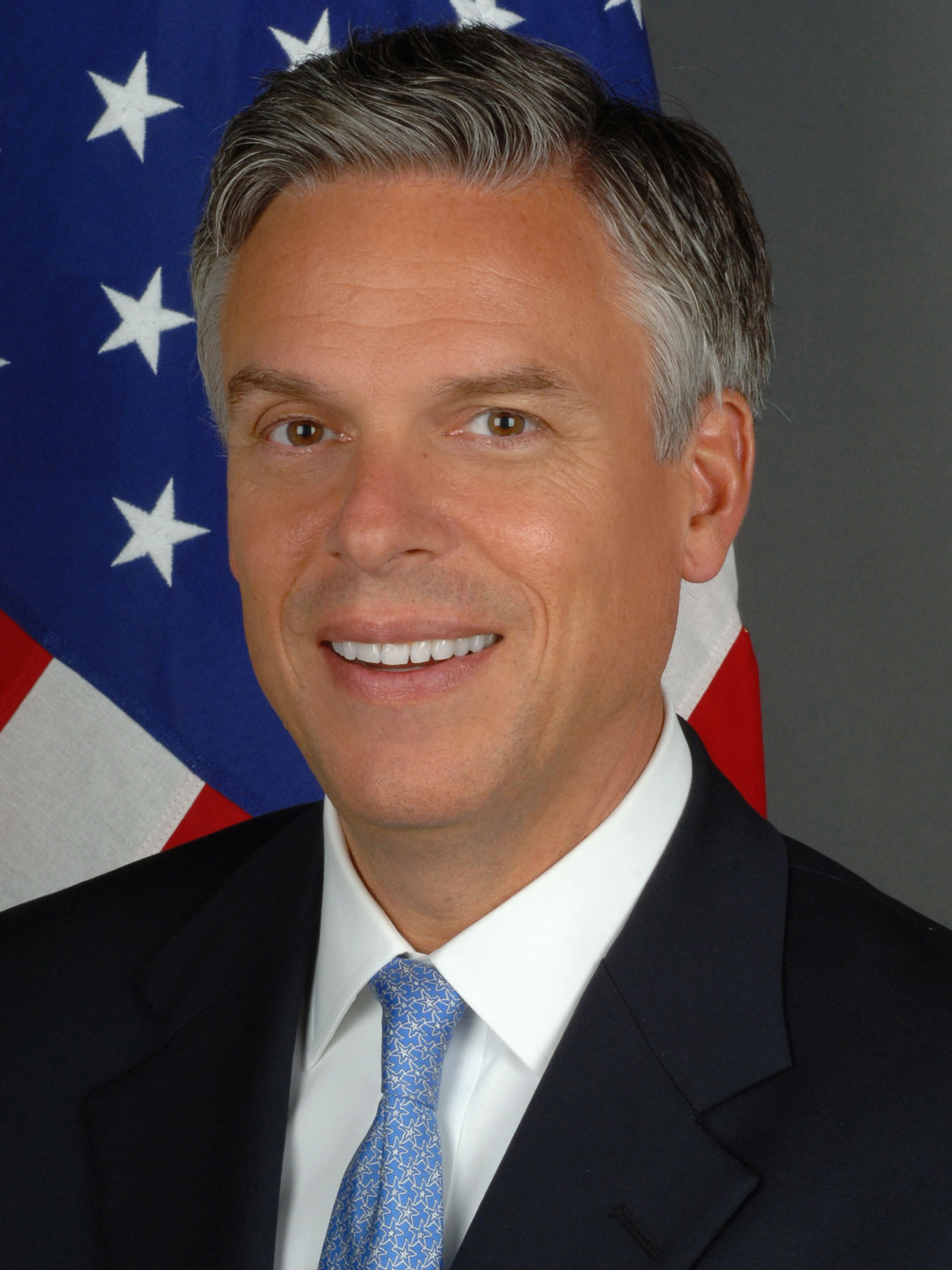
Candidate	Mitt Romney	Ron Paul
Home state	Massachusetts	Texas
Delegate count	18	0
Popular vote	3,577	621
Percentage	70.08%	12.17%
Candidate	Newt Gingrich	Jon Huntsman (withdrawn)
Home state	Georgia	Utah
Delegate count	0	0
Popular vote	558	348
Percentage	10.93%	6.82%
- Primary results by ward Mitt Romney

The 2012 District of Columbia Republican presidential primary was held on April 3, 2012, the same day as the Maryland and Wisconsin Republican primaries.

== Procedure ==
The District of Columbia Republican Party required a $5,000 contribution, signatures from one percent of registered Republicans, and the names of 16 potential delegates and 16 alternate delegates, who then must register with the District of Columbia Office of Campaign Finance. Alternatively, under II.D.1(c) a candidate need not file signatures with a $10,000 contribution. The District of Columbia Republican Party certified Newt Gingrich and Ron Paul in lieu of petitions under II.D.1(c). Rick Santorum was not included on the ballot because he did not meet these requirements.

The District of Columbia Republican Party decided not to allow write-in votes for the primary.

The District of Columbia's three superdelegates are Chairman Bob Kabel, Republican National Committeewoman Betsy Werronen, and Republican National Committeeman Tony Parker. Kabel and Werronen both support Mitt Romney.

== Results ==
The candidate with the most votes in the primary, Mitt Romney, was awarded sixteen delegates. Romney received the most votes in each of the District of Columbia's eight wards, receiving the majority of votes in wards 1, 2, 3, 4, and 6, and a plurality of votes in wards 5, 7, and 8. Paul received the second most votes in wards 1, 2, 4, 5, 6, and 8, while Gingrich received the second most votes in wards 3 and 7. Romney also received the most votes, or tied for the most votes, in 129 of the 143 voting precincts.

2012 District of Columbia Republican presidential primary
Candidate	Votes	Percentage	Delegates
Mitt Romney	3,577	70.08%	18
Ron Paul	621	12.17%	0
Newt Gingrich	558	10.93%	0
Jon Huntsman	348	6.82%	0
Unprojected delegates:			1
Under votes	153		
Total:	5,257	100%	19

Key:	Withdrew prior to contest
