= Phil Mendelson =

American politician (born 1952)

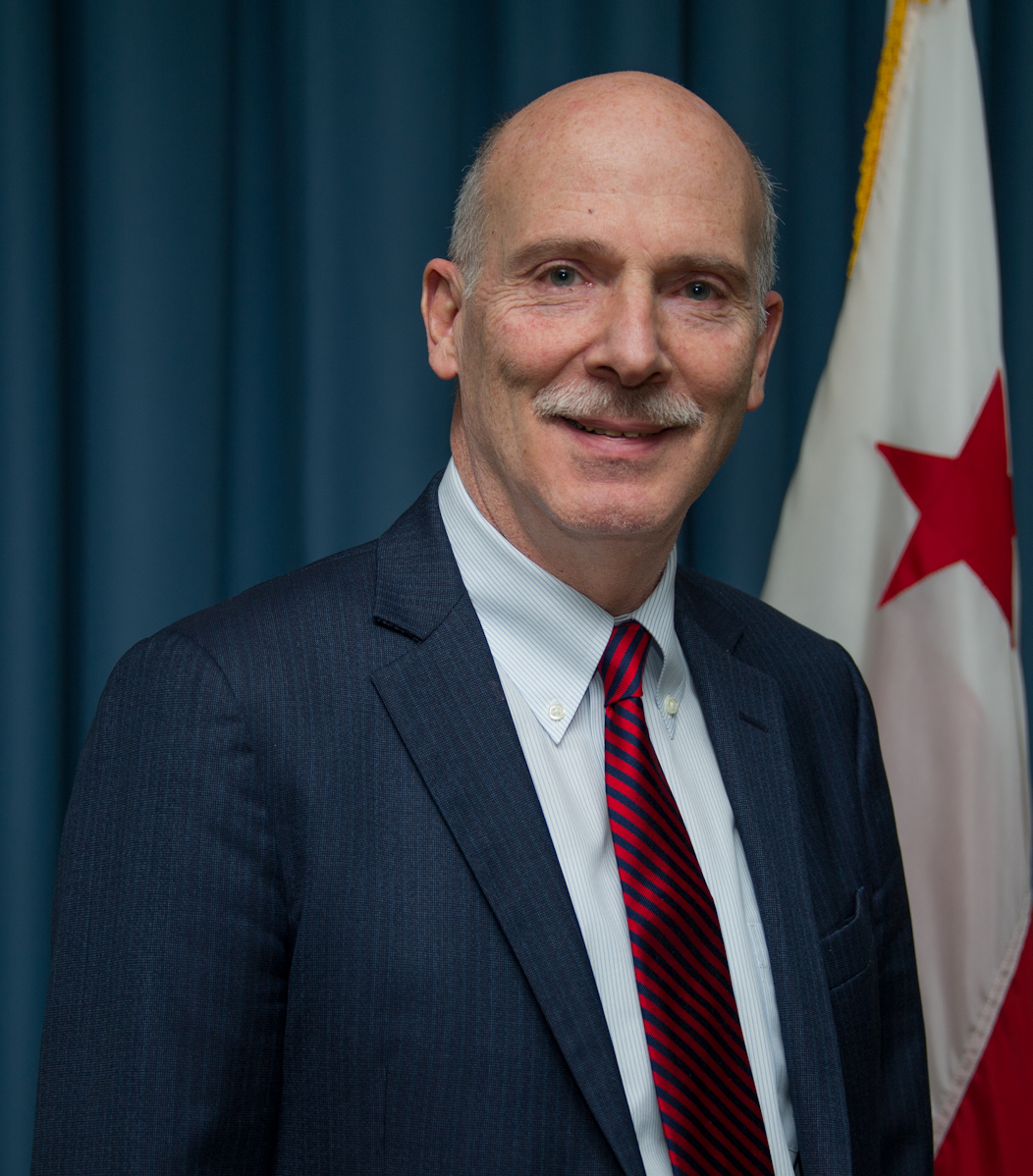
- Official portrait, 2017

9th Chair of the Council of the District of Columbia
- Incumbent
- Assumed office June 13, 2012; Acting: June 13, 2012 – November 29, 2012
- Preceded by: Mary Cheh (acting)

Member of the Council of the District of Columbia from the at-large district
- In office January 2, 1999 – November 29, 2012
- Preceded by: Hilda Mason
- Succeeded by: Anita Bonds

Personal details
- Born: Philip Heath Mendelson; November 8, 1952 (age 73) Cleveland, Ohio, U.S.
- Party: Democratic
- Education: American University (BA)
- Website: Office website Campaign website

Philip Heath Mendelson (born November 8, 1952) is an American politician from Washington, D.C. He is currently Chairman of the Council of the District of Columbia, elected by the Council on June 13, 2012, following the resignation of Kwame R. Brown. He was elected to serve the remainder of Brown's term in a citywide special election on November 6, 2012, and re-elected to a full term in 2014, 2018, and 2022.

== Early years ==
Mendelson was born in Cleveland and grew up in Cleveland Heights, Ohio, and came to Washington, D.C., in 1970 to attend American University. He graduated with a Bachelor of Arts degree.

== Political career ==
=== Advisory Neighborhood Commission ===
==== 1986–1989 ====
In 1986, Mendelson ran unopposed to represent McLean Gardens in Advisory Neighborhood Commission 3C. He won the election. In 1987, he was elected treasurer of Advisory Neighborhood Commission 3C.

Mendelson fought against a developer who wanted to build an office building on Wisconsin Avenue near Upton Street NW. Mendelson was opposed to the developer building an access road over a forested area. After his community group filed a lawsuit to block the road, a court determined that the developer had the right to build the access road. Mendelson tried to block the work using his own body, for which he was arrested. The wooded area was razed, and the access road was built.

Mendelson was critical of a policy of not assessing property taxes on a building until the roof is sealed. One particular developer saved $500,000 of property taxes from delaying the sealing of the roof until later in the construction timeline. Mendelson said the District of Columbia was losing significant amounts of tax revenue from what he called a loophole.

In 1988, Mendelson was elected to the D.C. Democratic State Committee, representing Ward 3, in 1988. He ran unopposed for reelection as an Advisory Neighborhood Commissioner, and he won the election. He was elected chair of Advisory Neighborhood Commission 3C soon thereafter.

==== 1990–1995 ====
In 1990, Mendelson resigned from the D.C. Democratic State Committee to work for the reelection campaign of Jim Nathanson, member of the Council of the District of Columbia representing Ward 3.

Also in 1990, Mendelson voiced his opposition to iron fences on the Duke Ellington Bridge in Rock Creek Park that were intended to prevent people from jumping off the bridge. He said the fences did not prevent suicide because there were more suicide attempts from the bridge after the fences were erected. An increase in suicide attempts from the nearby Taft Bridge demonstrated that the fences merely diverted, rather than deterred, suicide attempts in his opinion. Mendelson argued against putting fences up again after the Duke Ellington Bridge's scheduled reconstruction and instead post phone numbers for suicide prevention hotlines on the bridge. He was also opposed to building fences on the Taft Bridge. A group of local mental health physicians was in favor of the fences, saying the fences were worthwhile even if they did not deter every suicide attempt.

Mendelson ran unopposed for reelection as an Advisory Neighborhood Commissioner in 1990; he won the election.

When the owner of a residential building proposed constructing townhouses in front of the apartments, Mendelson opposed the idea, saying, "It makes no sense to put eight townhouses on the lawn of an apartment building."

In 1992, Mayor Sharon Pratt Kelly's task force on the homeless made a recommendation that shelter beds should be located equally throughout the District. Other than a few churches, there were no homeless shelters located in Ward 3 at the time. The ward's council member Jim Nathanson opposed establishing homeless shelters in Ward 3. Mendelson was also opposed, saying, "There's no right for the homeless to get shelter in any neighborhood they want."

In 1992, Mendelson ran unopposed for reelection as an Advisory Neighborhood Commissioner and won the election. He was subsequently elected vice-chair of Advisory Neighborhood Commission 3C, which represents residents of Cleveland Park, Cathedral Heights, Massachusetts Heights, and Woodley Park.

==== 1996–1998 ====
In 1996, Mendelson ran for an at-large seat on the Council. Mendelson's campaign focused on holding government employees accountable, hiring qualified individuals for government positions, and cutting wasteful and ineffective programs. Mendelson criticized incumbent Harold Brazil for conspicuously leaving a Council meeting just before a vote on whether to reduce pension benefits for newly hired police officers, firefighters, and teachers. Mendelson said Brazil's absence was in line with many other important votes that Brazil for which was absent. He said all Council members should accept a cut in salary due to recent poor performance of the Council.

Brazil won the Democratic primary election. Mendelson came in fourth place with seven percent of the vote. While Mendelson did not appear on the ballot for Advisory Neighborhood Commissioner, he was only individual to notify the Board of Elections that he was willing to represent Single Member District 3C06, and therefore the Board certified him the Advisory Neighborhood Commissioner for that district.

When Congress began moving more and more responsibilities from the District Government to the District of Columbia Financial Control Board, Mendelson argued against doing so, saying that only removes accountability from Mayor Marion Barry. Mendelson said that Mayor Barry should have enough control over the District in order for voters to be able to judge his actions. "These end runs, so to speak, in a way empower Barry, because they get him off the hook and play into the voters' reliance on other people to solve our problems."

In 1997, the District Department of Recreation tore down a playground in McLean Gardens because it was rotting, splintered, and dangerous. Mendelson criticized the Department of Recreation for not informing residents ahead of time and for not replacing the equipment immediately. A spokesperson for the Department said that the new playground equipment would be installed within two weeks.

The Washington Post wrote an article detailing how the District of Columbia Department of Consumer and Regulatory Affairs does not consistently enforce District laws, does not consistently collect the fees it is due, and has insufficient authority to do either. Mendelson noted that residents build decks without permits and receive no penalty, and neighbors have no recourse. Mendelson said that the Department could only advise residents of the law, and he advocated for giving the Department more authority to enforce the laws that it has purview over. Mendelson later advocated against the Council's confirmation of W. David Watts as the agency's director, saying that the Council was not confirming the best individual for the position. Mendelson continued to advocate for simplifying regulatory requirements and increasing enforcement. When the Council unanimously passed a bill to reform the regulatory process, Mendelson said it was hastily written and had not been opened to enough public opinion. Mendelson asked the Financial Control Board to overturn the Council's bill. While Council member David Catania admitted the bill was not perfect, he also took issue with Mendelson's approach, saying it undermined District home rule.

In 1998, the Financial Control Board considered repealing a law that required environmental impact statements for private projects costing more than $1 million. The Financial Control Board said repealing the law would make it easier to do business in the District. Mendelson opposed the repeal, saying that environmental impact statements can reveal potential public health hazards before they occur and that preparation of the statements is not sufficiently onerous to offset the potential benefits. The Financial Control Board ended up increasing the threshold from $1 million to $5 million.

=== Council of the District of Columbia ===
On June 14, 1998, Mendelson announced he would run again for an at-large seat on the Council of the District of Columbia. Mendelson said the public needed to be better informed about the incumbent Council's meetings and votes. He said residents only hear from Council members when they are up for reelection.

Mendelson said the District should be proactive about recruiting developers and businesses, and he thought he could play a role in doing so as a member of the Council. He also said the Council should do more during debates on education.

Mendelson's candidacy was endorsed by the editorial board of The Washington Post the Metropolitan Washington AFL–CIO, the Sierra Club, and the tenant advocacy council TENAC.

Mendelson came in first place in the Democratic primary election with 17 percent of the vote, advancing to the general election.

Mayor Marion Barry endorsed Mendelson's candidacy in the general election. The editorial board of The Washington Post endorsed independent candidate Beverly Wilbourn and Republican incumbent David Catania in the general election.

Mendelson won the general election with 37 percent of the vote. He was sworn in on January 2, 1999. Because Mendelson had no seniority on the Council, Council Chair Linda W. Cropp did not assign him to chair any committees, but he was appointed as a representative to the Metropolitan Washington Council of Governments.

In 1999, Mendelson and Catania sponsored a bill to amend a law that required most contractors to hire a majority of District residents to complete contracts with the District government. The new bill would reduce monetary penalties for noncompliance, and ban non-compliant companies from doing business with the District for three years.

Mendelson criticized the Council for passing acts as emergency legislation, which bypasses Congressional review and lasts for a short amount of time, even though the acts were not intended to fill temporary or urgent needs. Mendelson was opposed to Mayor Anthony Williams' proposal to have a children's theme park on islands in the Anacostia River.

From 2005 to 2012 Mendelson served as the chair of the DC Council's Committee on the Judiciary. In 2011 he supported the effort to establish an elected attorney general and pushed for an independent Forensic Science Crime Lab.

Mendelson was re-elected in 2002, 2006, and 2010.

In 2012, Kwame Brown resigned from the position of Chair of the Council. In a vote of 11 to 1, the Council voted to appoint Mendelson to the position of interim Chair of the Council. In a special election held in November 2012, Mendelson was elected by District voters to the position of Chair of the Council. He was elected to a full term as chair in 2014.

From a regional standpoint, Mendelson worked with his counterparts in Montgomery and Prince George's Counties to increase the minimum wage.

Mendelson has received national attention for his work to bring Budget Autonomy for the District, the city's laws on gun control and same-sex marriage legalization.

==== 2016 ====
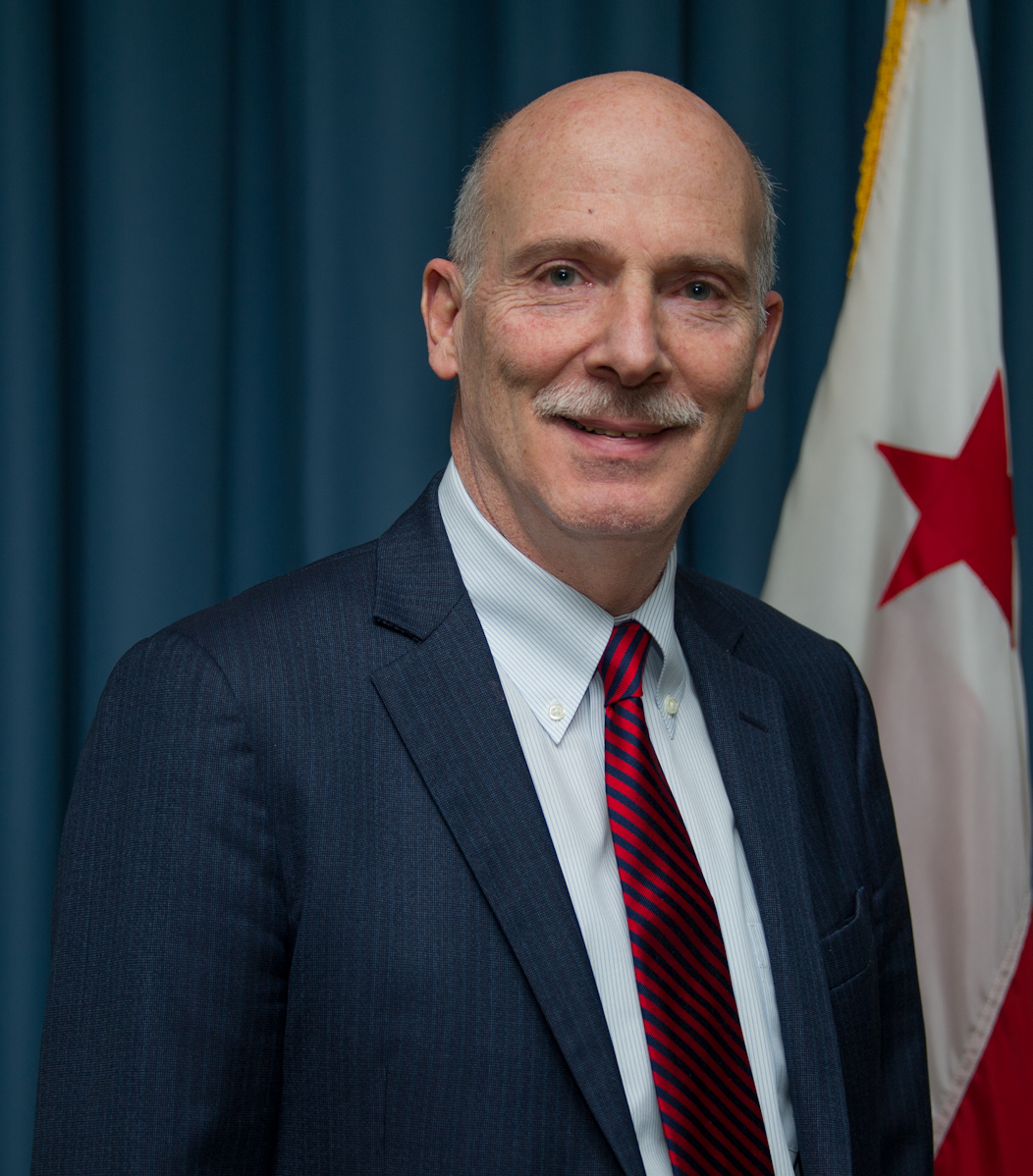
Mendelson in 2017

In 2016, Mendelson overhauled Mayor Bowser's plan to close DC General homeless shelter and build multiple smaller shelters in its place. He shepherded Universal Paid Leave through the Council.

==== 2018 ====
Mendelson ran for a third term, facing progressive challenger Ed Lazere, and won renomination with 63% of the vote. He won the general election over Libertarian candidate Ethan Bishop-Henchman.

In 2019, Mendelson proposed changes that would significantly limit the ability for the public to access government records through the Freedom of Information Act. Mendelson claimed that the changes were necessary to limit frivolous requests while activists insisted that the changes would prevent the public from uncovering fraud, waste, and abuses. Mendelson was also criticized for introducing the changes as a technical amendment, not separate legislation, which would require a public hearing.

Mendelson was an active proponent for a no-bid, sole-source contract to launch the District's sports betting program. Mendelson insisted that a competitive bid for the $215 million contract would result in unacceptable delays of two to three years. He downplayed the inexperience of local partners and claimed that any award would risk conflicts of interest. After the Council narrowly approved the bid, it was discovered that the main local partner had no employees and was led by a Maryland resident.

==== 2021 ====
After 3 years of budget battles, Mendelson was finally able to fully fund the Tipped Worker Fairness Act of 2018 a long-sought compromise bill stemming from the battle over Initiative 77. Among the many additional regulations surrounding hospitality venue operations, this bill formed the Tipped Workers Coordinating Council within the DC government to oversee the implementation of the law and act as a formal body to make policy recommendations to the appropriate District agency. Importantly this council is made up of directors of several District agencies along with 4 seats reserved for workers, 2 appointed by the Mayor and 2 by the DC Council Chairman. Mendelson appointed known hospitality advocate Zachary Hoffman in May 2021 with the other seat vacant for some time.

==== 2026 ====
Mendelson is being challenged by former Councilmember Jack Evans in his re-election campaign for D.C. Council chair. In April 2026, Mendelson admitted to using official resources in his challenge to Evans' nominating petitions. The Office of Campaign Finance opened an official investigation on April 5, 2026.

== Other activities ==
Mendelson has served as a trustee of the Committee of 100 on the Federal City, a member of the board of the Metropolitan Washington Council of Governments, and as the president of the Association of Metropolitan Planning Organizations.

== Personal life ==
Mendelson is divorced from Constance G. (Connie) Ridgway.

Mendelson and Ridgway have a daughter, Adelaide Marie Ridgway-Mendelson, born July 29, 2000.

Mendelson lives in Capitol Hill.

== Electoral history ==
=== 1996 ===
1996 Council of the District of Columbia, Democratic primary, at-large
Party	Candidate	Votes	%
Democratic	Harold Brazil	17,465	42
Democratic	Joseph P. Yeldell	9,230	22
Democratic	John Capozzi	6,092	15
Democratic	Phil Mendelson	3,117	7
Democratic	Kathryn A. Pearson-West	2,015	5
Democratic	Paul Savage	1,941	5
Democratic	Ronnie Edwards	791	2
Democratic	Ernest E. Johnson	664	2
Democratic	Write-in	258	1

=== 1998 ===
1998 Council of the District of Columbia, Democratic primary, at-large
Party	Candidate	Votes	%
Democratic	Phil Mendelson	14,089	17
Democratic	Linda Moody	11,532	14
Democratic	William H. "Rev" Bennett II	11,336	14
Democratic	Bill Rice	11,087	14
Democratic	Phyllis J. Outlaw	10,769	13
Democratic	Sabrina Sojourner	9,725	12
Democratic	Don Reeves	4,130	5
Democratic	Charles Gaither	3,721	5
Democratic	Greg Rhett	2,646	3
Democratic	Kathryn A. Pearson-West	2,485	3
Democratic	Write-in	718	1

1998 Council of the District of Columbia general election, at-large
Party	Candidate	Votes	%
Democratic	Phil Mendelson	71,799	37
Republican	David A. Catania	40,200	21
DC Statehood	Hilda Mason	28,615	15
Independent	Beverly J. Wilbourn	22,946	12
Independent	Malik Z. Shabazz	15,644	8
Umoja	Mark Thompson	9,733	5
Independent	Sandra "SS" Seegars	2,764	1
	Write-in	648	0

=== 2002 ===
2002 Council of the District of Columbia, Democratic primary, at-large
Party	Candidate	Votes	%
Democratic	Phil Mendelson	38,681	43
Democratic	Beverly Wilbourn	26,379	29
Democratic	Dwight E. Singleton	16,749	19
Democratic	M. Muhammad Shabazz	4,098	5
Democratic	Al-Malik Farrakhan	3,655	4
Democratic	Write-in	933	1

2002 Council of the District of Columbia general election, at-large
Party	Candidate	Votes	%
Democratic	Phil Mendelson	90,316	47
Republican	David A. Catania	51,698	27
Independent	Eugene Dewitt Kinlow	17,522	9
DC Statehood Green	Michele Tingling-Clemmons	13,828	7
Independent	Chris Ray	5,879	3
Independent	A.D. "Tony" Dominguez	4,395	2
Independent	Ahmad Braxton-Jones	3,708	2
Independent	Kweku Toure	3,304	2
	Write-in	1,115	1

=== 2006 ===
2006 Council of the District of Columbia, Democratic primary, at-large
Party	Candidate	Votes	%
Democratic	Phil Mendelson	62,776	64
Democratic	A. Scott Bolden	35,486	36
Democratic	Write-in	468	0

2006 Council of the District of Columbia general election, at-large
Party	Candidate	Votes	%
Democratic	Phil Mendelson	90,599	51
Independent	David A. Catania	58,293	33
DC Statehood Green	Ann C. Wilcox	12,390	7
Independent	Antonio "Tony" Dominguez	8,759	5
Republican	Marcus Skelton	8,199	5
	Write-in	912	1

=== 2010 ===
Council of the District of Columbia, Democratic primary, at-large
Party	Candidate	Votes	%
Democratic	Phil Mendelson	77,127	63
Democratic	Michael D. Brown	34,829	28
Democratic	Dorothy Douglas	6,922	6
Democratic	Write-in	812	1

2010 Council of the District of Columbia, general election, at-large
Party	Candidate	Votes	%
Democratic	Phil Mendelson	105,296	56
Independent	David A. Catania	57,163	31
DC Statehood Green	David Schwartzman	12,697	7
Independent	Richard Urban	9,668	5
	Write-in	1,839	1

=== 2012 ===
2012 Council of the District of Columbia, Chair, Special Election
Party	Candidate	Votes	%
Democratic	Phil Mendelson	174,742	71
Democratic	Calvin H. Gurley	69,342	28
Democratic	Write-in	3,017	1

=== 2014 ===
2014 Council of the District of Columbia, Democratic primary, chair
Party	Candidate	Votes	%
Democratic	Phil Mendelson	69,138	81
Democratic	Calvin H. Gurley	15,178	18
Democratic	Write-in	825	1

2014 Council of the District of Columbia general election, chair
Party	Candidate	Votes	%
Democratic	Phil Mendelson	138,066	78
Republican	Kris Hammond	12,114	7
Independent	John C. Cheeks	6,949	4
DC Statehood Green	G. Lee Aikin	5,930	3
Libertarian	Kyle Walker	3,674	2
	Write-in	849	0

=== 2018 ===
2018 Council of the District of Columbia, Democratic primary, chair
Party	Candidate	Votes	%
Democratic	Phil Mendelson	48,848	63.02
Democratic	Ed Lazere	28,280	36.48
Democratic	Write-in	384	0.5

2018 Council of the District of Columbia general election, chair
Party	Candidate	Votes	%
Democratic	Phil Mendelson	198,639	89.13
Libertarian	Ethan Bishop-Henchman	18,708	8.39
	Write-in	5,516	2.48

Political offices
Preceded by Mary Cheh; Acting	Chair of the Council of the District of Columbia; 2012–present	Incumbent
