= Brianne Nadeau =

American politician (born 1980)

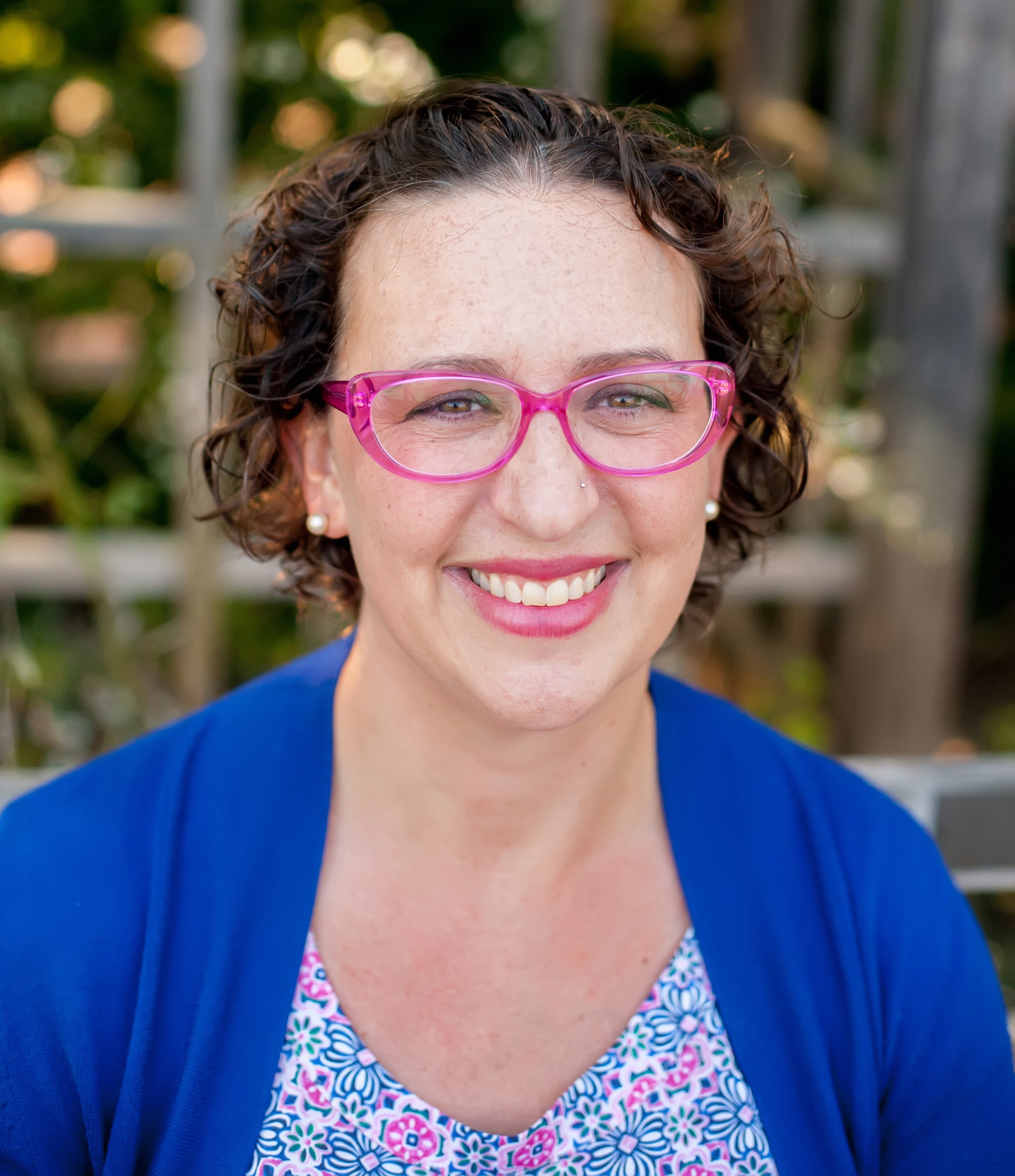
- Official portrait, 2020

Member of the Council of the District of Columbia from the 1st ward
- Incumbent
- Assumed office January 2, 2015
- Preceded by: Jim Graham

Personal details
- Born: October 11, 1980 (age 45) Michigan, U.S.
- Party: Democratic
- Domestic partner: Jayson Harpster
- Education: Boston College (BA); American University (MPP)
- Website: Official website

Brianne Kruger Nadeau (born October 11, 1980) is an American Democratic politician in Washington, D.C., and a member of the Council of the District of Columbia representing Ward 1 since 2015. She defeated long-time incumbent Jim Graham in the Democratic Party primary and won the general election with 75% of the vote in 2014. She is the first woman to represent Ward 1 on the council and the first D.C. Councilmember to give birth while serving in office. Nadeau announced she would not seek a fourth term on September 25, 2025.

== Early life and professional career ==
Brianne K. Nadeau was born into a Jewish family in Michigan, growing up in Grosse Pointe. A Girl Scout for 13 years, she earned a Gold Award, the Scouts' highest honor. Nadeau has said that Girl Scouts taught her to look for work and to leave things better than you found them.

Nadeau graduated from Boston College with a bachelor's degree in political science in 2002. She also earned a master's degree in public policy from American University in 2006. She worked as a scheduler for Congressman John Sarbanes of Maryland.

Nadeau worked as a public relations consultant and vice president for Rabinowitz Communications, where she promoted progressive causes for nonprofit organizations. Nadeau was a member of the board of directors of Jews United for Justice, a charitable organization that helps pursue justice and equality in local community. She was active in the District of Columbia chapter of the Anti-Defamation League.

== Political experience ==
=== Advisory Neighborhood Commission ===
Nadeau served as Advisory Neighborhood Commissioner for district 1B05 from 2007 to 2011.

=== 2014 campaign for Council and election ===
Nadeau ran against four-term member of the Council of the District of Columbia Jim Graham in the Democratic Party primary election in 2014. Her candidacy was endorsed by At-large Council Member David Grosso, Ward Six Council Member Tommy Wells, progressive political action committee Democracy for America, and the editorial boards of The Washington Post, the Washington City Paper and Northwest Current.

During her campaign, Nadeau emphasized such issues as affordable housing, transportation, constituent services, and the need to provide long-term solutions to recurring problems.

Nadeau criticized Graham for actions he took in 2008 which resulted in the District Council reprimanding Graham for improperly interfering with the awarding of a government contract. Graham said his actions may have been political horse-trading rather than anything illegal or unethical.

During the campaign, Graham accused Nadeau of irregularities in connection to a home-buyer program. According to Graham, in 2009 Nadeau had asked Graham and then-Council Chair Vincent Gray for help with a home-buyer program. Nadeau had been approved for the loan two years earlier, but the income-based loan guarantee was reduced because her salary had increased since then. Graham said that signing her letters with her title as an Advisory Neighborhood Commissioner was inappropriate and unethical. Nadeau defended the letters, saying she was about to lose her home and simply advocated for herself the best way she could. Following an investigation, the Inspector General cleared Nadeau and found that all the allegations were unsubstantiated.

Nadeau defeated Graham in the primary election by a wide margin. In the general election, Nadeau was on the ballot with independent Ernest Johnson and Libertarian John Vaught LaBeaume; there was no Republican candidate on the ballot. Nadeau went on to win the general election as well.

In 2016, her 2014 campaign was audited by the Office of Campaign Finance.

=== 2018 campaign for Council ===
In mid-2017, Nadeau announced that she would run for a second term on the DC Council. As of August 2017, she had outraised her challengers, with approximately one-third of her campaign contributions coming from developers, lawyers, lobbyists, and corporations. Nadeau, along with several other council members, sends out periodic mailers to her constituents. The practice has been criticized as possible taxpayer-funded campaigning.

=== 2022 re-election to Council ===
Nadeau again took the victory in the general election for the D.C. City Council Ward 1 seat. She won with almost 80% of the vote.

== Time on the Council of the District of Columbia ==
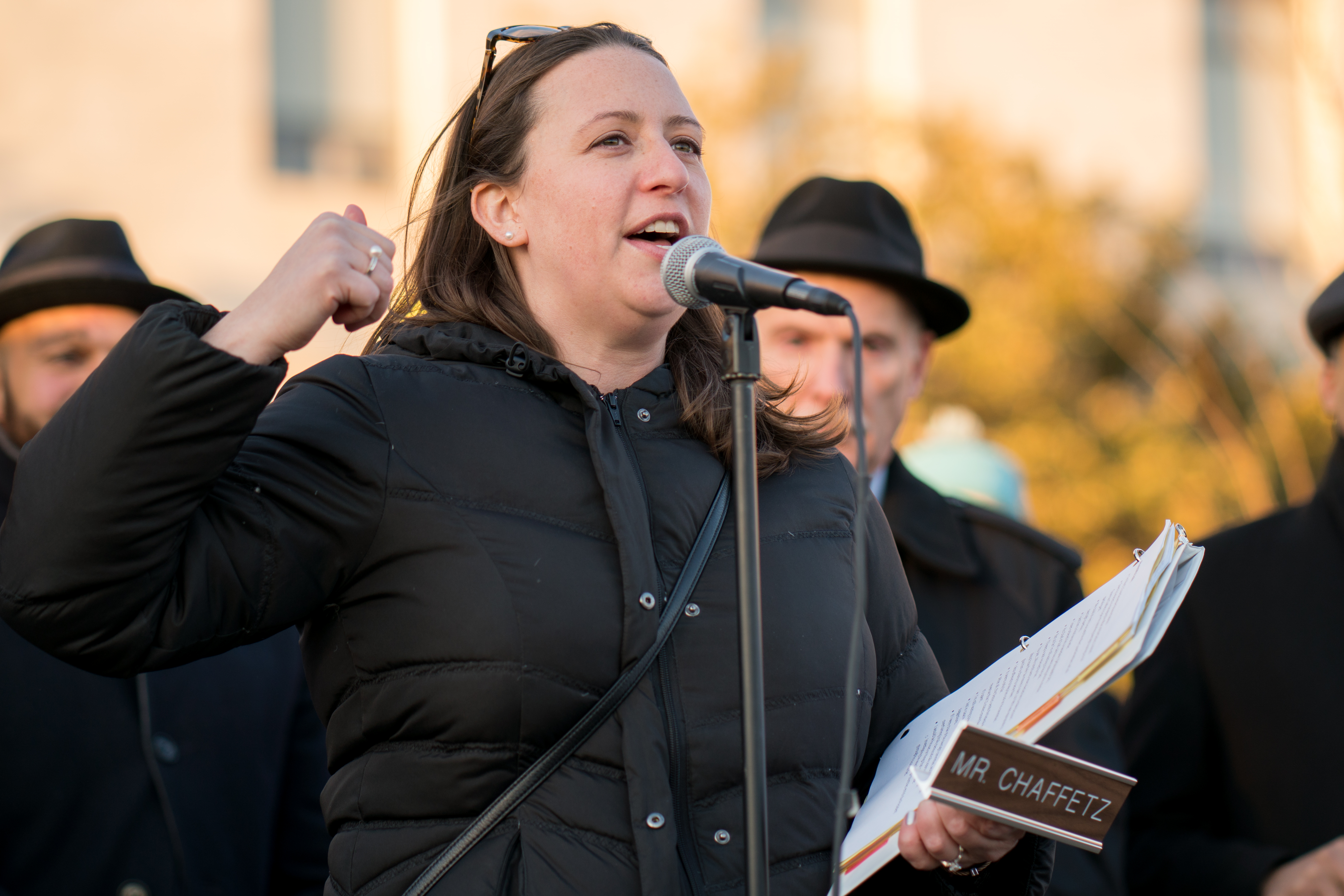
Nadeau speaking in 2017

=== Human Services Committee ===
In 2017, Nadeau became Chair of the D.C Council's Human Services Committee.

==== TANF ====
In 2015, Temporary Assistance to Needy Families, the District's welfare program, was scheduled to terminate benefits for 6,000 very-low income families. Prior to her tenure as chair of the Human Services Committee, Nadeau introduced a bill that would have extended benefits for many of the families scheduled to lose support. As chair, she passed a reform of TANF along the lines of her earlier bill that would not cut benefits.

==== Homeless Services Reform Act ====
During Nadeau's tenure as chair, Mayor Bowser in 2017 proposed a bill to reform the District's emergency homelessness system that would increase from one to two the number of documents homeless residents would need to prove their District residency. The bill was opposed by a coalition of homeless services providers for its more stringent proof-of-residency requirements, some of which were moderated. The Washington Post editorial board supported the bill. The reform was passed in May 2018.

==== Disability Reform ====
Also during Nadeau's tenure as chair, the Human Services Committee considered reform of the Department of Disability Services to end the practice of civil commitments for persons with intellectual disabilities. The reform passed the council and will become law on May 18, 2018.

=== D.C. Fair Elections Act ===
In December 2015, Nadeau co-introduced the D.C. Fair Elections Act, which would use public funds to match campaign contributions to candidates who agree to accept lower maximum contribution limits. The bill passed the DC Council, and was signed into law by Mayor Bowser in March 2018.

=== Affordable housing ===
Nadeau serves on the D.C. Council's Committee on Housing and Neighborhood Revitalization. Nadeau was one of two Councilmembers to vote against a bill that would exempt all single-family homes from the tenant protections of the District's Tenant Opportunity to Purchase Act. Nadeau told a reporter that the bill was too broad and did not find a balance between the rights of homeowners and renters.

In July 2015, Nadeau proposed emergency legislation to facilitate the sale of land at 965 Florida Avenue NW by the District of Columbia to developers MRP Realty, Ellis Development, and JBG Smith. The city sold the parcels for $400,000, well below their estimated value of between $5 million and $27.6 million. Nadeau defended the decision in an op-ed in the Washington Post. She cited her commitment to affordable housing and explained the District discounted the price of the land in exchange for the developer building 106 units of affordable housing on the site as well as a grocery store with 270 permanent jobs.

=== Gun violence ===
In the wake of the Pulse shooting, Nadeau called on Congress to address gun violence in local communities and stop blocking District laws. In 2017, Nadeau introduced a bill that would authorize a court to issue a temporary civil protection order, temporarily prohibiting someone from having firearms if the court has a reasonable belief that the subject poses an immediate risk to themselves or others. The D.C. Council's Judiciary Committee held a public hearing on the bill on March 22, 2018.

=== Crime and policing ===
Nadeau has come under increasing scrutiny from her constituents for her stance on crime enforcement due in large part to the noticeable increase in crime throughout her ward during her tenure. Despite public statements of concern, her perceived lack of action and the continued violence in her ward has led many residents to call for more and better action to combat the rising crime rate. Nadeau has been critical of police in the district and supported the disbanding of police Vice Squads in 2015, over resistance from the DC Police Union, after a study revealed that 83% of those stopped by the department were Black. In 2024, a recall effort was launched by local activists due to the doubling of homicides in a single year under her term.

=== Baby boxes ===
In 2014, Nadeau introduced a bill to provide "baby boxes" for all newborns in the District to encourage safe sleep practices and reduce the infant mortality rate, which in the District in 2014 was 27 percent above the national rate. The boxes are lined with a firm mattress and a fitted sheet and serve as a bassinet for infants. They come with essential items such as diapers, wipes and onesies.

=== Street harassment ===
Nadeau has spoken publicly about her experiences of street harassment as a woman in public space in the District, including by a government employee on duty in uniform. She introduced a bill to end street harassment in the District. The bill focuses on education and training and creates a task force to study and collect data on the issue. At Nadeau's request, the Council held its first ever hearing on the subject in 2015.

=== Initiative 77 ===
Nadeau initially opposed the Initiative 77 ballot measure to eliminate the tip credit for workers who receive tips as part of their wages. When DC voters approved the measure in a referendum, Nadeau opposed the DC Council measure that overturned the vote.

=== Pepco-Exelon merger ===
In May 2015, Nadeau opposed the proposed merger between Exelon and Pepco, expressing concerns about the impact on costs and renewable energy. In October 2015, Nadeau changed her position and urged regulators to support the deal, stating that her original concerns had been addressed by a settlement among Exelon, the Mayor, Attorney General, and Office of the People's Counsel that included additional concessions from Exelon.

== Committees ==
Nadeau serves on the following committees:

- Committee on Human Services, Chair
- Committee on Government Operations
- Committee on Health
- Committee on Housing and Neighborhood Revitalization
- Committee of the Whole

== Personal life ==
Nadeau had lived in the District of Columbia for 13 years when she was elected to the Council in 2014. She lives in the Park View neighborhood and is married to Jayson Harpster, a Kaiser Permanente consultant.

Nadeau and Harpster's daughter was born in September 2017. Nadeau is the first D.C. Councilmember to give birth while in office. Nadeau made national headlines a few months later when she pumped breast milk on the dais while she was chairing a long hearing. Nadeau stated that she did not want to recess the committee.

== Electoral results ==
2006 General Election, Advisory Neighborhood Commission, Single Member District 1B05
Party	Candidate	Votes	%
Nonpartisan	Brianne K. Nadeau	175	64
Nonpartisan	Howard P. Wilson	92	34
	Write-In	6	2

2008 General Election, Advisory Neighborhood Commission, Single Member District 1B05
Party	Candidate	Votes	%
Nonpartisan	Brianne K. Nadeau	518	96
	Write-In	24	4

2014 Democratic Primary, Council of the District of Columbia, Ward 1
Party	Candidate	Votes	%
Democratic	Brianne K. Nadeau	6,688	59
Democratic	Jim Graham	4,642	41
Democratic	Write-In	57	1

2014 General Election, Council of the District of Columbia, Ward 1
Party	Candidate	Votes	%
Democratic	Brianne K. Nadeau	17,024	75
Independent	Ernest E. Johnson	2,021	9
Libertarian	John Vaught LaBeaume	829	4
	Write-In	207	1
