= Ed Lazere =

American politician

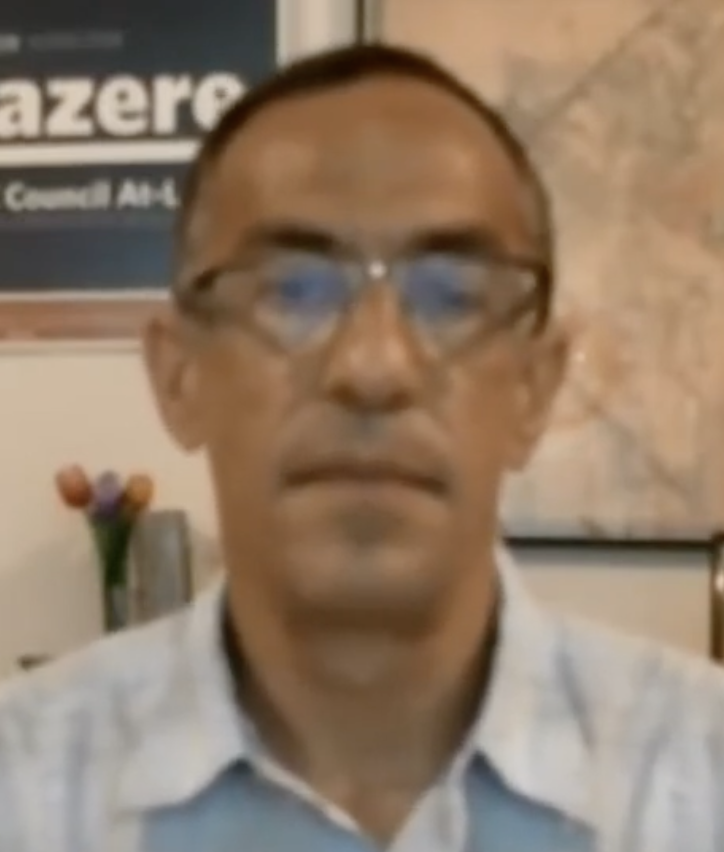

Personal details
- Born: 1964 or 1965 (age 61–62)
- Party: Democratic
- Education: Harvard University (BA); University of Maryland (MPP)

Ed Lazere (born 1964 or 1965) is an American policy analyst, advocacy leader, and longtime director of the DC Fiscal Policy Institute, a progressive think tank. In 2018, he ran for Chair of the Council of the District of Columbia.

== Early life and education ==
Lazere attended Harvard University and later earned a master's degree in public policy from the University of Maryland.

== Career ==
Lazere is the Legislative Advocacy Director at United Planning Organization, a community development organization in Washington, DC. Lazere started the new position in August 2022.

Lazere was an inaugural staff member of DCFPI, which he joined in 2001 and led until 2020. Previously, he held positions at Higher Achievement, an education advocacy group, and the Center on Budget and Policy Priorities, a progressive think-tank with a national scope.

=== DC Fiscal Policy Institute ===
Following the end of the Control Board, which oversaw DC finances with a congressional mandate, Lazere's involvement was the only counterbalance outside the regular checks and balances built into D.C.'s budget system.

Lazere has argued against public subsidies for developers. When the DC government gave $75 million in tax increment financing to support the construction of Gallery Place, Lazere insisted that the land, some of the most valuable in the city, would have been developed regardless. Lazere took a similar stance when Mayor Anthony Williams provided a lucrative package to developers for construction of Nationals Park and bringing baseball to DC. In 2004, Lazere and DCFPI lost the fight and Nationals Park was built as one of the most heavily publicly financed stadiums in the country.

In 2003, Lazere worked with DC Councilmember Jack Evans on legislation to close corporate loopholes in the city's tax code. Later that same year, Lazere supported the mayor's proposal for a temporary tax increase on D.C. residents earning more than $100,000.

Lazere has been a regular advocate on DC's annual budget. Among his progressive proposals are not dedicating a percentage of future revenue to fund capital projects, asking DC's universities to pay some kind of payment in lieu of taxes, taxing all new commercial property refinancings, and increasing the floor on property taxes.

=== Other positions ===
Lazere was Chair of the Public Education Finance Reform Commission in 2011-2012 and a member of the DC Tax Revision Commission in 2012–2013. He has served on other non-profit boards.

== Campaign for Council ==
In 2018, Lazere took leave from the DCFPI to run for Chairman of the Council of the District of Columbia, opposing incumbent Phil Mendelson. He said that the reason for his campaign was because DC was not responding forcefully enough to inequality, which has allowed homelessness to increase and affordable housing to diminish despite a period of economic expansion. Lazere made affordable housing an emphasis of his campaign, claiming that housing accounts for only 3 percent of DC's budget, but amounts to more than 3 percent of the city's problems.

Among his policy proposals, Lazere wants the DC Government to increase its research capacity. He called for lawmakers to look more at "best practices" across the country when considering legislation.

== Personal ==
Lazere resides in Brookland. He has a wife and two sons, who attended DC Public Schools.
