= District of Columbia Office of Campaign Finance =

The District of Columbia Office of Campaign Finance (OCF) exists as an agency inside the DC Board of Elections. The OCF monitors the actions of political campaigns, appointed officials and elected officials within the District of Columbia, in the United States. Areas of concern include: campaign finance, conflict of interest, lobbying, public officials' ethics and constituent services.

== OCF Structure ==
The OCF is divided into three divisions:

1. The Public Information and Record Management Division maintains records.
2. The Reports Analysis and Audit Division audits campaign reports.
3. The Office of the General Counsel provides interpretive opinions of the law and investigates suspected violations of the law.
