= Tenant Opportunity to Purchase Act =

District of Columbia tenant-purchase law

Council of the District of Columbia
- Long title: Tenant Opportunity to Purchase Act of 1980
- Citation: D.C. Law 3-86; 27 DCR 2975
- Territorial extent: District of Columbia
- Passed by: Council of the District of Columbia
- Passed: June 17, 1980
- Signed by: Mayor Marion Barry
- Signed: June 27, 1980
- Effective: September 10, 1980

Legislative history
- Bill title: Bill 3-222

Amends
- Rental Housing Act of 1977

The Tenant Opportunity to Purchase Act (TOPA), formally the Tenant Opportunity to Purchase Act of 1980, is a law of the District of Columbia that gives tenants an opportunity to purchase a rental housing accommodation before the owner sells it or issues certain notices to vacate for demolition or discontinuance of housing use. The act was adopted in 1980 as part of the District's response to condominium conversion, rental-housing loss, and tenant displacement. It is among the oldest and broadest tenant opportunity-to-purchase laws in the United States.

== History ==
An earlier tenant-purchase framework existed in the District by 1975, but TOPA was enacted in its modern form in 1980, following years of urban renewal, condominium conversion, and displacement pressures in Washington, D.C. The D.C. Council adopted the Rental Housing Conversion and Sale Act of 1980, including TOPA, on June 17, 1980. The act was signed by the mayor on June 27, 1980, transmitted to Congress for review under the District of Columbia Home Rule Act, and became effective on September 10, 1980.

TOPA originally gave tenants a collective right of first refusal to purchase their units or buildings when an owner sought to sell. In 1995, the law was amended to allow tenant associations to assign their purchase rights to housing providers, enabling TOPA to be used not only for resident ownership but also for preservation of rental housing. In 2005, the definition of a sale was broadened to include certain recapitalizations and internal ownership changes. In 2018, single-family homes were exempted from most TOPA requirements.

== Provisions ==
Under the D.C. Code, an owner of a housing accommodation generally must give tenants an opportunity to purchase before selling the property or issuing a notice to vacate for demolition or discontinuance of housing use. The law applies through a notice-and-response process in which tenants may accept an offer, negotiate terms, form a tenant organization, or assign purchase rights to another entity.

In multi-unit buildings, tenants may organize a tenant association to collectively exercise TOPA rights. A tenant association may attempt to buy the property directly or assign its rights to a third party, including a nonprofit or other housing provider, often in exchange for affordability commitments, repairs, relocation benefits, or other tenant protections.

The District of Columbia Department of Housing and Community Development administers assistance related to TOPA. The agency provides financial assistance, technical assistance, organizational support, document preparation, loan packaging, and other services to tenant groups seeking to purchase or preserve their buildings.

== Impact ==
Studies and policy analyses have described TOPA as a tool for preserving affordable housing and giving tenants leverage in property-sale negotiations. A 2023 study commissioned by the Council of the District of Columbia and released by the Coalition for Nonprofit Housing and Economic Development reported that 16,224 affordable units had been developed or preserved through TOPA and related tenant-purchase efforts.

TOPA outcomes remain difficult to measure due to limited public reporting, but TOPA and tenant-association formations were concentrated in smaller, older, rent-controlled buildings. The same report said that tenant purchases remain possible but rare, in part because financing is difficult and collective ownership is complex for tenant groups.

== Criticism and debate ==
Supporters argue that it gives tenants bargaining power, helps prevent displacement, and can preserve affordability when paired with financing and technical support. Critics argue that the law can delay sales, increase transaction costs, and apply too broadly to transactions where tenant purchase is unlikely.

In 2025, D.C. Law 26-80, the Rebalancing Expectations for Neighbors, Tenants, and Landlords Amendment Act of 2025, commonly known as the RENTAL Act, amended TOPA by reorganizing the act's provisions, clarifying the law's applicability to certain ownership changes, exempting new construction from TOPA for 15 years after construction, exempting certain covenanted affordable-housing projects, creating a system of certified tenant support providers, directing the Department of Housing and Community Development to maintain a public TOPA database, and making other procedural changes.

== Similar legislation elsewhere ==
TOPA laws, which give tenants a direct opportunity to purchase, and related right of first refusal or COPA models, which may prioritize qualified nonprofit organizations, public agencies, or tenant associations.

In San Francisco, the Community Opportunity to Purchase Act was enacted in 2019. The law gives qualified nonprofit organizations a right of first offer and right of first refusal for certain multifamily residential buildings offered for sale, with the goal of preserving them as permanently affordable housing.

In New York, state legislators introduced proposals during the 2025–2026 legislative session to establish a statewide tenant opportunity-to-purchase framework. An Assembly bill proposed applying the process to rental housing accommodations generally and giving tenant organizations and qualified purchasers a right of first offer and, in specified circumstances, a right of first refusal. A Senate proposal applied to rental housing accommodations with three or more units and provided tenant organizations and qualified purchasers with a right of first refusal.

In Chicago, the city has adopted geographically targeted tenant-purchase and preservation laws. The Woodlawn Housing Preservation Ordinance, adopted in 2020, created a tenant right of first refusal for certain larger apartment buildings in the Woodlawn area. In 2024, Chicago also adopted a Northwest Side Preservation Ordinance, later codified as a tenant opportunity-to-purchase pilot program for the 606 district, with timelines for tenants or tenant associations to respond to third-party purchase offers.

In Maryland, state law provides a tenant's right of first refusal when an owner seeks to sell residential rental property with three or fewer units. Local governments in Maryland also operate right-of-first-refusal programs. Montgomery County, Maryland, enacted a right-of-first-refusal law in 1980 under which the county, the Housing Opportunities Commission of Montgomery County, or a certified tenant organization must be offered an opportunity to purchase certain multifamily rental housing before sale to another party. In Prince George's County, Maryland, a county right-of-first-refusal program created in 2013 applies to multifamily rental properties of 20 or more units and is administered by the county Department of Housing and Community Development.

== See also ==
- Affordable housing
- Community land trust
- Housing cooperative
- Right of first refusal
- Tenants union
