= 2018 Council of the District of Columbia election =

US Election

- November 6, 2018

7 seats on the Council of the District of Columbia 7 seats needed for a majority
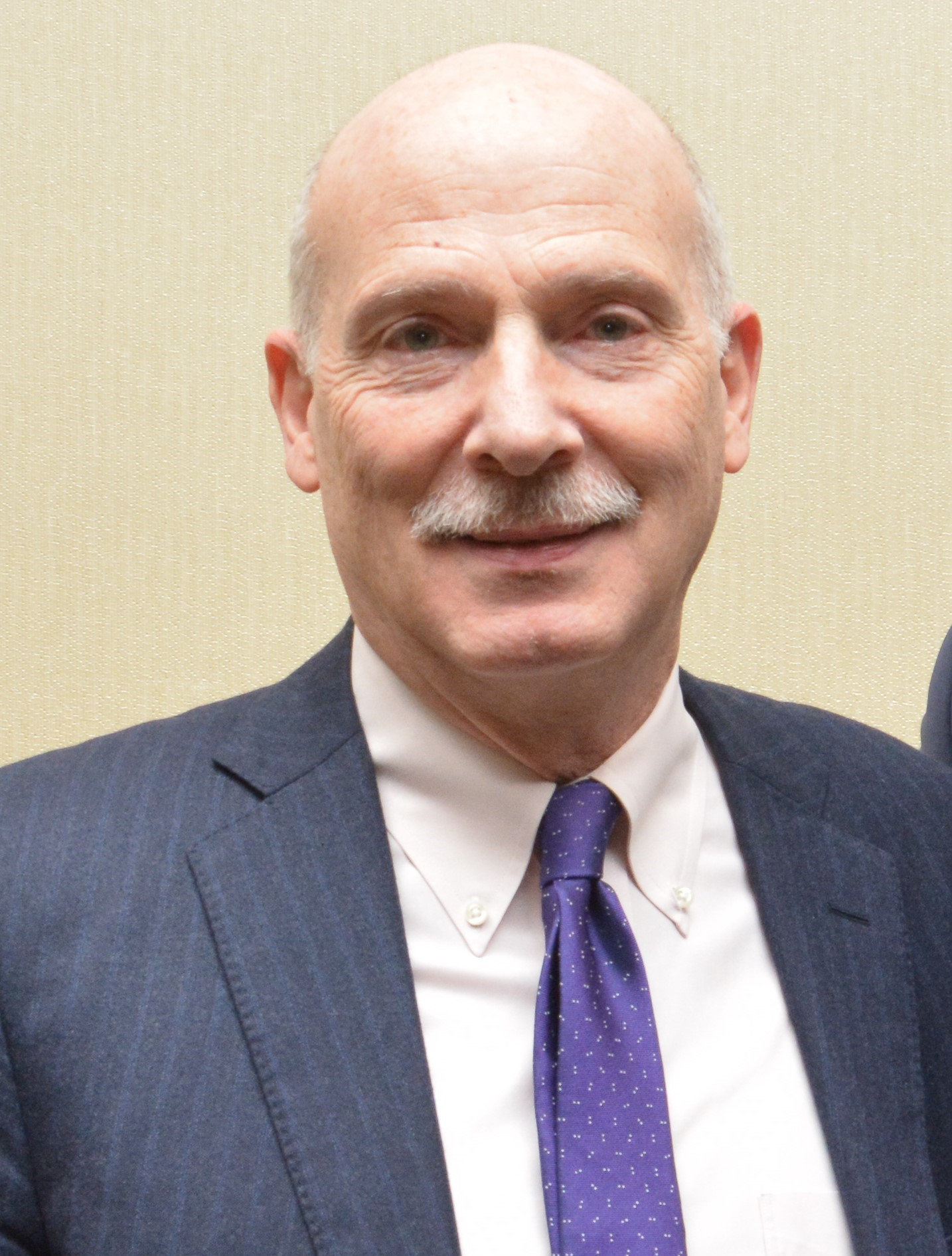

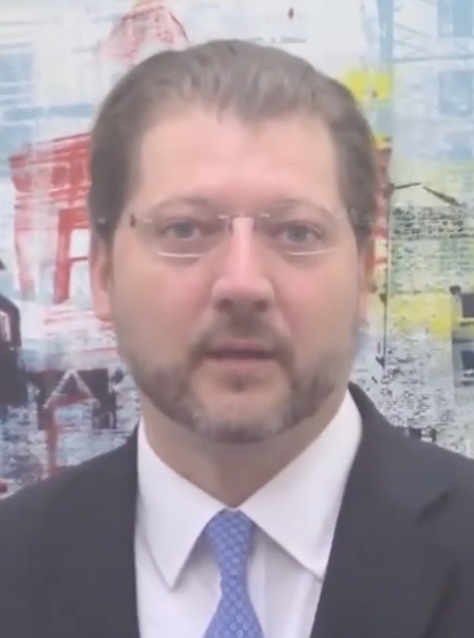
	Majority party	Minority party
Leader	Phil Mendelson	David Grosso
Party	Democratic	Independent
Last election	11	2
Seats after	11	2
Seat change	Steady	Steady
Chair of the Council before election
Phil Mendelson
Democratic
Elected Chair of the Council
Phil Mendelson
Democratic

The 2018 Council of the District of Columbia election was held on November 6, 2018, with primary elections held on June 19th. Elections were held in four of the wards, two at-large seats and for the Chair of the Council of the District of Columbia. Prior to the election, 11 seats were held by Democrats and 2 seats were held by Independents. The general election saw no party flip any seats, thereby meaning that Democrats retained their majority on the council.

== Chairperson ==
2018 District of Columbia Chairperson of the Council Election
- November 6, 2018
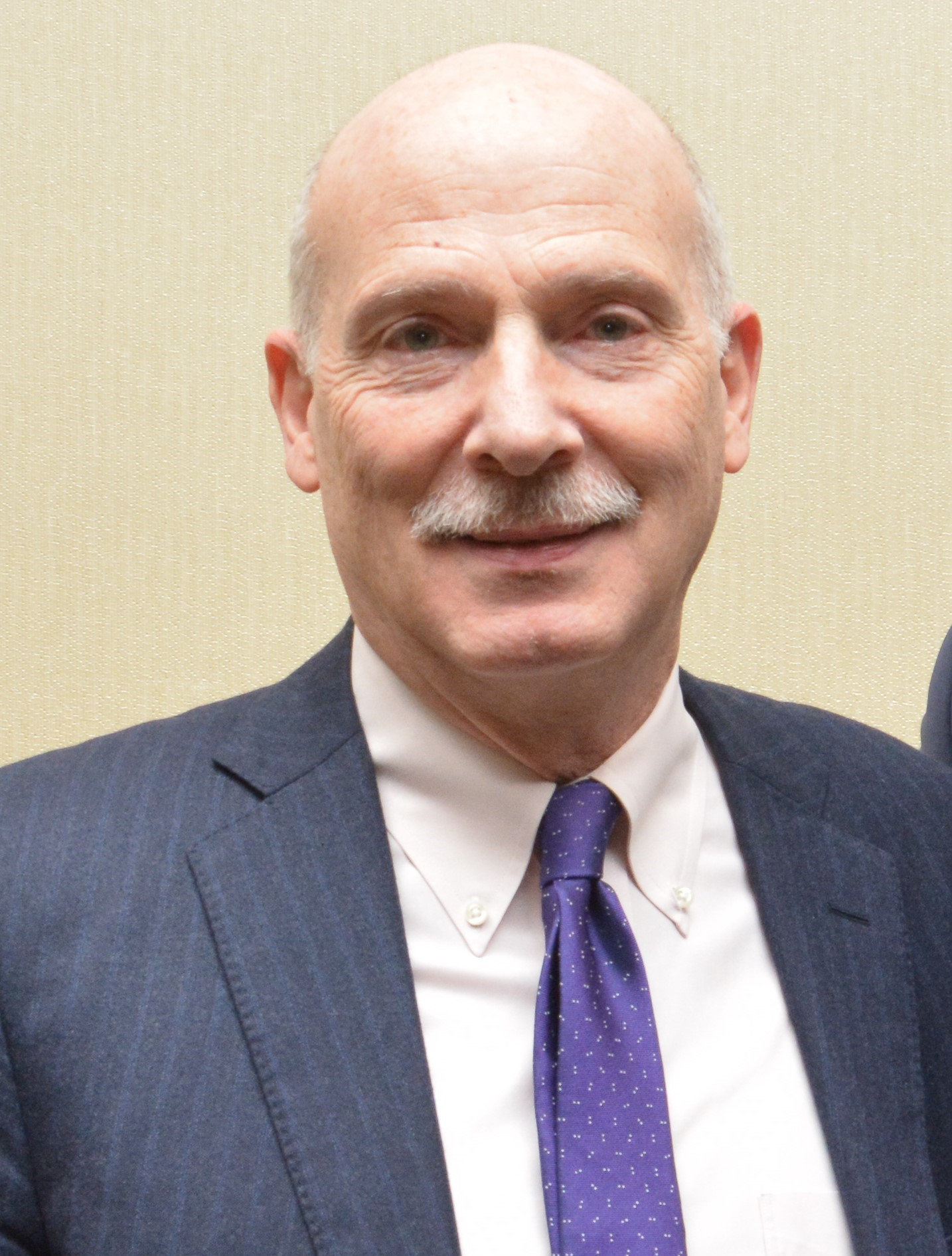

	Majority party	Minority party
Candidate	Phil Mendelson	Ethan Bishop-Henchman
Party	Democratic	Libertarian
Popular vote	198,639	18,708
Percentage	89.13%	8.39%
Chairperson before election
Phil Mendelson
Democratic
Elected Chairperson
Phil Mendelson
Democratic

Incumbent Phil Mendelson secured reelection. In the primary, Mendelson was challenged from the left by Ed Lazere, the longtime director of the DC Fiscal Policy Institute.

=== Democratic primary ===
Candidates

- Ed Lazere, think tank executive and progressive activist
- Phil Mendelson, incumbent chairman (2012–present)

Disqualified

- Calvin Gurley, accountant and perennial candidate

Endorsements

Ed Lazere

Labor unions

- Washington Teachers' Union

Organizations

- 350 DC
- DC for Democracy
- Democracy for America
- Jews United for Justice
- MoveOn
- National Organization for Women
Phil Mendelson

Labor unions

- AFL-CIO Metropolitan Washington Council
- SEIU local 32BJ

Organizations

- Capital Stonewall Democrats
- Democrats for Education Reform
- Sierra Club

Publications

- The Washington Post

Debates

Debates and forums for Chairperson Democratic primary candidates
Date	Place	Host	Participants		
P Participant. I Invitee. A Absent. N Confirmed non-invitee. O Out of race (exploring, suspended, or not yet entered)			Gurley	Lazere	Mendelson
6 February 2018	Whittemore House	Woman's National Democratic Club	P	P	P
5 June 2018	Thurgood Marshall Center	Coalition for DC Public Schools and Communities	O	P	P

2018 Council of the District of Columbia Chairperson Democratic primary
Party	Candidate	Votes	%
Democratic	Phil Mendelson	48,848	63%
Democratic	Ed Lazere	28,280	36.5%
Write-in		384	0.5%
Total votes		77,128	100.0

=== Libertarian primary ===
Candidates

- Ethan Bishop-Henchman, business consultant

=== General election ===
2018 Council of the District of Columbia Chairperson election
Party	Candidate	Votes	%
Democratic	Phil Mendelson	198,639	89.1%
Libertarian	Ethan Bishop-Henchman	18,708	8.4%
Write-in		5,516	2.5%
Total votes		222,863	100.0

== At-large ==
2018 Council of the District of Columbia At-Large Election
- November 6, 2018
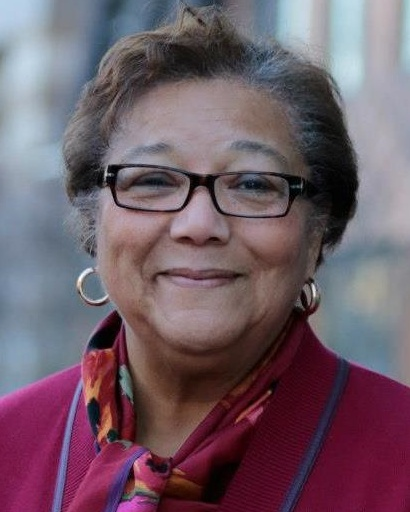

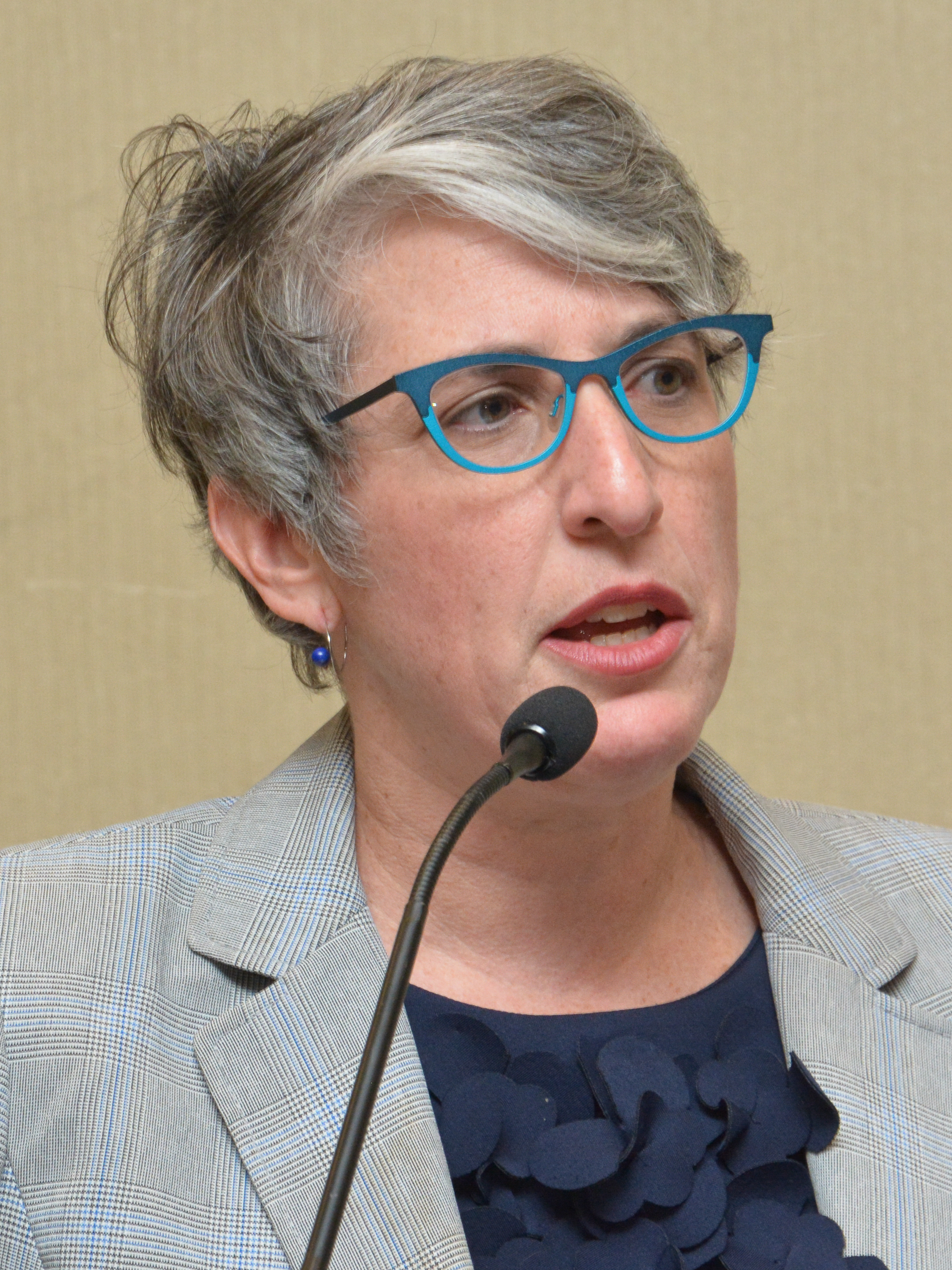

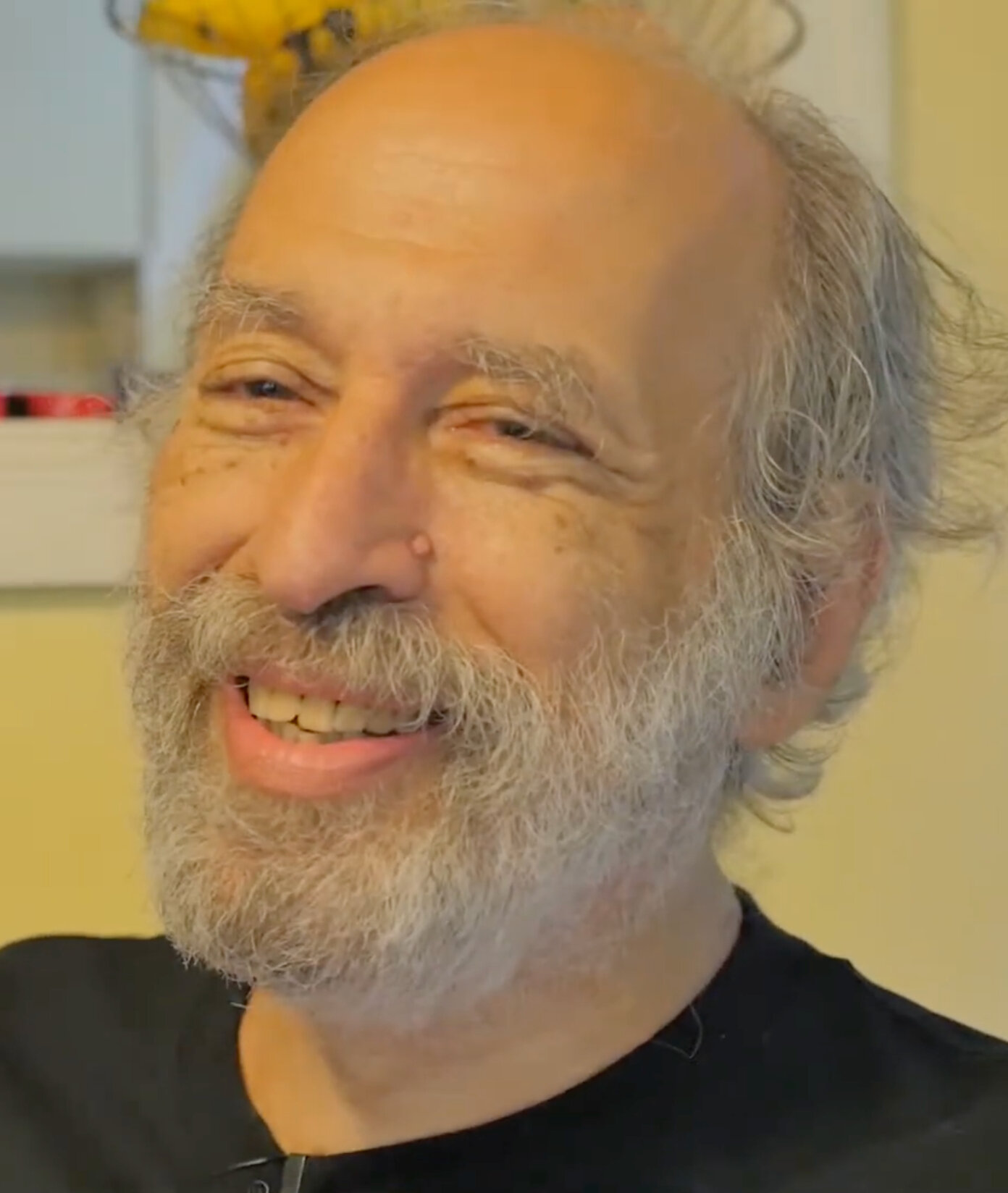

	Majority party	Minority party	Third party
Candidate	Anita Bonds	Elissa Silverman	Dionne Reeder
Party	Democratic	Independent	Independent
Popular vote	152,460	90,589	49,132
Percentage	44.55%	26.47%	14.36%
	Fourth party	Fifth party	Sixth party
Candidate	David Schwartzman	Ralph Chittams, Sr.	Rustin Lewis
Party	DC Statehood Green	Republican	Independent
Popular vote	26,006	12,629	8,463
Percentage	7.6%	3.69%	2.47%
At-large councilmember before election
Anita Bonds (D)
Elissa Silverman (I)
Elected At-large councilmember
Anita Bonds (D)
Elissa Silverman (I)

Incumbents Anita Bonds and Elissa Silverman successfully secured reelection. In the Democratic primary, Bonds received two challenges from Jeremiah Lowery and Marcus Goodwin, respectively. Although Silverman, an independent, does not run in a primary, pundits viewed Dionne Reeder's candidacy as a challenge to the progressive incumbent. Business groups initially backed S. Kathryn Allen, a real estate attorney, to challenge Silverman, before she was nixed from the ballot by the District of Columbia Board of Elections. These groups, along with incumbent mayor Muriel Bowser, transferred their support to Reeder. In November, Silverman dislodged the challenge from the moderate Reeder.

=== Democratic primary ===
Candidates

- Anita Bonds, incumbent at-large councilmember (2012–present)
- Marcus Goodwin, real estate developer
- Jeremiah Lowery, activist and organizer

Disqualified

- Aaron Holmes, communications professional and candidate for Ward 8 councilmember in 2016

Endorsements

Anita Bonds

Labor unions

- Washington Teachers' Union

Local officials

- Karl Racine, Attorney General of the District of Columbia (2015-present) (co-endorsement with Silverman)
Marcus Goodwin

Publications

- The Washington Post
Jeremiah Lowery

Labor unions

- SEIU 32BJ

Organizations

- DC for Democracy
- Greater Greater Washington
- Jews United for Justice
- Run for Something
- Sierra Club

Debates

Debates and forums for At-large Democratic primary candidates
Date	Place	Host	Participants			
P Participant. I Invitee. A Absent. N Confirmed non-invitee. O Out of race (exploring, suspended, or not yet entered)			Bonds	Goodwin	Holmes	Lowery
6 February 2018	Whittemore House	Woman's National Democratic Club	A	P	P	P
4 June 2018	St. Columba's Episcopal Church	Ward 3 Democrats	P	P	O	P
5 June 2018	Thurgood Marshall Center	Coalition for DC Public Schools and Communities	P	P	O	P

2018 Council of the District of Columbia At-large Democratic primary
Party	Candidate	Votes	%
Democratic	Anita Bonds	39,351	52.46%
Democratic	Jeremiah Lowery	17,688	23.58%
Democratic	Marcus Goodwin	419	23.22%
Write-in		552	0.74%
Total votes		75,010	100.0

=== Independents ===
Candidates

- Elissa Silverman, incumbent at-large councilmember (2015–present)
- Rustin Lewis, non-profit executive and educator
- Dionne Reeder, restauranteur

Disqualified

- S. Kathryn Allen, real estate attorney

Declined

- Yvette Alexander, former member of the Council of the District of Columbia from Ward 7 (2007-2015)

Endorsements

Dionne Reeder

Individuals

- Cora Masters Barry, widow of former mayor and Ward 8 councilmember Marion Barry
- Marie Johns, former deputy administrator of the Small Business Administration and Democratic candidate for mayor in 2010

Labor unions

- AFSCME District Council 20

Local officials

- Angela Alsobrooks, County Executive of Prince George's County, Maryland (2018-present) and former state's attorney of Prince George's County
- Muriel Bowser, mayor of the District of Columbia (2015-present)
- Bill Lightfoot, former at-large member of the Council of the District of Columbia (1989-1997)

Publications

- The Washington Post
Elissa Silverman

Labor unions

- Metropolitan Washington AFL-CIO
- IBEW Local 26
- LiUNA Local 400
- SEIU 32BJ
- United Food and Commercial Workers locals 27 and 400
- Washington Teachers' Union

Local officials

- Charles Allen, member of the Council of the District of Columbia from Ward 6
- Mary Cheh, member of the Council of the District of Columbia from Ward 3 (2007-present)
- David Grosso, at-large member of the Council of the District of Columbia (2013-present)
- Brianne Nadeau, member of the Council of the District of Columbia from Ward 1 (2015-present)
- Karl Racine, Attorney General of the District of Columbia (2015-present) (co-endorsement with Bonds)

Organizations

- DC for Democracy
- Greater Greater Washington
- Jews United for Justice
- National Nurses United
- Sierra Club

=== General election ===
2018 Council of the District of Columbia At-large election
Party	Candidate	Votes	%
Democratic	Anita Bonds (incumbent)	152,460	44.55%
Independent	Elissa Silverman (incumbent)	90,589	26.47%
Independent	Dionne Reeder	49,132	14.36%
DC Statehood Green	David Schwartzman	26,006	7.60%
Republican	Ralph J. Chittams Sr.	12,629	3.69%
Independent	Rustin M. Lewis	8,463	2.47%
Write-in		2,909	0.85%
Total votes		342,188	100.0%

== Ward 1 ==
2018 District of Columbia Ward 1 Councilmember Election
- November 6, 2018
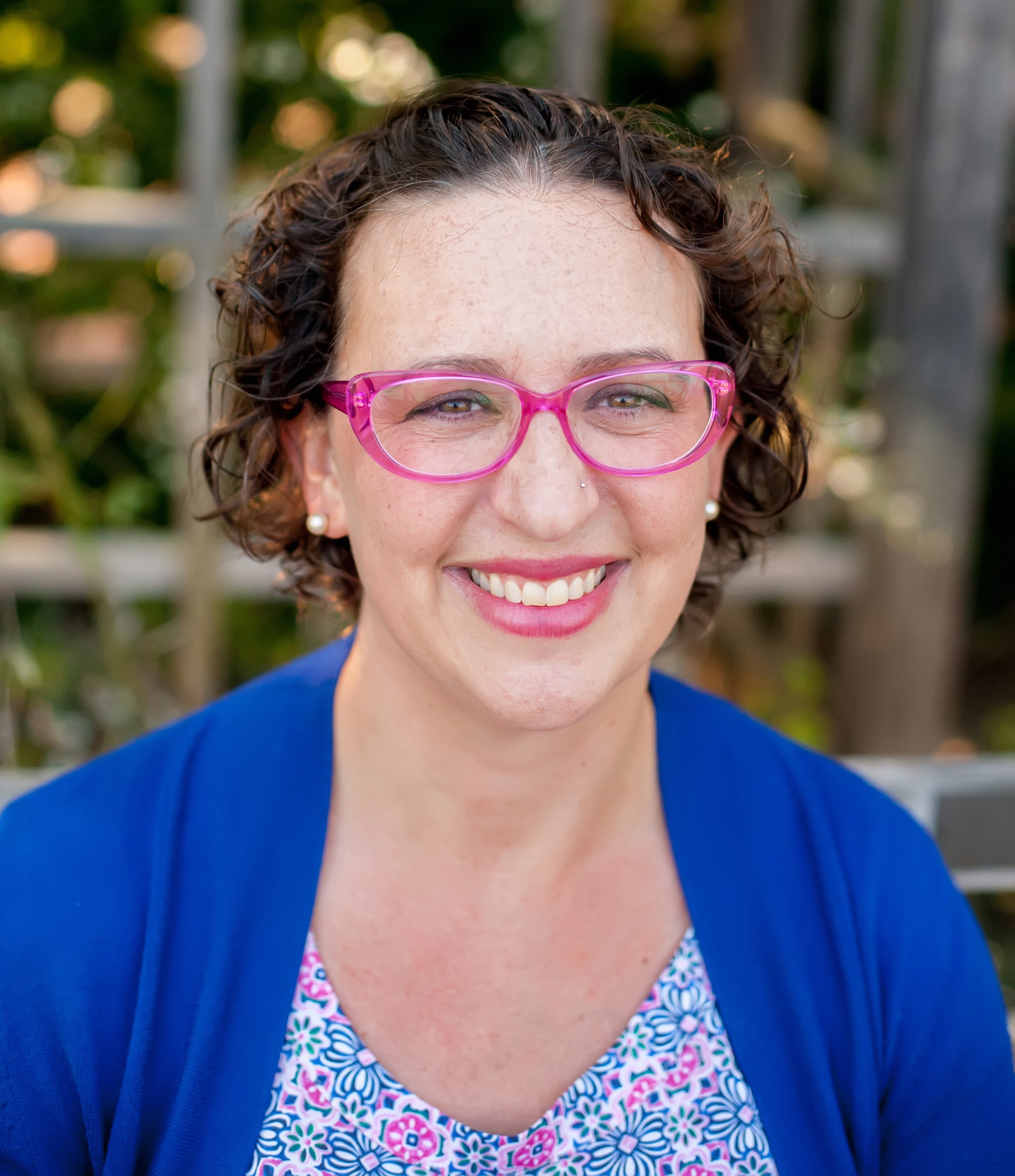

	Majority party	Minority party
Candidate	Brianne Nadeau	Jamie Sycamore
Party	Democratic	Independent
Popular vote	23,283	6,230
Percentage	78.23%	20.93%
Councilmember before election
Brianne Nadeau
Democratic
Elected Councilmember
Brianne Nadeau
Democratic

Incumbent Brianne Nadeau secured a second term on the Council. In 2014, Nadeau had unseated longtime councilmember Jim Graham, riding a flurry of corruption scandals that tarnished Graham's reputation. In her bid for reelection, Nadeau, a progressive, faced librarian and ANC commissioner Kent Boese, real estate consultant Sheika Reid, and former magistrate judge Lori Parker in the Democratic primary. In the general election, she defeated independent Jamie Sycamore, an ASL interpreter who raised concerns about Nadeau's constituent services operation in comparison to that of Jim Graham.

=== Democratic primary ===
Candidates

- Kent Boese, chair of ANC 1A
- Brianne Nadeau, incumbent councilmember (2015–present)
- Lori Parker, former Superior Court of the District of Columbia magistrate judge
- Sheika Reid, Sotheby's real estate consultant and urban planner

Endorsements

Kent Boese

Organizations

- Capital Stonewall Democrats
- LGBTQ Victory Fund
Brianne Nadeau

Labor unions

- Washington Teachers' Union

Organizations

- Greater Greater Washington
- Sierra Club

Publications

- The Washington Post
Lori Parker

Organizations

- Washington Teachers' Union
Sheika Reid

Labor unions

- American Federation of State, County and Municipal Employees local 20

2018 Council of the District of Columbia Ward 1 Democratic primary
Party	Candidate	Votes	%
Democratic	Brianne Nadeau (incumbent)	5,537	48.28%
Democratic	Kent Boese	2,876	25.08%
Democratic	Sheika Reid	1,533	13.37%
Democratic	Lori Parker	1,485	12.95%
Write-in		37	0.32%
Total votes		11,468	100.0%

=== Independents ===
Candidates

- Jamie Sycamore, sign language interpreter

Withdrawn

- Greg Boyd, former DCPS teacher

=== General election ===
2018 Council of the District of Columbia Ward 1 election
Party	Candidate	Votes	%
Democratic	Brianne Nadeau (incumbent)	23,283	78.23%
Independent	Jamie Sycamore	6,230	20.93%
Write-in		248	0.84%
Total votes		29,761	100.0%

== Ward 3 ==
2018 District of Columbia Ward 3 Councilmember Election
- November 6, 2018
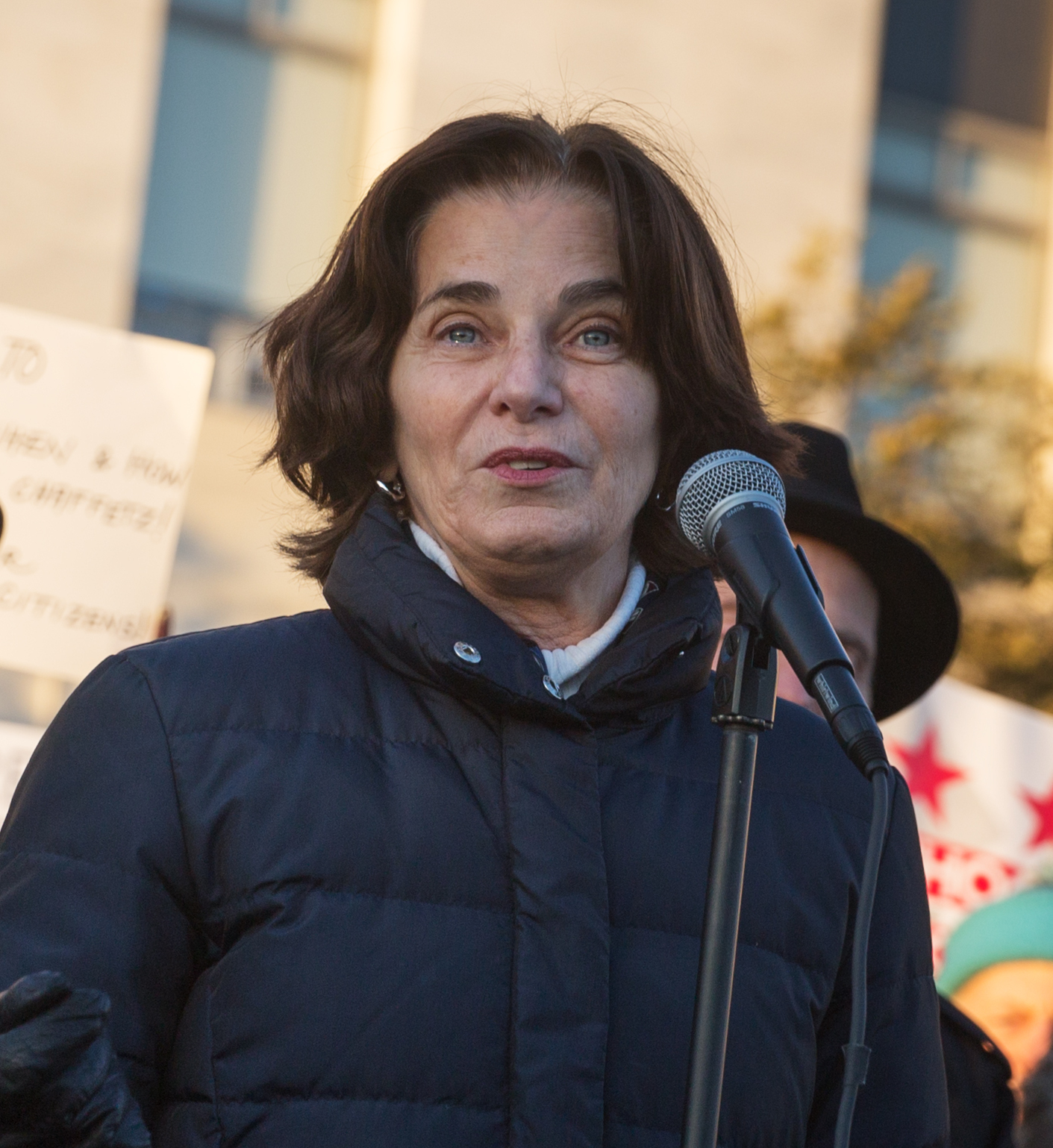

	Majority party	Minority party
Candidate	Mary Cheh	Petar Dimtchev
Party	Democratic	Independent
Popular vote	23,443	7,946
Percentage	74.18%	25.14%
Councilmember before election
Mary Cheh
Democratic
Elected Councilmember
Mary Cheh
Democratic

Incumbent Mary Cheh sought a fourth term representing Ward 3, the council distract that primarily covers the upper half of the Northwest quadrant. Cheh was unopposed in the Democratic primary and faced attorney and former mayoral aide Petar Dimtchev in the general election.

=== Democratic primary ===
Candidates

- Mary Cheh, incumbent councilmember (2007–present)

Endorsements

Mary Cheh

Labor unions

- Washington Teachers' Union

Organizations

- Capital Stonewall Democrats
- Greater Greater Washington
- Sierra Club

2018 Council of the District of Columbia Ward 3 Democratic primary
Party	Candidate	Votes	%
Democratic	Mary Cheh (incumbent)	10,011	94.95%
Write-in		532	5.05%
Total votes		10,543	100.0%

=== Independents ===
Candidates

- Petar Dimtchev, Social Security Administration attorney and former mayoral aide to Adrian Fenty

Endorsements

Petar Dimtchev

Publications

- The Washington Post

=== General election ===
Debates

Debates and forums for Ward 3 candidates
Date	Place	Host	Participants	
P Participant. I Invitee. A Absent. N Confirmed non-invitee. O Out of race (exploring, suspended, or not yet entered)			Cheh	Dimtchev
2 October 2018	Palisades Neighborhood Library	Palisades Citizens Association	P	P
25 October 2018	Cleveland Park Neighborhood Library	Cleveland Park Citizens Association	P	P

2018 Council of the District of Columbia Ward 3 election
Party	Candidate	Votes	%
Democratic	Mary Cheh (incumbent)	23,443	74.18%
Independent	Petar A. Dimtchev	7,946	25.14%
Write-in		215	0.68%
Total votes		31,604	100.0%

== Ward 5 ==
2018 District of Columbia Ward 5 Councilmember Election
- November 6, 2018
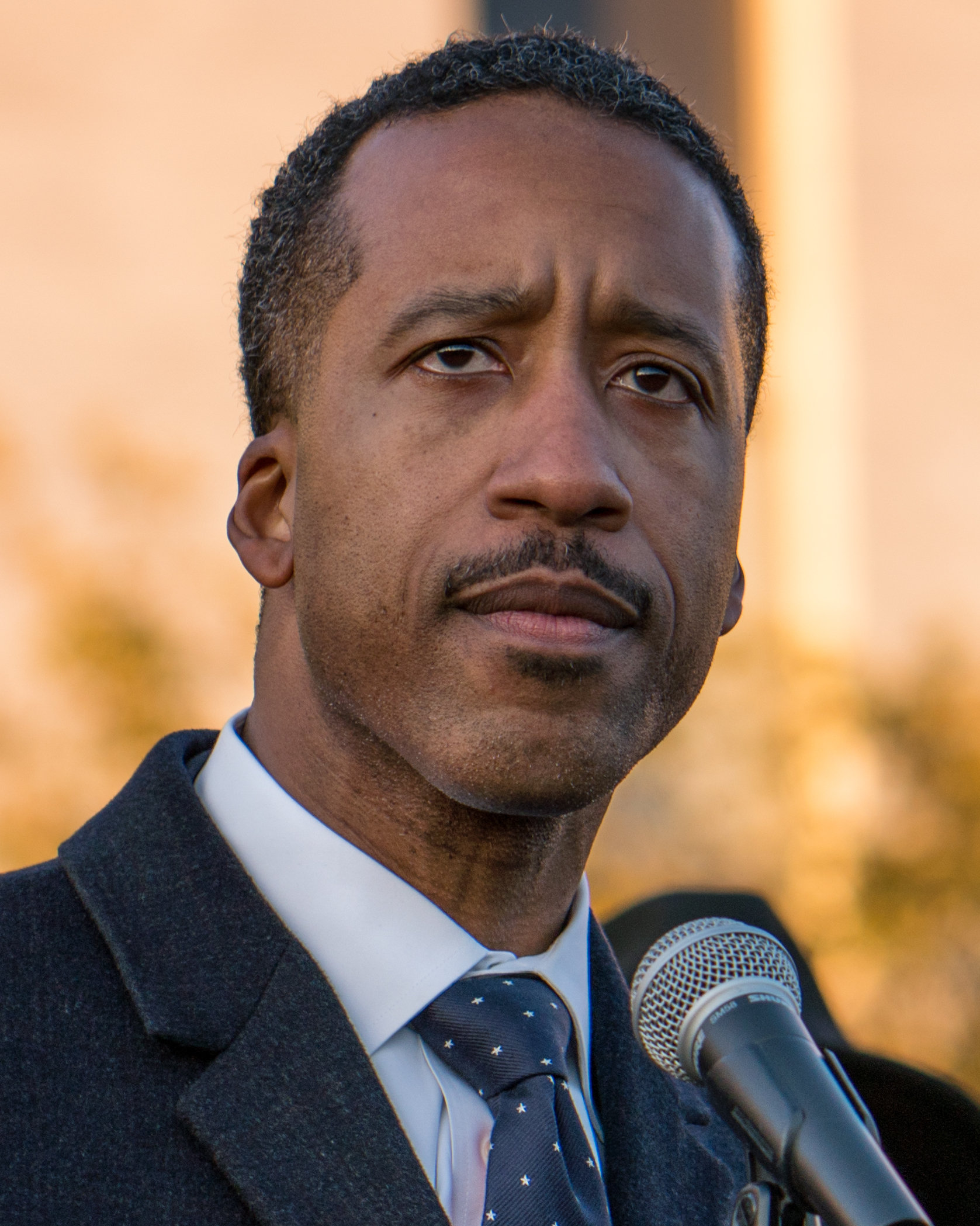

	Majority party	Minority party
Candidate	Kenyan McDuffie	Kathy Henderson
Party	Democratic	Independent
Popular vote	23,745	2,523
Percentage	79.28%	8.42%
	Third party	Fourth party
Candidate	Joyce Robinson-Paul	Amone Banks
Party	D.C. Statehood Green Party	Independent
Popular vote	2,085	1,085
Percentage	6.96%	3.62%
Councilmember before election
Kenyan McDuffie
Democratic
Elected Councilmember
Kenyan McDuffie
Democratic

Kenyan McDuffie sought a second full term representing Ward 5. McDuffie, fresh off a failed recall effort that never reached the ballot, bested five fellow Democrats in the primary. McDuffie secured a second term in the November general election.

=== Democratic primary ===
Candidates

- Gayle Hall Carley, ANC commissioner from 5B02
- Nestor Djonkam, businessman and perennial candidate
- LaMonica Jeffrey, community activist
- Kenyan McDuffie, incumbent councilmember (2012–present)
- Bradley Thomas, chair of ANC 5E

Endorsements

Kenyan McDuffie

Labor unions

- Washington Teachers' Union

Organizations

- Capital Stonewall Democrats
- Democrats for Education Reform
- Greater Greater Washington
- Jews United for Justice
- Sierra Club

Publications

- The Washington Post

2018 Council of the District of Columbia Ward 5 Democratic primary
Party	Candidate	Votes	%
Democratic	Kenyan McDuffie (incumbent)	7,737	66.08%
Democratic	Gayle Hall Carley	1,668	14.25%
Democratic	Bradley Thomas	1,373	11.73%
Democratic	LaMonica Jeffrey	314	2.68%
Democratic	Nestor Djonkam	55	0.47%
Write-in		563	4.81%
Total votes		11,710	100.0%

=== Independents ===
Candidates

- Amone Banks, federal employee
- Kathy Henderson, ANC commissioner from 5D06

=== DC Statehood Green primary ===
Candidates

- Joyce Robinson-Paul, community activist

2018 Council of the District of Columbia Ward 5 Statehood Green primary
Party	Candidate	Votes	%
DC Statehood Green	Joyce Robinson-Paul	36	76.6%
DC Statehood Green	Write-in	11	23.4
Total votes		47	100%

=== General election ===
2018 Council of the District of Columbia Ward 5 election
Party	Candidate	Votes	%
Democratic	Kenyan McDuffie (incumbent)	23,745	79.28%
Independent	Kathy Henderson	2,523	8.42%
DC Statehood Green	Joyce Robinson-Paul	2,085	6.96%
Independent	Amone Banks	1,085	3.62%
Write-in		513	1.71%
Total votes		29,951	100.0%

== Ward 6 ==
2018 District of Columbia Ward 6 Councilmember Election
- November 6, 2018
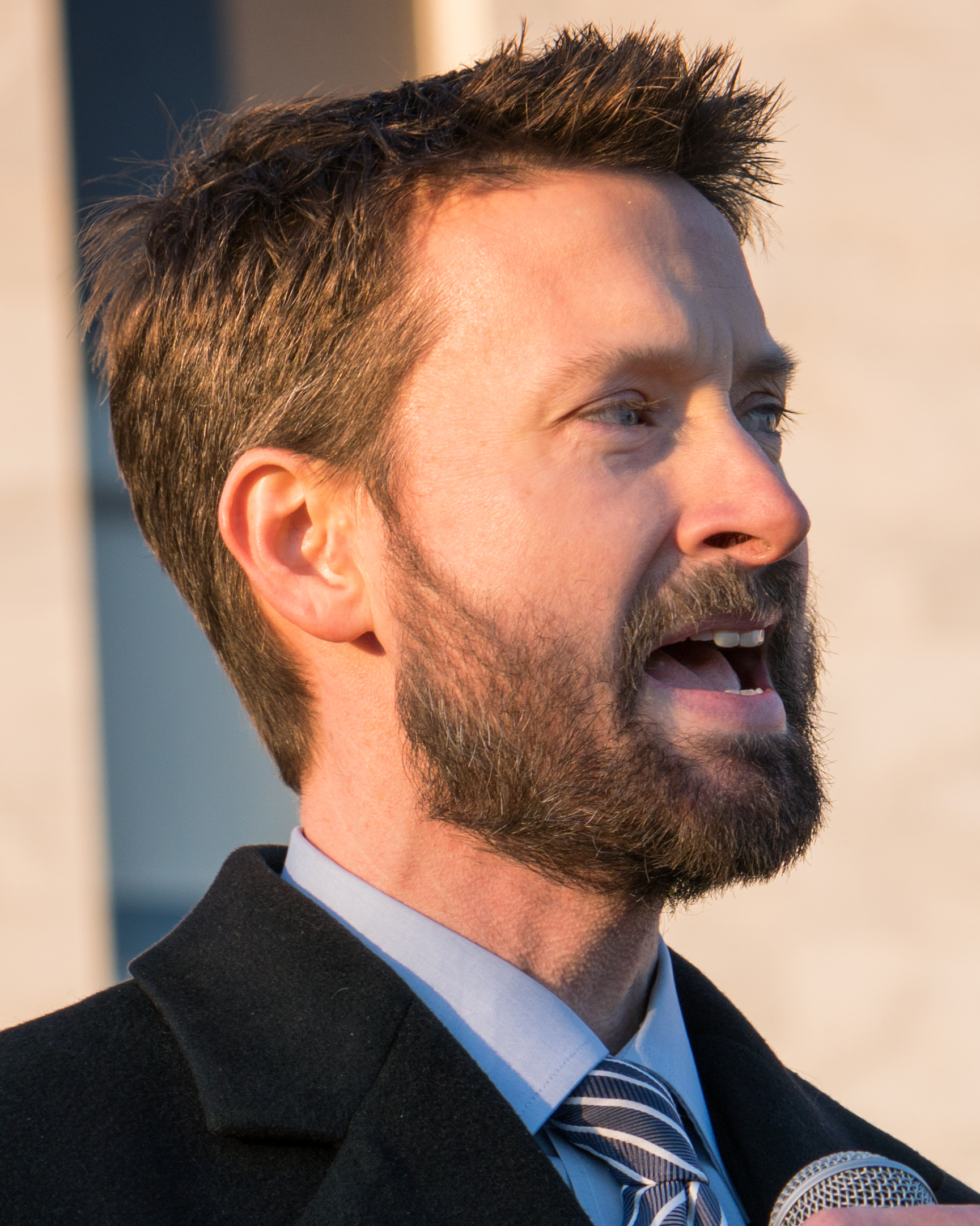

	Majority party	Minority party
Candidate	Charles Allen	Michael Bekesha
Party	Democratic	Republican
Popular vote	35,780	4,298
Percentage	88.30%	10.61%
Councilmember before election
Charles Allen
Democratic
Elected Councilmember
Charles Allen
Democratic

Charles Allen sought a second full term representing Ward 6. Allen faced a primary challenge from Democrat Lisa Hunter, and won handily following a relatively vitriolic campaign. Allen secured a second term in the November general election.

=== Democratic primary ===
Candidates

- Charles Allen, incumbent councilmember (2015–present)
- Lisa Hunter, former United States Department of Health and Human Services official

Endorsements

Charles Allen

Labor unions

- LiUNA Mid-Atlantic Region
- SEIU locals 32BJ, 500, 722, 1199
- Washington Teachers' Union

Local officials

- Sharon Ambrose, former Ward 6 Councilmember (1997-2007)
- David Grosso, incumbent At-large Councilmember
- Lisa Raymond, former Ward 6 member of the District of Columbia State Board of Education
- Monica Warren-Jones, incumbent Ward 6 member of the District of Columbia State Board of Education
- Tommy Wells, former Ward 6 Councilmember (2007-2015)

Organizations

- Capital Stonewall Democrats
- DC Association of Realtors
- DC for Democracy
- District of Columbia Chamber of Commerce
- Greater Greater Washington
- Jews United for Justice
- National Organization for Women
- Sierra Club

Publications

- Washington City Paper
- The Washington Post
Lisa Hunter

Organizations

- Run for Something

Debates

Debates and forums for Ward 6 Democratic primary candidates
Date	Place	Host	Participants		
P Participant. I Invitee. A Absent. N Confirmed non-invitee. O Out of race (exploring, suspended, or not yet entered)			Allen	Bekesha (Note: Due to District of Columbia general elections being overwhelmingly dominated by the Democratic party, some notionally partisan forums invite candidates from other political parties to give them a chance to speak and engage with Democratic candidates.)	Hunter
30 April 2018	Hill Center	Hill Rag	P	P	P
5 June 2018	Westminster Presbyterian Church SW	Hill Rag	P	P	P

2018 Council of the District of Columbia Ward 6 Democratic primary
Party	Candidate	Votes	%
Democratic	Charles Allen (incumbent)	9,802	67.98%
Democratic	Lisa Hunter	4,569	31.69%
Write-in		47	0.33%
Total votes		14,418	100.0%

=== Republican primary ===
Candidates

- Michael Bekesha, Judicial Watch attorney

=== General election ===
2018 Council of the District of Columbia Ward 6 election
Party	Candidate	Votes	%
Democratic	Charles Allen (incumbent)	35,780	88.30%
Republican	Michael Bekesha	4,298	10.61%
Write-in		442	1.09%
Total votes		40,520	100.0%
