= 2013 Council of the District of Columbia special election =

- April 23, 2013
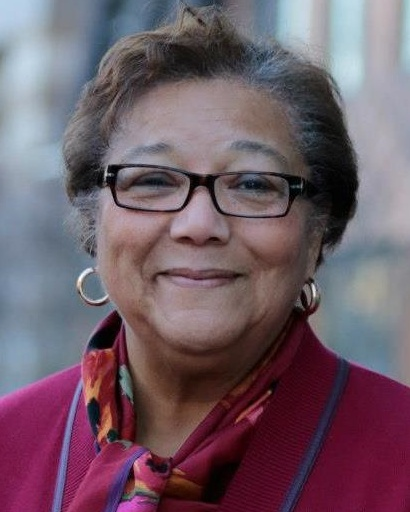

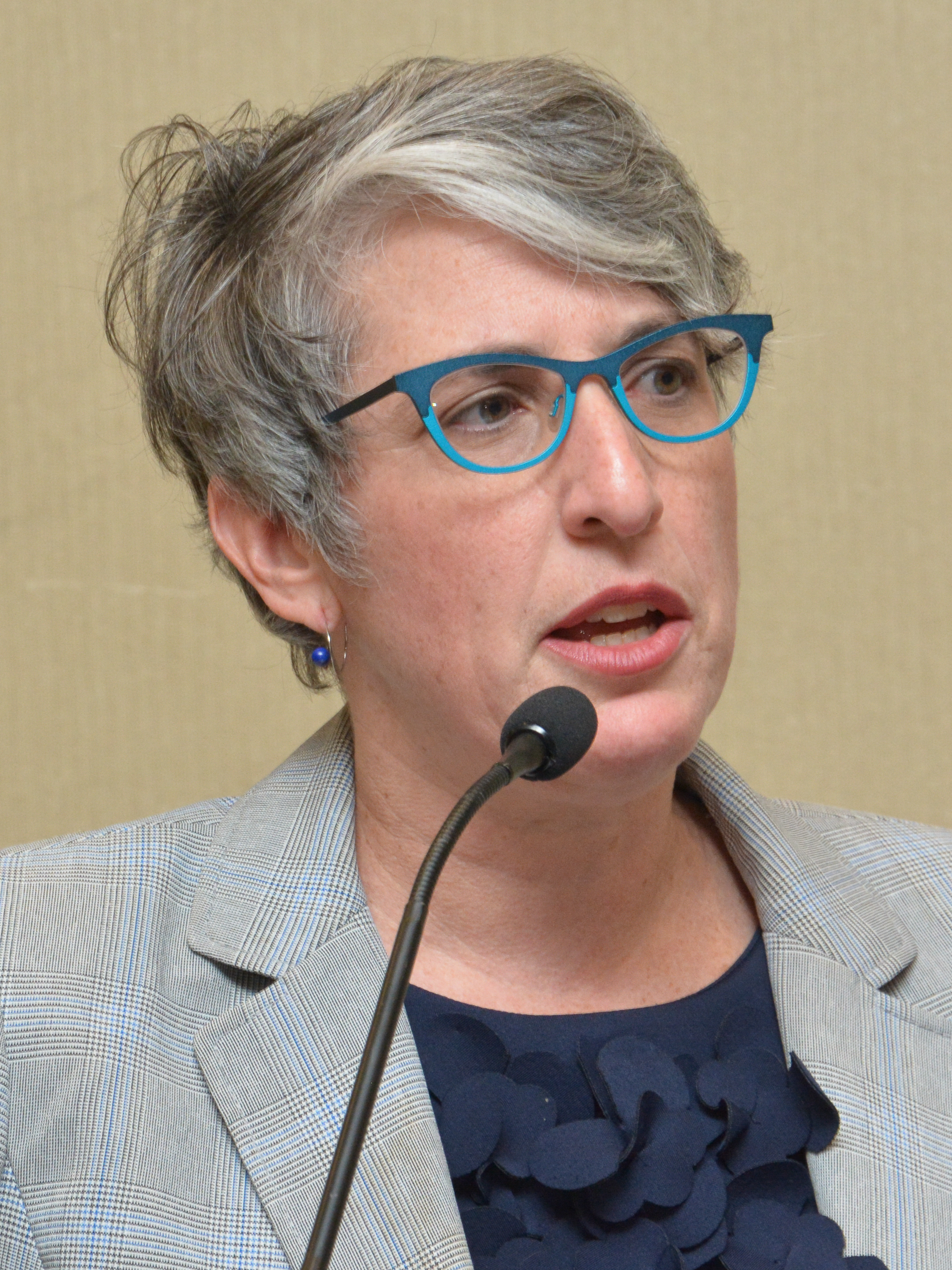

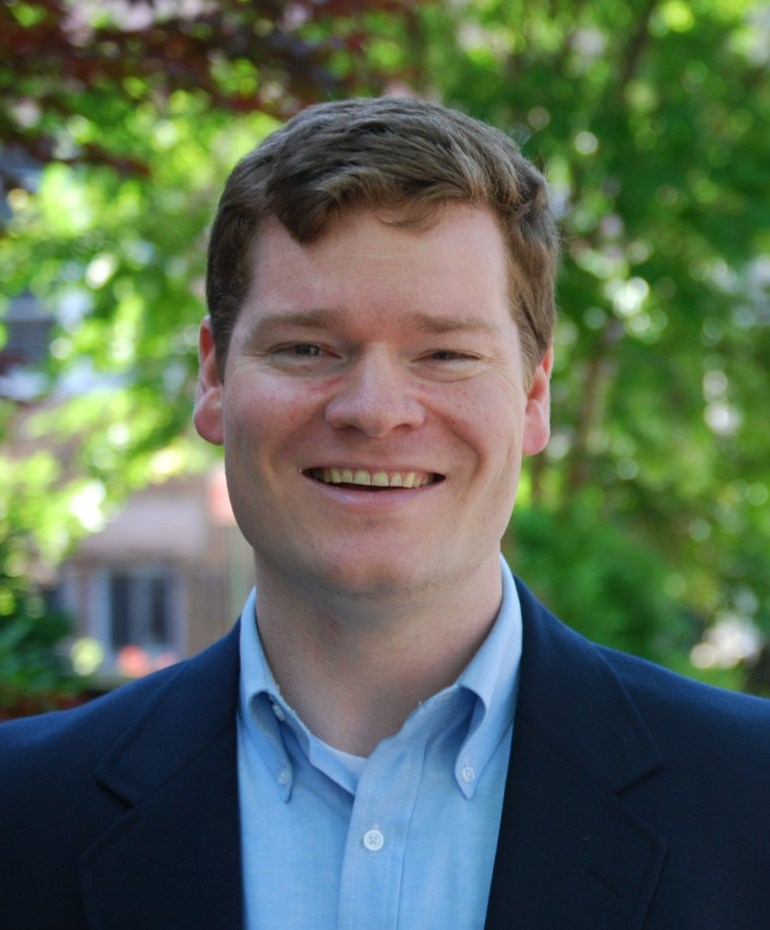

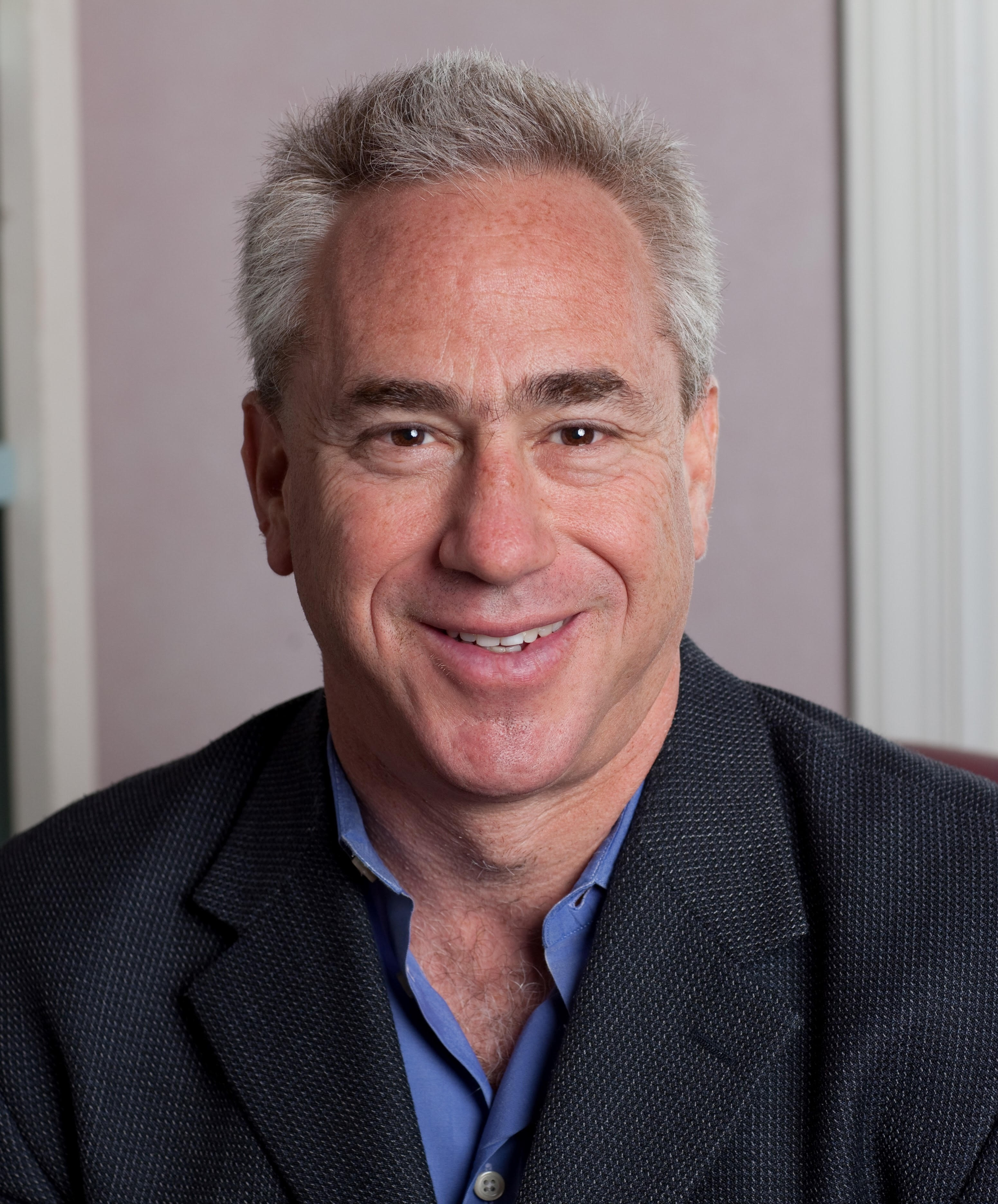

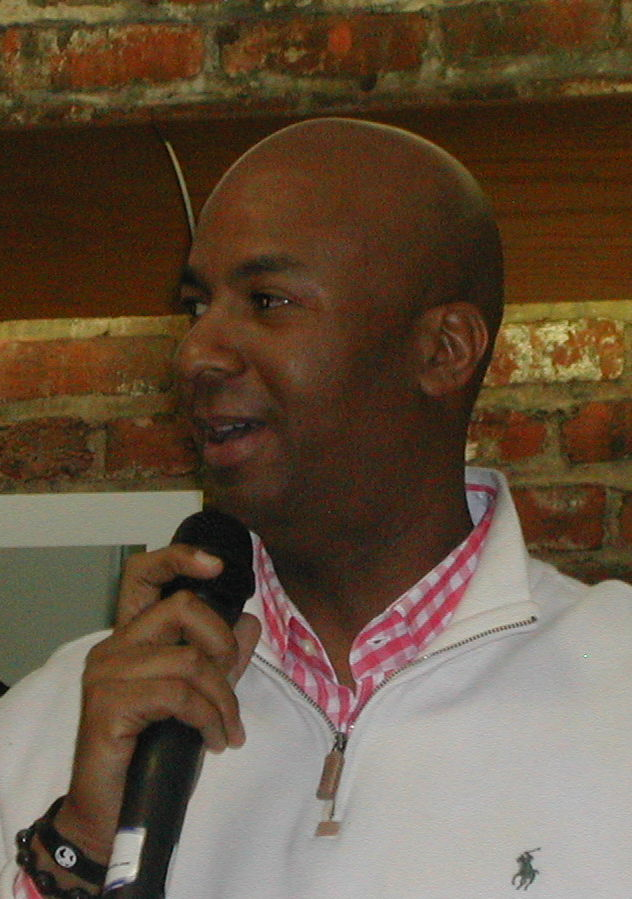
Candidate	Anita Bonds	Elissa Silverman	Patrick Mara
Party	Democratic	Democratic	Republican
Popular vote	18,027	15,228	13,698
Percentage	31.7%	26.8%	24.1%
Candidate	Matthew Frumin	Paul Zukerberg	Michael A. Brown
Party	Democratic	Democratic	Democratic
Popular vote	6,307	1,195	1,100
Percentage	11.1%	2.1%	1.9%
Councilmember before election
Anita Bonds
(interim)
Democratic
Elected Councilmember
Anita Bonds
Democratic

The 2013 Council of the District of Columbia special election was held on April 23, 2013 to elect one at-large member to the Council of the District of Columbia. Interim councilmember Anita Bonds was appointed to the position by the District of Columbia Democratic State Committee following the resignation of Phil Mendelson who became chairman of the Council in the 2012 elections.

Multiple candidates challenged Bonds in the open, all-party special election. The race essentially boiled down to the moderate Bonds, the interim councilmember, the progressive ex-journalist and budget wonk, Elissa Silverman, and the moderate Republican member of the District of Columbia State Board of Education, Patrick Mara. Silverman, who had previously courted the endorsement of Matt Frumin fearing Democratic candidates would split the vote and therefore grant Mara a path to victory, represented the city's influxn of younger, newer, and more progressive voters.

Bonds eventually placed first, winning Wards 4, 5, 6, and 7, the city council districts with electorates dominated by Black voters. Silverman placed second, winning a substantial share of votes in the rapidly-gentrifying Ward 1 and edging out Mara in her home Ward 6. Mara placed third though put up a respectable showing for a Republican in one of the nation's most liberal cities; he won Wards 2 and 3.

== Background ==
Incumbent councilmember Phil Mendelson was first elected to the Council in 1998 with 37% of the vote alongside David Catania after narrowly winning a majority of votes in a 10-way Democratic primary. Mendelson was reelected in 2002, 2006, and 2010, all with significant primary opposition. In 2012, after Kwame Brown announced his resignation as Council chair, Mendelson's colleagues named him the next chairman. He resigned from his at-large seat, prompting the District of Columbia Democratic State Committee to appoint a successor.

=== Applied to be appointed ===
In total, 3 individuals submitted applications for Mendelson's seat, namely:

- Anita Bonds, chair of the District of Columbia Democratic State Committee, Fort Myer Construction executive, and former community affairs director to mayor Tony Williams
- John Capozzi, former Shadow representative from the District of Columbia (1995-1997)
- Doug Sloan, vice president of the Washington, DC NAACP branch

Out of the 71 ballots cast by District of Columbia Democratic State Committee officials, Bonds received 55.

== Candidates ==
=== Democratic Party ===
- Anita Bonds, incumbent councilmember
- Matthew Frumin, attorney and former chair of ANC 3E
- Elissa Silverman, policy analyst and former The Washington Post and Washington City Paper journalist
- Paul Zukerberg, attorney

Withdrawn

- Michael A. Brown, former member of the Council of the District of Columbia from the at-large district (2009-2013) and son of former U.S. Secretary of Commerce Ron Brown (still appeared on balllot)
- John Capozzi, former Shadow representative from the District of Columbia (1995-1997)
- A.J. Cooper, former TV host and Marine Corps veteran (endorsed Silverman)
- Jon Gann, documentary filmmaker
- Pedro Rubio Jr., federal contracting consultant
- John Settles II, finance executive

Did not qualify

- Diallo Brooks, fellow at the United States Department of Education

Declined

- Sekou Biddle, former member of the Council of the District of Columbia from the at-large district (2011)

Endorsements

Elissa Silverman

Local officials

- David Grosso, member of the Council of the District of Columbia from the at-large district (2013-2021)
- Sharon Ambrose, former member of the Council of the District of Columbia from Ward 6 (1997-2007)
- Kathy Patterson, former member of the Council of the District of Columbia from Ward 3 (1995-2007) (candidate's campaign chair)

Organizations

- Greater Greater Washington

Individuals

- A.J. Cooper, former TV host, Marine Corps veteran, and candidate for this seat

Newspapers

- Washington City Paper
Anita Bonds

Local officials

- Tony Williams, former mayor of the District of Columbia (1999-2007)
- Muriel Bowser, member of the Council of the District of Columbia from Ward 4 (2007-2015)
- Marion Barry, member of the Council of the District of Columbia from Ward 8 (1993-1995, 2005-2014), former mayor of the District of Columbia (1979-1991, 1995-1999), and former member of the Council of the District of Columbia from the at-large district (1975-1979)
- Muriel Bowser, member of the Council of the District of Columbia from Ward 4 (2007-2015)
- Jack Evans, member of the Council of the District of Columbia from Ward 2
- Vincent Orange, member of the Council of the District of Columbia from the at-large district (2011-2016) and Ward 5 (1999-2007)

Labor unions

- AFSCME

Individuals

- Sulaimon Brown, activist
Declined to endorse

Local officials

- Tommy Wells, member of the Council of the District of Columbia from Ward 6 (2007-2015)

Organizations

- Gertrude Stein Democratic Club

=== DC Statehood Green Party ===
- Perry Redd (D.C. Statehood Green), songwriter and activist

=== Republican Party ===
- Patrick Mara (Republican), member of the District of Columbia State Board of Education from Ward 1

Endorsements

Patrick Mara

State governors

- Chris Christie, governor of New Jersey (2010-2018)

Organizations

- Sierra Club
- District of Columbia Chamber of Commerce
- Fraternal Order of Police

Newspapers

- The Washington Post
- The Washington Blade

== General Election ==
2013 Council of the District of Columbia special election
Party	Candidate	Votes	%
Democratic	Anita Bonds	18,027	31.7%
Democratic	Elissa Silverman	15,228	26.8%
Republican	Patrick Mara	13,698	24.1%
Democratic	Matthew Frumin	6,307	11.1%
Democratic	Paul Zukerberg	1,195	2.1%
Democratic	Michael A. Brown (withdrawn)	1,100	1.9%
DC Statehood Green	Perry Redd	1,090	1.9%
Write-in		187	0.3%
Total votes		56,832	100.00%
