= Fort Myer Construction =

Construction company in Washington D.C., US

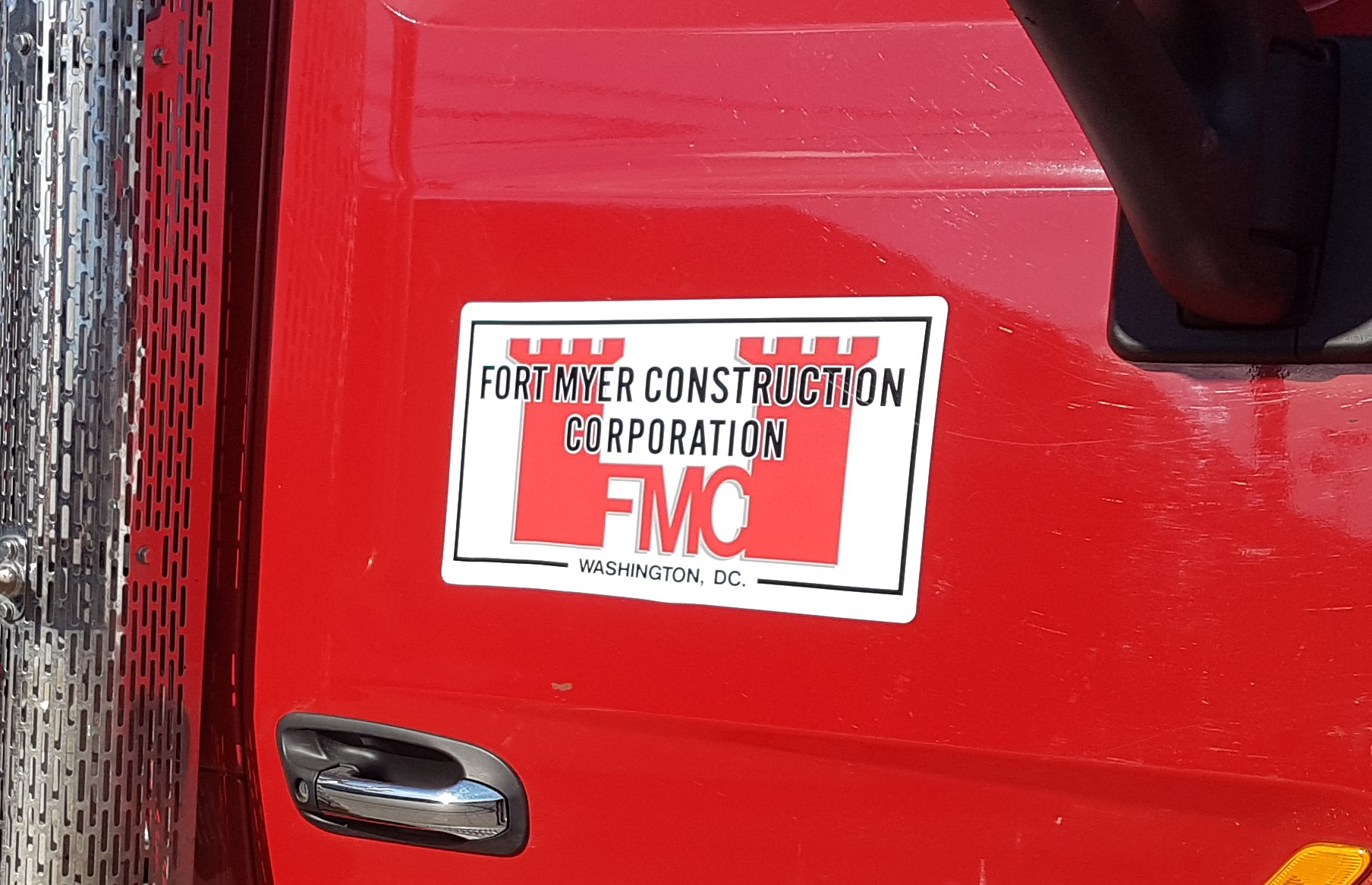
- Company type: Private
- Genre: Contracting
- Founded: 1972
- Headquarters: Washington, DC, U.S.
- Owner: Jose Rodriguez
- Website: www.fortmyer.com

Fort Myer Construction is a government contractor and road paving company based in Washington, DC. The company has been awarded millions of dollars in contracts from the DC government since its inception in 1972, many set aside for small and minority owned businesses. It has received attention for its contracting practices, influence in DC politics, and safety practices.

== History ==
Fort Myer Construction was incorporated in 1972 by Jose Rodriguez, a Portuguese immigrant. Rodriguez also owns District Paving, another contractor, and bought one of his major competitors, Roubin & Janeiro. Rodriguez's brother, Francisco Rodriguez-Neto, owns Capitol Paving, another contractor.

== Operations ==
Fort Myer Construction is the largest asphalt supplier and road paving company in the DC area. In 2012, Fort Myer Construction was paid over $78 million by the district. DC government-financed projects account for 40 percent of Fort Myer Construction's income.

The company is designated as a Certified Business Enterprise (CBE), allowing it to receive preference in procurement opportunities offered by the District of Columbia. The company has dominated the program for small business and minority set asides. Court filings contested the need for the benefit when Fort Myer Construction demonstrated an ability to freely compete for local contracts on the open market as part of a lawsuit that the program unfairly excluded white-owned businesses.

Concerned that media coverage might negatively affect its business, Fort Myer Construction hired DP Strategies to help "tell its story" through a video .

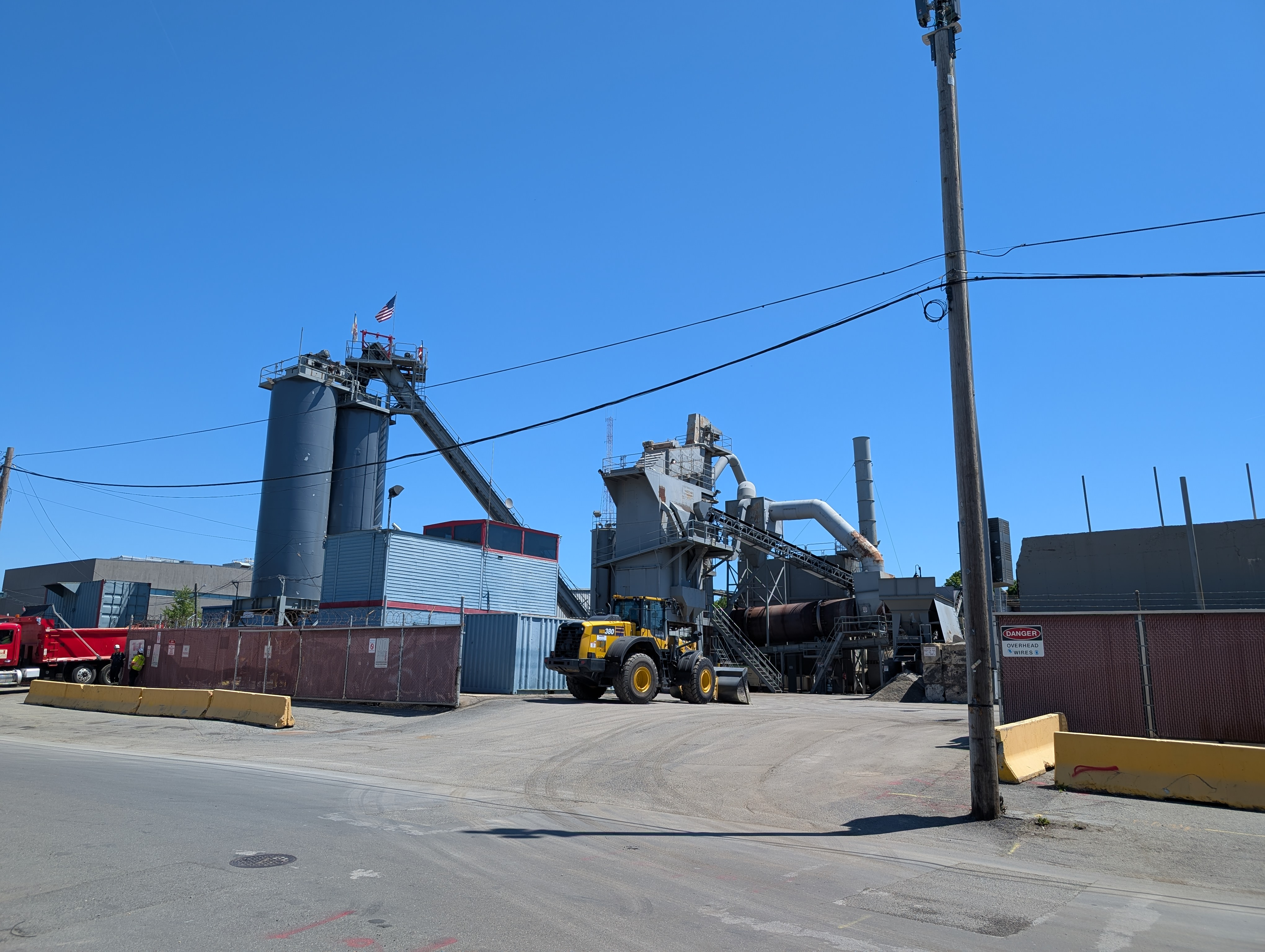
One of Fort Myer Construction's asphalt plants as seen from 5th Street Northeast

In 2019, the company successfully completed reconstruction of Beach Drive, a popular road in DC's Rock Creek Park.

=== Quality ===
Fort Myer Construction’s quality control lab is working with on the science behind preventing potholes. The current process has become more sophisticated with updated mixes, quality control, application and assessment. The methods are constantly changing to ensure smooth sailing when the rubber hits the road.

=== Community ===
The company has supported the DC Students Construction Trades Foundation. Chris Kerns, general counsel of Ft. Myer, received an award.

=== Campaign contributions ===
Fort Myer Construction has made substantial contributions to DC politicians. Anita Bonds was a top Fort Myer Construction official while serving as chair of the DC Democratic State Committee and before her election to the Council of the District of Columbia. Between 2002 and 2014, the company and its relatives gave more than $118,000 to candidates in political contributions. Fort Myer Construction was one of the largest donors to Fresh PAC, a short-lived initiative by Mayor Muriel Bowser to circumvent campaign finance regulations.

== Contract controversies ==
Fort Myer Construction overbilled the government by inflating the cost of asphalt for construction jobs between 1995 and 1998. To make sure they were paid, the company bribed nine D.C. Department of Public Works employees, for which it pleaded guilty in 2003 and paid $900,000 in fines. Once discovered, Fort Myer Construction was barred from federal contracts for 18 months and for DC contracts for three years. Through its lobbying efforts, the company changed DC's debarment process, lifting the restrictions and making it more difficult for the District to sanction contractors.

In 2014, DC's Office of the Inspector General found that Fort Myer Construction received below market rates for leasing the D.C. government's equipment. The company was charged less than what another jurisdiction billed the company, and there was limited documentation of the arrangement. Fort Myer Construction then held the equipment for more than three years.

=== Recent investigations ===
In 2016, the head of D.C.'s Department of General Services resigned and contracting officials were fired following the award of two large construction projects, St. Elizabeths East Entertainment and Sports Arena and Audi Field, to firms other than Fort Myer Construction. One of the fired employees filed a whistleblower lawsuit alleging that he had been terminated for the failure to channel contracts to Fort Myer Construction; the other made similar allegations in an administrative proceeding. A DC government office director reported that a Fort Myer Construction lobbyist used the DGS firings to discourage other government decisions unfavorable to the company.

The episode prompted an investigation by Councilmember Mary Cheh. In 2017, Cheh's report found that in addition to the questionable firings, a city employee had illegally shared confidential information with Fort Myer Construction about a competitor's bid on a separate project. The report found that the D.C. City Administrator had urged quick settlement of unresolved contract disputes with Fort Myer Construction in an attempt to appease it. These actions led to an additional $4 million payout to the company.

== Other incidents ==
In 2015, the company was sued for $12.5 million after a senior citizen was run over and killed by a Fort Myer Construction street sweeper. The alert signal on the vehicle was working, but the camera was not.

In 2014, the company settled with the US Department of Labor over its discrimination against women and minorities. According to the settlement, the company compensated Hispanics and African Americans at lower hourly rates for the same work. Supervisors sexually harassed females subordinates and used derogatory language to minority and veteran employees. Fort Myer Construction agreed to pay another $900,000 in back wages and interest to 371 minority workers.

In 2012, an 81-year-old employee was killed by a Fort Myer Construction dump truck driver. After striking the man once, the operator realized he had hit something, moved the vehicle, and hit him again. The 2012 incident followed a similar death of a 60-year-old by a dump truck driver three years earlier.

In 1996, staff working for a Fort Myer Construction subsidiary were arrested at the Anacostia Naval Base. The workers were immigrants from Mexico or Central America and were detained by Immigration and Naturalization Service after security officers became suspicious of their status.
