= Kenyan McDuffie =

American politician (born 1975)

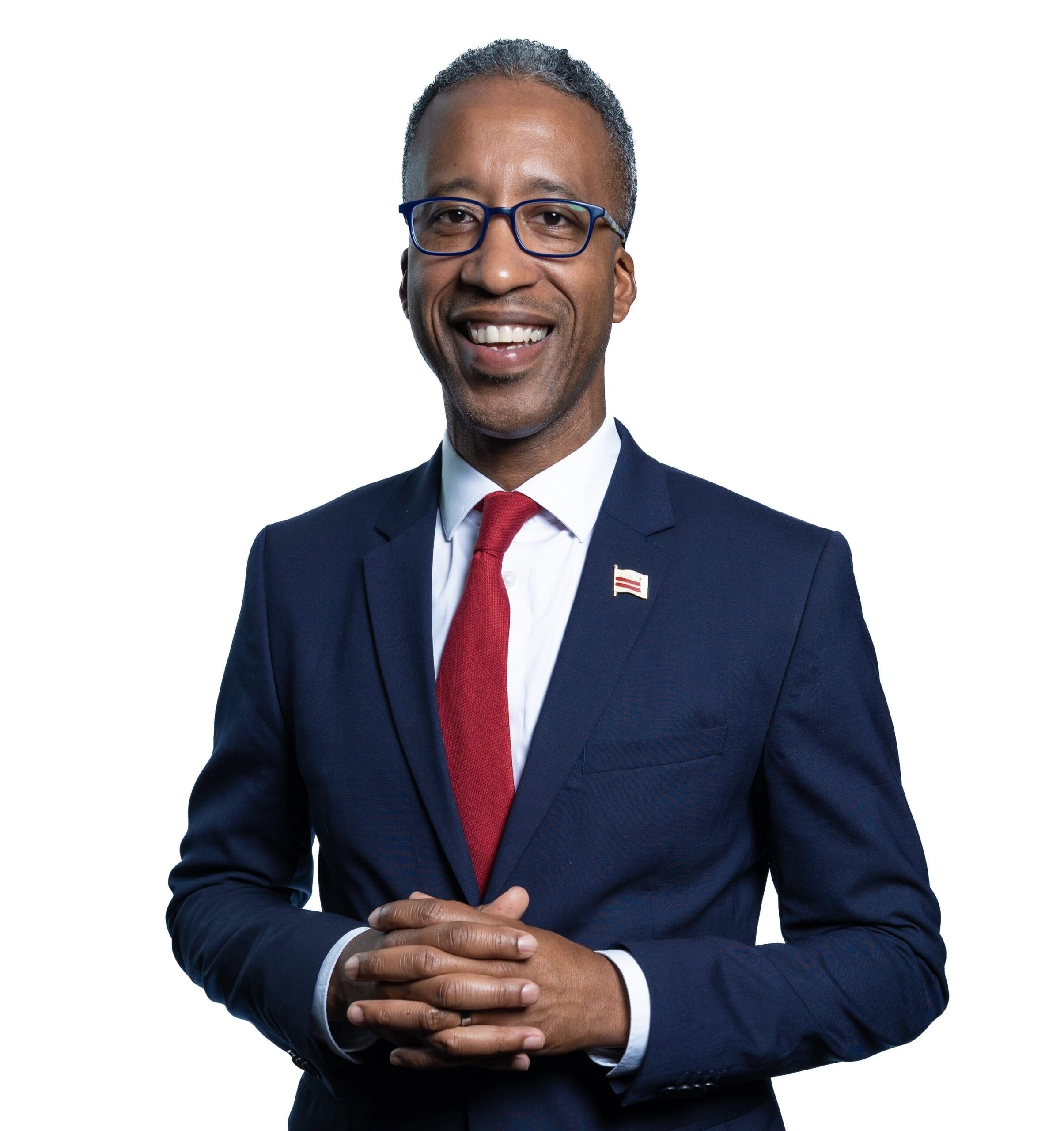

Chair pro tempore of the Council of the District of Columbia
- In office January 2, 2013 – January 5, 2026
- Preceded by: Michael Brown
- Succeeded by: Anita Bonds

Member of the Council of the District of Columbia from the at-large district
- In office January 2, 2023 – January 5, 2026
- Preceded by: Elissa Silverman
- Succeeded by: Doni Crawford

Member of the Council of the District of Columbia from Ward 5
- In office May 30, 2012 – January 2, 2023
- Preceded by: Harry Thomas Jr.
- Succeeded by: Zachary Parker

Personal details
- Born: September 30, 1975 (age 51)
- Party: Democratic (before 2022, 2026–present); Independent (2022–2026)
- Education: University of the District of Columbia (attended); Howard University (BA); University of Maryland, Baltimore (JD)

Kenyan Renard McDuffie (born September 30, 1975) is an American politician who served as an independent at-large member of the Council of the District of Columbia from 2023 to 2026 after previously representing Ward 5 on the council as a Democrat from 2012 to 2023. He resigned from his position to re-register as a Democrat and unsuccessfully ran for mayor in the 2026 mayoral election.

== Early life and career ==
McDuffie grew up in the Stronghold neighborhood in Northeast Washington, D.C. After graduating from Woodrow Wilson High School, he sold ice cream at the National Zoo in Washington, D.C., and briefly attended the University of the District of Columbia. He later worked for the United States Postal Service, delivering mail in the Friendship Heights and Spring Valley neighborhoods.

After four years with the Postal Service, McDuffie returned to the University of the District of Columbia before graduating from Howard University summa cum laude with a bachelor's degree in political science and community development in 2002. He then received a Juris Doctor from University of Maryland School of Law in 2006. In law school, he served as an associate editor of The University of Maryland Journal of Race, Religion, Gender, and Class, and as a research assistant to then-professor Tom Perez.

Following his graduation, McDuffie was hired by Prince George's County, Maryland, first working as a law clerk for an Associate Judge on the 7th Judicial Circuit of Maryland and later as an assistant state's attorney where he prosecuted misdemeanor and felony cases in District Court and on appeal in Circuit Court. McDuffie later worked for Delegate Eleanor Holmes Norton in both her local constituent services office and Capitol Hill office, where he drafted legislation. In 2008, he served as a trial attorney for the Civil Rights Division of the U.S. Department of Justice, where he conducted investigations and managed complex cases throughout the United States regarding enforcement of key federal civil rights statutes, including defending the rights of the mentally ill. During his tenure at DOJ, he worked on cases to reform the policies and procedures of police departments. In 2010, McDuffie became a policy advisor to Public Safety and Justice Deputy Mayor Paul Quander, serving as a liaison to public safety agencies. He has also served as president of the Stronghold Civic Association.

== Electoral history ==
=== 2010 election ===
In February 2010, McDuffie resigned from his position in the mayor's administration and declared his candidacy to represent Ward 5 on the Council of the District of Columbia. McDuffie supported expanding employment opportunities and tackling HIV. He criticized incumbent Harry Thomas Jr. for being reactive rather than proactive. During his campaign, McDuffie stressed several urgent problems in the ward, including lack of quality education, lack of effective job-training programs, lack of affordable housing, and a need for more services for senior citizens. Thomas won the Democratic Party primary election and went on to win the general election as well.

=== 2012 election ===
In January 2012, Thomas resigned from the Council and pleaded guilty to two federal crimes: theft and filing three years of false tax returns. McDuffie entered the special election to fill the vacant Ward 5 seat.

The District's firefighter union, the Service Employees International Union Maryland and DC State Council, National Nurses United union, Local 25 Hospitality Workers' Union, AFL-CIO, DC Latino Caucus, Gertrude Stein Democratic Club and Councilmember Tommy Wells endorsed McDuffie's candidacy.

McDuffie won the special election, receiving 43 percent of the votes.

=== 2014 election ===
McDuffie ran for re-election in the 2014 election and won the primary against Kathy Henderson, Advisory Neighborhood Commissioner for Carver Langston; and Carolyn C. Steptoe, Advisory Neighborhood Commissioner for Brookland. Libertarian Preston Cornish is the only candidate who opposed him in the General Election. He was re-elected with 83.93% of the vote.

=== 2018 election ===
McDuffie ran for re-election in the 2018 election. He won with 79.3% of the vote, defeating Kathy Henderson, Joyce Robinson-Paul, and Amone Banks on November 6, 2018.

=== 2022 election ===
McDuffie announced his candidacy for Attorney General for the District of Columbia and said that he would not run to represent Ward 5 for another term. McDuffie's qualifications were challenged by candidate Bruce Spiva, who argued that the legislation required that the attorney general was "actively engaged" as an attorney for five years and that service on the Council was not adequate. The Board of Elections supported the challenge, the Court of Appeals upheld their decision, and McDuffie's appeal for a rehearing was denied.

In June 2022, McDuffie changed his registration to independent and picked up paperwork to file to run as a candidate for one of the at-large seats on the Council held by incumbents Elissa Silverman and Anita Bonds. He was elected in November 2022, finishing behind Bonds but ahead of Silverman.

=== 2026 election ===
On January 14, 2026, McDuffie announced his candidacy to seek the Democratic nomination for the Office of Mayor for The District of Columbia. He was defeated by council member Janeese Lewis George in the primary securing 35% of the vote.

== Political positions and initiatives ==
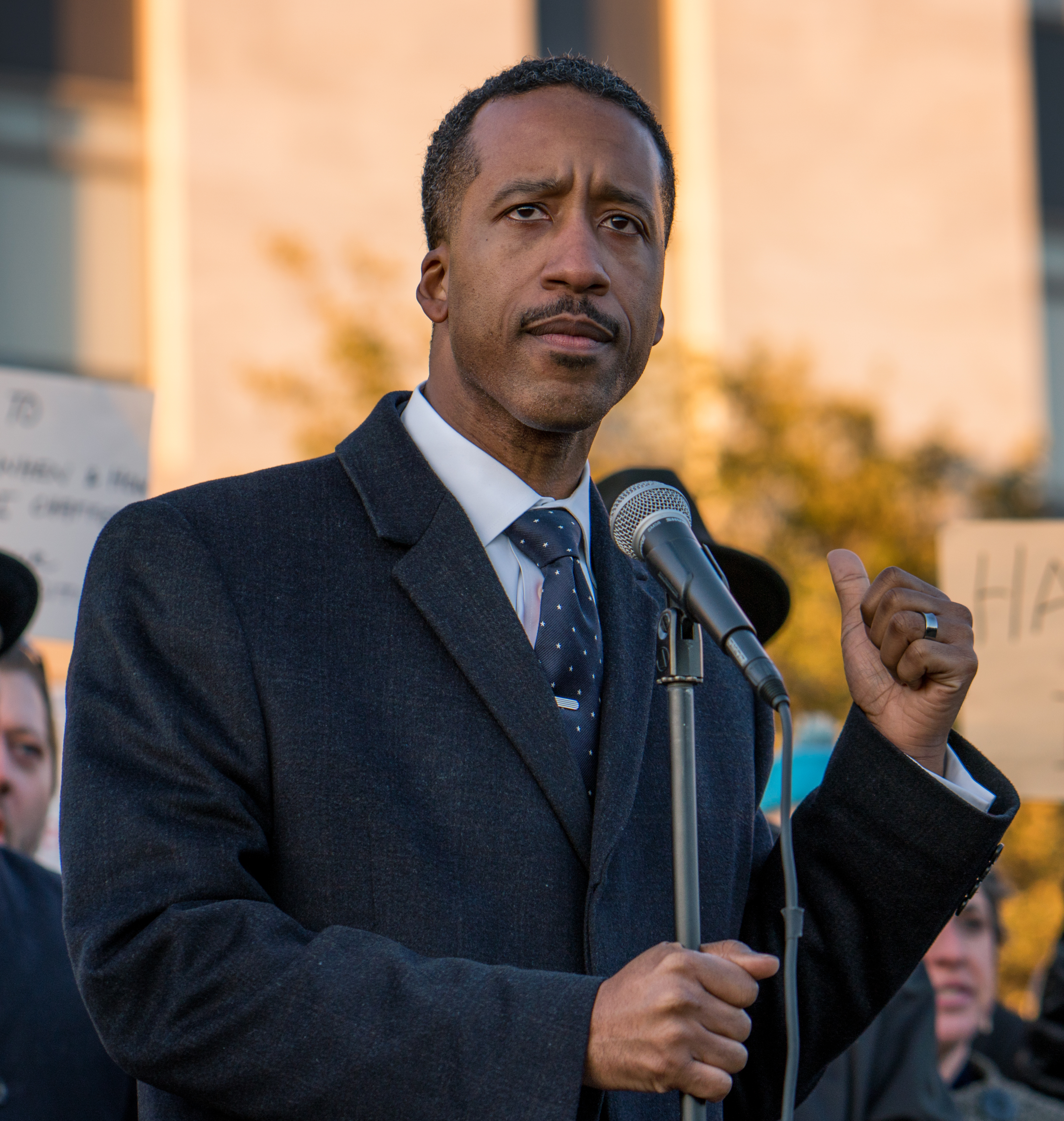
McDuffie at a rally in 2017

=== Committee on Government Operations, Chair ===
As Chairman of the Committee on Government Operations, McDuffie successfully passed campaign finance reform to close the “LLC loophole,” which historically has allowed limited liability companies to make campaign contributions well above individual limits. His bill also requires campaigns to report all fundraising data online for the Office of Campaign Finance to publish publicly, mandates campaign finance training for candidates, expands the range of penalties for violations, and restricts money order donations to $100. Additionally, the legislation requires lobbyists to disclose any contributions bundled and forwarded to a campaign.

=== Contracting ===
In 2019, McDuffie initially questioned the sole source award of the D.C. Lottery contract, valued at $215 million. McDuffie later reversed his position and the contract was narrowly approved. It was revealed that his cousin, Keith McDuffie, was listed as Chief Executive Officer of a subcontractor who received $3 million from the deal. McDuffie denied knowledge of his cousin's involvement.

=== Judiciary Committee, Chair ===
McDuffie advanced “Ban the Box” legislation that bans the use of criminal background checks in housing as well as passing legislation to end the unfair use of credit history in hiring. McDuffie also passed the innovative Neighborhood Engagement Achieves Results Act (NEAR Act), which reforms the District’s criminal justice system by incorporating behavioral and mental health professionals to perform tasks that previously fell to law enforcement officers.

=== Committee on Business and Economic Development ===
McDuffie sought to address the District’s racial wealth gap through the Child Wealth Building Act, a child trust fund, or “baby bonds,” aimed at eliminating the District’s stark racial wealth gap and ending generational poverty.

In 2021, McDuffie introduced legislation to create a Task Force to research and develop reparation proposals for African American descendants of slavery.

In addition, McDuffie served as a member of the following committees.

- Committee on Transportation and the Environment
- Committee on Housing and Executive Administration
- Committee on Recreation, Libraries and Youth Affairs

== Personal life ==
McDuffie lives on North Capitol Street with his wife, Princess, and their daughters, Jozi and Kesi.

Council of the District of Columbia
Preceded by Michael Brown	Chair pro tempore of the Council of the District of Columbia; 2013–2026	Succeeded by Anita Bonds
