= Elissa Silverman =

Washington, D.C. politician

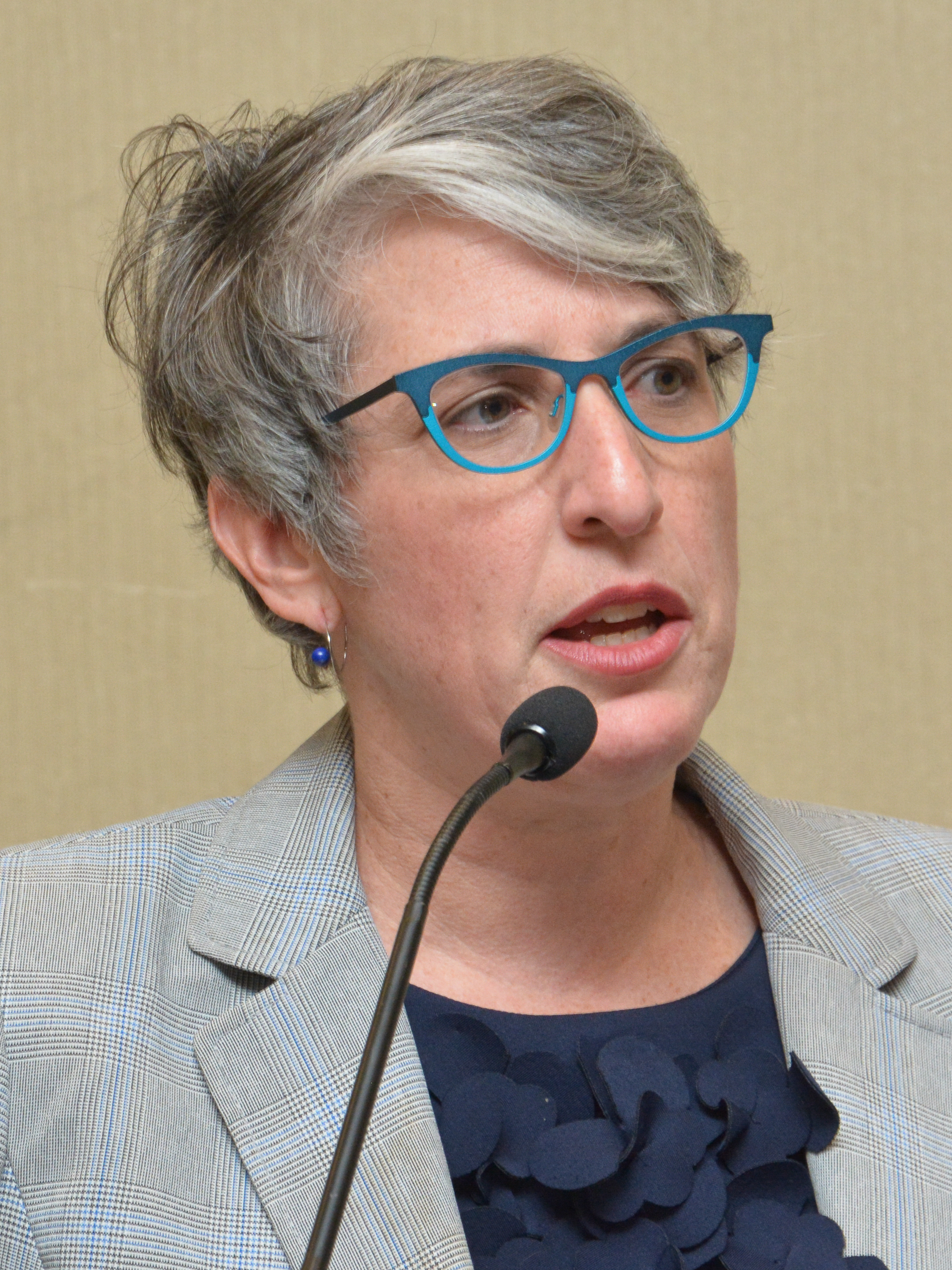
- Silverman in 2020

Member of the Council of the District of Columbia from the at-large district
- Incumbent
- Assumed office July 17, 2026
- Preceded by: Doni Crawford
- In office January 2, 2015 – January 2, 2023
- Preceded by: David Catania
- Succeeded by: Kenyan McDuffie

Personal details
- Born: 1972 or 1973 (age 52–53) Baltimore, Maryland, U.S.
- Party: Democratic (before 2014); Independent (2014–present)
- Education: Brown University (BA); University of Maryland, College Park (attended)

Elissa Silverman (born 1972/1973) is an American politician and reporter from Washington, D.C.. She is an independent at-large member of the Council of the District of Columbia and previously held that office from 2015 to 2023. Before 2015, she was a journalist at The Washington Post and Washington City Paper covering D.C. politics, and a policy analyst at the D.C. Fiscal Policy Institute. She first ran for Council in 2013 and lost before running again in 2014. She won in 2014 and was re-elected in November 2018 for a four-year term, but lost her re-election bid in 2022.

== Early life and professional career ==
Elissa Silverman was born to parents Jack and Ruth Silverman in Baltimore, Maryland, where she attended public school. She majored in economics and history at Brown University. She has worked as a reporter for The Washington Post and, earlier, the Washington City Paper where she wrote the Loose Lips column. She also helped the D.C. Public Trust in its attempt to prohibit direct corporate contributions in local politics. In April 2009, she was hired as a policy analyst and communications director at the D.C. Fiscal Policy Institute, a position she held until resigning to run for public office in April 2014. She attended the University of Maryland, pursuing a master's degree in urban studies and planning.

== Political career ==
=== 2013 election ===
When At-large Council Member Phil Mendelson was elected council chairman in 2012, his former seat on the council was declared vacant. Silverman filed to run as a Democratic candidate for the at-large seat in the April special election. Silverman ran against incumbent Anita Bonds, and Board of Education member Patrick Mara. Silverman said she would not accept campaign contributions from corporations.

Silverman supported increasing funding to government programs that subsidize affordable housing, and expanding the minimum wage law to cover restaurant workers. Silverman said it is a problem that a quarter of District students attend their zoned neighborhood schools, saying more governmental resources should improve schools.

Following a $440 million budget surplus in 2012, Bonds and Mara supported tax cuts, while Silverman said she would prioritize helping people in other ways before cutting taxes. A political action committee criticized Silverman when she said she did not think residents minded paying taxes and minded poor city services more.

Silverman and her campaign tried to negotiate a deal with rival candidate Matthew Frumin, asking him to drop out of the election in exchange for her supporting him in a future election. Frumin declined the offer, saying he felt he still had a chance to win. Frumin said Silverman's offer may contradict her case for being a reformer.

Silverman's candidacy was endorsed by Council Member David Grosso former Council Member Sharon Ambrose, and former Council Member Kathy Patterson. She was also endorsed by the editorial board of the Washington City Paper, Democracy for America, and the Office and Professional Employees International Union Local 2.

Silverman finished second to Anita Bonds, by a margin of 31% to 28%.

=== 2014 election ===
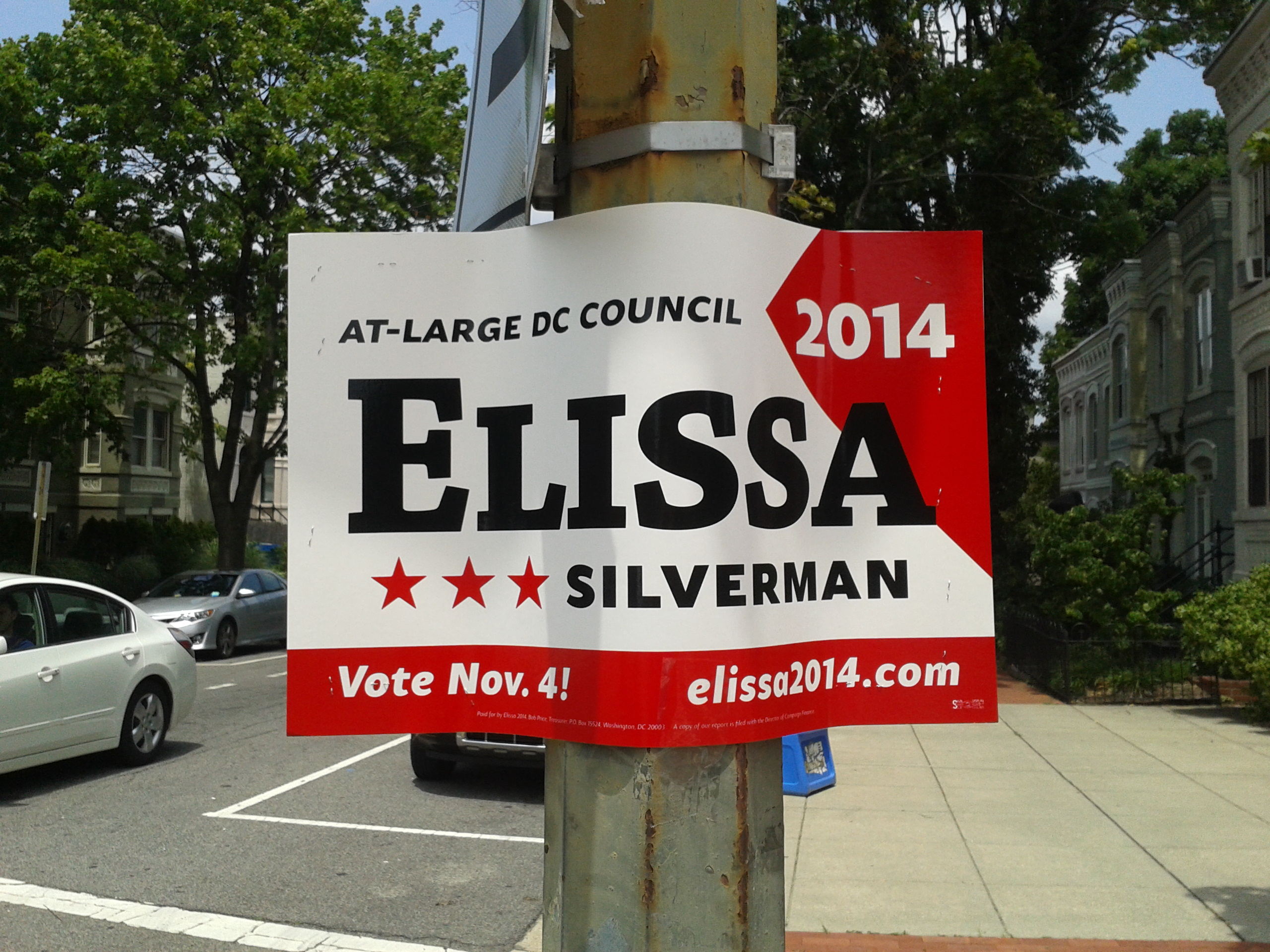
Promotional sign for Silverman's 2014 campaign.

When independent Council Member David Catania decided to run for mayor rather than reelection in 2014, Silverman decided to change her official political status to independent and leave her position at the D.C. Fiscal Policy Institute to consider another candidacy. Silverman publicly declared her candidacy for Council the next month.

Silverman emphasized accountability of elected officials, accountability of public schools, quality education, affordable housing, and good public transportation. Silverman said she would not accept campaign contributions from corporations. She was proud of helping increase the District's minimum wage to $11.50 per hour and expand the mandatory paid sick leave law to restaurant employees.

Silverman's candidacy was endorsed by Ward 8 Council Member Marion Barry, Ward 6 Council candidate Charles Allen, the D.C. Chapter of the National Organization for Women, D.C. Working Families, Jews United for Justice, and the D.C. Muslim Caucus, Metro Washington Council AFL–CIO, Service Employees International Union 32BJ and 1199, DC for Democracy, the Sierra Club, the DC Police Union, the United Food and Commercial Workers local, and the International Association of Fire Fighters Local 36. She was also endorsed by the editorial board of the Washington City Paper.

Silverman was elected to the at-large seat in the 2014 general election with 12% of the total votes.

=== 2018 election ===
Silverman stood for re-election in the 2018 general election. Among her challengers were S. Kathryn Allen, a business-backed challenger who was a former insurance agent and banking commissioner. Allen, who was endorsed by former mayor Anthony Williams and former D.C. Councilmember David Catania, had specifically challenged Silverman over the latter's support of a comprehensive paid leave proposal which was passed into law by the council in 2016. Allen and other opponents of the paid leave bill argued that it imposes a costly tax on DC businesses and that the benefits will primarily accrue to residents of Maryland and Virginia who commute into the city. Allen was disqualified from the 2018 ballot as a result of signature fraud on her nominating petitions. Dionne Reeder, a candidate backed by Mayor Muriel Bowser, entered the race to replace Silverman, though was not successful in the November 2018 general election.

=== 2022 election ===
Silverman lost her re-election bid in November 2022 to Anita Bonds and Kenyan McDuffie, where two seats were up for election.

=== 2026 election ===
After McDuffie announced in January 2026 he would resign his seat to run for mayor, Silverman launched a bid for the June special and November regular elections for her former seat. Multiple local unions, including the Metropolitan Washington Council AFL-CIO and the Washington Teachers Union, endorsed Silverman's return bid. Silverman won the special election. She took office after the Board of Elections certified the results on July 17.

== Positions ==
Silverman was the lead champion for D.C.’s paid family leave program. The program passed in 2016.

In 2016, Silverman introduced legislation to limit public spending on a proposed practice facility for the Washington Wizards. The law would cap public expenditures at $50 million and hold Ted Leonsis's company, which owns the team, responsible for any cost overruns.

== Committees ==
Silverman was appointed to the following committees for Council Period 21 (January 2015 to December 2016).

- Committee on Business, Consumer and Regulatory Affairs
- Committee on Housing and Community Development
- Committee on Finance and Revenue

== Personal life ==
Silverman lives in Capitol Hill. She is Jewish. She currently serves as a board member of Seabury Resources for Aging, which provides D.C. seniors and their families housing and other supportive resources.

== Electoral results ==
=== 2013 ===
2013 Special Election, Council of the District of Columbia, At-Large Seat
Party	Candidate	Votes	%
Democratic	Anita Bonds	18,027	31
Democratic	Elissa Silverman	15,228	27
Republican	Patrick Mara	13,698	24
Democratic	Matthew Frumin	6,307	11
Democratic	Paul Zukerberg	1,195	2
Democratic	Michael A. Brown	1,100	2
DC Statehood Green	Perry Redd	1,090	2
	write-in	187	0

=== 2014 ===
2014 General Election, Council of the District of Columbia, At-Large Seats
Party	Candidate	Votes	%
Democratic	Anita Bonds	85,575	24
Independent	Elissa Silverman	41,300	12
Independent	Michael D. Brown	28,614	8
Independent	Robert White	22,198	6
Independent	Courtney R. Snowden	19,551	5
DC Statehood Green	Eugene Puryear	12,525	4
Independent	Graylan Scott Hagler	10,539	3
Independent	Khalid Pitts	10,392	3
Republican	Marc Morgan	9,947	3
Independent	Brian Hart	8,933	3
Independent	Kishan Putta	6,135	2
Independent	Calvin Gurley	4,553	1
Independent	Eric J. Jones	4,405	1
Libertarian	Frederick Steiner	3,766	1
Independent	Wendell Felder	2,964	1
	write-in	1,472	0

=== 2018 ===
At-large district election, 2018
Party	Candidate	Votes	%
Democratic	Anita Bonds (incumbent)	152,460	44.55%
Independent	Elissa Silverman (incumbent)	90,589	26.47%
Independent	Dionne Reeder	49,132	14.36%
DC Statehood Green	David Schwartzman	26,006	7.60%
Republican	Ralph J. Chittams Sr.	12,629	3.69%
Independent	Rustin M. Lewis	8,463	2.47%
	Scattering	2,909	0.85%
Total votes		342,188	100.0%
Democratic hold			
Independent hold			

=== 2022 ===
2022 Council of the District of Columbia At-large election
Party	Candidate	Votes	%
Democratic	Anita Bonds	103,991	31.7%
Independent	Kenyan McDuffie	71,924	21.9%
Independent	Elissa Silverman	63,471	19.3%
Independent	Graham McLaughlin	33,402	10.2%
Independent	Karim D. Marshall	16,883	5.1%
DC Statehood Green	David Schwartzman	16,650	5.1%
Republican	Giuseppe Niosi	12,832	3.9%
Independent	Fred Hill	7,494	2.3%
Write-in		1,620	0.5%
Total valid votes		328.267	100%

=== 2026 ===
2026 Council of the District of Columbia At-large special election results
Party	Candidate	Votes	%
Independent	Elissa Silverman	73,246	55.36
Independent	Doni Crawford (incumbent)	34,080	25.76
Independent	Jacque Patterson	23,487	17.75
Write-in		1,499	1.13
Total votes		132,312	100.00
n/a	Overvotes	666	
n/a	Undervotes	21,997	
