= Anita Bonds =

American politician (born 1945)

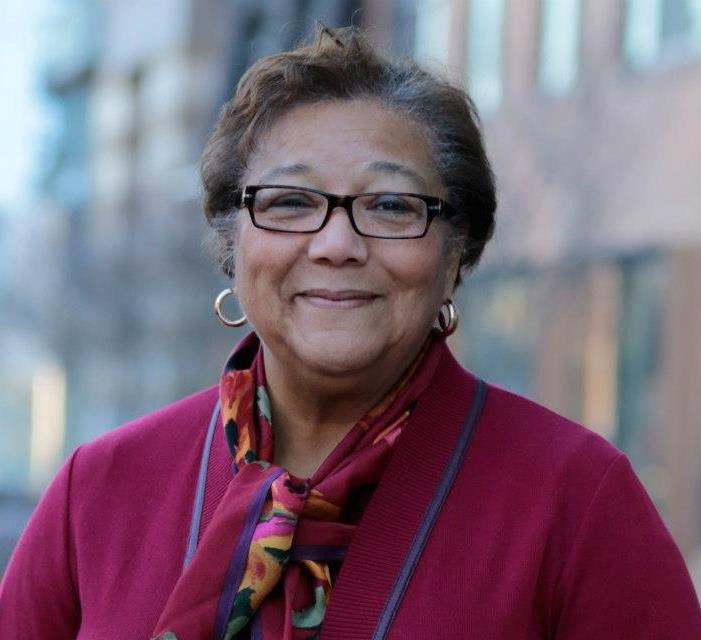

Chair pro tempore of the Council of the District of Columbia
- Incumbent
- Assumed office January 20, 2026
- Preceded by: Kenyan McDuffie

Member of the Council of the District of Columbia from the at-large district
- Incumbent
- Assumed office December 11, 2012
- Preceded by: Phil Mendelson

Chair of the District of Columbia Democratic Party
- In office November 2006 – September 20, 2018
- Preceded by: Wanda Lockridge
- Succeeded by: Charles Wilson

Personal details
- Born: 1945 (age 80–81)
- Party: Democratic
- Education: University of California, Berkeley (BS)

Anita Bonds (born 1945) is an American Democratic politician in Washington, D.C. She is an at-large member of the Council of the District of Columbia. She served as the Chair of the District of Columbia Democratic Party from 2006 to 2018. She worked as an executive at Fort Myer Construction, a District contractor. Bonds announced she would not seek reelection to the Council on December 7, 2025.

== Early life ==
Bonds was raised in Southeast Washington, D.C. She attended college at University of California, Berkeley, where she majored in chemistry.

== Career ==
Bonds helped run Marion Barry's first campaign for the District of Columbia Board of Education in 1971. She was elected Ward 2 delegate to the Black Political Convention in 1972. In 1973, Bonds ran in a special election for the Ward 2 seat on the District of Columbia Board of Education. Bill Treanor won the election with 62 percent of the vote. Bonds worked as ward and precinct coordinator for Clifford Alexander's campaign for District mayor in 1974. She served as deputy campaign manager for Barry's 1978 and 1982 bids for District mayor. In 1979, Mayor Barry named Bonds special assistant for constituent services.

Bonds served as manager of John L. Ray's reelection campaign for at-large councilmember in 1980. In 1983, Bonds was director of the District of Columbia Office of Community Services. She served on Jesse Jackson's presidential campaign in 1984. She was campaign manager for Barry's bid for a third term as District mayor in 1986.

In 1990, Bonds helped the defense attorney in Marion Barry's drug and perjury charges. In 1994, Bonds became special assistant to District Mayor Sharon Pratt Kelly's chief of staff, Karen A. Tramontano. In May 1998, Bonds was named campaign manager for Councilmember Harold Brazil's bid for District mayor. In August 1998, she left that role after a campaign reorganization.

From 2004 to 2005, she served as director of the mayor's Office of Community Affairs. In 2005, she became a senior adviser to Council member Kwame R. Brown.

When elected to the D.C. Council, Bonds worked as an executive for Fort Myer Construction, one of the district's largest contractors. Bonds said she would cut back on her hours when taking her seat on the council but did not immediately sever ties with the company. She characterized questions about her outside employment as chauvinistic.

== Councilmember ==
=== Election ===
In November 2012, Democrat Phil Mendelson won a special election to become the chair of the Council of the District of Columbia, creating a vacancy of his former seat as at-large member of the council. District of Columbia law provides that, in the event of a vacancy of an at-large seat on the council, the political party of the former incumbent shall decide who will fill the seat until a special election can be held. Bonds served as Chair of the DC Democratic State Committee at the time.

Bonds announced that she would seek to be selected to hold the at-large Council seat. Douglass Sloan, a public affairs consultant and Advisory Neighborhood Commissioner for Riggs Park, and John Capozzi, former Shadow U.S. Representative and former at-large member of the District of Columbia Democratic State Committee, announced that they would also seek the selection. In a vote by the D.C. Democratic State Committee, Bonds received 55 of the 71 votes cast, winning the selection process. Bonds was sworn in as councilmember on December 11, 2012.

Bonds won reelection in the 2013 special election.

=== Service ===
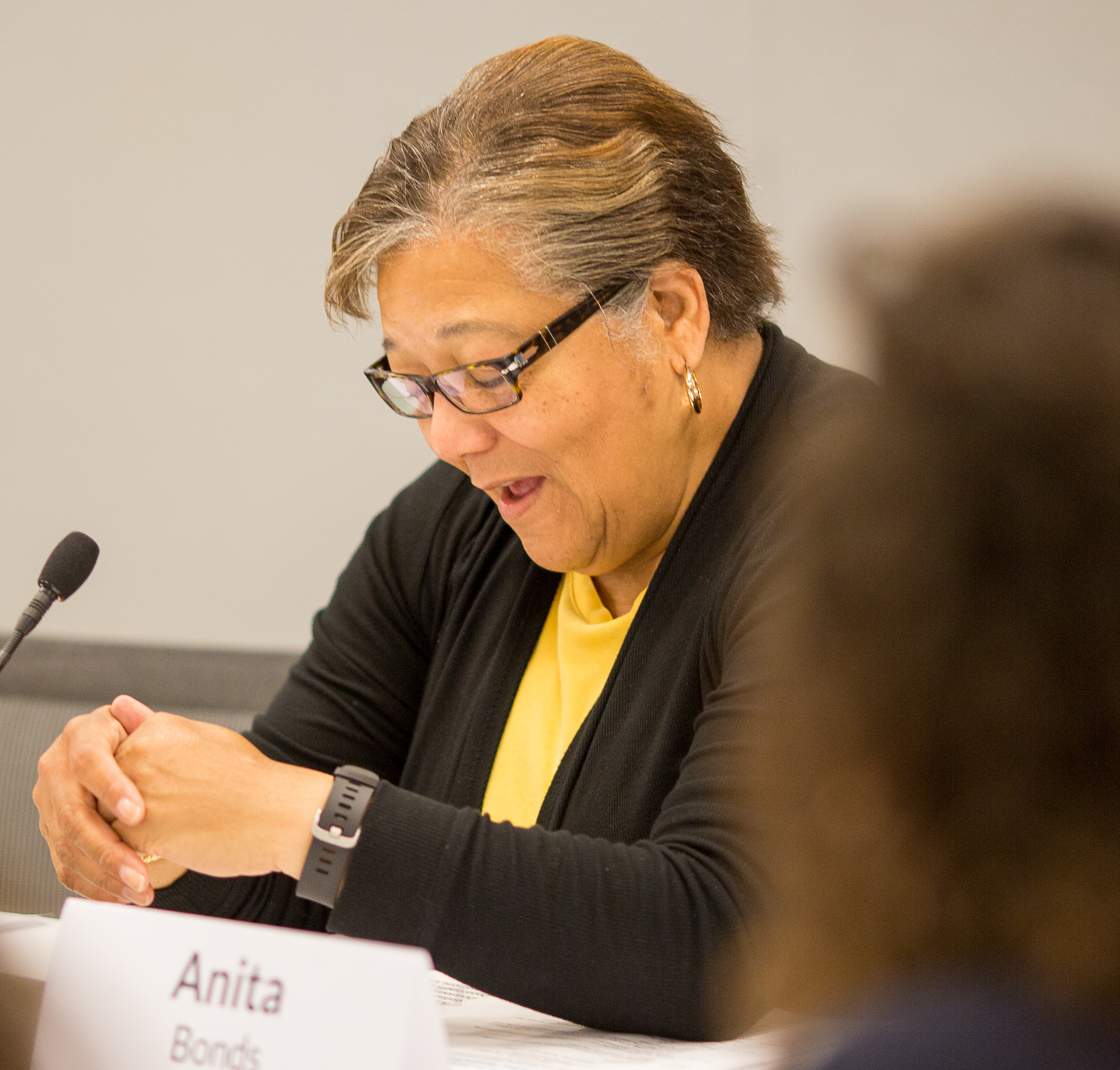
Anita Bonds at DC Long-Term Housing Affordability Roundtable (2016)

Bonds introduced legislation to limit property taxes on senior citizens. Her bill exempted homeowners with a moderate income or lower who have lived in the District for 15 consecutive years.

In 2017, Bonds attended the parade for the inauguration of Donald Trump.

Bond won reelection in 2018 against a trio of challengers who were half her age. Most of her donors came from people and companies associated with DC's building industry.

In December 2019, Bonds was criticized in the media for revealing the identity of a whistleblower during a public hearing. She claimed the outing was accidental, but some D.C. government employees suggested on background that they believed it was an intentional act of retaliation.

In July 2020, Bonds opposed legislation that would have moved funds from the extension of the D.C. Streetcar to repair public housing. Earlier, Bonds made a statement saying she supported the budget change.

In October 2020, Bonds complained after activists from the advocacy group Sunrise Movement demonstrated in front of her home, protesting that she was not more supportive of affordable housing and her endorsement of a developer for a vacant at-large position on the DC Council. Bonds equated her treatment to other African Americans who suffered at the hands of the Ku Klux Klan.

In January 2026, Bonds was elected as chair pro tempore.

== Personal life ==
Bonds is widowed. She has one adult daughter, two adult sons, and seven grandchildren.

== Election results ==
=== 2012 ===
2013 Council of the District of Columbia, At Large, Special Election
Party	Candidate	Votes	%
Democratic	Anita Bonds	18,027	31
Democratic	Elissa Silverman	15,228	27
Republican	Patrick Mara	13,698	24
Democratic	Matthew Frumin	6,307	11
Democratic	Paul Zuckerberg	1,195	2
Democratic	Michael A. Brown	1,100	2
DC Statehood Green	Perry Redd	1,090	2
	Write-in	187	0

=== 2014 ===
2014 General Election, Council of the District of Columbia, At-Large Seats
Party	Candidate	Votes	%
Democratic	Anita Bonds	85,575	24
Independent	Elissa Silverman	41,300	12
Independent	Michael D. Brown	28,614	8
Independent	Robert White	22,198	6
Independent	Courtney R. Snowden	19,551	5
DC Statehood Green	Eugene Puryear	12,525	4
Independent	Graylan Scott Hagler	10,539	3
Independent	Khalid Pitts	10,392	3
Republican	Marc Morgan	9,947	3
Independent	Brian Hart	8,933	3
Independent	Kishan Putta	6,135	2
Independent	Calvin Gurley	4,553	1
Independent	Eric J. Jones	4,405	1
Libertarian	Frederick Steiner	3,766	1
Independent	Wendell Felder	2,964	1
	write-in	1,472	0

=== 2018 ===
2018 General Election, Council of the District of Columbia, At-Large Seats
Party	Candidate	Votes	%
Democratic	Anita Bonds	152,460	44.55
Independent	Elissa Silverman	90,589	26.47
Independent	Dionne Reeder	49,132	14.36
Independent	Rustin Lewis	8,463	2.47
DC Statehood Green	David Schwartzman	26,006	7.6
Republican	Ralph J. Chittams, Sr.	12,629	3.69
	write-in	2,909	0.85

=== 2022 ===
2022 General Election, Council of the District of Columbia, At-Large Seats
Party	Candidate	Votes	%
Independent	Elissa Silverman	63,471	19.34
Independent	Karim D. Marshall	16,883	5.14
Independent	Fred Hill	7,494	2.28
Independent	Kenyan McDuffie	71,924	21.91
Democratic	Anita Bonds	103,991	31.68
DC Statehood Green	David Schwartzman	16,650	5.07
Independent	Graham McLaughlin	33,402	10.18
Republican	Giuseppe Niosi	12,832	3.91
	write-in	1,620	0.49

== Committees ==
Bonds currently serves on the following committees:

- Committee on Executive Administration and Labor (Chairperson)
- Committee of the Whole
- Committee on Business and Economic Development
- Committee on Judiciary and Public Safety
- Committee on Housing

Bonds is also a former member of the Committee on Education and Finance and Revenue.

Party political offices
Preceded by Wanda Lockridge	Chair of the District of Columbia Democratic Party; 2006–2018	Succeeded by Charles Wilson
Council of the District of Columbia
Preceded by Kenyan McDuffie	Chair pro tempore of the Council of the District of Columbia; 2026–present	Incumbent
