= Matthew Frumin =

American politician

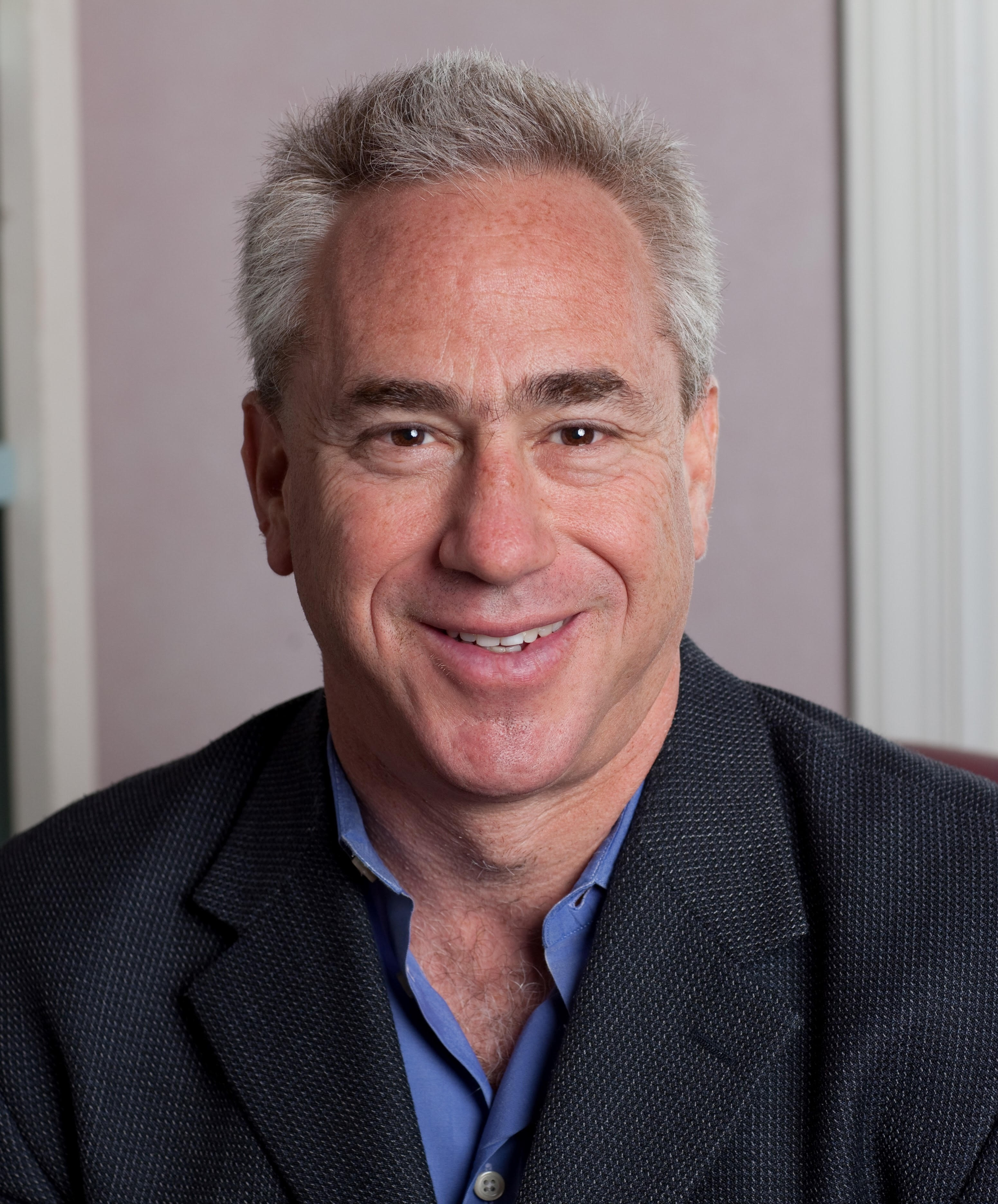

Member of the Council of the District of Columbia from Ward 3
- Incumbent
- Assumed office January 2, 2023
- Preceded by: Mary Cheh

Personal details
- Born: May 9, 1959 (age 67)
- Party: Democratic
- Education: University of Michigan (BA); George Washington University (JD)
- Website: Campaign website

Matthew Frumin (born May 9, 1959) is an American politician who serves as Ward 3 member of the Council of the District of Columbia. Previously he was an international trade attorney and was active on local education issues.

== Early life and education ==
Frumin grew up near Detroit, the son of a psychiatrist who later unsuccessfully ran for Congress.

== Career ==
Frumin served as a Clinton appointee in the State Department. He was a major fundraiser for Clinton, where he was a member of the fundraising group known as the "Saxophone Club". After leaving government, he worked as an international trade attorney and was a partner of the law firm Cassidy Levy Kent.

=== Politics ===
In 2000, Frumin was the Democratic nominee against Congressman Joe Knollenberg in Michigan's 11th congressional district. He lost by 15 points, though he fared better than his father, who had run against Knollenberg four years earlier in the solidly Republican district.

Frumin began his work in local DC politics through his ANC, serving as chair of 3E and various Council and mayoral taskforces. He was an advocate for improvements to public schools in Ward 3, including Janney Elementary, Deal Middle and Wilson High School. In 2013, Frumin ran for a vacant at-large seat on the DC Council after Phil Mendelson became chair of the Council. Frumin outraised many of his competitors, but came in fourth place with 11 percent of the vote. He was supported by filmmaker Aviva Kempner and wavered about whether he would hold outside employment if elected.

In 2022, following incumbent Mary Cheh's announcement that she would not seek another term, Frumin announced his candidacy. He won the June Democratic primary after three candidates dropped out days before the election to support his campaign. Frumin won the November general election with 76 percent of the vote.

Frumin has filed to run for a second term on the Council.

== Positions ==
In his 2022 campaign, Frumin said that "alleviating school overcrowding and increasing access to affordable housing" were "the most pressing issues facing Ward 3.

== Committees ==
Frumin serves on the following committees:

Committee on Executive Administration and Labor

Committee on Hospital and Health Equity

Committee on Transportation and the Environment

Committee on Facilities and Family Services

Committee on Housing

== Personal life ==
Frumin and his wife Lena have been married for 35 years live in American University Park. He has three adult children who all attended Woodrow Wilson High School (now called Jackson-Reed High School). He is active in the Washington Interfaith Network.

== Electoral history ==
2022 Council of the District of Columbia, Ward 3, Democratic Primary
Party	Candidate	Votes	%
Democratic	Matthew Frumin	8,012	42.28
Democratic	Eric Goulet	5,641	29.77
Democratic	Phil Thomas	1,087	5.74
Democratic	Beau Finley	958	5.06
Democratic	Tricia Duncan (withdrawn)	921	4.86
Democratic	Monte Monash	848	4.47
Democratic	Ben Bergmann (withdrawn)	753	3.97
Democratic	Deirdre Brown	517	2.73
Democratic	Henry Z Cohen (withdrawn)	194	1.02
Write-in		19	.1
Total votes		18,950	100.0
