= 2014 Council of the District of Columbia election =

US Election

- November 4, 2014

6 seats on the Council of the District of Columbia 7 seats needed for a majority
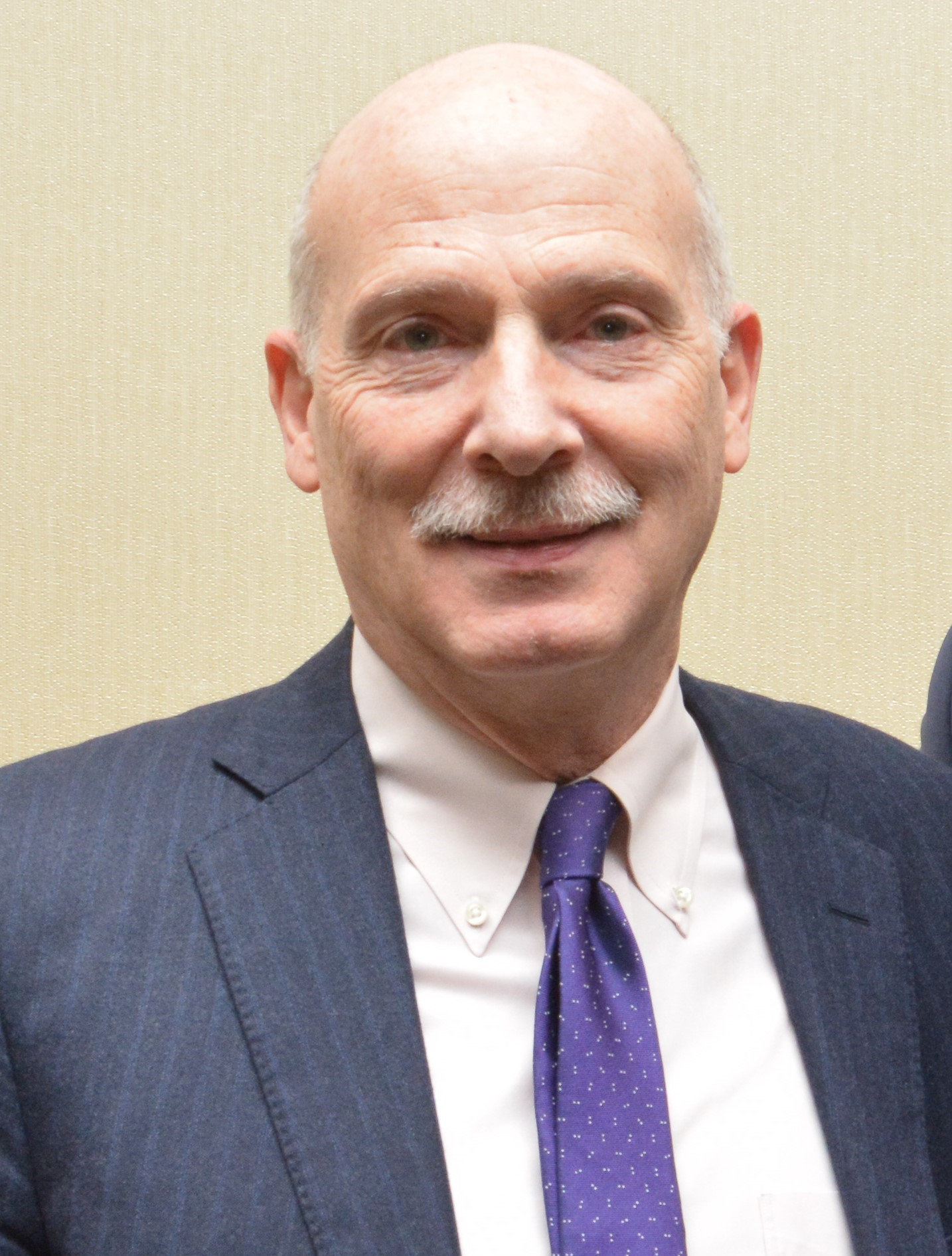

	Majority party	Minority party
Leader	Phil Mendelson
Party	Democratic	Independent
Last election	11	2
Seats after	11	2
Seat change	Steady	Steady
Chair of the Council before election
Phil Mendelson
Democratic
Elected Chair of the Council
Phil Mendelson
Democratic

The 2014 Council of the District of Columbia election was held on November 4, 2014, with primaries held on April 1. Elections were held in four of the eight wards, two at-large seats (one open to any party and one open to non-majority parties) as well as for the Chair of the Council of the District of Columbia. Prior to the election, 11 seats were held by Democrats and 2 seats were held by Independents. The general election saw no party flip any seats, thereby meaning that Democrats retained their majority on the council.

== Background ==
The council is composed of thirteen members, each elected by district residents to a four-year term. One member is elected from each of the district's eight wards. Four at-large members represent the district as a whole. The chairman of the council is likewise elected at an at-large basis. The terms of the at-large members are staggered so that two are elected every two years, and each D.C. resident may vote for two different at-large candidates in each general election.

According to the Home Rule Act, of the chair and the at-large members, a maximum of three may be affiliated with the majority political party. In the council's electoral history, of the elected members who were not affiliated with the majority party, most were elected as at-large members. In 2008 and 2012, Democrats such as David Grosso, Elissa Silverman, and Michael A. Brown changed their party affiliation to Independent when running for council.

To become a candidate for council an individual must be resident of the District of Columbia for at least one year prior to the general election, a registered voter, and hold no other public office for which compensation beyond expenses is received. Candidates running for a ward position must be a resident of that ward.

== Summary ==
Democrats remained the largest party on the council despite large turnover. At-large councilmember David Catania and Ward 6 councilmember Tommy Wells declined to run for re-election in favor of running for mayor, while Ward 1 councilmember Jim Graham lost his primary to Brianne Nadeau.

=== At-large ===
Position	Incumbent				Candidates
Position	Member	Party	First elected	Status	Candidates
Chairperson	Phil Mendelson	Democratic	2012 (special)	Incumbent re-elected.	▌ ✓ Phil Mendelson 82.4%; ▌ Kris Hammond 7.2%; ▌ John C. Cheeks 4.2%
At-large	Anita Bonds	Democratic	2013 (special)	Incumbent re-elected.	▌ ✓ Anita Bonds 31.3%; ▌ ✓ Elissa Silverman 15.1%; ▌ Michael D. Brown 10.5%; ▌ Robert White 8.1%; ▌ Courtney R. Snowden 7.2%; ▌ Eugene Puryear 4.6%
At-large	David Catania	Independent	2014	Incumbent declined to run. New member elected.	▌ ✓ Anita Bonds 31.3%; ▌ ✓ Elissa Silverman 15.1%; ▌ Michael D. Brown 10.5%; ▌ Robert White 8.1%; ▌ Courtney R. Snowden 7.2%; ▌ Eugene Puryear 4.6%

=== Wards ===
Position	Incumbent				Candidates
Position	Member	Party	First elected	Status	Candidates
Ward 1	Jim Graham	Democratic	1998	Incumbent lost re-election. New member elected. Democratic hold.	▌ ✓ Brianne Nadeau 84.8%; ▌ Ernest E. Johnson 10.1%; ▌ John Vaught LaBeaume 4.1%
Ward 3	Mary Cheh	Democratic	2006	Incumbent re-elected	▌ ✓ Mary Cheh 86.0%; ▌ Ryan Sabot 12.5%
Ward 5	Kenyan McDuffie	Democratic	2012 (special)	Incumbent re-elected	▌ ✓ Kenyan McDuffie 92.0%; ▌ Preston Cornish 7.1%
Ward 6	Tommy Wells	Democratic	2006	Incumbent retired. New member elected. Democratic hold.	▌ ✓ Charles Allen (Democratic) 87.6%; ▌ Pranav Badhwar 11.6%

== Chairperson ==
Incumbent Chairperson Phil Mendelson was re-elected for his first full term after defeating four challengers in the general election and one in the primary

2014 District of Columbia Chairperson of the Council Election
- November 4, 2014
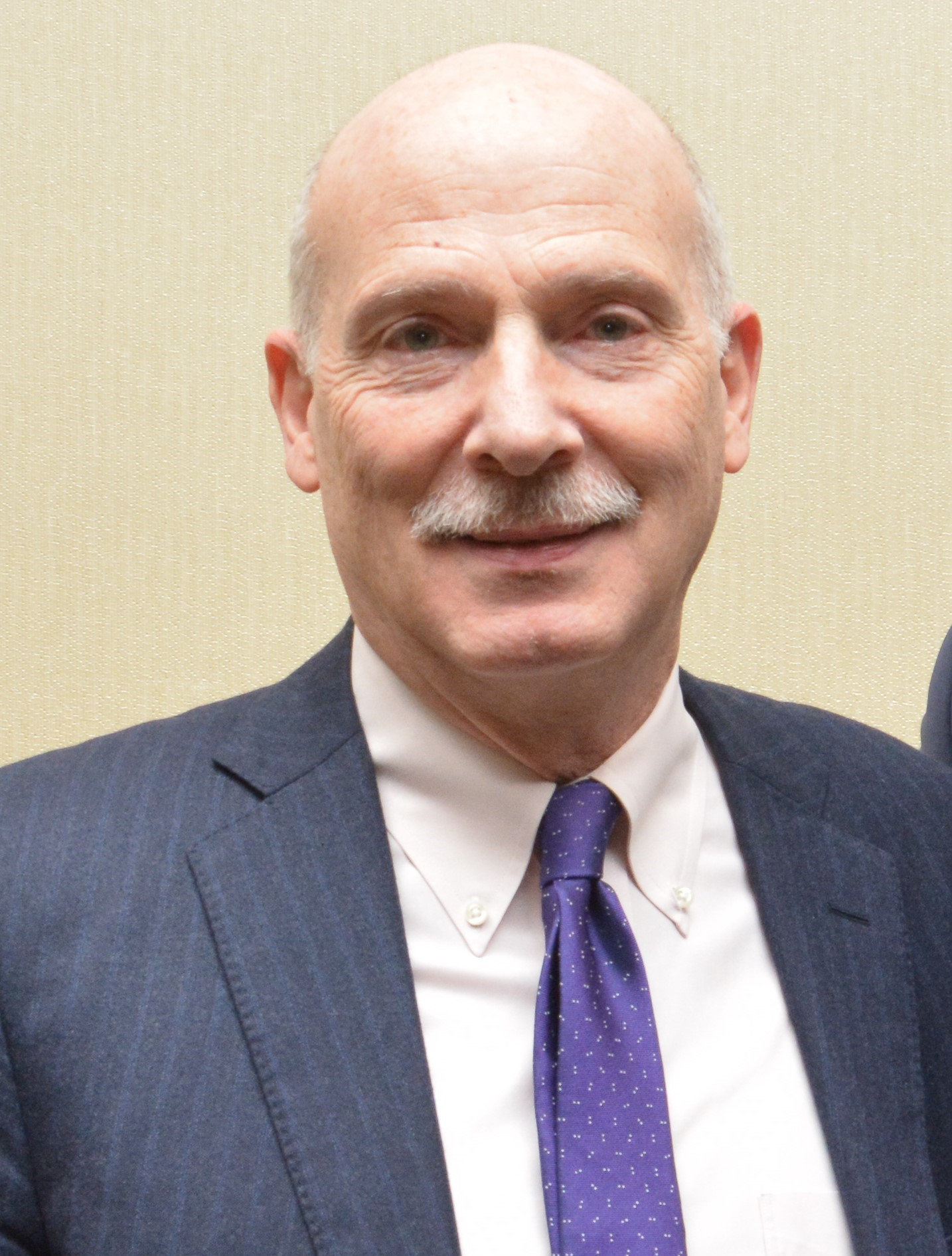

Nominee	Phil Mendelson	Kris Hammond	John C. Cheeks
Party	Democratic	Republican	Independent
Popular vote	138,066	12,114	6,949
Percentage	82.39%	7.23%	4.15%
Chairperson before election
Phil Mendelson
Democratic
Elected Chairperson
Phil Mendelson
Democratic

=== Democratic primary ===
Candidates

- Calvin H. Gurley
- Phil Mendelson, incumbent Chairperson (since 2012) from Eastern Market

Endorsements

Phil Mendelson

Labor unions

- United Food and Commercial Workers Local 400

Organizations

- Gay and Lesbian Activists Alliance
- Jews United for Justice
- Sierra Club

Publications

- Washington City Paper
- The Washington Post

2014 Council of the District of Columbia Chairperson Democratic primary
Party	Candidate	Votes	%
Democratic	Phil Mendelson (inc.)	69,138	81.20%
Democratic	Calvin H. Gurley	15,178	17.83%
Write-in		825	0.97%
Total votes		85,141	100%

=== Libertarian primary ===
No candidates filed for the primary, with Kyle Walker winning the nomination through write-in votes.

2014 Council of the District of Columbia Chairperson Libertarian primary
Party	Candidate	Votes	%
	Write-in	17	100%
Total votes		17	100%

=== Republican primary ===
No candidates filed for the primary, with Kris Hammond winning the nomination through write-in votes.

2014 Council of the District of Columbia Chairperson Republican primary
Party	Candidate	Votes	%
	Write-in	318	100%
Total votes		318	100%

=== Statehood Green primary ===
No candidates filed for the primary, with G. Lee Aikin winning the nomination through write-in votes.

2014 Council of the District of Columbia Chairperson Statehood Green primary
Party	Candidate	Votes	%
	Write-in	116	100%
Total votes		116	100%

=== Independents ===
Candidates

- John C. Cheeks

=== General election ===
2014 Council of the District of Columbia Chairperson election
Party	Candidate	Votes	%
Democratic	Phil Mendelson (inc.)	138,066	82.39%
Republican	Kris Hammond	12,114	7.23%
Independent	John C. Cheeks	6,949	7.26%
DC Statehood Green	G. Lee Aikin	5,930	3.54%
Libertarian	Kyle Walker	3,674	2.19%
Write-in		849	0.32%
Total votes		167,582	100%

== At-large ==
2014 Council of the District of Columbia At-large election
- November 4, 2014
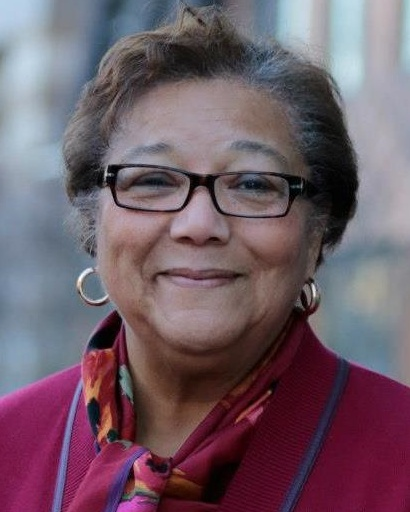

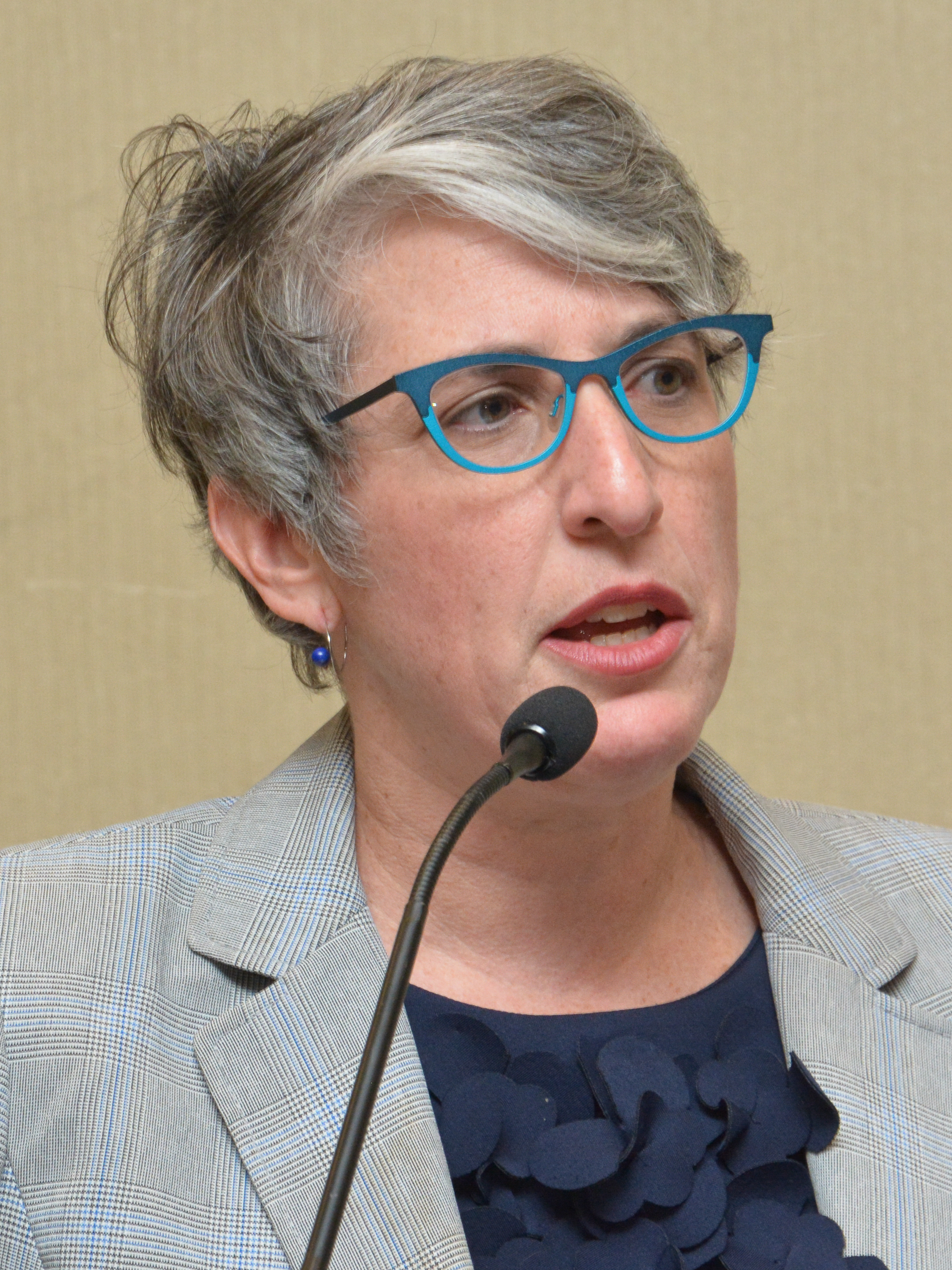

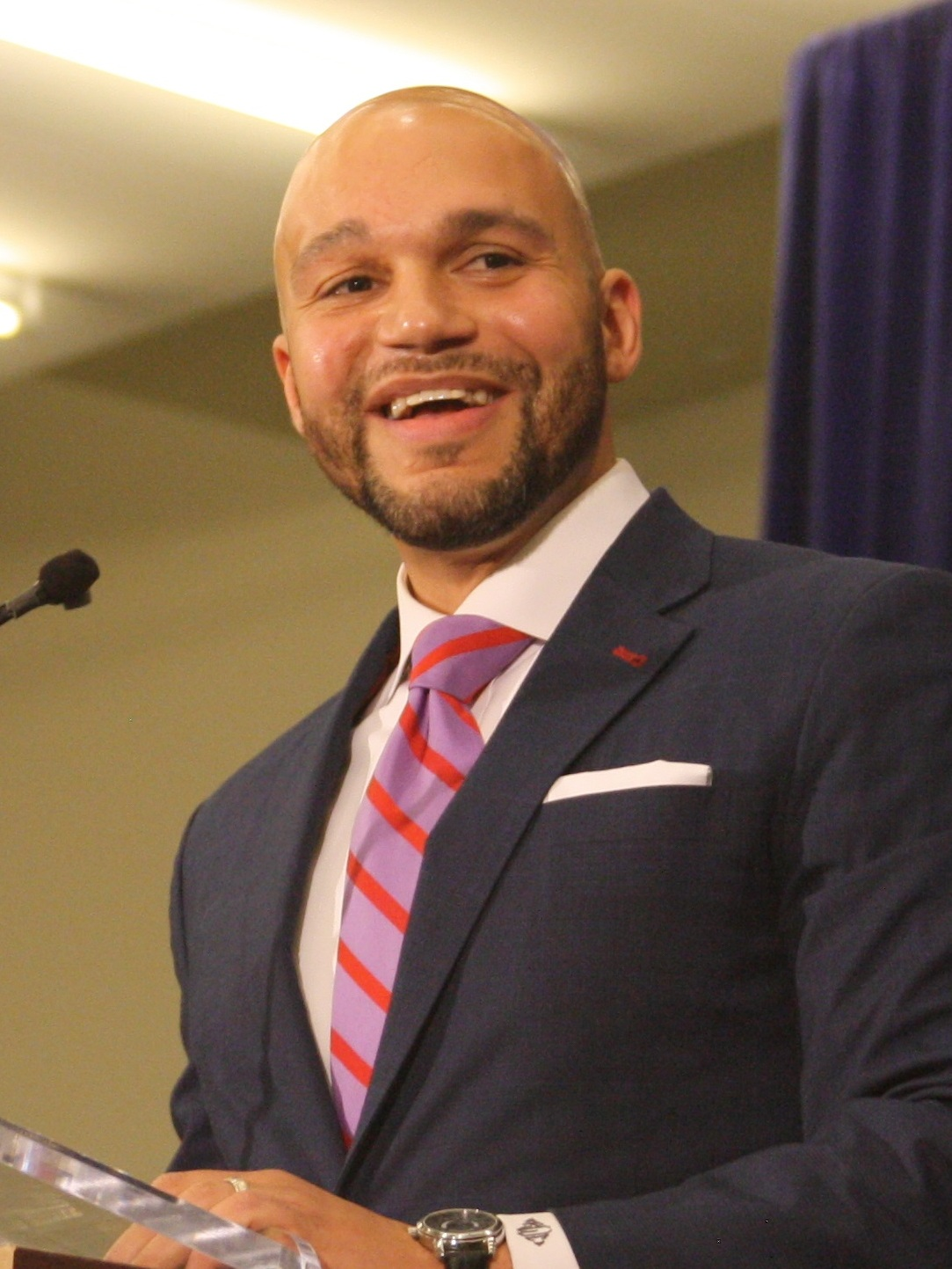

Nominee	Anita Bonds	Elissa Silverman	Michael D. Brown
Party	Democratic	Independent	Independent
Popular vote	85,575	41,300	28,614
Percentage	31.36%	15.14%	10.49%
Nominee	Robert White	Courtney R. Snowden	Eugene Puryear
Party	Independent	Independent	DC Statehood Green
Popular vote	22,198	19,551	12,525
Percentage	8.14%	7.16%	4.59%
Councilmembers before election
Anita Bonds (Dem.)
David Catania (Ind.)
Elected Councilmembers
Anita Bonds (Dem.)
Elissa Silverman (Ind.)

Incumbent Democrat Anita Bonds won re-election to her first full term after her victory in the 2013 special election. Independent incumbent David Catania declined to run for re-election in order to run in the 2014 mayoral election, with his seat being won by Elissa Silverman.

=== Democratic primary ===
Candidates

- Nate Bennett-Fleming
- Anita Bonds, incumbent at-large councilmember (since 2012)
- Pedro Rubio
- John F. Settles II
- Kevin Valentine Jr.

Endorsements

Anita Bonds

Labor unions

- International Association of Fire Fighters Local 36
- SEIU Local 32BJ

Local officials

- Marion Barry, former Mayor and incumbent Ward 8 Councilmember
- Muriel Bowser, incumbent Ward 4 Councilmember and mayoral candidate
- Sharon Pratt, former Mayor of Washington (1991-1995)

Organizations

- Gay and Lesbian Activists Alliance
- Hotel Association of Washington, DC
- National Nurses United
- National Organization for Women
- District of Columbia Chamber of Commerce
Nate Bennett-Fleming

Organizations

- Democracy for America
- Jews United for Justice (Democratic primary)
- Sierra Club (Democratic primary)

Publications

- The Washington Post (Democratic primary)

Polling

Poll source	Date(s) administered	Sample size (Note: Key: A – all adults RV – registered voters LV – likely voters V – unclear)	Margin of error	Nate Bennett-Fleming	Anita Bonds	Pedro Rubio	John Settles	Undecided
Washington City Paper/Kojo Nnamdi Show	March 13 – March 16, 2014	860 (LV)	± 3.4%	10%	43%	4%	6%	37%

2014 Council of the District of Columbia At-large Democratic primary
Party	Candidate	Votes	%
Democratic	Anita Bonds (inc.)	43,586	53.25%
Democratic	Nate Bennett-Fleming	18,232	22.27%
Democratic	John F. Settles II	10,775	13.16%
Democratic	Pedro Rubio	6,082	7.43%
Democratic	Kevin Valentine Jr.	2,560	3.13%
Write-in		624	1.42%
Total votes		81,859	100%

=== Libertarian primary ===
Candidates

- Frederick Steiner

2014 Council of the District of Columbia At-large Libertarian primary
Party	Candidate	Votes	%
Libertarian	Frederick Steiner	27	90.00%
Write-in		3	10.00%
Total votes		30	100%

=== Republican primary ===
Candidates

- Marc Morgan

2014 Council of the District of Columbia At-large Republican primary
Party	Candidate	Votes	%
Republican	Marc Morgan	1,136	93.27%
Write-in		82	6.73%
Total votes		1,218	100%

=== Statehood Green primary ===
Candidates

- G. Lee Aikin
- Eugene Puryear

Endorsements

Eugene Puryear

Labor unions

- American Federation of State, County and Municipal Employees Local 2401

Organizations

- Tenants' Advocacy Coalition

2014 Council of the District of Columbia At-large Statehood Green primary
Party	Candidate	Votes	%
DC Statehood Green	Eugene Puryear	268	64.89%
DC Statehood Green	G. Lee Aikin	112	27.12%
Write-in		33	7.99%
Total votes		413	100%

=== Independents ===
Candidates

- Michael D. Brown
- Wendell Felder, ANC member form 7E07
- Calvin H. Gurley
- Graylan Scott Hagler
- Brian Hart
- Eric J. Jones
- Kahlid Pitts
- Kishan Putta
- Elissa Silverman
- Courtney R. Snowden
- Robert White

Endorsements

Graylan Scott Hagler

Labor unions

- SEIU Local 1199
- UNITE HERE Local 25
- United Food and Commercial Workers Local 400
- Washington Teachers' Union

Organizations

- Jews United for Justice
- Working Families Party

Publications

- Washington City Paper
Eric J. Jones

Organizations

- Associated Builders and Contractors
- DC Chamber of Commerce
Khalid Pitts

Individuals

- Stephanie Cutter, Barack Obama 2008 presidential campaign strategist
- Ilyse Hogue, president of NARAL Pro-Choice America
- Cecile Richards, president of Planned Parenthood
- Joe Solmonese, former president of Human Rights Campaign
- Mitch Stewart, Barack Obama 2008 presidential campaign strategist

Organizations

- National Restaurant Association
Elissa Silverman

Labor unions

- International Association of Fire Fighters Local 36
- Jews United for Justice
- Metropolitan Police Department Union
- Metropolitan Washington Labor Council, AFL–CIO
- SEIU Local 32 & 1199
- UNITE HERE Local 25
- United Food and Commercial Workers Local 400

Local officials

- Charles Allen, candidate for Ward 6 Councilmember
- Marion Barry, former Mayor and incumbent Ward 8 Councilmember

Organizations

- DC For Democracy
- Greater Greater Washington
- National Organization for Women
- Sierra Club
- Washington Teachers' Union
- Working Families Party

Publications

- The Washington Post
- Washington City Paper
Courtney R. Snowden

Organizations

- Capital Stonewall Democrats
- LGBTQ Victory Fund
- Apartment and Office Building Association

Publications

- The Washington Post
Robert White

Labor Unions

- American Federation of State, County and Municipal Employees District Council 20

Local officials

- Yvette Alexander, incumbent Ward 7 Councilmember
- Peggy Cooper Cafritz, former president of the DC State Board of Education
- David Grosso, incumbent At-large Councilmember
- Kenyan McDuffie, incumbent Ward 5 Councilmember

Organizations

- DC Association of Realtors
- Greater Greater Washington
- Hotel Association of Washington, DC
- Sierra Club

Publications

- The Washington Post

=== General Election ===
2014 Council of the District of Columbia At-large election
Party	Candidate	Votes	%
Democratic	Anita Bonds (inc.)	85,575	31.36%
Independent	Elissa Silverman	41,300	15.14%
Independent	Michael D. Brown	28,614	10.49%
Independent	Robert White	22,198	8.14%
Independent	Courtney R. Snowden	19,551	7.16%
DC Statehood Green	Eugene Puryear	12,525	4.59%
Independent	Graylan Scott Hagler	10,539	3.86%
Independent	Khalid Pitts	10,392	3.81%
Republican	Marc Morgan	9,947	3.65%
Independent	Brian Hart	8,993	3.27%
Independent	Calvin H. Gurley	4,553	1.67%
Independent	Eric J. Jones	4,405	1.61%
Libertarian	Frederick Steiner	3,766	1.38%
Independent	Wendell Felder	2,964	1.09%
Write-in		1,472	0.54%
Total votes		272,869	100%

== Ward 1 ==
2014 District of Columbia Ward 1 Election
- November 4, 2014
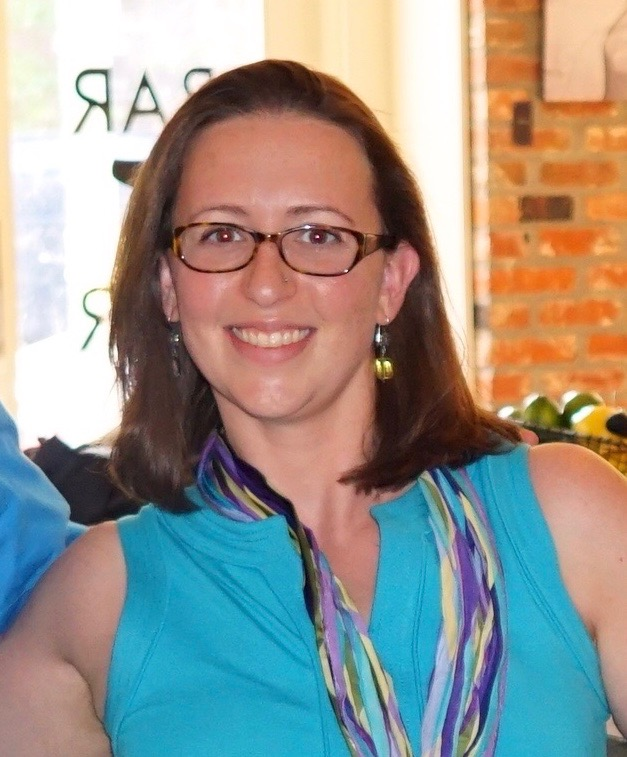

Nominee	Brianne Nadeau	Ernest E. Johnson	John Vaught LaBeaume
Party	Democratic	Independent	Libertarian
Popular vote	17,024	2,021	829
Percentage	84.78%	10.06%	4.13%
Councilmember before election
Jim Graham
Democratic
Elected Councilmember
Brianne Nadeau
Democratic

12-year councilmember Jim Graham lost his primary to challenger Brianne Nadeau. Graham had faced multiple different corruption allegations in his previous term. Ted Loza, then Graham's chief of staff, was arrested by the FBI on bribery charges in September 2009 and eventually sentenced to eight months in prison.

=== Democratic primary ===
Candidates

- Jim Graham, incumbent Ward 1 Councilmember
- Brianne Nadeau

Withdrawn

- Bryan Weaver
- Beverly Wheeler

Endorsements

Jim Graham

Labor Unions

- United Food and Commercial Workers Local 400

Organizations

- Sierra Club (Democratic primary)
Brianne Nadeau

Individuals

- Beverly Wheeler, withdrawn candidate

Local officials

- David Grosso, incumbent At-large Councilmember (Independent)
- Tommy Wells, incumbent Ward 6 Councilmember

Organizations

- Democracy for America
- Gay and Lesbian Activists Alliance
- Greater Greater Washington
- Jews United for Justice

Publications

- Washington City Paper
- The Washington Post

2014 Council of the District of Columbia Ward 1 Democratic primary
Party	Candidate	Votes	%
Democratic	Brianne Nadeau	6,688	58.73%
Democratic	Jim Graham (inc.)	4,642	40.77%
Write-in		57	0.50%
Total votes		11,387	100%

=== Libertarian primary ===
No candidates filed for the primary, with John Vaught LaBeaume winning the nomination through write-in votes.

2014 Council of the District of Columbia Chairperson Libertarian primary
Party	Candidate	Votes	%
	Write-in	2	100%
Total votes		2	100%

=== Independents ===
Candidates

- Ernest E. Johnson

=== General Election ===
2014 Council of the District of Columbia Ward 1 election
Party	Candidate	Votes	%
Democratic	Brianne Nadeau	17,024	84.78%
Independent	Ernest E. Johnson	2,021	7.26%
Libertarian	John Vaught LaBeaume	829	2.19%
Write-in		207	1.03%
Total votes		20,081	100%

== Ward 3 ==
2014 District of Columbia Ward 3 Election
- November 4, 2014
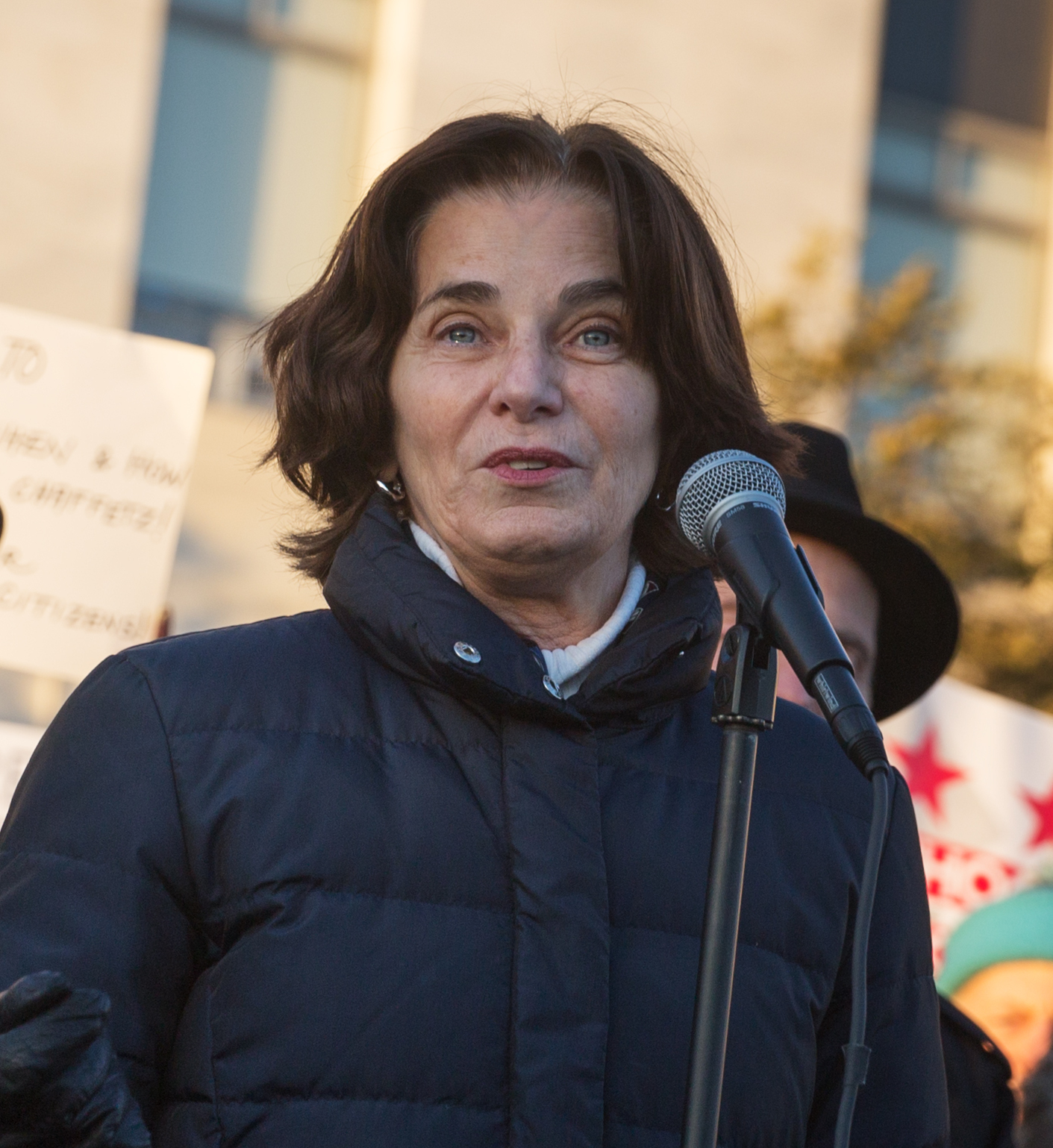

Nominee	Mary Cheh	Ryan Sabot
Party	Democratic	Libertarian
Popular vote	20,314	2,940
Percentage	86.01%	12.45%
Councilmember before election
Mary Cheh
Democratic
Elected Councilmember
Mary Cheh
Democratic

Incumbent councilmember Mary Cheh easily won re-election to a third term, facing no opposition in the Democratic primary.

=== Democratic primary ===
Candidates

- Mary Cheh, incumbent councilmember

Endorsements

Mary Cheh

Organizations

- Gay and Lesbian Activists Alliance
- Greater Greater Washington
- Jews United for Justice
- Sierra Club

Publications

- Washington City Paper

2014 Council of the District of Columbia Ward 3 Democratic primary
Party	Candidate	Votes	%
Democratic	Mary Cheh (inc.)	11,484	95.80%
Write-in		503	4.20%
Total votes		11,987	100%

=== Libertarian primary ===
Candidates

- Ryan Sabot

2014 Council of the District of Columbia Ward 3 Libertarian primary
Party	Candidate	Votes	%
Libertarian	Ryan Sabot	2	100%
Total votes		2	100%

=== General Election ===
2014 Council of the District of Columbia Ward 3 election
Party	Candidate	Votes	%
Democratic	Mary Cheh (inc.)	20,314	86.01%
Libertarian	Ryan Sabot	2,940	12.45%
Write-in		365	1.55%
Total votes		23,619	100%

== Ward 5 ==
2014 District of Columbia Ward 5 Election
- November 4, 2014
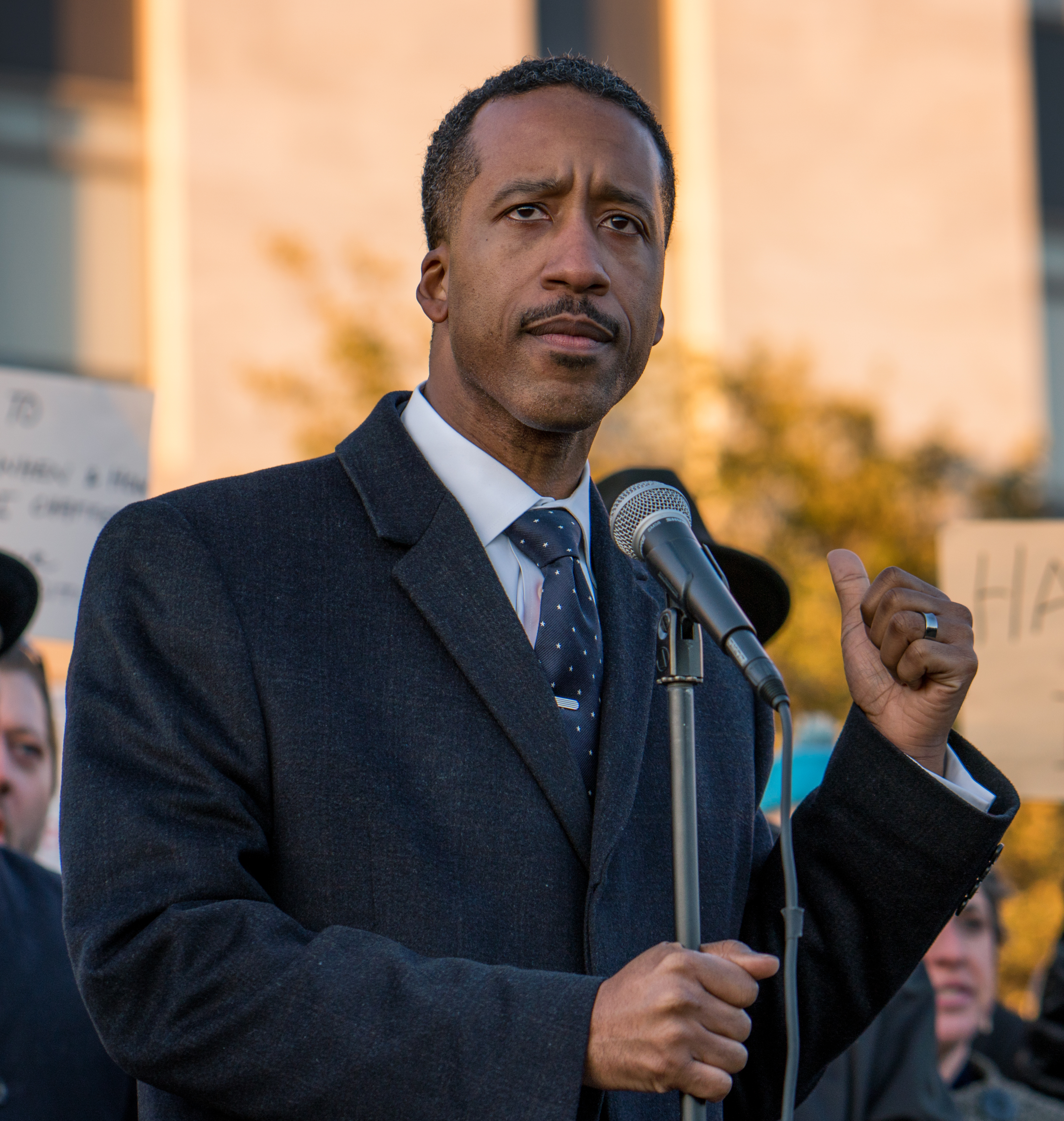

Nominee	Kenyan McDuffie	Preston Cornish
Party	Democratic	Libertarian
Popular vote	19,290	1,488
Percentage	91.96%	7.09%
Councilmember before election
Kenyan McDuffie
Democratic
Elected Councilmember
Kenyan McDuffie
Democratic

Incumbent councilmember Kenyan McDuffie easily won re-election to his first full term following his victory in the 2012 special election, facing little opposition in both the Democratic primary and the general election

=== Democratic primary ===
Candidates

- Kathy Henderson, activist and ANC member from Carver Langston
- Kenyan McDuffie, incumbent Ward 5 Councilmember
- Carolyn C. Steptoe, ANC member from Brookland

Withdrawn

- Jacqueline Manning

Endorsements

Kenyan McDuffie

Labor unions

- United Food and Commercial Workers Local 400

Organizations

- Gay and Lesbian Activists Alliance
- Greater Greater Washington
- Jews United for Justice
- Sierra Club

Publications

- Washington City Paper
- The Washington Post

2014 Council of the District of Columbia Ward 5 Democratic primary
Party	Candidate	Votes	%
Democratic	Kenyan McDuffie (inc.)	9,532	78.36%
Democratic	Kathy Henderson	1,822	14.98%
Democratic	Carolyn C. Steptoe	755	6.21%
Write-in		56	4.20%
Total votes		12,165	100%

=== Libertarian primary ===
No candidates filed for the primary, with Preston Cornish winning the nomination through write-in votes.

2014 Council of the District of Columbia Ward 5 Libertarian primary
Party	Candidate	Votes	%
	Write-in	1	100%
Total votes		1	100%

=== General Election ===
2014 Council of the District of Columbia Ward 5 election
Party	Candidate	Votes	%
Democratic	Kenyan McDuffie (inc.)	19,290	91.96%
Libertarian	Preston Cornish	1,488	7.09%
Write-in		199	0.95%
Total votes		20,977	100%

== Ward 6 ==
2014 District of Columbia Ward 6 Election
- November 4, 2014
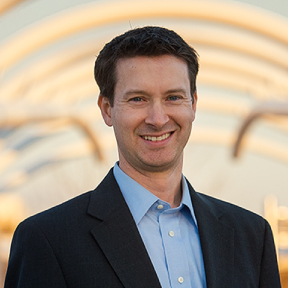

Nominee	Charles Allen	Pranav Badhwar
Party	Democratic	Libertarian
Popular vote	23,668	3,127
Percentage	87.56%	11.57%
Councilmember before election
Tommy Wells
Democratic
Elected Councilmember
Charles Allen
Democratic

Incumbent councilmember Tommy Wells declined to run for a third term in order to run in the 2014 mayoral election. Charles Allen ran and won a close Democratic primary election on the way to blowing out Libertarian candidate Pranav Badhwar in the general election.

=== Democratic primary ===
Allen was the chief of staff of Ward 6 Council Member Tommy Wells. After Wells decided not to run for reelection in order to run for mayor, Allen resigned from his position and announced his candidacy to succeed Wells seat in the Council representing Ward 6. Darrel Thompson, a former deputy chief of staff of Senate Majority Leader Harry Reid, was the only other democratic entrant. This was only the second time since the formation of the Council that the Ward 6 Democratic primary did not have an incumbent during a normal election cycle, the only other time being the election of Allen's former boss Wells in 2006.

Candidates

- Charles Allen, chief of staff to incumbent councilmember Tommy Wells
- Darrel Thompson, former deputy chief of staff to Senator Harry Reid

Endorsements

Charles Allen

Labor unions

- * Metropolitan Police Department Union
- Service Employees International Union locals 32BJ, 500, 722, 1199

Local officials

- Sharon Ambrose, former Ward 6 Councilmember (1997-2007)
- David Grosso, incumbent At-large Councilmember (Independent)
- Lisa Raymond, former member of the District of Columbia State Board of Education from Ward 6
- Monica Warren-Jones, member of the District of Columbia State Board of Education from Ward 6
- Tommy Wells, incumbent Ward 6 Councilmember

Organizations

- Democracy for America
- District of Columbia Association of Realtors
- District of Columbia Chamber of Commerce
- Gay and Lesbian Activists Alliance
- Greater Greater Washington
- Jews United for Justice
- National Organization for Women
- Sierra Club

Publications

- Washington City Paper
- The Washington Post
Darrel Thompson

Federal officials

- Dick Gephardt, former MO-3 Representative (1977-2005), House Majority leader (1989-1995) and minority leader (1995-2003)
- John Lewis, GA-5 Representative (1987-2020)
- Harry Reid, Senator from Nevada (1987-2017) and Senate Majority Leader (2007-2015)

Labor unions

- United Food and Commercial Workers Local 400

Debates

Debates and forums for Ward 6 Democratic primary candidates
Date	Place	Host	Participants		
P Participant. I Invitee. A Absent. N Confirmed non-invitee. O Out of race (exploring, suspended, or not yet entered)			Allen	Badhwar (Note: Due to District of Columbia general elections being overwhelmingly dominated by the Democratic party, some notionally partisan forums invite candidates from other political parties to give them a chance to speak and engage with Democratic candidates.)	Thompson
20 February 2014	Capitol Hill Presbyterian Church	Eastern Market Metro Community Organization	P	P	P
28 February 2014	Hill Center	Hill Rag	P	A	P
4 March 2014	Westminster Presbyterian Church	Hill Rag	P	A	P
11 March 2014	Shaw Library	Hill Rag	P	A	P
25 March 2014	Rock N Roll Hotel	Washington City Paper	P	A	P

2014 Council of the District of Columbia Ward 6 Democratic primary
Party	Candidate	Votes	%
Democratic	Charles Allen	8,851	58.16%
Democratic	Darrel Thompson	6,329	41.59%
Write-in		38	0.25%
Total votes		15,218	100%

=== Libertarian primary ===
Candidates

- Parnav Badhwar

2014 Council of the District of Columbia Ward 6 Libertarian primary
Party	Candidate	Votes	%
Libertarian	Parnav Badhwar	8	100%
Total votes		8	100%

=== Independents ===
- Shelonda Tillman

=== General Election ===
2014 Council of the District of Columbia Ward 6 election
Party	Candidate	Votes	%
Democratic	Charles Allen	23,668	87.56%
Libertarian	Pranav Bahdwar	3,127	11.57%
Write-in		237	0.88%
Total votes		27,032	100%
