= 2012 Council of the District of Columbia special election =

- May 15th, 2012
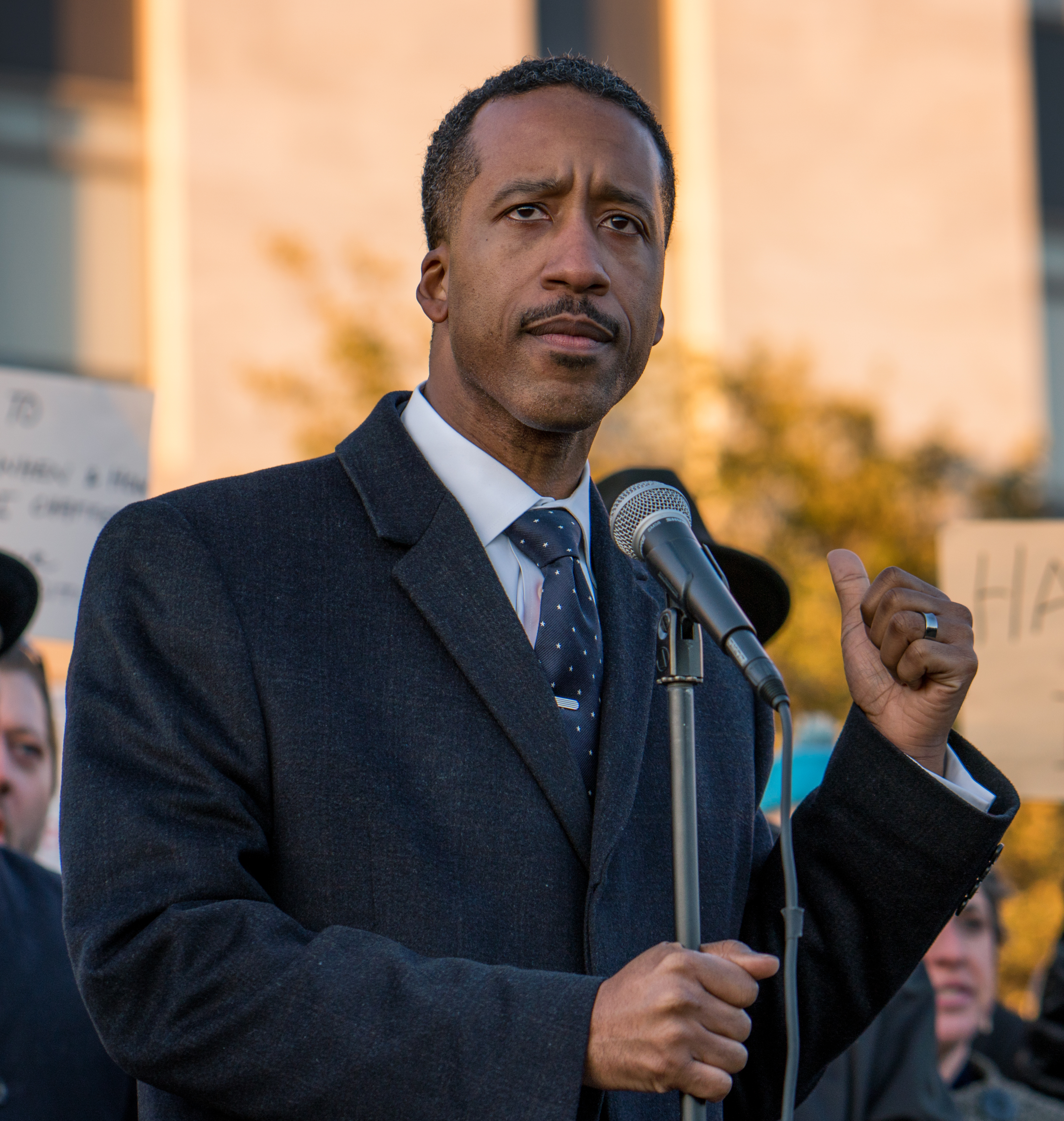

Nominee	Kenyan McDuffie	Delano Hunter	Frank Wilds
Party	Democratic	Democratic	Democratic
Popular vote	4,529	2,190	1,493
Percentage	43.58%	21.07%	14.37%
Nominee	Tim Day	Ron L. Magnus	Shelly Gardner
Party	Republican	Democratic	Democratic
Popular vote	592	434	273
Percentage	5.70%	4.18%	2.63%
Councilmember before election
vacant
Elected Councilmember
Kenyan McDuffie
Democratic

The 2012 Council of the District of Columbia special election was held on May 15, 2012, to elect the Ward 5 Councilmember to the Council of the District of Columbia. The election was called following the resignation of incumbent councilmember Harry Thomas Jr. due to his indictment on federal charges of embezzlement.

== Background ==
Harry Thomas Jr. had served on Council since 2006 as the councilmember for Ward 5, winning an open primary of 11 candidates following then-incumbent councilmember Vincent Orange's decision to run for mayor. Throughout 2011, Thomas had been the subject of multiple investigations at both the city and federal level regarding misuse of city funds for personal use. He resigned from the Council on January 5th, 2012, hours after federal prosecutors filed criminal charges of embezzlement and filing false tax returns.

Thomas' resignation left the Ward 5 seat on the Council vacant, and a special election to elect a new councilmember was scheduled for May 15th, 2012.

== Candidates ==
- John C. Cheeks, perennial candidate
- Tim Day, Brookland accountant
- Kathy Henderson, Carver Langston activist
- Drew E. Hubbard, Woodridge lawyer and former Council staffer
- Delano Hunter, Gateway activist and 2010 candidate for Ward 5 councilmember
- Shelly Gardner, Langdon lawyer
- Ron L. Magnus, Brookland lawyer
- Ruth E. Marshall, Queens Chapel activist and businesswoman
- Kenyan McDuffie, 2010 candidate for Ward 5 councilmember and lawyer
- Frank Wilds, Riggs Park businessman
- Rae Zapata, Brookland activist

Withdrawn

- Robert Albrecht, Brookland business owner
- William Boston
- Amanda Broadnax, Carver Langston consultant
- John Salatti, Bloomingdale activist

Disqualified

- Angel Sherri Alston
- Bessie M. Newell

Debates

Debates and forums for Ward 5 special election candidates
Date	Place	Host	Participants											
P Participant. I Invitee. A Absent. N Confirmed non-invitee. O Out of race (exploring, suspended, or not yet entered)			Broadnax	Cheeks	Day	Henderson	Hubbard	Hunter	Gardner	Magnus	Marshall	McDuffie	Wilds	Zapata
3 March 2012	Pryzbyla Center, Catholic University of America	Brookland Heartbeat, WTOP	N	N	P	P	N	P	N	N	N	P	P	N

Endorsements

Tim Day

Organizations

- DC Log Cabin Republicans
- LGBTQ Victory Fund

Publications

- The Washington Post
Delano Hunter

Labor unions

- American Federation of State, County and Municipal Employees local 20
Kenyan McDuffie

Individuals

- Amanda Broadnax, withdrawn candidate

Labor unions

- UNITE HERE local 25
- Service Employees International Union Maryland & DC State Council

Local Officials

- Tommy Wells, incumbent Ward 6 Councilmember (since 2007)

Organizations

- Capital Stonewall Democrats
- DC Latino Caucus
- Greater Greater Washington
- National Nurses United
- Sierra Club

== General election ==
2012 Council of the District of Columbia special election
Party	Candidate	Votes	%
Democratic	Kenyan McDuffie	4,529	43.58%
Democratic	Delano Hunter	2,190	21.07%
Democratic	Frank Wilds	1,493	14.37%
Republican	Tim Day	592	5.70%
Democratic	Ron L. Magnus	434	4.18%
Democratic	Shelly Gardner	273	2.63%
Democratic	Kathy Henderson	257	2.47%
Democratic	Drew E. Hubbard	235	2.26%
Democratic	Rae Zapata	199	1.91%
Democratic	Ruth E. Marshall	78	0.75%
Independent	John C. Cheeks	57	0.55%
Democratic	Amanda Broadnax (withdrawn)	25	0.24%
Write-in		31	0.30%
Total votes		10,393	100%
