= 2010 Council of the District of Columbia election =

US Election

- November 2, 2010

7 seats on the Council of the District of Columbia 7 seats needed for a majority
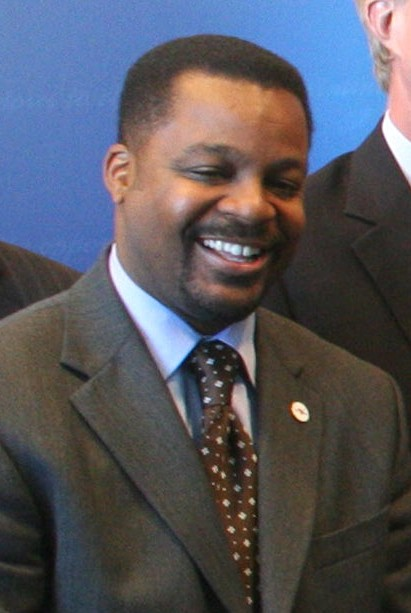

	Majority party	Minority party
Leader	Kwame Brown
Party	Democratic	Independent
Last election	11	2
Seats after	11	2
Seat change	Steady	Steady
Chair of the Council before election
Vincent Gray
Democratic
Elected Chair of the Council
Kwame Brown
Democratic

The 2010 Council of the District of Columbia election was held on November 2, 2010, with primaries held on September 14. Elections were held in four of the eight wards, two at-large seats (one open to any party and one open to non-majority parties) as well as for the chair of the Council of the District of Columbia. Prior to the election, 11 seats were held by Democrats and 2 seats were held by Independents. The general election saw no party flip any seats, thereby meaning that Democrats retained their majority on the council.

== Background ==
The council is composed of thirteen members, each elected by district residents to a four-year term. One member is elected from each of the district's eight wards. Four at-large members represent the district as a whole. The chairman of the council is likewise elected at an at-large basis. The terms of the at-large members are staggered so that two are elected every two years, and each D.C. resident may vote for two different at-large candidates in each general election.

According to the Home Rule Act, of the chair and the at-large members, a maximum of three may be affiliated with the majority political party. In the council's electoral history, of the elected members who were not affiliated with the majority party, most were elected as at-large members. In 2008 and 2012, Democrats such as David Grosso, Elissa Silverman, and Michael A. Brown changed their party affiliation to Independent when running for council.

To become a candidate for council an individual must be resident of the District of Columbia for at least one year prior to the general election, a registered voter, and hold no other public office for which compensation beyond expenses is received. Candidates running for a ward position must be a resident of that ward.

== Summary ==
=== At-large ===
Position	Incumbent				Candidates
Position	Member	Party	First elected	Status	Candidates
Chairperson	Vincent Gray	Democratic	2006	Incumbent declined to run. New member elected. Democratic hold.	▌ ✓ Kwame Brown 87.8%; ▌ Ann C. Wilcox 10.2%
At-large	Phil Mendelson	Democratic	1998	Incumbent re-elected.	▌ ✓ Phil Mendelson 56.4%; ▌ ✓ David Catania 30.6%; ▌ David Schwartzman 6.8%; ▌ Richard Urban 5.2%%
At-large	David Catania	Independent	1997 (special)	Incumbent re-elected.	▌ ✓ Phil Mendelson 56.4%; ▌ ✓ David Catania 30.6%; ▌ David Schwartzman 6.8%; ▌ Richard Urban 5.2%%

=== Wards ===
Position	Incumbent				Candidates
Position	Member	Party	First elected	Status	Candidates
Ward 1	Jim Graham	Democratic	1998	Incumbent re-elected	▌ ✓ Jim Graham 81.3%; ▌ Nancy Shia 9.4%; ▌ Marc Morgan 7.7%
Ward 3	Mary Cheh	Democratic	2006	Incumbent re-elected	▌ ✓ Mary Cheh 65.0%; ▌ Dave Hedgepeth 34.0%
Ward 5	Harry Thomas Jr.	Democratic	2006	Incumbent re-elected	▌ ✓ Harry Thomas Jr. 83.9%; ▌ Kathy Henderson 9.1%; ▌ Tim Day 5.9%
Ward 6	Tommy Wells	Democratic	2006	Incumbent re-elected	▌ ✓ Tommy Wells 85.2%; ▌ Jim DeMartino 14.0%

== Chairperson ==
2010 District of Columbia Chairperson of the Council Election
- November 2, 2010
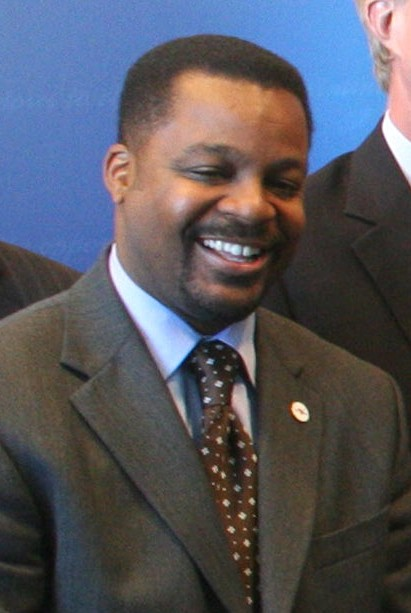

Nominee	Kwame Brown	Ann C. Wilcox
Party	Democratic	DC Statehood Green
Popular vote	111,695	12,979
Percentage	87.75%	10.20%
Chairperson before election
Vincent Gray
Democratic
Elected Chairperson
Kwame Brown
Democratic

Incumbent Chairperson Vincent Gray declined to run again in order to run for Mayor of the District of Columbia. Incumbent Democratic At-large Councilmember Kwame Brown was elected for his first term as chairman of the Council after defeating two challengers in the general election and one in the primary.

=== Democratic primary ===
Candidates

- Kwame Brown, incumbent Democratic At-large Councilmember
- Dorothy Douglas
- Vincent Orange, former Ward 5 Councilmember

Endorsements

Kwame Brown

Local Officials

- Mary Cheh, incumbent Ward 3 Councilmember
- Harry Thomas Jr., incumbent Ward 5 Councilmember

Organizations

- Capital Stonewall Democrats
- District of Columbia Chamber of Commerce
- Sierra Club
Vincent Orange

Publications

- The Washington Post

2010 Council of the District of Columbia Chairperson Democratic primary
Party	Candidate	Votes	%
Democratic	Kwame Brown	68,320	55.18%
Democratic	Vincent Orange	47,754	38.57%
Democratic	Dorothy Douglas	6,922	5.59%
Write-in		812	0.66%
Total votes		123,808	100%

=== Statehood Green primary ===
Candidates

- Ann C. Wilcox

2010 Council of the District of Columbia Chairperson Statehood Green primary
Party	Candidate	Votes	%
DC Statehood Green	Ann C. Wilcox	411	82.86%
Write-in		85	100%
Total votes		496	100%

=== General election ===
2010 Council of the District of Columbia Chairperson election
Party	Candidate	Votes	%
Democratic	Kwame Brown	111,695	87.75%
DC Statehood Green	Ann C. Wilcox	12,979	10.20%
Write-in		2,618	2.06%
Total votes		127,292	100%

== At-large ==
2010 Council of the District of Columbia At-large election
- November 2, 2010
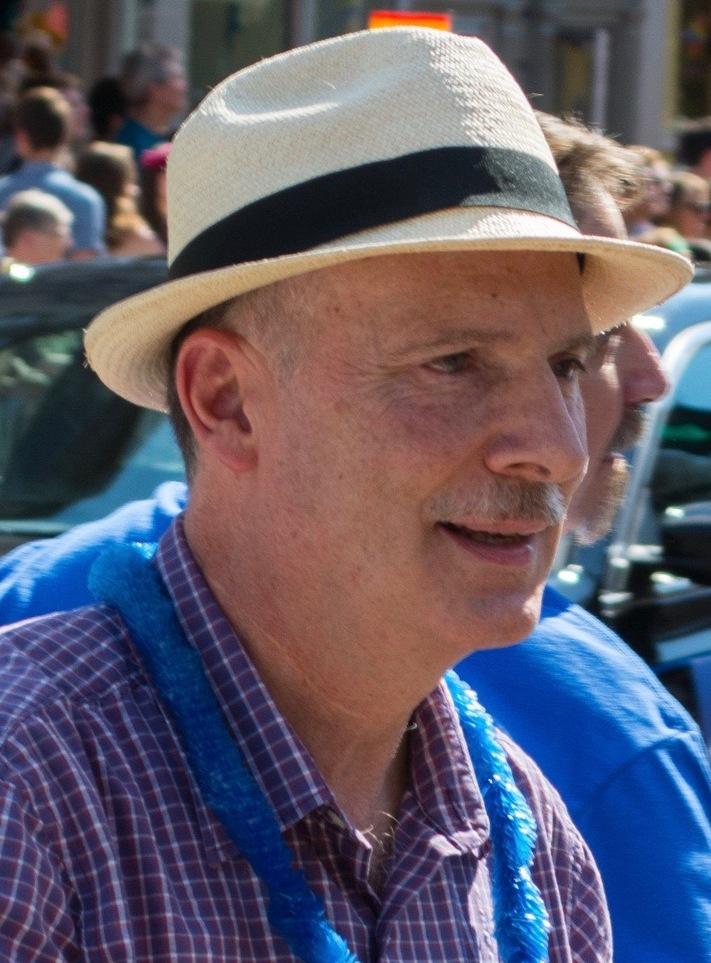

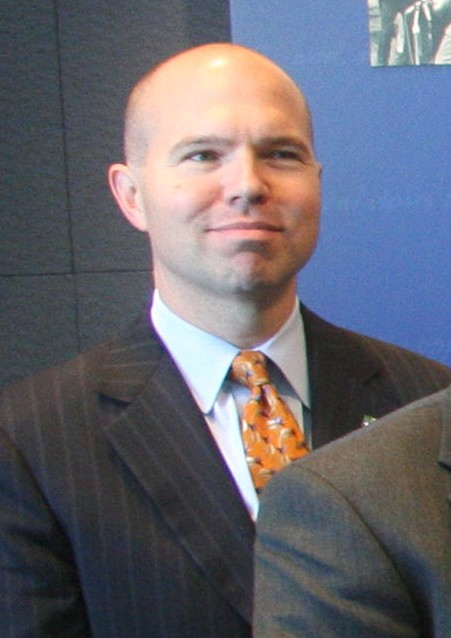

Nominee	Phil Mendelson	David Catania
Party	Democratic	Independent
Popular vote	105,296	57,163
Percentage	56.41%	30.62%
Nominee	David Schwartzman	Richard Urban
Party	DC Statehood Green	Independent
Popular vote	12,697	9,668
Percentage	6.80%	5.18%
Councilmembers before election
Phil Mendelson (Dem.)
David Catania (Ind.)
Elected Councilmembers
Phil Mendelson (Dem.)
David Catania (Ind.)

Both incumbents, Democrat Phil Mendelson and Independent David Catania, won re-election to their fourth full terms.

=== Democratic primary ===
Candidates

- Michael D. Brown, incumbent DC Shadow Senator
- Phil Mendelson, incumbent Democratic At-large Councilmember (since 1999)
- Clark Ray

Endorsements

Phil Mendelson

Local officials

- Michael A. Brown, incumbent Independent At-large Councilmember

Organizations

- Capital Stonewall Democrats
- Greater Greater Washington

2010 Council of the District of Columbia At-large Democratic primary
Party	Candidate	Votes	%
Democratic	Phil Mendelson (inc.)	77,127	62.56%
Democratic	Michael D. Brown	34,829	28.25%
Democratic	Clark Ray	10,688	8.67%
Write-in		649	1.42%
Total votes		123,293	100%

=== Statehood Green primary ===
Candidates

- Darryl L. C. Moch
- David Schwartzman

2010 Council of the District of Columbia At-large Statehood Green primary
Party	Candidate	Votes	%
DC Statehood Green	David Schwartzman	326	62.33%
DC Statehood Green	Darryl L. C. Moch	142	27.15%
Write-in		55	10.52%
Total votes		523	100%

=== Independents ===
Candidates

- David Catania, incumbent Independent At-large Councilmember (since 1998)
- Richard Urban

=== General Election ===
2010 Council of the District of Columbia At-large election
Party	Candidate	Votes	%
Democratic	Phil Mendelson (inc.)	105,296	56.41%
Independent	David Catania	57,163	30.62%
DC Statehood Green	David Schwartzman	12,697	6.80%
Independent	Richard Urban	9,668	5.18%
Write-in		1,839	0.99%
Total votes		186,663	100%

== Ward 1 ==
2010 District of Columbia Ward 1 Election
- November 4, 2010
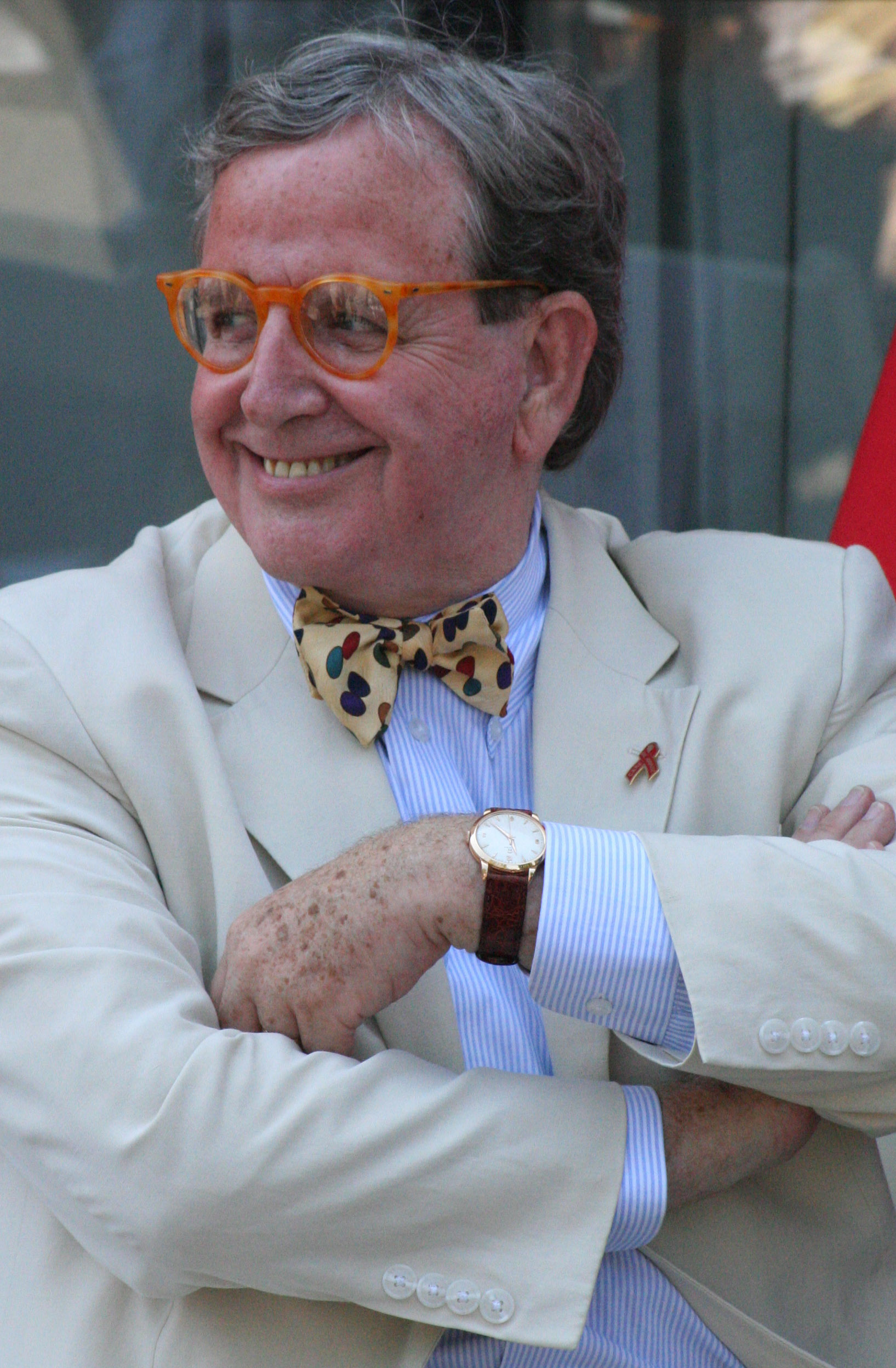

Nominee	Jim Graham	Nancy Shia	Marc Morgan
Party	Democratic	DC Statehood Green	Republican
Popular vote	11,946	1,376	1,137
Percentage	81.31%	9.37%	7.74%
Councilmember before election
Jim Graham
Democratic
Elected Councilmember
Jim Graham
Democratic

Incumbent councilmember Jim Graham was re-elected to a fourth full term.

=== Democratic primary ===
Candidates

- Jim Graham, incumbent Ward 1 Councilmember
- Jeff Smith
- Bryan Weaver

Endorsements

Jim Graham

Labor unions

- Amalgamated Transit Union local 689
- UNITE HERE local 25

Organizations

- Capital Stonewall Democrats
- Sierra Club

Publications

- The Washington Post
Jeff Smith

Labor unions

- Baltimore-D.C. Metro Building Trades Council

Organizations

- District of Columbia Chamber of Commerce

2010 Council of the District of Columbia Ward 1 Democratic primary
Party	Candidate	Votes	%
Democratic	Jim Graham (inc.)	8,381	56.88%
Democratic	Jeff Smith	3,159	21.44%
Democratic	Bryan Weaver	3,155	21.41%
Write-in		39	0.50%
Total votes		14,734	100%

=== Republican primary ===
Candidates

- Marc Morgan

2010 Council of the District of Columbia Ward 1 Republican primary
Party	Candidate	Votes	%
Republican	Marc Morgan	126	76.36%
Write-in		39	23.64%
Total votes		165	100%

=== Statehood Green primary ===
No candidates filed for the primary, with Nancy Shia winning the nomination through write-in votes.

2010 Council of the District of Columbia Ward 1 Statehood Green primary
Party	Candidate	Votes	%
	Write-in	59	100%
Total votes		59	100%

=== General Election ===
2010 Council of the District of Columbia Ward 1 election
Party	Candidate	Votes	%
Democratic	Jim Graham	11,946	81.31%
DC Statehood Green	Nancy Shia	1,376	9.37%
Republican	Marc Morgan	1,137	7.74%
Write-in		233	1.59%
Total votes		14,692	100%

== Ward 3 ==
2010 District of Columbia Ward 3 Election
- November 2, 2010
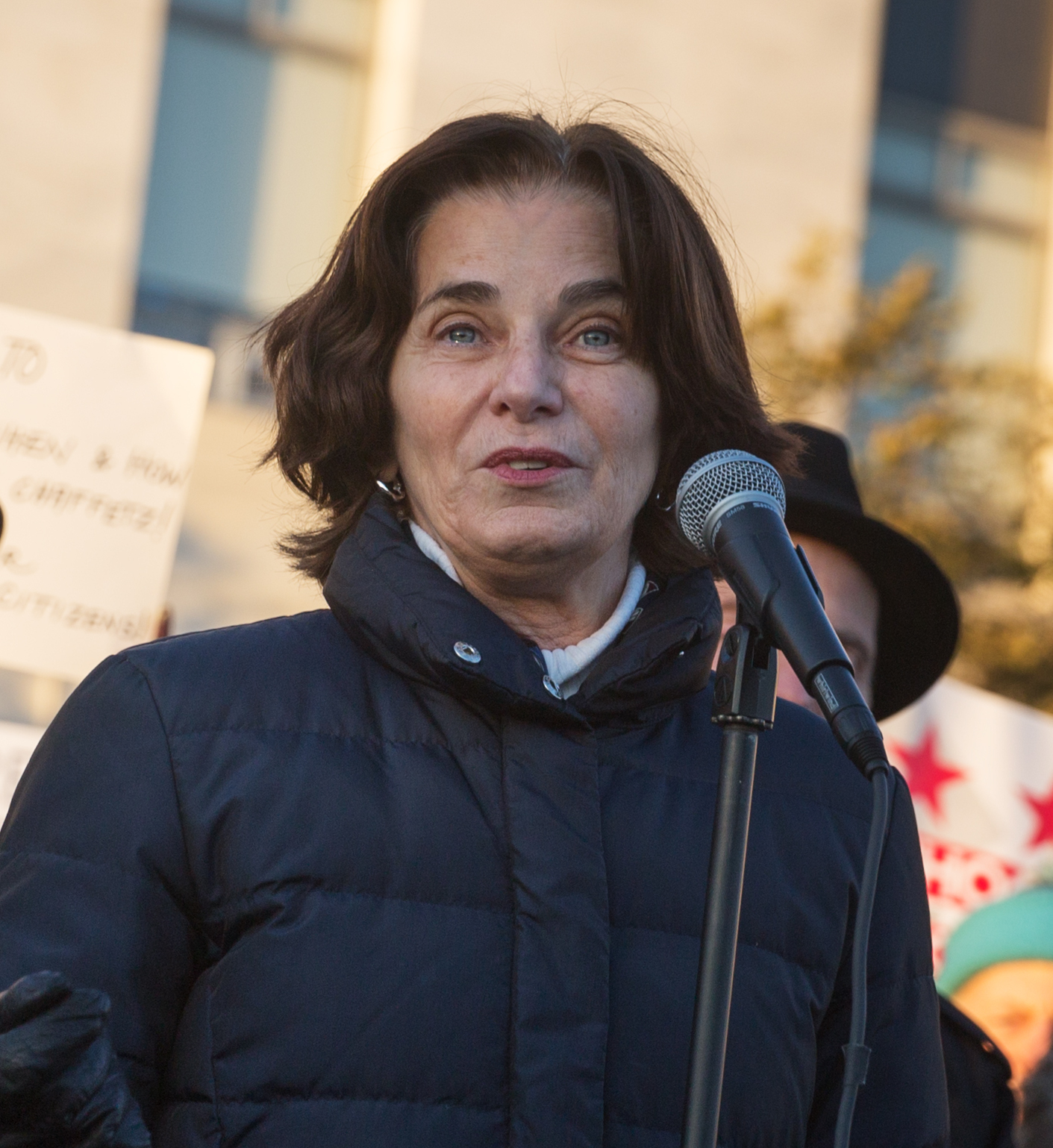

Nominee	Mary Cheh	Dave Hedgepeth
Party	Democratic	Republican
Popular vote	12,141	6,363
Percentage	64.95%	34.04%
Councilmember before election
Mary Cheh
Democratic
Elected Councilmember
Mary Cheh
Democratic

Incumbent councilmember Mary Cheh won re-election to a third term, defeating Republican nominee Dave Hedgepeth.

=== Democratic primary ===
Candidates

- Mary Cheh, incumbent Ward 3 Councilmember (since 2003)

Endorsements

Mary Cheh

Organizations

- Greater Greater Washington

2010 Council of the District of Columbia Ward 3 Democratic primary
Party	Candidate	Votes	%
Democratic	Mary Cheh (inc.)	14,090	93.68%
Write-in		950	6.32%
Total votes		15,040	100%

=== Republican primary ===
Candidates

- Dave Hedgepeth, litigation lawyer

2010 Council of the District of Columbia Ward 3 Republican primary
Party	Candidate	Votes	%
Republican	Dave Hedgepeth	600	92.88%
Write-in		46	7.12%
Total votes		646	100%

=== General Election ===
2010 Council of the District of Columbia Ward 3 election
Party	Candidate	Votes	%
Democratic	Mary Cheh (inc.)	12,141	64.95%
Republican	Dave Hedgepeth	6,363	34.04%
Write-in		190	1.02%
Total votes		18,694	100%

== Ward 5 ==
2010 District of Columbia Ward 5 Election
- November 2, 2010
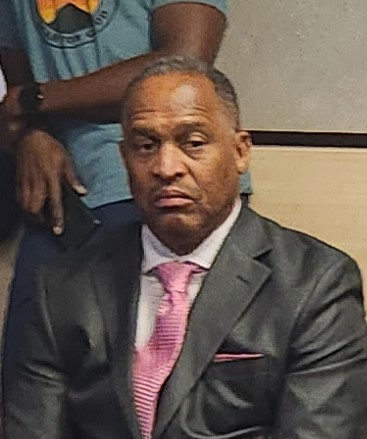

Nominee	Harry Thomas Jr.	Kathy Henderson	Tim Day
Party	Democratic	Independent	Republican
Popular vote	15,146	1,651	1,073
Percentage	83.85%	9.14%	5.94%
Councilmember before election
Vincent Orange
Democratic
Elected Councilmember
Harry Thomas Jr.
Democratic

Incumbent councilmember Vincent Orange declined to run for a second term to run for Mayor. The seat was won by Harry Thomas Jr., son of former Ward 5 Councilmember Harry Thomas Sr..

=== Democratic primary ===
Candidates

- Delano Hunter
- Kenyan McDuffie
- Harry Thomas Jr., son of former Ward 5 Councilmember Harry Thomas Sr.
- Tracey D. Turner

Endorsements

Delano Hunter

fendor

Publications

- The Washington Post
Kenyan McDuffie

Organizations

- Greater Greater Washington
Harry Thomas Jr.

Organizations

- Capital Stonewall Democrats

2010 Council of the District of Columbia Ward 5 Democratic primary
Party	Candidate	Votes	%
Democratic	Harry Thomas Jr.	11,185	61.67%
Democratic	Delano Hunter	3,471	19.14%
Democratic	Kenyan McDuffie	2,685	14.80%
Democratic	Tracey D. Turner	750	4.13%
Write-in		47	0.26%
Total votes		18,138	100%

=== Republican primary ===
Candidates

- Tim Day

2010 Council of the District of Columbia Ward 5 Republican primary
Party	Candidate	Votes	%
Republican	Tim Day	115	77.18%
Write-in		34	22.82%
Total votes		149	100%

=== Independents ===
Candidates

- Kathy Henderson

=== General Election ===
2010 Council of the District of Columbia Ward 5 election
Party	Candidate	Votes	%
Democratic	Harry Thomas Jr.	15,146	83.85%
Independent	Kathy Henderson	1,073	5.94%
Independent	Kathy Henderson	1,651	9.14%
Republican	Tim Day	1,073	5.94%
Write-in		194	1.07%
Total votes		20,977	100%

== Ward 6 ==
2010 District of Columbia Ward 6 Election
- November 2, 2010
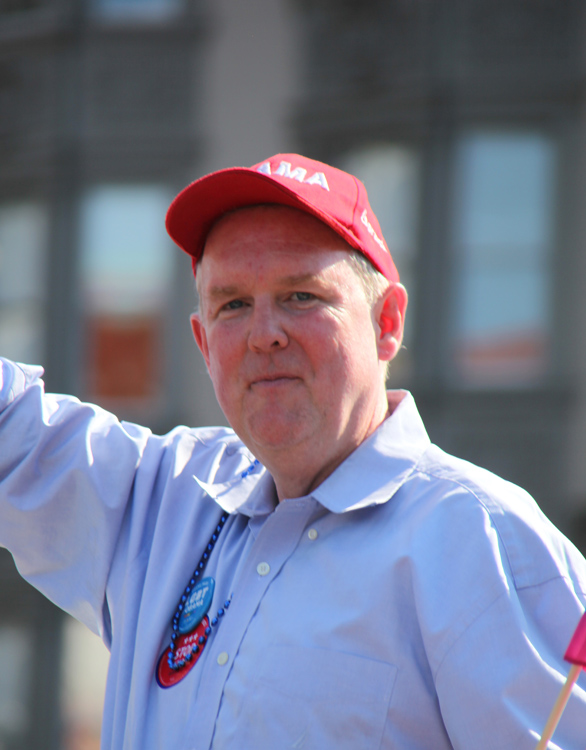

Nominee	Tommy Wells	Jim DeMartino
Party	Democratic	Republican
Popular vote	16,256	2,674
Percentage	85.18%	14.01%
Councilmember before election
Tommy Wells
Democratic
Elected Councilmember
Tommy Wells
Democratic

Incumbent councilmember Tommy Wells won re-election to a second term, defeating Republican nominee Jim DeMartino.

=== Democratic primary ===
Candidates

- Kelvin Robinson, former chief of staff to Mayor Anthony Williams
- Tommy Wells, incumbent Ward 6 Councilmember (since 2007)

Endorsements

Tommy Wells

Organizations

- Greater Greater Washington

Publications

- The Washington Post

Debates

Debates and forums for Ward 6 Democratic primary candidates
Date	Place	Host	Participants		
P Participant. I Invitee. A Absent. N Confirmed non-invitee. O Out of race (exploring, suspended, or not yet entered)			DeMartino (Note: Due to District of Columbia general elections being overwhelmingly dominated by the Democratic party, some notionally partisan forums invite candidates from other political parties to give them a chance to speak and engage with Democratic candidates.)	Robinson	Wells
1 September 2010	Christ Our Shepherd Church	Ward 6 Democrats	P	P	P

2010 Council of the District of Columbia Ward 6 Democratic primary
Party	Candidate	Votes	%
Democratic	Tommy Wells (inc.)	12,862	75.10%
Democratic	Kelvin Robinson	4,186	24.44%
Write-in		79	0.46%
Total votes		17,127	100%

=== Republican primary ===
Candidates

- Jim DeMartino, military consultant for the United States Navy

2010 Council of the District of Columbia Ward 6 Republican primary
Party	Candidate	Votes	%
Republican	Jim DeMartino	456	91.02%
Write-in		45	8.98%
Total votes		501	100%

=== General Election ===
2010 Council of the District of Columbia Ward 6 election
Party	Candidate	Votes	%
Democratic	Tommy Wells (inc.)	16,256	85.18%
Republican	Jim DeMartino	2,674	14.01%
Write-in		154	0.81%
Total votes		19,084	100%
