= GLAA =

GLAA may refer to:

- Gay and Lesbian Activists Alliance, a not-for-profit organization based in Washington, D.C., United States
- Greater Los Angeles Area, a term for the urbanized area around the county of Los Angeles, California, United States
- Great Lakes Adventist Academy, a Seventh-day Adventist boarding school in Cedar Lake, Michigan, United States
- Gangmasters and Labour Abuse Authority, a non-departmental public body in the United Kingdom
