= Hill Rag =

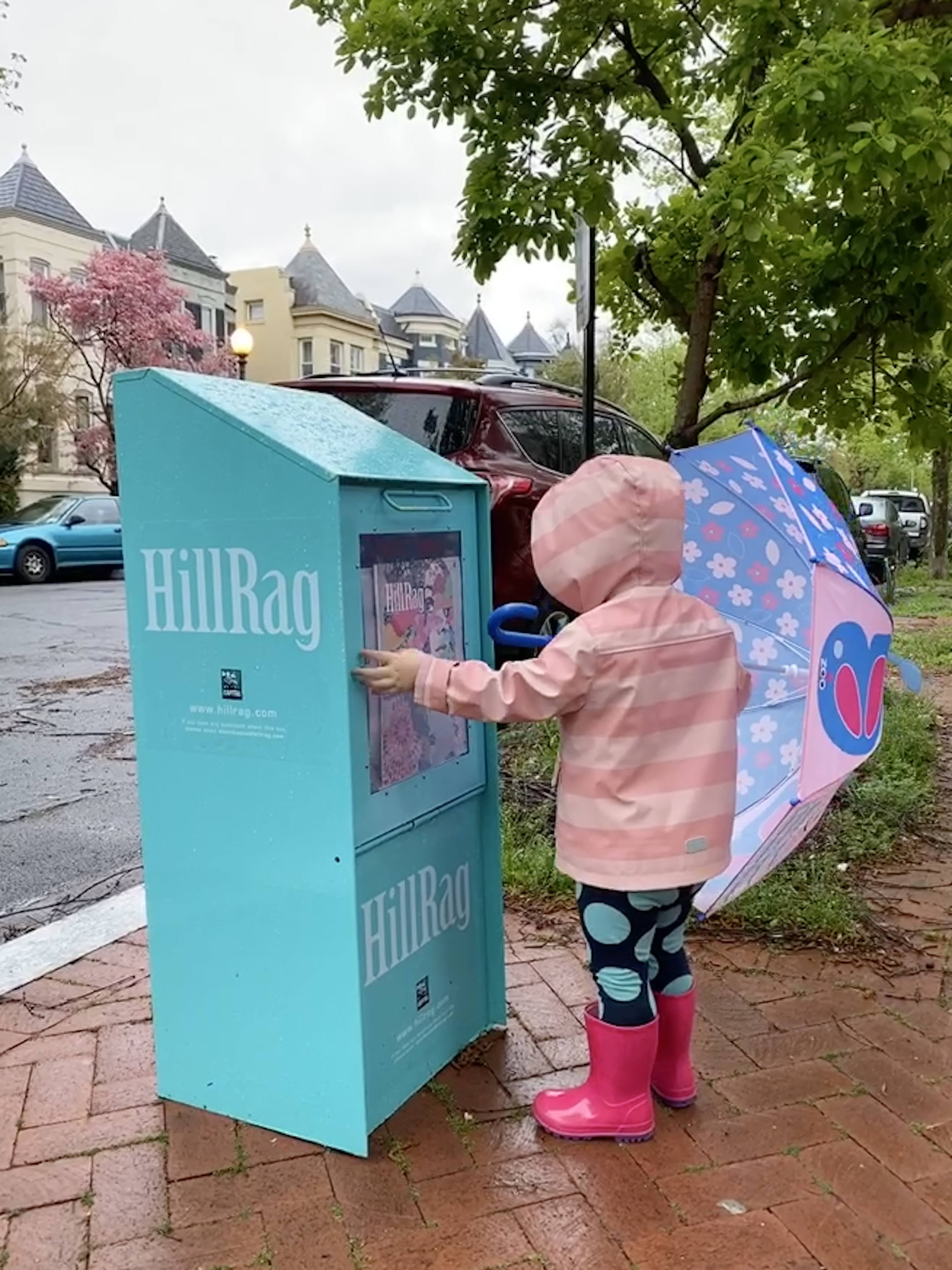
- A child opens a Hill Rag newsstand during a rainy day on Capitol Hill, Washington, D.C. in 2020.
- Type: Monthly newspaper
- Format: Tabloid
- Owner(s): Capital Community News, Inc.
- Publisher: Jean-Keith Fagon
- Editor: Melissa Ashabranner
- Headquarters: 224 7th St., SE, Suite 300; Washington, D.C. 20003; United States
- OCLC number: 39308468

The Hill Rag is a community newspaper based in Washington, D.C.'s Capitol Hill neighborhood. Founded in October 1976, it is published monthly in print and daily online. One of the few community newspapers still in print in DC, the Hill Rag will celebrate its 50th anniversary in 2026.

In addition to Capitol Hill, it provides coverage of the Southwest Waterfront, The Wharf, H Street Northeast, Navy Yard and NoMa neighborhoods. The Hill Rag is owned by Capital Community News Inc., one of the largest publishing firms of community-based publications in the United States, which also owns several other DC newspapers and publications.

It should not be confused with The Hill, a weekly newspaper covering the United States Congress.

== History ==
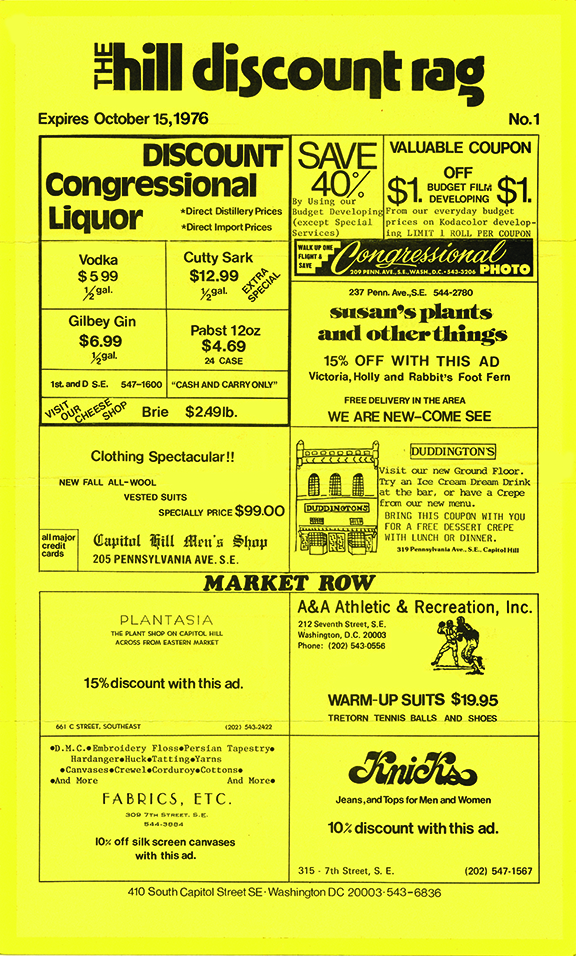
Page 1 of the first Hill "Discount" Rag, with deals expiring Oct. 15, 1976. The ad flier would grow to become the hyperlocal paper serving the Capitol Hill Neighborhood of Washington, D.C. Congressional Liquor is still in operation.

The Hill Rag was founded in 1976, when Jean-Keith Fagon realized that neighborhood businesses were looking for a way to reach the customers who could walk to their establishments.

Equipped with an idea, he sought business card-sized ads from shops and services along the Pennsylvania Avenue SE corridor and nearby Barracks Row.

The result was the first "Hill Discount Rag," a two-page flier printed on yellow paper with deals expiring Oct. 16, 1976. 7,000 yellow fliers were printed and distributed throughout the neighborhood by neighborhood children.

The paper quickly grew. By late the next year, church groups began asking if they could put notices in the flier. Soon, Fagon hired freelance writer Dianne Wacks to add a few short articles about services and shops within the paper's distribution area. Sometime in 1977, the word "Discount" was dropped from the title. Additional writers joined the staff in 1978, including Celeste McCall, who as of 2025 still writes the paper's dining column, called "Capitol Cuisine."

By 1981, the paper regularly reached 28 pages. Long-term business manager Tawny Harding decided to step away and Melissa Ashabranner stepped in to fill the breach, with Fagon becoming publisher. Ashabranner, who has an MBA from Yale University, streamlined the business side of the operation. By 1982, the paper was up to 82 pages monthly; in 2013, it reached 160 pages a month.

== Weekly Experiment and Newsstand Distribution ==
In the 1980s, concerned about the emergence of the weekly Washington City Paper, the Hill Rag experimented with weekly distribution. (The Washington City Paper ceased publishing in print in 2022.) The pressures of printing and distribution costs, combined with the limited pool of advertisers in a small geographic area meant that frequency couldn’t last, according to Ashabranner:

"We had many difficult years just from that one decision, trying to keep things going. We backed out of the weekly and went to a bi-weekly format. And we were bi-weekly until about 1993, and then we went back to monthly."

In 1999, the Hill Rag faced hyperlocal competition from another Capitol Hill focused monthly, The Voice of the Hill. Shortly after, the Hill Rag went to a newsstand model, abandoning home delivery. The Voice of the Hill shuttered in 2010.

Today, the distinctive turquoise-colored Hill Rag newsstands can be found all over the Capitol Hill neighborhoods, from Florida Avenue to the Anacostia River and from the U.S. Capitol Building to R.F.K. Stadium Campus.

In 1995, Capital Community News took over publication of the Capitol Hill Guide from the Capitol Hill Restoration Society (CHRS), which had created the book as a fundraiser for their nonprofit. The publisher renamed it the Fagon Guide to Capitol Hill. It is published annually and distributed free of charge to doorsteps in the 20002, 20003 and 20024 zip codes—roughly equivalent to the Hill Rag distribution area.

== A Place to Start In Journalism ==
After the appearance of The Voice, the Hill Rag focused more intently on professionalizing the newsroom, dedicating more money to editorial writing. Ashabranner took on the role of Executive Editor, handing Managing Editor duties to Andrew Lightman in 2004, who first started with the company in 1992. Lightman moved to ensure the newsroom more closely adhered to the ethics and standards of journalism.

Many well-known journalists and those who have gone on to make their name in District journalism have written for the Hill Rag and related publications. Notable names include Charnice A. Milton who was tragically killed in the performance of her duties in 2015; Elissa Silverman, who later covered DC politics as the "Loose Lips" reporter at Washington City Paper and went on to become an at-large DC Councilmember; Cunyet Dil, later with Axios; Mark Segraves, now with NBC Washington; science journalist and author Sadie Dingfelder and Martin Austermuhle, who went on to DCist, WAMU, and later, local employee-owned newssite, The 51st.

Today, the Hill Rag employs a full-time staff of about one dozen employees, including editorial, graphics and advertising personnel. In addition they employ many columnists, distribution staff and freelance writers.

The paper provides extensive coverage of news at the hyperlocal level, with particular attention to the activities of DC Council as it affects readers, meetings of Advisory Neighborhood Commissions (ANCs), public meetings hosted by District agencies, large development projects, public schools, as well as profiles of neighborhood personalities and groups.

== Expansion ==
In 2001, Fagon and Ashabranner created publishing company Capital Community News to launch two other monthly print publications in addition to the Hill Rag, which remains the flagship publication.

East of the River DC covers Wards 7 and 8 in the District; and MidCity DC News covers the central Northeast and Northwest neighborhoods, including Bloomingdale, Shaw, Mount Vernon and Dupont Circle.

All three titles publish stories daily online at their respective websites.

== Recognition ==
The paper has been recognized by legislation passed by the Council of the District of Columbia twice: in 1993, with a resolution honoring community service, at the request of then-Mayor Sharon Pratt; and in January 2017, another resolution introduced by Ward 6 Councilmember Charles Allen honored the publication's 40th anniversary.
