= William R. Spaulding =

American politician (1924–2021)

William Spaulding

Member of the Council of the District of Columbia from Ward 5
- In office January 2, 1975 – January 2, 1987
- Preceded by: Position established
- Succeeded by: Harry Thomas Sr.

Personal details
- Born: William Ridley Spaulding; June 15, 1924 Hallsboro, North Carolina, U.S.
- Died: November 1, 2021 (aged 97)
- Party: Democratic
- Education: Howard University (BS)

William Ridley Spaulding (June 15, 1924 – November 1, 2021) was an American politician during the 1970s and 1980s who, running as a Democrat, was elected one of the original members of the Council of the District of Columbia in the aftermath of Washington, D.C. gaining home rule in 1973.

A native of North Carolina, William Spaulding attended Howard University, a private, historically black educational institution in Washington, DC, from which he graduated in 1947 with a B.S. in mechanical engineering. He worked as a teacher in D.C. public schools from 1947 to 1952 and was on the faculty of his alma mater, Howard, from 1950 to 1960, while also serving as an engineer at the National Security Agency from 1952 to 1974. In 1955, while teaching at Howard, he married Dolores Hinton, a music education major at the university, and they became the parents of three daughters, Deirdre, Michele and Angelyn.

Following the congressional passage of District of Columbia home rule, he left his position with the NSA and campaigned for a seat on the D.C. Council, taking office in 1975. In 1978, while serving on the council, he embarked upon additional duties as producer of the area's best-known local talent show, Metro Talent Search and, in 1980, accepted the position of instructor at University of the District of Columbia, another historically black institution of higher learning. He has also served as chair of the Fort Lincoln Foundation and board member of the Kidney Foundation and the American Heart Association. Having represented Ward 5 on the council from 1975 to 1987, he was defeated by Harry Thomas Sr. in the 1986 Democratic primary, but continued his government career in the position of director of Department of Administrative Services for the District of Columbia Court System. In February 2005, on the occasion of their fiftieth wedding anniversary, William Spaulding and Dolores Hinton Spaulding were honored by the D.C. Council for their many years of public service.

Spaulding died on November 1, 2021, at the age of 97.
