= Harry Thomas Sr. =

American politician (1922–1999)

Harry Thomas

Member of the Council of the District of Columbia from Ward 5
- In office January 2, 1987 – January 2, 1999
- Preceded by: William Spaulding
- Succeeded by: Vincent Orange

Personal details
- Born: February 3, 1922
- Died: August 7, 1999 (aged 77) Washington, D.C., U.S.
- Party: Democratic
- Children: Harry

Harry Thomas Sr. (February 3, 1922 – August 7, 1999) was a Democratic politician in Washington, D.C. He was elected to represent Ward 5 on the Council of the District of Columbia in 1986 and served three full terms until his defeat in the 1998 Democratic primary to Vincent Orange.

== Early life and education ==
Thomas grew up in Richmond, Virginia, and dropped out of high school before enlisting in the army during World War II. After the war he moved to Washington, D.C., where he held a series of federal government jobs beginning with janitor and ending in the Department of the Interior's Office of Public Affairs. He worked a second full-time job as headwaiter at Bolling Air Force Base so that his children would be able to attend college.

== Career ==
In 1986, after retiring from Interior, Thomas challenged incumbent William Spaulding for the Ward 5 council seat in the Democratic primary and won. During his tenure in office he was known as a ward boss more focused on providing constituent services than sponsoring legislation. He received attention for sponsoring controversial ceremonial resolutions honoring Louis Farrakhan and Abdul Alim Muhammad, two leaders of the Nation of Islam.

In 1998, Thomas ran for re-election, challenged by Vincent Orange, who had run against him in 1994, and three others. The Washington Post's editorial board endorsed Orange's candidacy. Orange emphasized improvements to New York Avenue, improving the economy and schools, and restricting liquor licenses. Orange defeated Thomas, receiving 38 percent of the vote to Thomas' 34 percent. The Washington Post described it as an upset victory. Orange won the general election as well with 89 percent of the vote.

== Family and legacy ==
Thomas's son, Harry Thomas Jr., was elected to the Ward 5 council seat in 2006 and served until resigning in 2012 after pleading guilty to felony charges of embezzlement.
