= Gay and Lesbian Activists Alliance =

Gay and Lesbian Activists Alliance (GLAA)
- Founded: April 20, 1971; 55 years ago
- Founders: Paul Kuntzler; Joel Martin; Frank Kameny; Rick Rosendall
- Type: Gay rights activist group
- Purpose: Advance rights of gay men and lesbians in D.C.
- Location: Washington, D.C., U.S.
- Region served: Washington, D.C.
- Members: 150
- Key people: Richard J. Rosendall, President; Charles Butler, Vice President for Political Affairs; Kevin Davis, Vice President for Administration; Saul Cruz, Secretary; Gary Collins, Treasurer
- Employees: 0
- Website: www.glaa.org

The Gay and Lesbian Activists Alliance (GLAA) of Washington, D.C. is a United States not-for-profit organization that works to secure legal rights for gays and lesbians in the District of Columbia.

GLAA is a non-partisan advocacy organization founded April 20, 1971 as the Gay Activist Alliance of Washington. It is the United States' oldest continuously-active organization devoted to lesbian, gay, bisexual, and transgender (LGBTQ) civil rights. The Alliance is a volunteer organization and has no paid staff.

== History ==
The group was founded on April 20, 1971, evolving from Frank Kameny's Congressional campaign. In 1970, Congress allowed the District of Columbia to elect a non-voting representative to the House of Representatives. A group of gay activists in the District of Columbia thought that none of the candidates showed enough attention to gay issues, so with help from the Gay Activists Alliance from New York City, volunteers collected over 7,000 signatures to add Kameny as a candidate. Though Kameny was not elected, his supporters turned the political campaign into what was then called the Gay Activists Alliance. Paul Kuntzler and Joel Martin, both gay rights activists, played large roles in the creation of the Alliance, modeling it after New York's Gay Activists Alliance. Rick Rosendall, the Vice President for Political Affairs, contacted Kameny and joined in the late 1970s.

In 1986, under the group's first woman president Lorri Jean, the Gay Activists Alliance changed its name to the Gay and Lesbian Activists Alliance.

== Activities ==
The Alliance has led or been leaders in legislative efforts in the District of Columbia—including passing the Human Rights Act, repealing the sodomy law, passing the Bias Crimes Related Act (hate crimes act), passing and expanding domestic partnerships., and passing marriage equality. As Ian Lekus puts it, the organization worked to challenge the assumed meaning of community towards one that was an action rather than a group.

The group also functions as a political watchdog to make sure that the District's police department and other agencies work with and not against the LGBT community. The group is also involved with lobbying and conducting research.

The group has worked at the federal level regarding family medical care, the definition of "family", family leave, and child custody. In 2000, Superintendent Arlene Ackerman instituted an anti-harassment policy at all District of Columbia public schools.

Many members of the group work extensively to cope with the AIDS pandemic. In 1998, they lobbied to implement a unique system to identify cases of HIV/AIDS while maintaining the privacy of the patients. Another of the Alliance's efforts is to direct more attention towards the needs of women with HIV/AIDS. The Alliance calls for city agencies that dispense contraceptives and barriers for disease protection to also dispense dental dams and other forms of protection for safe lesbian sex. The Alliance website was recognized as one of two out of 23 "homosexual" sites chosen for analysis that included lesbian issues in a health concerns section.

The Alliance collaborates extensively with many organizations, including the Gertrude Stein Democratic Club, Coalition of Black Lesbians and Gay Men, ENLACE (a gay Latino activism group), Log Cabin Republicans, Gays and Lesbians Opposing Violence, and the Sexual Minority Youth Assistance League.

The Alliance participates in politics by rating political candidates based on their views on gay and lesbian issues. However, the Alliance is opposed to taking stances on other political issues, such as war. Rick Rosendall said, "I think gay rights organizations should focus on gay rights... There are already enough groups that oppose war. If they [gay rights groups] want to do that, they shouldn't pretend to be a gay rights group."

== Gay and Lesbian Education Fund ==
In 1982, the Alliance established the nonprofit Gay and Lesbian Education Fund. Though related to the Alliance, it has its own board of directors. Its goal is to educate the heterosexual community about gay and lesbian issues. It both raises money and provides grants for this purpose. For example, in 1991 it ran a significant advertising campaign to place signs reading "Everytime You Think 'Dyke' or 'Faggot' Remember, We Belong to Someone's Family. Perhaps Yours." on buses throughout the District of Columbia.

== See also ==
- LGBT rights in the United States
- List of LGBT rights organizations
