= Carver Langston =

Two neighborhoods in Washington, D.C., US

- Neighborhood of Washington, D.C.
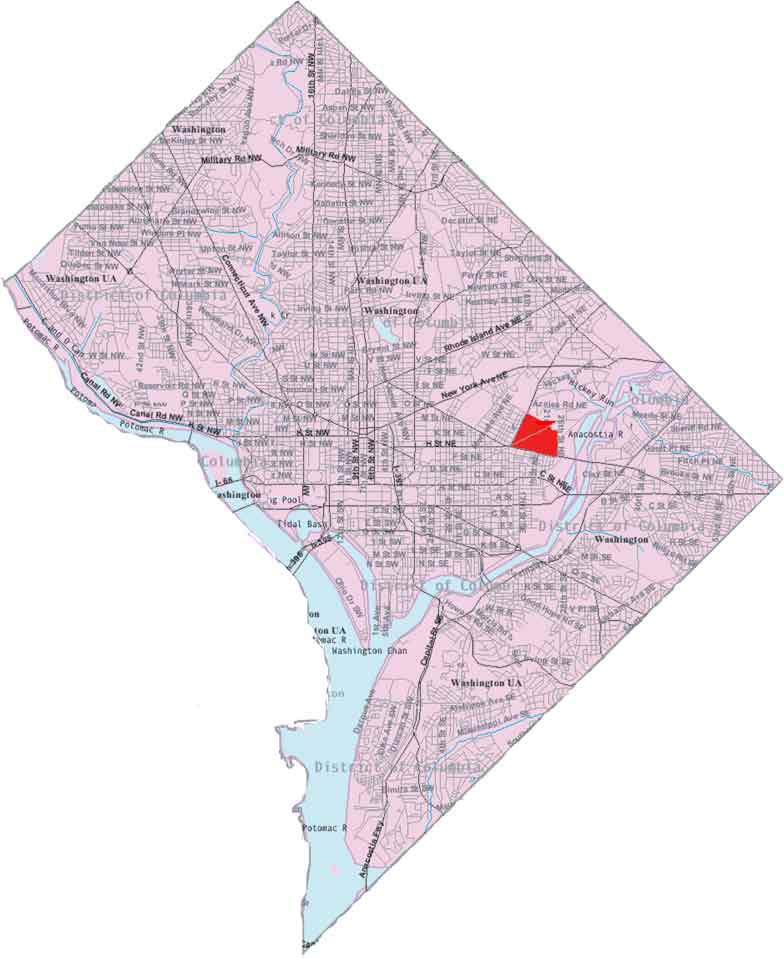
- Carver Langston within the District of Columbia
- Coordinates: 38.9009°N 76.9773°W
- Country: United States
- District: Washington, D.C.
- Ward: Ward 5

Government
  - Councilmember: Zachary Parker
- Postal code: ZIP code

Carver Langston is a cluster of two neighborhoods, Carver and Langston, just south of the United States National Arboretum in Northeast Washington, D.C. The two neighborhoods are most often referred to as one, because they are two small triangular neighborhoods that together form a square of land on the western bank of the Anacostia River.

Carver is the smaller and northernmost neighborhood of the two, bordered by Bladensburg Road to the west, M Street NE to the north, and Maryland Avenue to the southeast. Langston is bordered by Maryland Avenue to the northwest, 22nd and 26th Streets NE to the east, and Benning Road to the south. Directly east of the neighborhood on the very edge of the river is the Langston Golf Course, listed on the National Register of Historic Places as the first course in the United States to allow blacks; boxing champion Joe Louis was one of its most frequent visitors.

Carver is named after George Washington Carver, a famous black inventor. Langston Terrace is named after John Mercer Langston who served as the first black American from Virginia to serve in the United States Congress. Langston Terrace is famous because it is the city's first federally funded public housing program to be built in 1938. The housing projects were explicitly designed for African American residents, since the District was rigidly segregated at the time.

Carver Langston is a middle-income residential neighborhood populated by retirees, families, young professionals and renters. Although now it is starting to gentrify particularly on its western and southern edges.

The area's main retail center is Hechinger Mall, with its namesake having been closed since the late 1990s. The entire area is part of Ward 5.

== Gallery ==
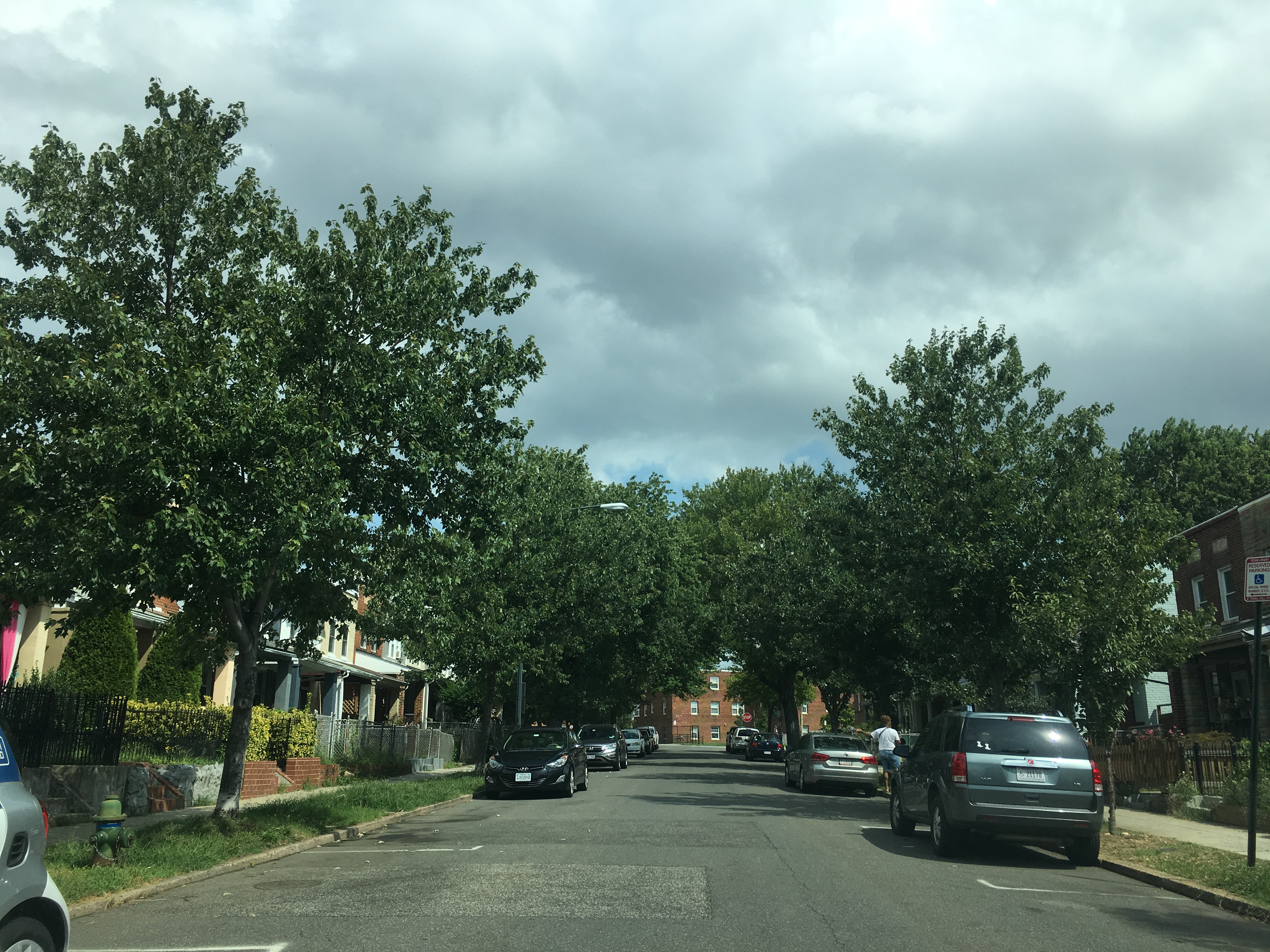
Carver, intersection of 18th St and L St NE, September 2018

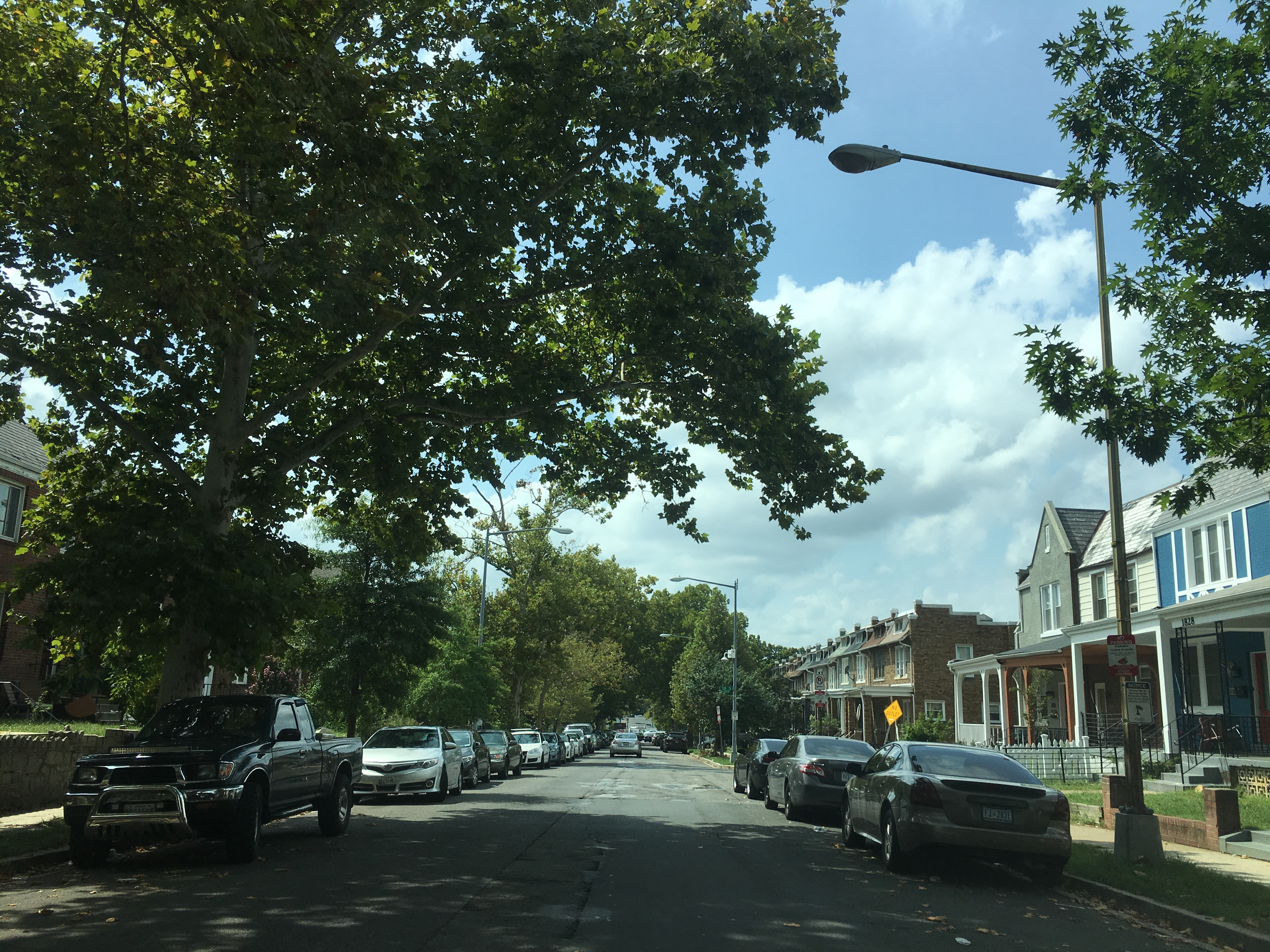
Carver, intersection of 19th St and M St NE, September 2018

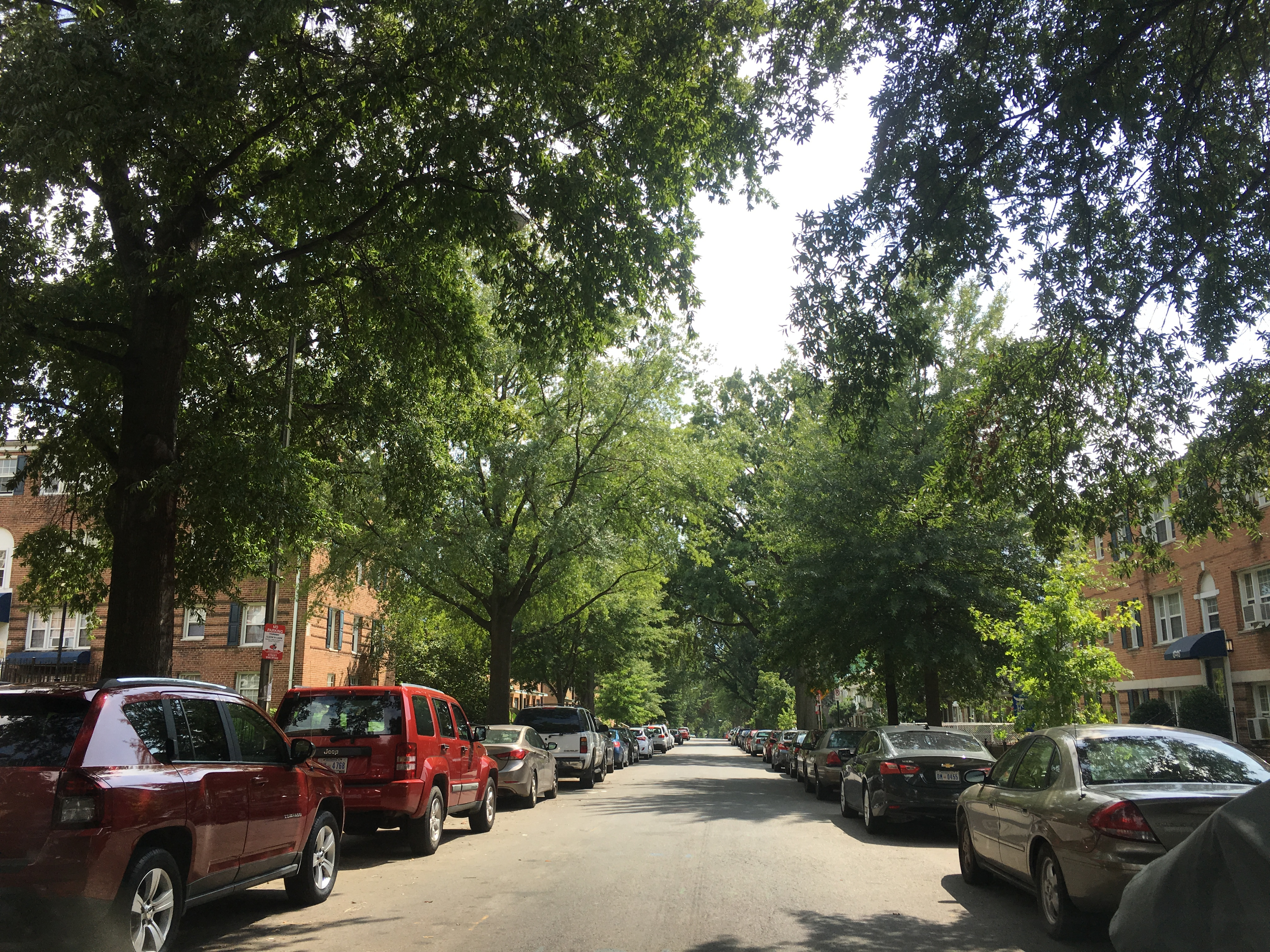
Langston, intersection of 21 St and I St NE, September 2018
