= Charles Allen (Washington, D.C., politician) =

American politician from Washington, D.C.

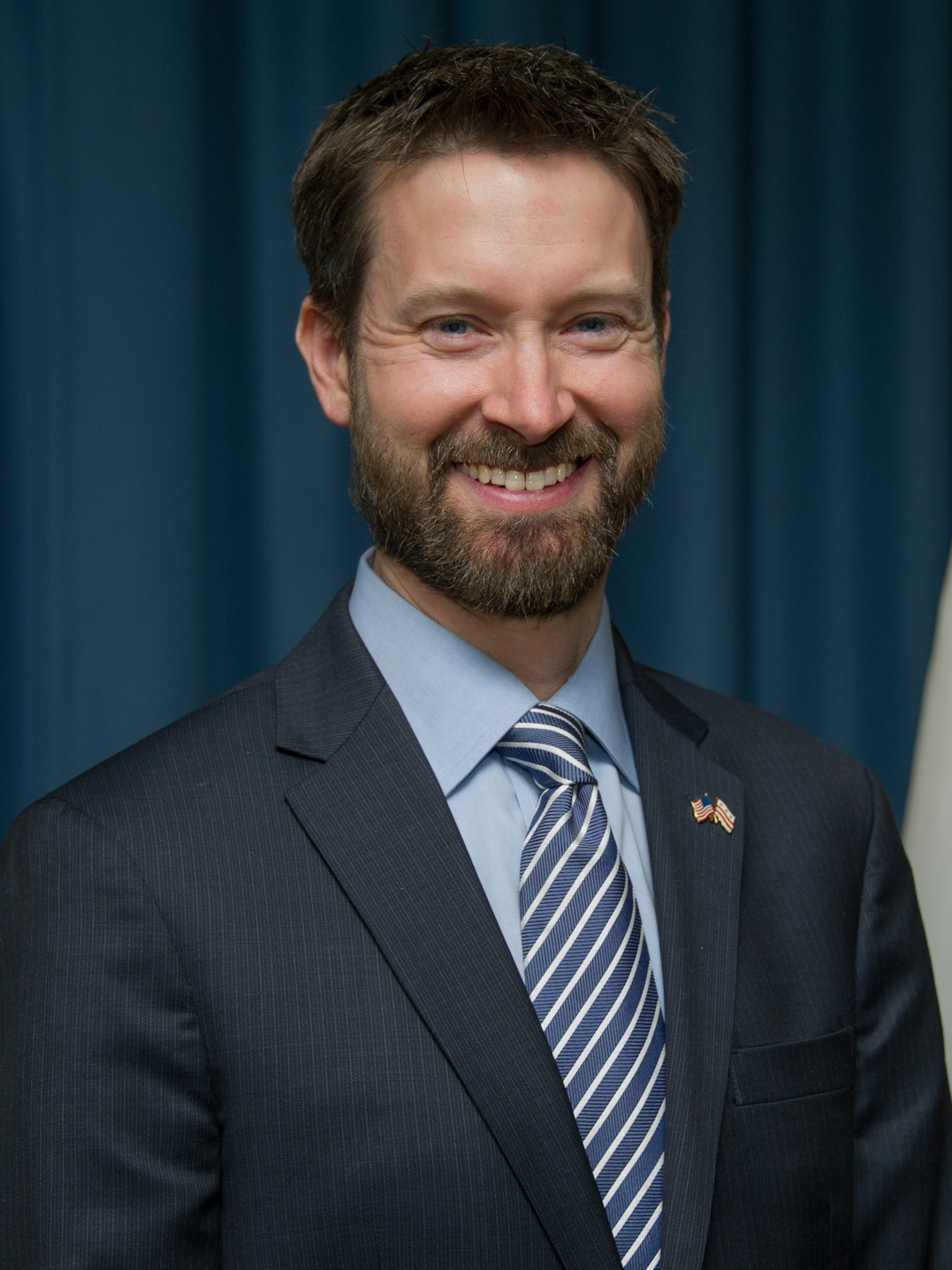
- Official portrait, 2017

Member of the Council of the District of Columbia from Ward 6
- Incumbent
- Assumed office January 2, 2015
- Preceded by: Tommy Wells

Personal details
- Born: 1977 (age 48–49) Birmingham, Alabama, U.S.
- Party: Democratic
- Education: Washington and Lee University (BA); University of Alabama, Birmingham (MPH)

Charles Allen (born 1977) is an American politician. A member of the Democratic Party, Allen has served on the Council of the District of Columbia for Ward 6 since January 2, 2015. Allen initially won office in the 2014 general election, and was re-elected in 2018 and again in 2022.

== Early life and education ==
Charles Allen grew up in the Birmingham, Alabama, suburb of Homewood and graduated from Homewood High School.

Allen graduated from Washington and Lee University. The summer after his sophomore year, he interned at a free clinic in South Boston. He holds a Master of Public Health from the University of Alabama at Birmingham.

== Personal life ==
Allen is married to Jordi Hutchinson. The couple has a daughter and a son.

== Early political career ==
Allen was hired as director of public policy for the District of Columbia Primary Care Association in 2003. The following year, Allen served as the Ward 6 coordinator for Howard Dean's presidential campaign. He was a delegate for Dean at the 2004 Democratic National Convention. As chairman of the grass roots Democratic organization D.C. for Democracy, Allen sent hundreds of District residents to other states to campaign.

Allen resigned from the District of Columbia Primary Care Association to manage Tommy Wells' campaign for the Ward 6 seat on the Council of the District of Columbia in 2006. After Wells won the election, Wells hired Allen as his chief of staff.

Allen was president of the Ward 6 Democrats from 2009 to 2013. While president, the group voted to urge the Council of the District of Columbia to pass a law legalizing same-sex marriage.

In 2012, the D.C. Democratic State Committee chose the person to replace Phil Mendelson as at-large council member for 70 days before a special election was held. Allen was opposed to the process, saying that only the voters should choose the replacement for an at-large vacancy, not a small group of party committee members.

== Member of the Council of the District of Columbia (2015–present) ==
=== Relationship with D.C. police force and union ===
Despite endorsements from DC's police force and union early in his political career, Allen has been criticized more recently by DC's Police Union for advancing legislation making it easier to fire officers who violate the law and codifying many of MPD’s General Orders into law, such as banning the use of neck restraints. In an advertisement released in April 2022, the Police Union points to Allen and Phil Mendelson for the results of crime bills that do not support law enforcement.

The source of the union’s complaints is a change in law removing the disciplinary process for officer misconduct from collective bargaining agreement negotiations between the union and management, making it far easier for the Chief of the Metropolitan Police Department to fire officers found guilty of offenses as serious as sexual assault of a teenager within a department cruiser and showing up drunk off-duty in a department cruiser to a traffic stop for the officer’s fiancé. The Washington Post reported in 2017 that hundreds of officers who were fired from the nation’s largest police departments for misconduct were hired back, largely due to provisions within collective bargaining agreements.

Subsequently, the Union made an urgent plea to Mayor Bowser, noting that two years of reform under the Council have done nothing to increase safety, but rather Allen and Mendelson's reforms have resulted in more deaths, "The experiment is a failure, and people are dying."[36] Since that interview however, crime has dropped precipitously two years in a row.

During his time as Chair of the Council’s Committee on the Judiciary and Public Safety, Allen took a number of steps both the Metropolitan Police Department and the union supported, including growing the department’s cadet program from 25 slots to 150 to create a pipeline of new recruits to hire and included in DC’s 2021 budget a $20,000 hiring bonus for new hires, the largest in the region at the time. He has voted to approve every collective bargaining agreement that has come before the Council and put in place resources to direct non-emergency deployments by sworn officers that could be handled by a civilian.

On December 30, 2022, the police union released the following statistics of increases in crime since the reforms were enacted: "Armed robberies increased by 36%; Carjackings increased by 177%. Also noteworthy, the annual homicide rate was less than 90 in 2012; 104 and 105 in 2013 and 2014 respectively. "Some neighborhoods are suffering greatly from this violence," the D.C. Police Union said. "In Ward 2, for example, homicides have increased 440% when looking at the last three years against the previous three." A broader view shows MPD crime statistics during Allen’s six year tenure as Chair on the Judiciary Committee show decreases in nearly every category of violent and property crime compared to the prior six years.

Violent crime rates in the District of Columbia have fallen almost 30% since 2023, including a 20-year-low in 2024 and again in 2025, despite those same laws remaining in effect.

=== Self-driving cars ===
Allen has repeatedly advocated in favor of Waymo's expansion to Washington, D.C. In April 2026, he introduced a bill to permit robotaxi operations.

=== Committee membership ===
As of October 2025, Allen currently serves on the following committees:

- Committee on Transportation and the Environment (chairperson)
- Committee of the Whole
- Committee on Business and Economic Development
- Committee on Health
- Committee on Judiciary and Public Safety

== Electoral history ==
=== 2014 election ===
Allen was the chief of staff of Ward 6 Council Member Tommy Wells. After Wells decided not to run for reelection in order to run for mayor, Allen resigned from his position and announced his candidacy to succeed Wells seat in the Council representing Ward 6. Darrel Thompson, a former deputy chief of staff of Senate Majority Leader Harry Reid, also ran in the Democratic primary. Pranav Badhwar ran in the Libertarian primary.

When campaigning, Allen emphasized his work helping Ward 6 working for Wells, saying that gave him extensive knowledge and experience about Ward 6. Allen opposed the Large Retailer Accountability Act, which would have increased the minimum wage for large businesses located in the District, preferring instead an across-the-board minimum wage increase as opposed to a bill that only targeted large retailers. Allen also did not access donations to his campaign from corporations. Allen also criticized Thompson, saying Thompson's work has kept him focused on Nevada rather than the District, using the fact that Thompson has not voted in several District elections to make his case. Thompson responded saying that he knew the District well because he was born in the District, unlike Allen.

Thompson called Allen the "anointed candidate", a reference to Wells' choosing his own successor and labeling Allen as a political insider. Thompson also says that Allen is effectively asking for more time to carry out Wells' agenda that should have been completed during Wells' eight years on the council.

Allen was endorsed by the editorial board of The Washington Post, Service Employees International Union, D.C. for Democracy, D.C. Chamber of Commerce PAC, the D.C. Chapter of the National Organization for Women, the D.C. Association of Realtors, Clean Slate Now, the local firefighters' union, and the local police officers' union. The local American Federation of State, County and Municipal Employees endorsed Thompson.

Allen and his treasurer Patrick Johnson opted for a campaign finance model that did not accept corporate donations. This was consistent with Allen's championing of campaign finance reform, having been a supporter of DC's Initiative 70 in 2012. In the Democratic primary election, Allen defeated Thompson, with 58 percent of the vote. Allen faced Libertarian Party candidate Pranav Badhwar in the general election. Allen won the general election with 88 percent of the vote. His term began January 2, 2015.

Democratic primary

2014 Council of the District of Columbia Ward 6 Democratic primary
| Party | Candidate | Votes | % |
|---|---|---|---|
| Democratic | Charles Allen | 8,851 | 58.16% |
| Democratic | Darrel Thompson | 6,329 | 41.59% |
| Write-in | | 38 | 0.25% |
| Total votes | | 15,218 | 100% |

General election

2014 Council of the District of Columbia Ward 6 election
| Party | Candidate | Votes | % |
|---|---|---|---|
| Democratic | Charles Allen | 23,668 | 87.56% |
| Libertarian | Pranav Bahdwar | 3,127 | 11.57% |
| Write-in | | 237 | 0.88% |
| Total votes | | 27,032 | 100% |

=== 2018 election ===
During the 2018 Democratic primary election, Allen faced a primary challenger in Lisa Hunter, who worked in the Peace Corps and on the Barack Obama 2008 presidential campaign. Allen won in the primary with a wide majority of the vote.

In the general election on November 8, Allen defeated Republican Michael Bekesha with over 80% of the vote.

Democratic primary

2018 Council of the District of Columbia Ward 6 Democratic primary
| Party | Candidate | Votes | % |
|---|---|---|---|
| Democratic | Charles Allen (inc.) | 9,802 | 67.98% |
| Democratic | Lisa Hunter | 4,569 | 31.69% |
| Write-in | | 47 | 0.33% |
| Total votes | | 14,418 | 100.0% |

General election

2018 Council of the District of Columbia Ward 6 election
| Party | Candidate | Votes | % |
|---|---|---|---|
| Democratic | Charles Allen (inc.) | 35,780 | 88.30% |
| Republican | Michael Bekesha | 4,298 | 10.61% |
| Write-in | | 442 | 1.09% |
| Total votes | | 40,520 | 100.0% |

=== 2022 election ===
Allen was unopposed in both the primary and general elections, winning about 95% of the vote in both contests against write-ins.

Democratic primary

2022 Council of the District of Columbia Ward 6 Democratic primary
| Party | Candidate | Votes | % |
|---|---|---|---|
| Democratic | Charles Allen (inc.) | 14,541 | 96.34 |
| Democratic | Write-in | 553 | 3.66 |
| Total votes | | 15,094 | 100.00 |

General election

2022 Council of the District of Columbia Ward 6 election
| Party | Candidate | Votes | % |
|---|---|---|---|
| Democratic | Charles Allen (inc.) | 25,596 | 94.0 |
| Write-in | | 1,635 | 6.0 |
| Total valid votes | | 27,231 | 100.00 |
| Democratic hold | | | |

=== 2024 recall campaign ===
On February 13, 2024, the D.C. Board of Elections approved a recall campaign that, if successful, would remove Allen from office. If, within 180 days, the recall campaign collected signatures from ten percent of registered voters residing in Ward 6, a recall election would have been held.

On August 12, the recall effort failed to qualify as it only gathered 5,500 signatures, 900 fewer than the required minimum to put a recall on the ballot.

=== 2026 election ===
Allen defeated primary challengers Gloria Ann Nauden, an economic development consultant, and Michael Murphy, a lawyer.

Democratic primary

2026 Council of the District of Columbia Ward 6 Democratic primary
| Party | Candidate | Votes | % |
|---|---|---|---|
| Democratic | Charles Allen (inc.) | 14,787 | 75.74 |
| Democratic | Gloria Ann Nauden | 3,487 | 17.86 |
| Democratic | Michael Murphy | 1,178 | 6.03 |
| Write-in | | 71 | 0.36 |
| Total votes | | 19,150 | 100.00 |
