= Harry Thomas Jr. =

American politician (born 1960)

Harry Thomas
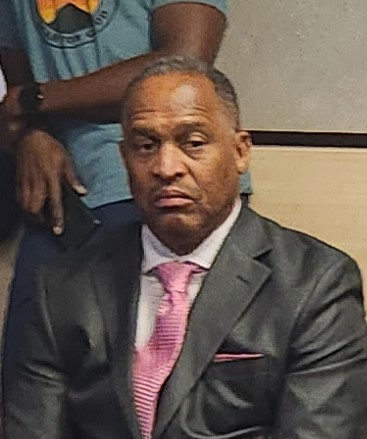
- Thomas in 2023

Member of the Council of the District of Columbia from Ward 5
- In office January 2, 2007 – January 5, 2012
- Preceded by: Vincent Orange
- Succeeded by: Kenyan McDuffie

Personal details
- Born: October 21, 1960 (age 65)
- Party: Democratic
- Relatives: Harry Thomas Sr. (father)
- Education: Bowie State University (BA)

Harry Thomas Jr. (born October 21, 1960) is an American politician. He is a Democratic politician in Washington, D.C. In 2006 he was elected to represent Ward 5 on the Council of the District of Columbia and served until his resignation in 2012, several hours after federal prosecutors filed charges of embezzlement and filing false tax returns against him.

== Biography ==
Thomas is the son of late three-term Ward 5 Councilmember Harry Thomas Sr. and former D.C. Public School principal Romaine B. Thomas. Councilmember Thomas attended D.C. public schools and graduated from Woodrow Wilson High School. He holds a degree in Public Relations/Marketing from Bowie State University. Thomas was Vice President of Public Affairs for the Public Benefits Corporation (formerly D.C. General Hospital).

Thomas is a former Advisory Neighborhood Commissioner, and has served as Chair of the Woodridge Health Clinic. He is a past President of the D.C. Young Democrats and a former at-large elected member of the D.C. Democratic State party, for which he coordinated local and national events. Councilmember Thomas has worked for the national Democratic Party, holding the office of Treasurer. He has also served as the Adult and Youth Chair of the Neighborhood Planning Council. Councilmember Thomas is a member of the YMCA, NAACP, Omega Psi Phi fraternity, and Woodridge Boys and Girls Club.

== Political career ==
On September 12, 2006, Thomas won the Democratic primary for Ward 5 councilmember with 39 percent of the vote, beating 10 other candidates. The previous Ward 5 member, Vincent Orange, ran for mayor rather than running for reelection. On November 7, 2006, Thomas won the general election with 85 percent of the vote. He was re-elected in 2010.

=== Felony conviction and incarceration ===
On June 6, 2011, the D.C. Attorney General filed a civil lawsuit accusing Thomas of diverting $300,000 in public funds for personal use. Thomas was accused of using city grants that were earmarked for charity and youth baseball groups to pay for his personal expenses, including golfing vacations and an SUV, which was later seized by the FBI on December 2, 2011, in an ongoing investigation. Those baseball groups included the councilmember's own group, Team Thomas – although the Department of Consumer and Regulatory Affairs revoked corporate registration for Team Thomas in 2009, and the Internal Revenue Service never recognized it as a charity. The lawsuit was settled in July 2011 when Thomas agreed to repay the $300,000 in six installments over the next three years. Following this agreement, Thomas remained on the Council and continued to maintain he was innocent of criminal behavior as the United States Attorney's Office continued to investigate the case.

He resigned his seat on January 5, 2012, several hours after federal prosecutors filed criminal charges of embezzlement and filing false tax returns. Earlier that week he had failed to make his second installment payment on the repayment agreement, amid rumors of the pending criminal charges. Represented by lawyer Karl Racine, on January 6 he pleaded guilty to felony counts of theft of government funds and falsifying tax returns.

Thomas' 39-month prison sentence began in June 2013. In 2014, the United States Marshals Service flew Thomas to the District of Columbia to meet with the United States Attorney's Office for an undisclosed reason. In August 2015, Thomas was transferred to a half-way house in Maryland, where he stayed for six months. Thomas' incarceration ended in March 2015.

=== Life as a returning citizen ===
In 2020, Thomas became a committeeman for the District of Columbia Democratic State Committee, representing Ward 5. In 2023, he was elected chair of the Ward 5 Democrats in an uncontested election.
