= Tommy Wells =

American politician

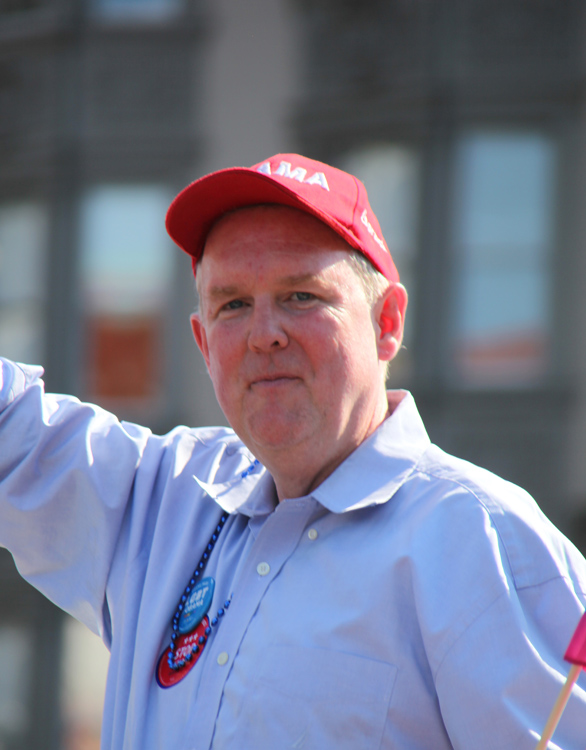
- Wells at the DC Pride Parade in 2012

Member of the Council of the District of Columbia from Ward 6
- In office January 2, 2007 – January 2, 2015
- Preceded by: Sharon Ambrose
- Succeeded by: Charles Allen

Personal details
- Born: Thomas Clayton Wells; February 27, 1957 (age 69) Austin, Texas, U.S.
- Party: Democratic
- Education: University of Alabama, Tuscaloosa (BS); University of Minnesota, Twin Cities (MSW); Catholic University (JD)

Thomas Clayton Wells (born February 27, 1957) is an American politician, social worker and lawyer from Washington, DC. He was a member of the Council of the District of Columbia where he served as a Democrat representing Ward 6. Wells later served under Muriel Bowser as director of the DC Mayor's Office of Policy and Legislative Affairs after serving as the director for the District Department of Energy & Environment (DOEE) for 8 years where he was chiefly responsible for protecting the environment and conserving the natural resources of the District of Columbia.

== Biography ==
Wells was born in Austin, Texas in 1957 and received his B.A. from the University of Alabama in 1979. He then pursued a master's degree in social work, earning an M.S.W. from the University of Minnesota in 1981. In 1991, he received his J.D. from Catholic University's Columbus School of Law.

Wells began his Washington, D.C., career in 1985 as a social worker in the District's child protective services agency. After six years with the agency, Wells became the director of the D.C. Consortium for Child Welfare, an organization of 20 nonprofit agencies that serve the city's children and families, until his election to the Council of the District of Columbia in 2006. He also served as a member of Advisory Neighborhood Commission 6B from 1995 to 2000 and Chair of ANC 6B from 1997 to 1998. He was elected to serve Wards 5 and 6 on the DC Board of Education from 2001 to 2006, and was elected to the DC Council in 2006, winning reelection in 2010.

In 2013, he announced he would not seek another term in his council seat and would instead run for mayor of the District of Columbia. Wells' chief of staff, Charles Allen, decided he would run for Wells' seat on the Council.

Wells has been married to Barbara Wells since 1988 and is a member of Christ Episcopal Church.

== Elections ==
Wells defeated Will Cobb (I) and Antonio (Tony) Williams (R) in the 2006 elections with 62% (8,992) of the vote compared to Cobb's 27% (3,908) and Williams' 11% (1,564).

Wells was re-elected for a second term in 2010. Wells defeated Jim DeMartino (R) in the 2010 election with 85% (16,256) of the vote, compared to DeMartino's 14% (2,674).
