= Greater Greater Washington =

Urbanist media and advocacy organization

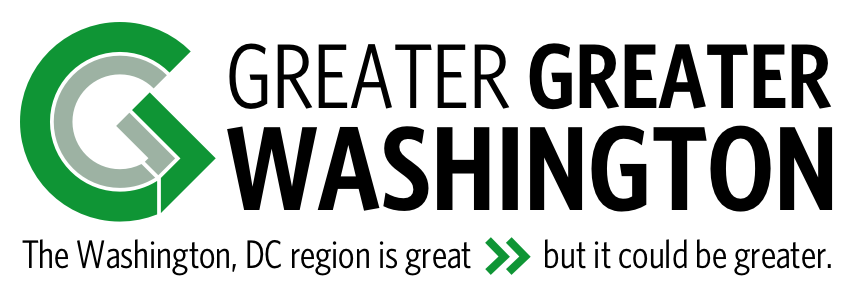
- Abbreviation: GGWash
- Formation: 2008; 18 years ago
- Founder: David Alpert
- Tax ID no.: 47-2738753
- Legal status: 501(c)(4) nonprofit
- Purpose: Urbanism
- Headquarters: 80 M St SE, Suite 100 Washington, D.C.
- Region served: Washington metropolitan area
- Methods: Advocacy; Education
- Executive Director: Chelsea Allinger
- Revenue: $2.6 million (2024)
- Expenses: $995,000 (2024)
- Website: ggwash.org

Greater Greater Washington (abbreviated as GGWash) is a 501(c)(4) nonprofit media and advocacy organization that promotes urbanist priorities around land use, transportation, and housing in the Washington metropolitan area. Founded as a blog in 2008 by former Google product manager David Alpert, the site grew into a group blog and later a nonprofit with full-time staff, paid contributors, and a network of more than 150 volunteer writers.

== History ==
=== Founding and early years (2008–2014) ===
Alpert, who had worked as a product manager at Google in California and New York, moved to Washington, D.C., in the late 2000s after his wife took a job at a local law firm. He had become interested in smart growth and urban planning after reading Christopher Leinberger's book The Option of Urbanism, and used proceeds from Google stock options to fund a blog about land use, transit, and development in the region. Greater Greater Washington launched in 2008, and The Washington Post's Marc Fisher named it the paper's "Blogger of the Month" in May of that year.

In its early years the site was an unpaid, volunteer-run group blog that Alpert ran from his apartment and funded himself, declining to sell advertising. The site began soliciting reader donations in 2014. Contributors, including urban planners, local officials, and other writers, used the platform to report on city meetings and planning documents, helping bring topics such as zoning and transit planning into mainstream local discussion.

=== Nonprofit status and Open Philanthropy funding (2015–2019) ===
In 2015, Greater Greater Washington was registered as a 501(c)(4) nonprofit organization, allowing it to pursue grants for advocacy in addition to its journalism. That same year, the organization secured multi-year funding from the Open Philanthropy Project, then run by Cari Tuna and Facebook co-founder Dustin Moskovitz. The grant funded the hiring of full-time editorial staff and a housing-policy advocate, and the organization moved out of Alpert's home into shared office space.

In early 2019, Alpert disclosed that Open Philanthropy had decided not to renew the grant after 2019, leaving the organization with an annual funding gap of roughly $125,000, and that GGWash had begun accepting advertising from organizations aligned with its mission as well as event sponsorships.

=== Leadership transition (2020–2021) ===
In July 2020, Alpert announced he would step down as the organization's leader, saying that he believed it was "good for organizations to be more than just an embodiment of one founder's own ideas." In April 2021, the board named Chelsea Allinger as the new executive director. Allinger, a longtime reader of the site who had been elected to her Advisory Neighborhood Commission in Mount Pleasant after attending a GGWash training, said she saw the organization as transitioning from "startup energy to more of a fully established nonprofit organization" and aimed to expand its fundraising and policy capacity.

== Editorial model and advocacy ==
Greater Greater Washington describes its publication as practicing "advocacy journalism," explicitly viewed through an urbanist lens favoring walkable, transit-oriented, sustainable, and equitable development. Although the editorial and advocacy operations share an overall mission, the organization says they are governed separately, with editorial staff and paid contributors refraining from lobbying or testifying on specific policies.

The publication is staffed by a small editorial team and supplemented by a network of more than 150 volunteer contributors. Its policy team has organized around issues such as affordable housing, zoning reform, and the Metro transit system. GGWash has reported that its activities have helped pressure the Washington Metropolitan Area Transit Authority to release its route and schedule data to outside app developers in 2009, contributed to the passage of a rewritten D.C. zoning code that legalized accessory dwelling units and reduced parking minimums, and coordinated a coalition that submitted amendments to the D.C. Comprehensive Plan aimed at increasing housing supply and protections against displacement.

The site also issues endorsements in local elections. In the 2018 D.C. Council at-large race, GGWash endorsed Elissa Silverman over the candidate backed by the Washington Post editorial board and Mayor Muriel Bowser; Silverman won re-election by a wide margin.
