= List of members of the Council of the District of Columbia =

The eight wards of Washington D.C. (2022–present)

These lists include all members of the Council of the District of Columbia since its creation in 1975. All members are elected to 4-year terms (except for the initial 2-year terms for half the members elected to the first council, in 1974).

== Pre-Home Rule History ==
=== Temporary Commissioners of the District of Columbia (1874–1878) ===
From 1874 to 1878 the District was administered by a three-member, temporary Board of Commissioners with both legislative and executive authority, all appointed by the President. They were assisted by an engineer (Captain Richard L. Hoxie). The law made no provision for a president to lead this board of temporary Commissioners, and none was ever elected, but Commissioner Dennison acted in that capacity at all board meetings he attended.

Background colors indicate party:

Democratic	Republican

Year	Commissioners		
1874	William Dennison	Henry T. Blow	John H. Ketcham
1875	William Dennison	Seth Ledyard Phelps	John H. Ketcham
1876	William Dennison	Seth Ledyard Phelps	John H. Ketcham
1877	William Dennison	Seth Ledyard Phelps	John H. Ketcham
1878	William Dennison	Seth Ledyard Phelps	Thomas Barbour Bryan

=== Board of Commissioners (1878–1967) ===
In 1878, the Board of Commissioners was made permanent and re-organized. From 1878 to 1967, the District was administered by this new three-member Board of Commissioners with both legislative and executive authority, all appointed by the President. The board comprised one Democrat, one Republican, and one representative from the Army Corps of Engineers with no specified party. The three Commissioners would then elect one of their number to serve as president of the board. While not quite analogous to the role of a mayor, the president of the board was the district's Chief Executive.

Background colors indicate party:

Democratic	Republican	Army Corps of Engineers (non-partisian)

=== Commissioner-council system (1967–1975) ===
On June 1, 1967, President Lyndon B. Johnson ordered that the 3-member commissioner system that had governed the District for nearly 100 years be replaced by a single commissioner and a 9-member city council all appointed by the President. The commissioner, sometimes referred to as the mayor-commissioner, would be able to veto the actions of the council, and council could overrule the veto with a 3/4ths majority. Congress had 60 days for either house to reject the rule. Only the House introduced a disapproval resolution, supported by Republicans and Southern Democrats, but it failed 244–160. Each member of the council served a 3-year term starting February 1, with seats staggered by three years; except for those appointed initially in 1967. In the event that a member's term expired, they would remain a member until a replacement was confirmed and sworn in. By law, a maximum of six members could be from any one party.

Because of a low salary and the fact that terms lasted until a replacement was available, membership was quite fluid. (Changes in italics)

- Nov 3, 1967 – Sept 13, 1968 – John W. Hechinger (chair), Walter Fauntroy (vice-chair), Stanley J. Anderson, Margaret A. Haywood, John Nevius, Polly Shackleton, William S. Thompson, J. C. Turner, Joseph P. Yeldell. (Haywood, Turner and Yelldell had terms that ended on Feb 1, 1968, but all three were reappointed.)
- Sept 13, 1968 – Oct 18, 1968 – Hechinger (chair), Fauntroy (vice-chair), Anderson, Haywood, Nevius, Shackleton, Thompson, Yeldell. (Turner resigned.)
- Oct 18, 1968 – March 13, 1969 – Hechinger (chair), Fauntroy (vice-chair), Anderson, Haywood, Nevius, Shackleton, Thompson, Phillip J. Daugherty and Yeldell. (Daugherty was appointed to fill Turner's seat.)
- March 13, 1969 – July 11, 1969 – Gilbert Hahn Jr (chair), Sterling Tucker (vice-chair), Anderson, Haywood, Jerry A. Moore Jr., Shackleton, Thompson, Daugherty and Yeldell. (Hahn, Tucker and Moore replaced Hechinger, Fauntroy and Nevius respectively; Nixon's first appointments as he shifted the council from majority Democrat to majority Republican.)
- July 11, 1969 – Oct 16, 1969 – Hahn (chair), Tucker (vice-chair), Anderson, Haywood, Shackleton, Moore, Daugherty and Yeldell. (Thompson resigned to be a judge.)
- Oct 16, 1969 – April 3, 1970 – Hahn (chair), Tucker (vice-chair), Anderson, Haywood, Shackleton, Moore, Henry S. Robinson, Daugherty and Yeldell. (Robinson appointed to fill Thompson's seat.)
- April 3, 1970 – Nov 30, 1970 – Hahn (chair), Tucker (vice-chair), Anderson, Haywood, Carlton W. Veazey, Moore, Robinson, Daugherty and Yeldell. (Anderson and Robinson were reappointed and Veazey replaced Shackleton.)
- Nov 30, 1970 – June 22, 1971 – Hahn (chair), Tucker (vice-chair), Anderson, Haywood, Veazey, Moore, Robinson and Daugherty. (Yeldell resigned to run for delegate.)
- June 22, 1971 – Nov 30, 1971 – Hahn (chair), Tucker (vice-chair), Anderson, Haywood, Veazey, Moore, Robinson, Henry K. Willard II and Yeldell. (Haywood was reappointed, Yeldell was appointed to his own vacancy and Willard replaced Daugherty.)
- Nov 30, 1971 – Jan 17, 1972 – Hahn (chair), Tucker (vice-chair), Anderson, Haywood, Veazey, Moore, Robinson, Willard. (Yeldell resigned to become the city's human resources director.)
- Jan 17, 1972 – March 18, 1972 – Hahn (chair), Tucker (vice-chair), Anderson, Haywood, Veazey, Moore, Robinson, Willard and Tedson J. Meyers (Meyers appointed to fill Yeldell's seat.)
- March 18, 1972 – May 3, 1972 – Hahn (chair), Tucker (vice-chair), Anderson, Haywood, Veazey, Robinson, Willard and Meyers. (Moore resigned to run for delegate.)
- May 3, 1972 – June 20, 1972 – Nevius (Chair), Tucker (vice-chair), Anderson, Haywood, Veazey, Robinson, Willard and Meyers. (Nevius appointed to replace Hahn as chair.)
- June 20, 1972 – July 11, 1972 – Nevius (chair), Tucker (vice-chair), Anderson, Haywood, Veazey, Robinson and Meyers. (Willard retired to focus on business.)
- July 11, 1972 – Oct 2, 1972 – Nevius (chair), Tucker (vice-chair), Anderson, Veazey, Robinson and Meyers. (Haywood resigned to become a judge.)
- Oct 2, 1972 – Aug 8, 1973 – Nevius (chair), Tucker (vice-chair), Anderson, Marjorie Parker, Veazey, Moore, Robinson, Rockwood H. Foster and Meyers. (Foster replaced Willard, Parker replaced Haywood and Moore reappointed to the seat he vacated.)
- Aug 8, 1973 – Jan 2, 1975 – Nevius (chair), Tucker (vice-chair), Marguerite C. Selden, Parker, Antoinette Ford, Moore, Robinson, Foster and Meyers. (Selden replaced Anderson, Ford replaced Veazey and Robinson was reappointed.)

On October 30, 1973, members voted to represent areas of town. They did not use the ward system, which had been created for the school board, but instead used the service area system created by the mayor in 1970. There were 8 wards, 9 service areas and 9 members of the council. They were assigned:

- Service area 1 (upper Ga Ave Corridor) – Moore
- Service area 2 (upper NE) – Robinson
- Service area 3 (NE, east of Anacostia) – Parker
- Service area 4 (SE east of Anacostia) – Ford
- Service area 5 (Capitol Hill and just east of Anacostia River) – Selden
- Service area 6 (Model cities: Ivy City, Stanton Park and Trinidad) – Tucker
- Service area 7 (Adams Morgan) – Tucker
- Service area 8 (west of Rock Creek park) – Foster
- Service area 9 (downtown and SW) – Meyers and Parker

==== Appointed members and tenure ====
- John W. Heckiner (1967–1969, chair)
- Walter Fauntroy (1967–1969, vice-chair)
- Stanley J. Anderson (1967–1973)
- Margaret A. Haywood (1967–1972)
- John Nevius (1967–1969, 1972–1975 as chair)
- Polly Shackleton (1967–1970)
- William S. Thompson (1967–1969)
- J. C. Turner (1967–1968)
- Joseph P. Yeldell (1967–1970) (1971)
- Phillip J. Daugherty (1968–1971)
- Gilbert Hahn Jr (1969–1972, chair)
- Sterling Tucker (1969–1975, vice-chair, longest serving member)
- Jerry A. Moore Jr. (1969–1972, 1972–1975)
- Henry S. Robinson (1969–1975)
- Carlton W. Veazey (1970–1973)
- Henry K. Willard II (1971–1972)
- Tedson J. Meyers (1972–1975)
- Marjorie Parker (1972–1975)
- Rockwood H. Foster (1972–1975)
- Marguerite C. Selden (1973–1975)
- Antoinette Ford (1973–1975)

== Tenure records ==
The chairman who served the longest uninterrupted period of time is Linda A. Cropp, who served 9 years, 146 days, from August 8, 1997, to January 1, 2007. David A. Clarke served the longest as chairman, counting all terms (with interruptions), serving 10 years, 185 days (from January 3, 1983, to January 3, 1991, and again from September 27, 1993, to his death on March 28, 1997). The chairman who served the shortest period of time is Kwame R. Brown, who served 521 days from January 2, 2011, to June 6, 2012.

The council member who served the longest uninterrupted period of time is Jack Evans, who served 28 years from May 13, 1991, to January 17, 2020. Evans also holds the record for serving the longest period of time counting interrupted service. The council member who served the shortest period of time is Arrington Dixon, who served 121 days between his special appointment to an at-large seat on August 15, 1997, and December 14, 1997 (when David Catania was sworn in after winning a special election on December 3, 1997).

The at-large council member who served the longest uninterrupted period of time is Hilda Mason, who served 21 years, 273 days from April 2, 1977, to January 1, 1999. Mason also holds the record for serving the longest period of time counting interrupted service. The Group 1 at-large council member who served the longest uninterrupted period of time is John L. Ray, who served 17 years, 359 days from January 8, 1979, to January 1, 1997. Ray also holds the record for the Group 1 at-large council member serving the longest period of time counting interrupted service. The Group 1 at-large council member who served the shortest period of time is Arrington Dixon. The Group 2 at-large council member who served the longest uninterrupted period of time is Hilda Mason. Mason also holds the record for the Group 2 at-large council member serving the longest period of time counting interrupted service. The Group 1 at-large council member who served the shortest period of time is Sekou Biddle, who served 123 days from his appointment on January 7, 2011, until May 9, 2011 (his successor, Vincent Orange, was sworn in on May 10 after a special election held April 26, 2011).

== Chairman ==
1. Sterling Tucker (D), 1975–1979
2. Arrington Dixon (D), 1979–1983
3. David A. Clarke (D), 1983–1991
4. John A. Wilson (D), 1991–1993
5. David A. Clarke (D), 1993–1997 (won special election after death of Wilson)
6. Linda W. Cropp (D), 1997–2007 (won special election after death of Clarke)
7. Vincent C. Gray (D), 2007–2011
8. Kwame R. Brown (D), 2011–2012
9. Phil Mendelson (D), 2012–present (won special election after Brown resigned)

== At-large members ==
There are four at-large members at any time, elected in groups of two. Group 1 was elected in 1974 to 2-year terms and elected in years divisible by 4 thereafter: 1976, 1980, ..., 2008, 2012, etc. Group 2 is elected in years divisible by 2 but not by 4: 1974, 1978, ..., 2010, 2014, etc. In 1974, Group 1 consisted of Marion Barry and Jerry A. Moore, Jr.

1. Douglas E. Moore (D), 1975–1979
2. Julius Hobson (Statehood), 1975–1977
3. Marion Barry (D), 1975–1979
4. Jerry A. Moore Jr. (R), 1975–1985
5. Hilda Mason (Statehood), 1977–1999 (appointed by party and then won special election after death of Hobson)
6. Betty Ann Kane (D), 1979–1991
7. John L. Ray (D), 1979–1997 (appointed by party and then won special election after Barry became mayor)
8. Carol Schwartz (R), 1985–1989
9. William Lightfoot (I), 1989–1997
10. Linda W. Cropp (D), 1991–1997
11. Harold Brazil (D), 1997–2005
12. Carol Schwartz (R), 1997–2009
13. Arrington Dixon (D), 1997 (appointed by party after Cropp became chairman)
14. David Catania (R; became I in 2004), 1997–2015 (won special election at end of Dixon's temporary appointment)
15. Phil Mendelson (D), 1999–2012
16. Kwame R. Brown (D), 2005–2011
17. Michael A. Brown (I), 2009–2013
18. Sekou Biddle (D), 2011 (appointed by party after Kwame Brown became chairman)
19. Vincent Orange (D), 2011–2016 (won special election at end of Biddle's temporary appointment)
20. Anita Bonds (D), 2012–present (appointed by party after Mendelson became chairman and later won a special election)
21. David Grosso (I), 2013–2021
22. Elissa Silverman (I), 2015–2023
23. Robert White (D), 2016–present (appointed by party following the resignation of Vincent Orange)
24. Christina Henderson (I), 2021–present
25. Kenyan McDuffie (I), 2023–2026
26. Doni Crawford (I), 2026 (appointed by council after McDuffie began run for mayor)
27. Elissa Silverman (I), 2026–present (won special election at end of Crawford's temporary appointment)

== Ward 1 member ==
The Ward 1 member is elected in years divisible by 2 but not by 4: 1974, 1978, ..., 2010, 2014, etc.

1. David A. Clarke (D), 1975–1983
2. Frank Smith (D), 1983–1999
3. Jim Graham (D), 1999–2015
4. Brianne Nadeau (D), 2015–present

== Ward 2 member ==
The Ward 2 member was elected in 1974 to a 2-year term and elected in years divisible by 4 thereafter: 1976, 1980, ..., 2008, 2012, etc.

1. John A. Wilson (D), 1975–1991
2. Jack Evans (D), 1991–2020 (won special election after Wilson became chairman, resigned in January 2020, due to ethics violations)
3. Brooke Pinto (D), 2020–present (won special election after Evans resigned)

== Ward 3 member ==
The Ward 3 member is elected in years divisible by 2 but not by 4: 1974, 1978, ..., 2010, 2014, etc.

1. Polly Shackleton (D), 1975–1987
2. James E. Nathanson (D), 1987–1995
3. Kathleen Patterson (D), 1995–2007
4. Mary Cheh (D), 2007–2023
5. Matthew Frumin (D), 2023–present

== Ward 4 member ==
The Ward 4 member was elected in 1974 to a 2-year term and elected in years divisible by 4 thereafter: 1976, 1980, ..., 2008, 2012, etc.

1. Arrington Dixon (D), 1975–1979
2. Charlene Drew Jarvis (D), 1979–2001 (won special election after Dixon became chairman)
3. Adrian Fenty (D), 2001–2007
4. Muriel Bowser (D), 2007–2015 (won special election after Fenty became mayor)
5. Brandon Todd (D), 2015–2021 (won special election after Bowser became mayor)
6. Janeese Lewis George (D), 2021–present

== Ward 5 member ==
The Ward 5 member is elected in years divisible by 2 but not by 4: 1974, 1978, ..., 2010, 2014, etc.

1. William Spaulding (D), 1975–1987
2. Harry Thomas, Sr. (D), 1987–1999
3. Vincent Orange (D), 1999–2007
4. Harry Thomas, Jr. (D), 2007–2012 (resigned)
5. Kenyan McDuffie (D), 2012–2023 (won special election after Thomas' resignation)
6. Zachary Parker (D), 2023–present

== Ward 6 member ==
The Ward 6 member is elected in years divisible by 2 but not by 4: 1974, 1978, ..., 2010, 2014, etc.

1. Nadine Winter (D), 1975–1991
2. Harold Brazil (D), 1991–1997
3. Sharon Ambrose (D), 1997–2007 (won special election after Brazil became at-large)
4. Tommy Wells (D), 2007–2015
5. Charles Allen (D), 2015–present

== Ward 7 member ==
The Ward 7 member was elected in 1974 to a 2-year term and elected in years divisible by 4 thereafter: 1976, 1980, ..., 2008, 2012, etc.

1. Willie Hardy (D), 1975–1981
2. H. R. Crawford (D), 1981–1993
3. Kevin P. Chavous (D), 1993–2005
4. Vincent C. Gray (D), 2005–2007
5. Yvette Alexander (D), 2007–2017 (won special election after Gray became chairman)
6. Vincent C. Gray (D), 2017–2025
7. Wendell Felder (D), 2025–present

== Ward 8 member ==
The Ward 8 member was elected in 1974 to a 2-year term and elected in years divisible by 4 thereafter: 1976, 1980, ..., 2008, 2012, etc.

1. James Coates (D), 1975–1977
2. Wilhelmina Rolark (D), 1977–1993
3. Marion Barry (D), 1993–1995
4. Eydie Whittington (D), 1995–1997 (won special election after Barry became mayor)
5. Sandy Allen (D), 1997–2005
6. Marion Barry (D), 2005–2014
7. LaRuby May (D), 2015–2017 (won special election after Barry died)
8. Trayon White (D); 2017–2025, 2025–present (won special election after ouster)

== Table ==
Background colors indicate party:

Democratic	Republican	Statehood	independent

Year	Chair	At-large councillors				Ward-level councillors								Makeup
Year	Chair	At-large councillors				1	2	3	4	5	6	7	8	Makeup
1975	Tucker	D. Moore	Hobson	Barry	J. Moore	Clarke	Wilson	Shackleton	Dixon	Spaulding	Winter	Hardy	Coates	
1976	Tucker	D. Moore	Hobson	Barry	J. Moore	Clarke	Wilson	Shackleton	Dixon	Spaulding	Winter	Hardy	Coates	
1977	Tucker	D. Moore	Mason	Barry	J. Moore	Clarke	Wilson	Shackleton	Dixon	Spaulding	Winter	Hardy	Rolark	
1978	Tucker	D. Moore	Mason	Barry	J. Moore	Clarke	Wilson	Shackleton	Dixon	Spaulding	Winter	Hardy	Rolark	
1979	Dixon	Kane	Mason	Ray	J. Moore	Clarke	Wilson	Shackleton	Jarvis	Spaulding	Winter	Hardy	Rolark	
1980	Dixon	Kane	Mason	Ray	J. Moore	Clarke	Wilson	Shackleton	Jarvis	Spaulding	Winter	Hardy	Rolark	
1981	Dixon	Kane	Mason	Ray	J. Moore	Clarke	Wilson	Shackleton	Jarvis	Spaulding	Winter	Crawford	Rolark	
1982	Dixon	Kane	Mason	Ray	J. Moore	Clarke	Wilson	Shackleton	Jarvis	Spaulding	Winter	Crawford	Rolark	
1983	Clarke	Kane	Mason	Ray	J. Moore	Smith	Wilson	Shackleton	Jarvis	Spaulding	Winter	Crawford	Rolark	
1984	Clarke	Kane	Mason	Ray	J. Moore	Smith	Wilson	Shackleton	Jarvis	Spaulding	Winter	Crawford	Rolark	
1985	Clarke	Kane	Mason	Ray	Schwartz	Smith	Wilson	Shackleton	Jarvis	Spaulding	Winter	Crawford	Rolark	
1986	Clarke	Kane	Mason	Ray	Schwartz	Smith	Wilson	Shackleton	Jarvis	Spaulding	Winter	Crawford	Rolark	
1987	Clarke	Kane	Mason	Ray	Schwartz	Smith	Wilson	Nathanson	Jarvis	Thomas Sr.	Winter	Crawford	Rolark	
1988	Clarke	Kane	Mason	Ray	Schwartz	Smith	Wilson	Nathanson	Jarvis	Thomas Sr.	Winter	Crawford	Rolark	
1989	Clarke	Kane	Mason	Ray	Lightfoot	Smith	Wilson	Nathanson	Jarvis	Thomas Sr.	Winter	Crawford	Rolark	
1990	Clarke	Kane	Mason	Ray	Lightfoot	Smith	Wilson	Nathanson	Jarvis	Thomas Sr.	Winter	Crawford	Rolark	
1991	Wilson	Cropp	Mason	Ray	Lightfoot	Smith	Evans	Nathanson	Jarvis	Thomas Sr.	Brazil	Crawford	Rolark	
1992	Wilson	Cropp	Mason	Ray	Lightfoot	Smith	Evans	Nathanson	Jarvis	Thomas Sr.	Brazil	Crawford	Rolark	
1993	Clarke	Cropp	Mason	Ray	Lightfoot	Smith	Evans	Nathanson	Jarvis	Thomas Sr.	Brazil	Chavous	Barry	
1994	Clarke	Cropp	Mason	Ray	Lightfoot	Smith	Evans	Nathanson	Jarvis	Thomas Sr.	Brazil	Chavous	Barry	
1995	Clarke	Cropp	Mason	Ray	Lightfoot	Smith	Evans	Patterson	Jarvis	Thomas Sr.	Brazil	Chavous	Whittington	
1996	Clarke	Cropp	Mason	Ray	Lightfoot	Smith	Evans	Patterson	Jarvis	Thomas Sr.	Brazil	Chavous	Whittington	
1997	Cropp	Dixon	Mason	Brazil	Schwartz	Smith	Evans	Patterson	Jarvis	Thomas Sr.	Ambrose	Chavous	S. Allen	
1998	Cropp	Catania	Mason	Brazil	Schwartz	Smith	Evans	Patterson	Jarvis	Thomas Sr.	Ambrose	Chavous	S. Allen	
1999	Cropp	Catania	Mendelson	Brazil	Schwartz	Graham	Evans	Patterson	Jarvis	Orange	Ambrose	Chavous	S. Allen	
2000	Cropp	Catania	Mendelson	Brazil	Schwartz	Graham	Evans	Patterson	Jarvis	Orange	Ambrose	Chavous	S. Allen	
2001	Cropp	Catania	Mendelson	Brazil	Schwartz	Graham	Evans	Patterson	Fenty	Orange	Ambrose	Chavous	S. Allen	
2002	Cropp	Catania	Mendelson	Brazil	Schwartz	Graham	Evans	Patterson	Fenty	Orange	Ambrose	Chavous	S. Allen	
2003	Cropp	Catania	Mendelson	Brazil	Schwartz	Graham	Evans	Patterson	Fenty	Orange	Ambrose	Chavous	S. Allen	
2004	Cropp	Catania	Mendelson	Brazil	Schwartz	Graham	Evans	Patterson	Fenty	Orange	Ambrose	Chavous	S. Allen	
2005	Cropp	Catania	Mendelson	K. Brown	Schwartz	Graham	Evans	Patterson	Fenty	Orange	Ambrose	Gray	Barry	
2006	Cropp	Catania	Mendelson	K. Brown	Schwartz	Graham	Evans	Patterson	Fenty	Orange	Ambrose	Gray	Barry	
2007	Gray	Catania	Mendelson	K. Brown	Schwartz	Graham	Evans	Cheh	Bowser	Thomas Jr.	Wells	Alexander	Barry	
2008	Gray	Catania	Mendelson	K. Brown	Schwartz	Graham	Evans	Cheh	Bowser	Thomas Jr.	Wells	Alexander	Barry	
2009	Gray	Catania	Mendelson	K. Brown	M. Brown	Graham	Evans	Cheh	Bowser	Thomas Jr.	Wells	Alexander	Barry	
2010	Gray	Catania	Mendelson	K. Brown	M. Brown	Graham	Evans	Cheh	Bowser	Thomas Jr.	Wells	Alexander	Barry	
2011	K. Brown	Catania	Mendelson	Biddle	M. Brown	Graham	Evans	Cheh	Bowser	Thomas Jr.	Wells	Alexander	Barry	
2011	K. Brown	Catania	Mendelson	Orange	M. Brown	Graham	Evans	Cheh	Bowser	Thomas Jr.	Wells	Alexander	Barry	
2012	Mendelson	Catania	Bonds	Orange	M. Brown	Graham	Evans	Cheh	Bowser	McDuffie	Wells	Alexander	Barry	
2013	Mendelson	Catania	Bonds	Orange	Grosso	Graham	Evans	Cheh	Bowser	McDuffie	Wells	Alexander	Barry	
2014	Mendelson	Catania	Bonds	Orange	Grosso	Graham	Evans	Cheh	Bowser	McDuffie	Wells	Alexander	Barry	
2015	Mendelson	Silverman	Bonds	Orange	Grosso	Nadeau	Evans	Cheh	Todd	McDuffie	C. Allen	Alexander	May	
2016	Mendelson	Silverman	Bonds	Orange	Grosso	Nadeau	Evans	Cheh	Todd	McDuffie	C. Allen	Alexander	May	
2017	Mendelson	Silverman	Bonds	R. White	Grosso	Nadeau	Evans	Cheh	Todd	McDuffie	C. Allen	Gray	T. White	
2018	Mendelson	Silverman	Bonds	R. White	Grosso	Nadeau	Evans	Cheh	Todd	McDuffie	C. Allen	Gray	T. White	
2019	Mendelson	Silverman	Bonds	R. White	Grosso	Nadeau	Evans	Cheh	Todd	McDuffie	C. Allen	Gray	T. White	
2020	Mendelson	Silverman	Bonds	R. White	Grosso	Nadeau	Pinto	Cheh	Todd	McDuffie	C. Allen	Gray	T. White	
2021	Mendelson	Silverman	Bonds	R. White	Henderson	Nadeau	Pinto	Cheh	Lewis George	McDuffie	C. Allen	Gray	T. White	
2022	Mendelson	Silverman	Bonds	R. White	Henderson	Nadeau	Pinto	Cheh	Lewis George	McDuffie	C. Allen	Gray	T. White	
2023	Mendelson	McDuffie	Bonds	R. White	Henderson	Nadeau	Pinto	Frumin	Lewis George	Parker	C. Allen	Gray	T. White	
2024	Mendelson	McDuffie	Bonds	R. White	Henderson	Nadeau	Pinto	Frumin	Lewis George	Parker	C. Allen	Gray	T. White	
2025	Mendelson	McDuffie	Bonds	R. White	Henderson	Nadeau	Pinto	Frumin	Lewis George	Parker	C. Allen	Felder	vacant (Note: Special election held July 15, 2025)	
2026	Mendelson	Crawford (Note: Appointed after McDuffie resigned in January; special election held in June)	Bonds	R. White	Henderson	Nadeau	Pinto	Frumin	Lewis George	Parker	C. Allen	Felder	T. White	
2026	Mendelson	Silverman (Note: Took office after election results were certified July 17)	Bonds	Holtz	Henderson	Nadeau	Pinto	Frumin	Lewis George	Parker	C. Allen	Felder	T. White	
2027	Mendelson	Silverman	Owolewa	TBD	Henderson	Raj	Pinto	Frumin	TBD	Parker	C. Allen	Felder	T. White	

== Ward Maps ==
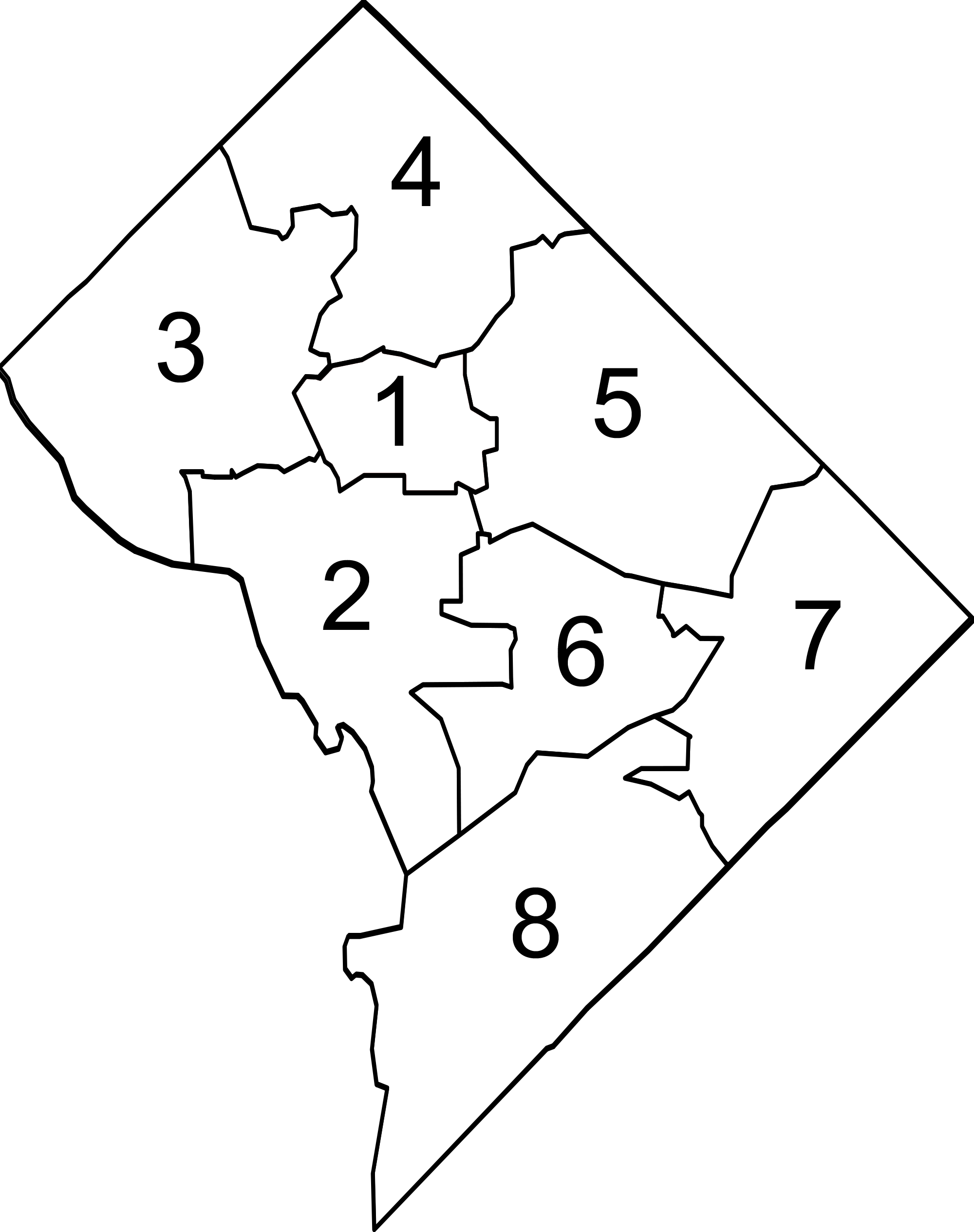
2003–2013

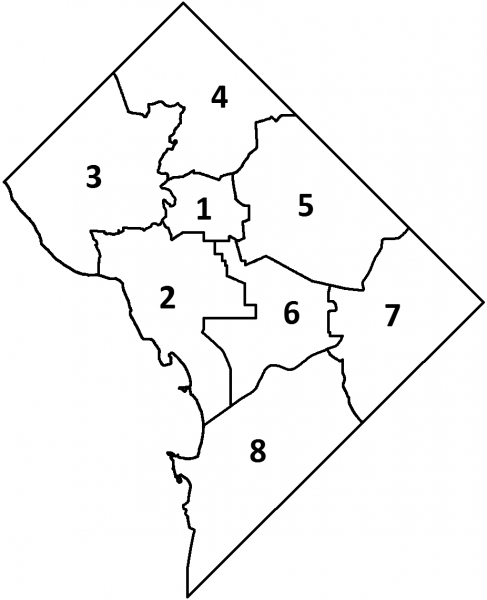
2012–2022

2022–present

== See also ==
- Council of the District of Columbia
- List of mayors of Washington, D.C.
- Political party strength in Washington, D.C.
- District of Columbia's at-large congressional district
