= 1993 Council of the District of Columbia special election =

- September 14, 1993
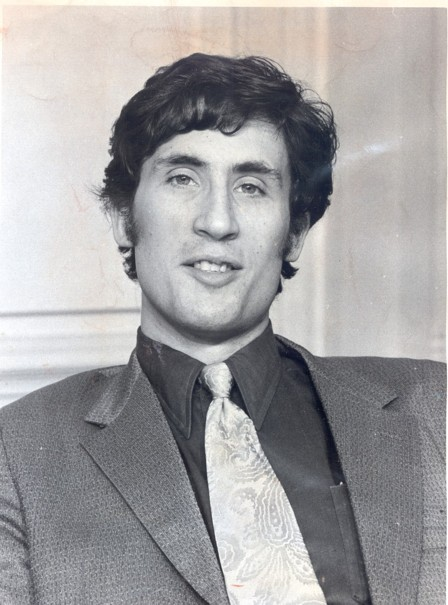

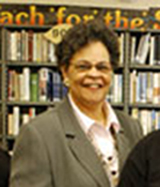

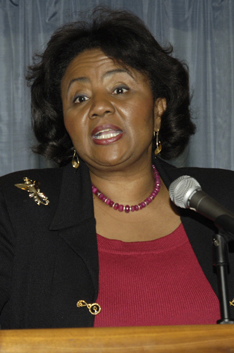
Nominee	David A. Clarke	Charlene Drew Jarvis	Linda Cropp
Party	Democratic	Democratic	Democratic
Popular vote	39,029	23,840	13,010
Percentage	47.12%	28.78%	15.71%
Chairperson before election
John L. Ray
(interim)
Democratic
Elected Chairperson
David A. Clarke
Democratic

The 1993 Council of the District of Columbia special election was held on September 14, 1993, to elect the position of Chairperson of the Council of the District of Columbia. The election was called following the death of incumbent chairperson John A. Wilson.

== Background ==
Incumbent chairperson John A. Wilson had served on Council since 1975 as the councilmember for Ward 2 before winning election as chairperson in the 1990 election. He died by suicide on May 19, 1993 and was replaced by John L. Ray as acting chair, who did not run for the seat in the special election. Vincent Orange, who had yet to be elected to local government at this point, was disqualified from the ballot after the Board of Elections found that his petition fell about 160 signatures of the 3,000 required to make the ballot. This was the first election since the 1992 passage of Initiative 41, a ballot measure limiting individual contributions to political campaigns to $100.

== Candidates ==
=== Democratic Party ===
- David A. Clarke, former councilmember from Ward 1 and former chairperson
- Linda Cropp, incumbent At-large councilmember
- Marie Drissel, community activist
- Charlene Drew Jarvis, incumbent councilmember from Ward 4

Disqualified

- Vincent Orange

Endorsements

David A. Clarke

Federal Officials

- Tom Harkin, member of the United States House of Representatives from Iowa's 5th congressional district

Individuals

- H. Beecher Hicks, pastor of the Metropolitan Baptist Church

Local Officials

- Hilda Mason, incumbent At-large member
- Frank Smith, incumbent Ward 1 councilmember

Organizations

- Metropolitan Washington AFL-CIO
- National Fraternal Order of Police
Linda Cropp

Local officials

- Kevin Chavous, incumbent Ward 7 Councilmember
- William Lightfoot, incumbent Independent At-large Councilmember
- Harry Thomas Sr., incumbent Ward 5 Councilmember

Publications

- The Washington Post
Charlene Drew Jarvis

Individuals

- H. H. Brookins, regional Bishop for the African Methodist Episcopal Church

Labor unions

- American Federation of State, County and Municipal Employees district council 20

Local officials

- Marion Barry, former mayor and incumbent Ward 8 councilmember
- Jack Evans (Washington, D.C., politician), incumbent Ward 2 councilmember
- John L. Ray, acting chairperson and incumbent At-large councilmember

Organizations

- D.C. Association of Realtors
- D.C. Nurses Association
- Gertrude Stein Club
- Greater Washington Board of Trade
- Medical Society of the District of Columbia

=== Socialist Workers Party ===
- Emily Fitzsimmons

== General election ==
1993 Council of the District of Columbia special election
Party	Candidate	Votes	%
Democratic	David A. Clarke	39,029	47.12%
Democratic	Charlene Drew Jarvis	23,840	28.78%
Democratic	Linda Cropp	13,010	15.71%
Democratic	Marie Drissel	5,123	6.18%
Socialist Workers	Emily Fitzsimmons	542	0.65%
Write-in		1,290	1.56%
Total votes		82,834	100%
