= Vincent C. Gray =

Mayor of the District of Columbia from 2011 to 2015

Vince Gray
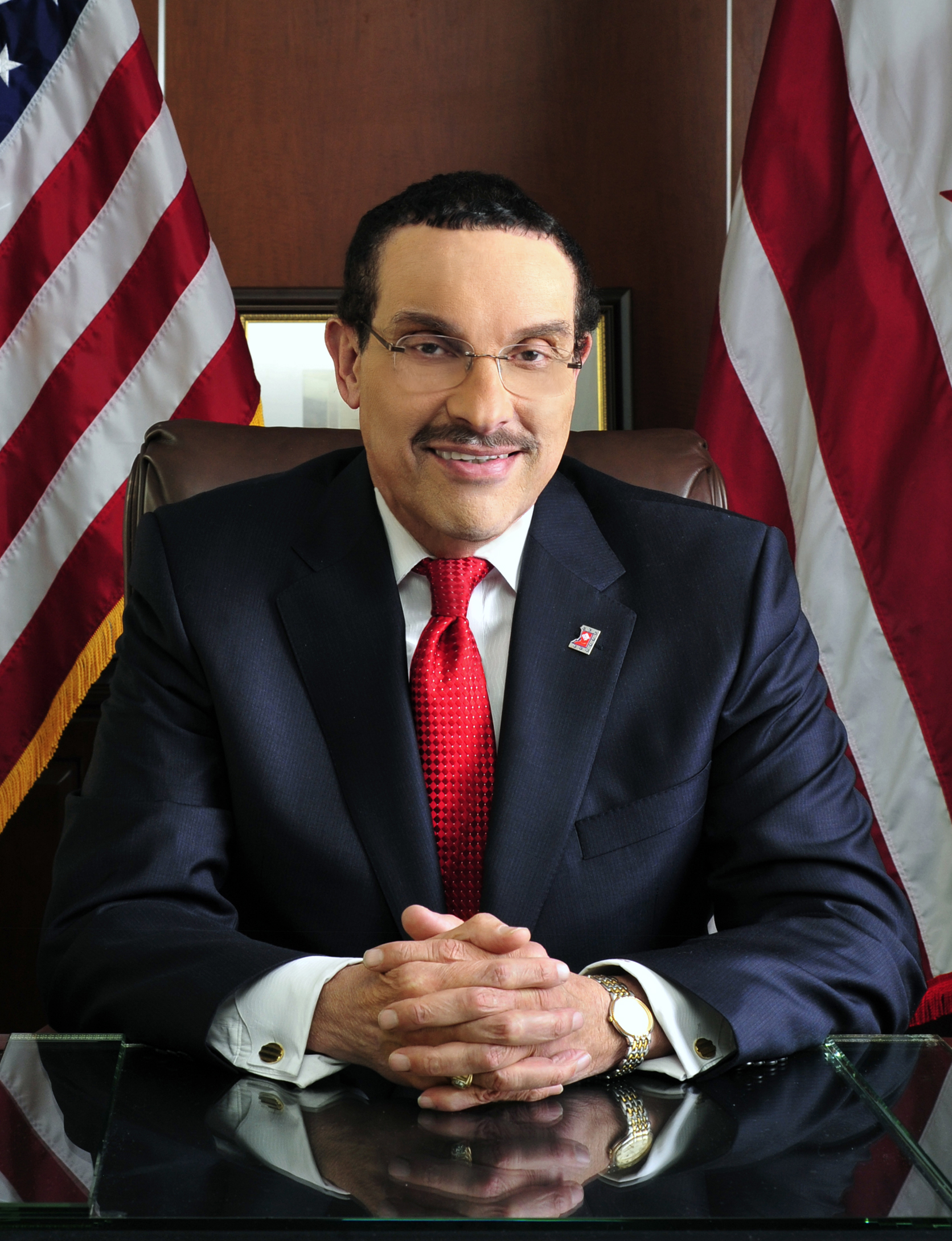
- Official portrait, 2011

Member of the Council of the District of Columbia from the 7th ward
- In office January 2, 2017 – January 2, 2025
- Preceded by: Yvette Alexander
- Succeeded by: Wendell Felder
- In office January 2, 2005 – January 2, 2007
- Preceded by: Kevin Chavous
- Succeeded by: Yvette Alexander

7th Mayor of the District of Columbia
- In office January 2, 2011 – January 2, 2015
- Preceded by: Adrian Fenty
- Succeeded by: Muriel Bowser

7th Chair of the Council of the District of Columbia
- In office January 3, 2007 – January 2, 2011
- Preceded by: Linda Cropp
- Succeeded by: Kwame Brown

Personal details
- Born: Vincent Condol Gray; November 8, 1942 (age 83) Washington, D.C., U.S.
- Party: Democratic
- Spouse(s): Loretta (died 1998) Dawn Kum (m. 2019)
- Children: 2
- Education: George Washington University (BS)
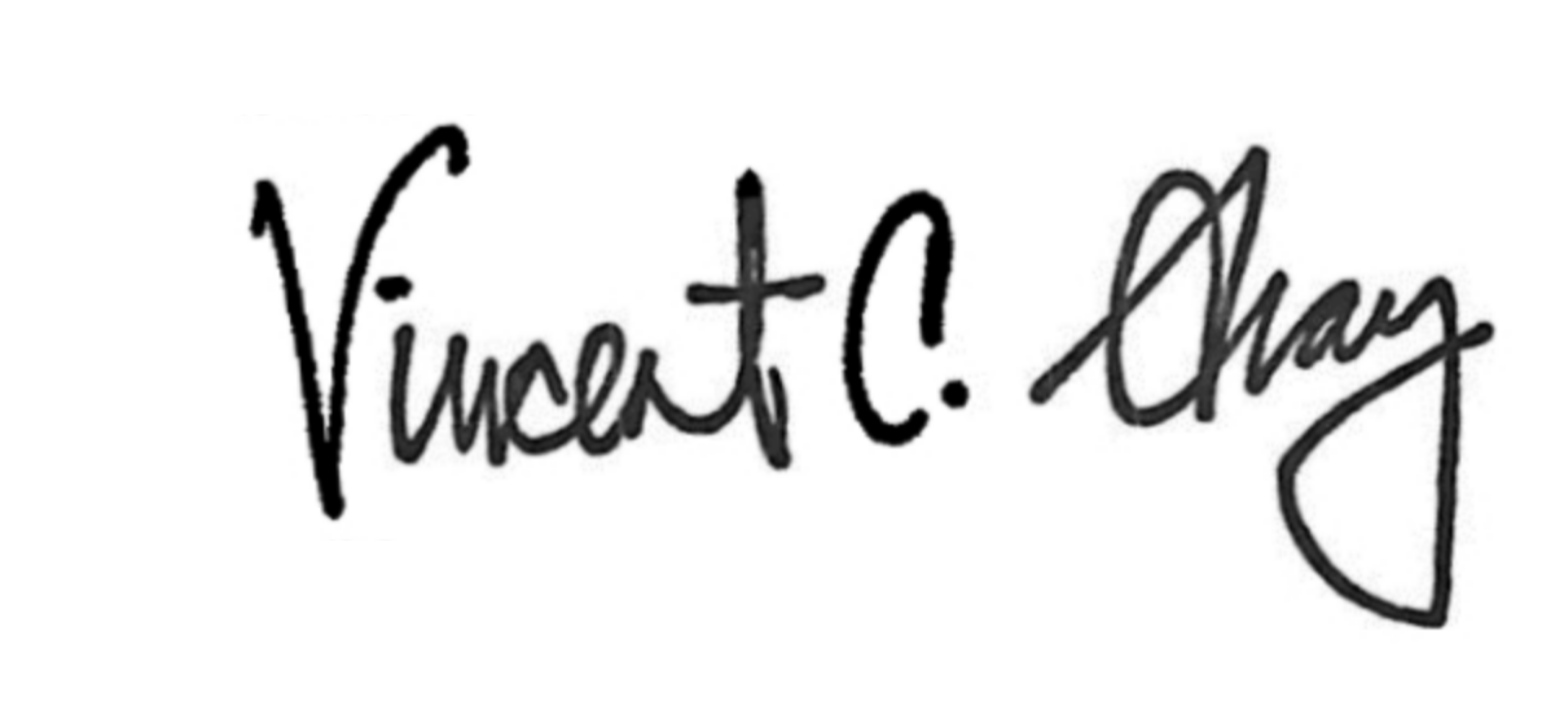
- Signature

Vincent Condol Gray (born November 8, 1942) is an American politician who served on the Council of the District of Columbia representing Ward 7 from 2017 to 2025. He was the mayor of the District of Columbia from 2011 to 2015.

He served as mayor for one term, losing his bid for reelection in the Democratic primary to D.C. Council member Muriel Bowser in the 2014 election. Prior to his inauguration as mayor in January 2011, Gray served as chairman of the Council of the District of Columbia, and as councilmember for Ward 7. In the 1990s he also served as director of the DC Department of Human Services. In June 2016, he defeated incumbent Yvette Alexander in the Democratic primary for the council seat he previously held in Ward 7.

== Early life and career ==
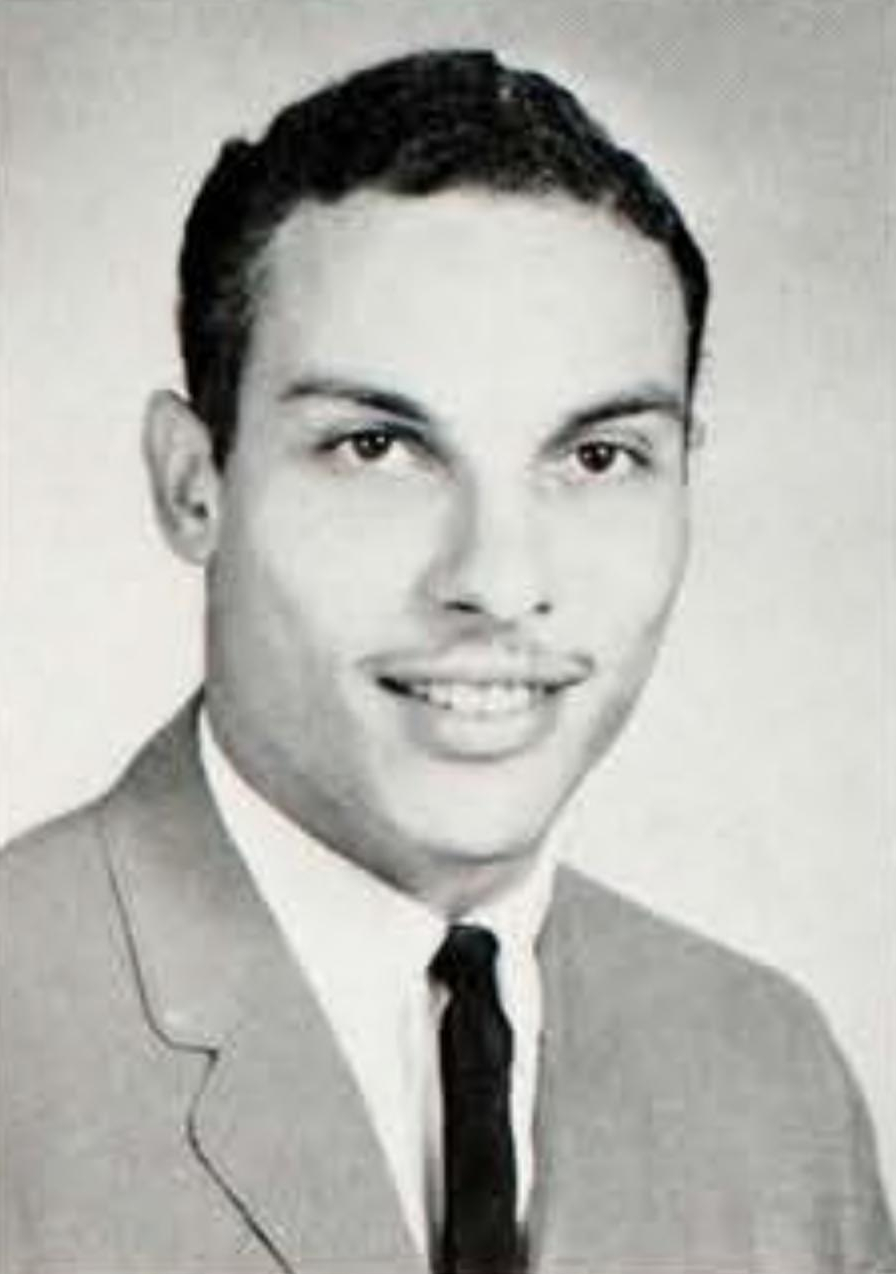
Gray in the George Washington University yearbook, 1964

Gray was born on November 8, 1942 at the Freedman's Hospital in Washington, DC, and graduated from Dunbar High School. In 1964 he earned a B.S. in psychology at George Washington University, where he also took graduate courses. Gray was one of the first African Americans to join the Jewish fraternity Tau Epsilon Phi. While in the fraternity, he was the first to serve two consecutive terms as president. Other school activities included the Newman Catholic Center, as well as football and basketball intramurals. Gray is also an avid participant in hand dancing, a D.C.-area derivative of Lindy hop.

Gray began his political career with the D.C. Arc, where he successfully advocated for innovative public policy initiatives on behalf of people with intellectual disabilities. In 1991, then-Mayor Sharon Pratt Kelly appointed Gray to the post of director of the DC Department of Human Services.

Gray became the founding executive director of Covenant House Washington in December 1994. Over a decade, the agency grew from a van outreach program to a multisite agency serving homeless youth in the city's Southeast and Northeast communities.

== Council of the District of Columbia ==
In the September 2004 primary election, Gray defeated Kevin P. Chavous, the incumbent Ward 7 member of the Council of the District of Columbia, and went on to win the November general election with 91% of the vote. He was sworn in as a member of the council on January 2, 2005, and was a member of the council's Committees on Health; Economic Development; Human Services; and Education, Libraries and Recreation. Chairman Linda W. Cropp also appointed him to chair a Special Committee on Prevention of Youth Violence.

In 2006, when Cropp decided not to run for another term as chairman but to run for mayor instead, Gray ran for chairman. He defeated his council colleague Kathleen Patterson in the Democratic primary, 57% to 43%, and then won the general election unopposed. Gray ran his campaign under the banner "One City" and focused on unity among the disparate racial and economic groups in Washington, D.C.

In 2008, Gray successfully led his Council colleagues in passing the "Pre-K Enhancement and Expansion Act of 2008", a program to provide universal pre-kindergarten to every three- and four-year-old in the District of Columbia by 2014, to increase early intervention and enhancement services for student success.

== Mayor of the District of Columbia ==
=== 2010 campaign ===
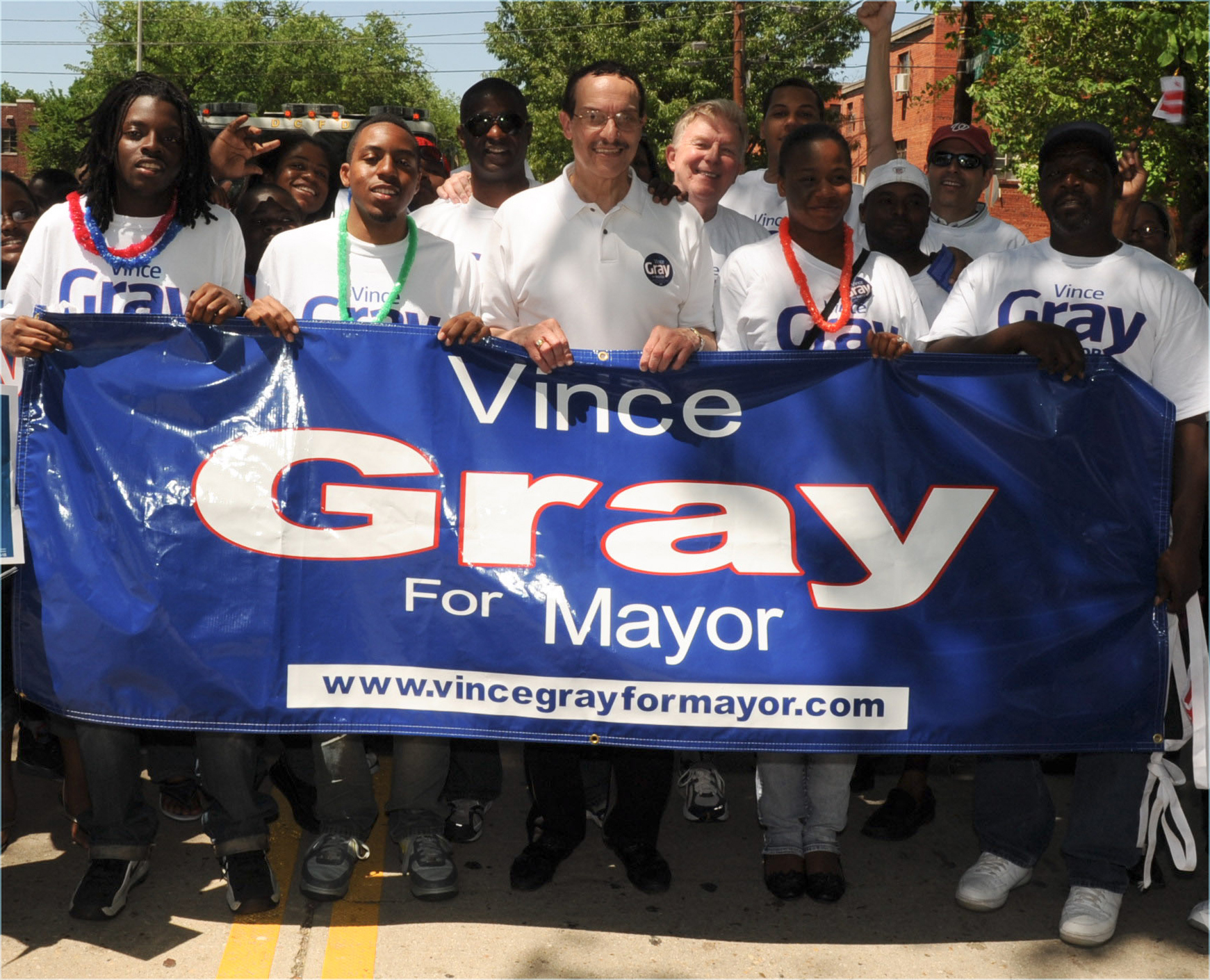
Gray at the Nannie Helen Burroughs Day Parade on May 8, 2010.

Gray formally entered the race for Mayor of the District of Columbia on March 30, 2010. His campaign adopted the slogan, commonly used during his time as Council Chairman, "One City. Leadership We Need". A Washington Post poll conducted in January 2010 showed Gray leading the incumbent mayor, Adrian Fenty, 38 percent to 31 percent among voters who were "certain" to participate in the September 14 Democratic Primary. The Washington Post noted that the poll's results were an indication of voters' disapproval of Fenty, rather than approval of Gray, because 36 percent of registered Democrats had no opinion of Gray. An August Washington Post poll found Gray with a 17-point advantage among likely voters and a 13-point lead among Democratic voters. In the event, Gray defeated Fenty by 13,124 votes.

=== Activities as Mayor ===
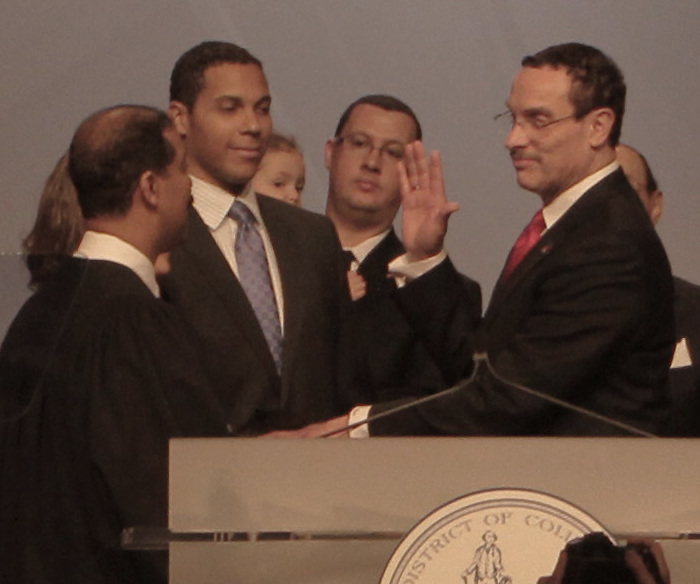
Gray was sworn in on January 2, 2011.

In order to save the District $19 million in 2011, Gray proposed to furlough most District employees, including teachers. Workers would not be paid on four holidays, namely President's Day, Emancipation Day, Memorial Day, and Independence Day. The District Council voted in favor of the idea as part of a plan to save over $19 million for the District. On Presidents' Day, February 21, 2011, over 200 emergency calls made to 911 went unanswered since dispatchers were furloughed.

In response to a proposal by Congress to restart a school voucher program in the District, Gray said he was against the idea.

During the April 11, 2011, debates on the 2011 United States federal budget, Mayor Gray and several other D.C. elected officials joined city residents outside the Hart Senate Office Building to protest budgetary line items that restricted the city's ability to spend its own locally raised funds. In particular, the budget limits the city's ability to spend money on abortion services and reauthorizes a school voucher program that the city government opposes. U.S. Capitol Police arrested several protesters, including Vincent Gray, for blocking automobile traffic. Speaking to the press before the arrest, Gray said, "This is an absolute travesty. All we want to do is spend our own money... Why should women in the District of Columbia be subjected to a set of rules that no other woman is subjected to?"

=== Sulaimon Brown controversy ===
Amidst the reports of budget tightening and city employee furloughs in the early weeks of the Gray administration, an exposé in The Washington Post revealed that Gray had hired a larger senior staff than his predecessors, and for substantially more money. Among the newly hired top officials was Sulaimon Brown, who had been hired as a special senior assistant in the Department of Health Care Finance for $110,000. Brown was best known as a fringe candidate in the 2010 mayoral election (ultimately receiving just over 200 votes) who, despite being his opponent, encouraged voters to support Gray (if not himself) and denigrated then-incumbent mayor Fenty. The news of the hiring led to charges of cronyism from the local media. However, when the Washington City Paper four days later linked Brown to a 1991 gun charge, a 1995 conviction for unlawful entry, and a 2007 restraining order against a 13-year-old girl, Brown was fired and escorted by security from his office on the morning of February 24.

In response to his termination, Brown made allegations to The Washington Post that he had made a secret agreement with Gray during the 2010 mayoral campaign to remain in the race and continue attacking Fenty in his public appearances, in exchange for a job with Gray's administration if Gray won the election. Brown also claimed to have received cash payments from Gray campaign aides Lorraine Green and Howard Brooks; according to the Post, Brown's cellphone records indicated 29 telephone calls to Brooks between June and September 2010 from Gray and Green, and text messages from Gray's phone number seemed to lend credence to Brown's story.

Gray flatly denied Brown's allegations, but acknowledged "missteps" in his administration's job vetting process and called for an investigation by the city attorney general and the DC Council. Brown began meeting with federal officials from the U.S. Attorney's office, the FBI, and staff of the House Oversight and Government Committee, who said that they were "assessing" his allegations. Meanwhile, allegations of nepotism, poor vetting, and other unethical hiring practices within the Gray administration continued to surface, with reports published that Gray had hired the children of four high-level officials, including Green and Brooks; that Brooks had overcharged the operator of the Georgia Lottery more than $1 million in the late 1990s; and that the salaries of several of Gray's appointees, including his chief of staff and city administrator, were higher than permitted by District law.

On March 10, 2011, District Councilmember Jack Evans, chairman of the Council's Committee on Finance and Revenue, announced that he was postponing "indefinitely" Gray's nomination of Green to chair the Washington Convention and Sports Authority. The same day, Gray announced that he had retained the services of Robert S. Bennett, the attorney who represented President Bill Clinton during the Lewinsky scandal, as his legal counsel.

=== Campaign finance scandal ===
In October 2011, The Washington Post reported that the United States Attorney's Office was investigating, subpoenaing documents, interviewing campaign staff members, and looking into money-order donations possibly in excess of District regulations. Seven months later, on May 22, 2012, Gray's 2010 campaign treasurer Thomas Gore pleaded guilty in federal court to illegally diverting campaign funds to Brown and to obstructing justice by shredding documents related to the transactions. Two days later, Howard Brooks pleaded guilty to lying to federal investigators, admitting that he had given over $7,800 in money orders to Sulaimon Brown during the 2010 mayoral race.

On July 10, 2012, a third campaign official, Eugenia Clarke-Harris, pleaded guilty to campaign corruption charges. In admitting to the charges, Harris disclosed that Gray's official 2010 campaign had been aided by a secret shadow campaign, using $650,000 in illegally obtained financing from wealthy D.C. contractor Jeff Thompson—a third of the total expenditures by the Gray campaign. Gray was not charged with any wrongdoing and no evidence was presented that he had any knowledge of the shadow campaign; however, U.S. Attorney Ron Machen said that the mayor was still under investigation.

On July 11, 2012, Gray acknowledged at a press conference that his mayoral campaign had had "issues" and was "not the campaign that we intended to run." He denied any intention of resigning as mayor. That same day, however, three members and former colleagues of Gray's on the D.C. Council called on Gray to resign. A poll published eight days later by The Washington Post revealed that a majority of District residents, 54 percent, believed that Gray should resign.

On March 10, 2014, United States Attorney Ronald Machen alleged at a court hearing that Gray knew about businessman Jeffrey E. Thompson's conspiracy to channel more than $660,000 in illegal donations into the campaign. He asserted that Gray and the businessman devised a plan in which Gray would refer to Thompson as "Uncle Earl" to conceal his identity.

At one point, prosecutors initially alleged, Gray gave Thompson a one-page, $425,000 budget request that the businessman then funded. They further alleged that after the election, Thompson gave a $10,000 check to Gray's "close family member" to settle debts with campaign workers. At Gray's request, Thompson allegedly gave $10,000 to fund an unnamed union election campaign and $40,000 to a "close personal friend" in part to finance home improvements.

In December 2015, prosecutors dropped the investigation into Gray's campaign citing lack of evidence. Asked about the prosecutor's decision, Bowser was quoted as saying, "I think it was appropriate to ask questions about the fairness of the 2010 mayoral campaign. The U.S. Attorney secured seven convictions related to that campaign. He says it's over, and I think like most Washingtonians, I am looking forward to moving forward".

In April 2016, the Washington Post secured the release of previously sealed documents regarding Gray's investigation. It was revealed that prosecutors did not bring charges against Gray because they were concerned about the reliability of Thompson as a witness. Thompson has multiple relationships with men, including some who may have been underage, and prosecutors feared that if he had paid money to conceal this fact that a jury would not find him credible.

=== 2014 mayoral campaign ===
On December 2, 2013, Gray filed papers to run for reelection and announced his reelection campaign in a letter to supporters. On April 1, 2014, Gray was defeated in the Democratic primary by D.C. council member Muriel Bowser. His loss was attributed largely to the ongoing investigation into his 2010 campaign finances.

== Second Council tenure ==
In February 2016, Gray announced he was running to represent Ward 7 on the Council. Gray said he was running because accomplishments in Ward 7 were slowed or stalling, in particular the need to expand access to affordable, high-quality healthcare and build a new hospital to serve residents on the East End of the city. Incumbent Councilmember Yvette Alexander said Gray was running for the seat just to set up for a mayoral candidacy in 2018. On June 14, Gray defeated Alexander, his former protege, in the Democratic primary. Gray was sworn into office for a four-year term on January 2, 2017.

Gray successfully ran for re-election in 2020. In December 2021, Gray suffered a stroke, but returned to the Council in January 2022. In December 2023, Gray announced that he would not seek a third term. In October 2024, Gray announced that he had been diagnosed with early-stage dementia and would not participate in council votes for the rest of the term.

== Electoral history ==
2004 Council of the District of Columbia, Ward 7, Democratic Primary Election
Party	Candidate	Votes	%
Democratic	Vincent Gray	5,342	50
Democratic	Kevin P. Chavous	3,631	34
Democratic	Mia Hairston-Hamiliton	1,086	10
Democratic	Mary J. Jackson	463	4
Democratic	Donna E. Daniels	76	1
Democratic	James (JJ-Jimmy) Johnson	67	1
	Write-in	18	0

2004 Council of the District of Columbia, Ward 7, General Election
Party	Candidate	Votes	%
Democratic	Vincent Gray	24,206	91
DC Statehood Green	Michele Tingling-Clemmons	1,198	5
	Write-in	571	2
Republican	Jerod Tolson	491	2

2006 Chairman of the Council of the District of Columbia, Democratic Primary Election
Party	Candidate	Votes	%
Democratic	Vincent Gray	58,345	57
Democratic	Kathy Patterson	43,646	42.68
Democratic	Write-in	261	0

2006 Chairman of the Council of the District of Columbia, General Election
Party	Candidate	Votes	%
Democratic	Vincent Gray	107,249	97
	Write-in	3,051	3

2010 Mayor of the District of Columbia, Democratic Primary Election
Party	Candidate	Votes	%
Democratic	Vincent C. Gray	72,648	54
Democratic	Adrian Fenty	59,524	44
Democratic	Leo Alexander	908	1
Democratic	Ernest E. Johnson	317	0
Democratic	Write-in candidate	248	0
Democratic	Sulaimon Brown	209	0

2010 Mayor of the District of Columbia, General Election
Party	Candidate	Votes	%
Democratic	Vincent Gray	97,978	74
	Write-in	29,599	22
Independent	Carlos Allen	2,279	2
DC Statehood Green	Faith	1,476	1
Socialist	Omar Musi	717	1

2014 Mayor of the District of Columbia, Democratic Party primary election
Party	Candidate	Votes	%
Democratic	Muriel E. Bowser	42,045	43
Democratic	Vincent C. Gray	31,613	33
Democratic	Tommy Wells	12,393	13
Democratic	Jack Evans	4,877	5
Democratic	Andy Shallal	3,196	3
Democratic	Vincent Orange	1,946	2
Democratic	Reta Lewis	490	1
Democratic	Carlos Allen	120	0
	write-in	235	0

2016 Council of the District of Columbia, Ward 7, general election
Party	Candidate	Votes	%
Democratic	Vincent C. Gray	27,956	86
Independent	Gary Butler	2,367	7
Independent	Christian Carter	1,837	6
	write-in	237	1

2020 Council of the District of Columbia, Ward 7, Democratic Party primary election
Party	Candidate	Votes	%
Democratic	Vincent C. Gray	5,254	45
Democratic	Veda Rasheed	2,638	23
Democratic	Kelvin Brown	2,024	18
Democratic	Anthony Lorenzo Green	1,396	12
Democratic	Rebecca J. Morris	183	2
Democratic	James Leroy Jennings	36	0
	write-in	34	0

== Personal life ==
Gray has two children, Jonice Gray, and Vincent Carlos Gray, and two grandchildren, Austin Gray Tucker and Jillian Gray Tucker. In 2012, it was revealed that Gray had passed dozens of Verizon Center tickets to his children. The Sky Suite tickets were freely provided to the Mayor's office, while Gray defended his children as "ambassadors" of the District; the widower’s daughter was designated First Lady of the city.

Gray's first wife Loretta died in July 1998 of cancer. In 2018, he announced his marriage to longtime partner Dawn Kum. Gray lives in the Hillcrest neighborhood of Ward 7. He is Catholic.

=== Health ===
Since 2021, Gray has suffered multiple strokes, and he was subsequently diagnosed with dementia. In 2024, his children filed a petition asking for a conservatorship to manage his affairs, alleging that he had experienced a total of four strokes and accusing his second wife, Dawn Kum, of not devoting adequate resource to his care. Gray's spokesman, Chuck Thies, disputed this, saying that he had had two strokes instead of four, and that he had been receiving sufficient care. Gray was later placed under a conservatorship.

Political offices
Preceded by Linda Cropp	Chair of the Council of the District of Columbia; 2007–2011	Succeeded by Kwame Brown
Preceded by Adrian Fenty	Mayor of the District of Columbia; 2011–2015	Succeeded by Muriel Bowser
Party political offices
Preceded by Adrian Fenty	Democratic nominee for Mayor of the District of Columbia; 2010	Succeeded by Muriel Bowser
