= Sharon Pratt =

Mayor of the District of Columbia from 1991 to 1995

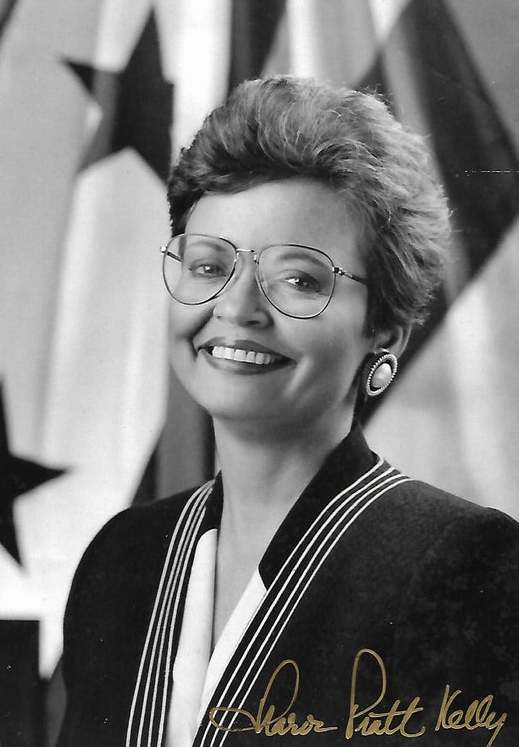

3rd Mayor of the District of Columbia
- In office January 2, 1991 – January 2, 1995
- Preceded by: Marion Barry
- Succeeded by: Marion Barry

Treasurer of the Democratic National Committee
- In office February 1, 1985 – February 10, 1989
- Preceded by: Paul Kirk
- Succeeded by: Robert Farmer

Personal details
- Born: January 30, 1944 (age 82) Washington, D.C., U.S.
- Party: Democratic
- Spouse(s): Arrington Dixon (m. 1967–1982) James Kelly (m. 1991–1999)
- Children: 2
- Education: Howard University (BA, JD)
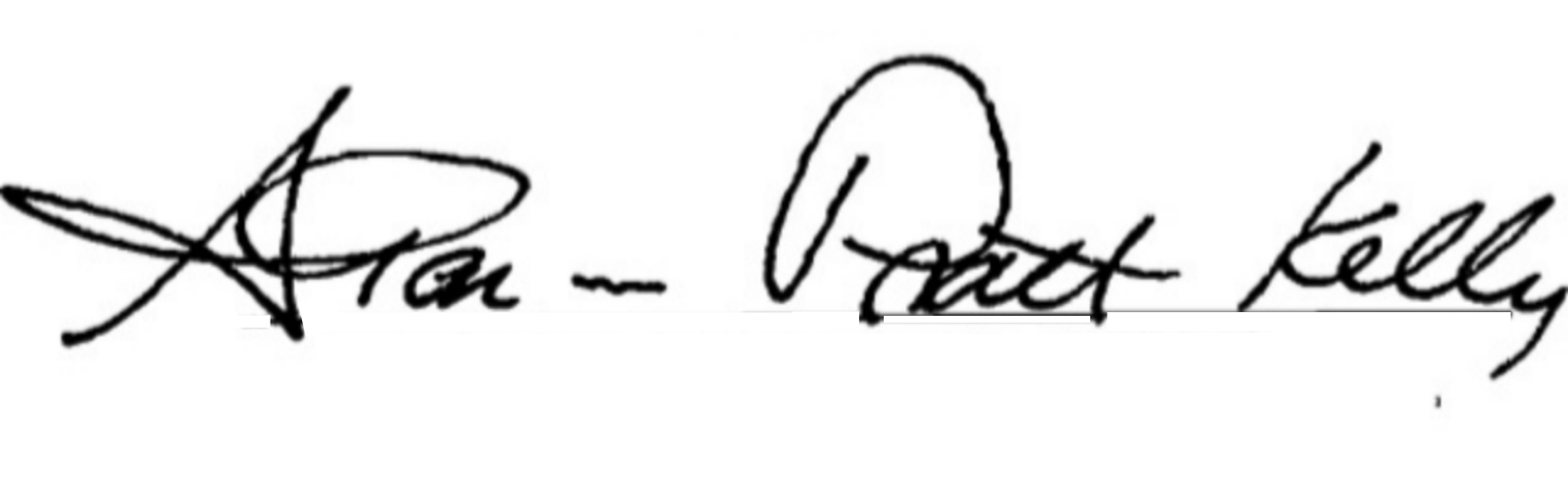
- Signature
- Website: Official website

Sharon Pratt (born January 30, 1944), formerly Sharon Pratt Dixon and Sharon Pratt Kelly, is an American attorney and politician who was the mayor of the District of Columbia from 1991 to 1995, the first mayor born in the District of Columbia since Richard Wallach who took office in 1861 and the first woman in that position.

== Personal life ==
Sharon Pratt was born to D.C. Superior Court judge Carlisle Edward Pratt and Mildred "Peggy" (Petticord) Pratt. After her mother died of breast cancer, her grandmother, Hazel Pratt, and aunt, Aimee Elizabeth Pratt, helped to raise Sharon and her younger sister.

Pratt attended D.C. Public Schools Gage ES, Rudolph ES, MacFarland Junior High School, and Roosevelt HS (1961, with honors). She excelled at baseball but did not pursue the sport in adolescence. At Howard University she joined the Alpha Kappa Alpha sorority (1964), and earned a B.A. in political science (1965). She received a J.D. degree from the Howard University School of Law in 1968. She married Arrington Dixon in 1966 and has two daughters with him; they divorced after sixteen years.

She campaigned and was elected and inaugurated mayor of DC as Sharon Pratt Dixon, but when she married James R. Kelly III, a New York businessman, on December 7, 1991, she changed her name to Sharon Pratt Kelly. After their 1999 divorce, she resumed her maiden name, Sharon Pratt.

Pratt is a member of The Links.

== Career ==
Initially her political energies were drawn to national rather than local politics. She was a member of the Democratic National Committee from the District of Columbia (1977–1990), the first woman to hold that position. She was DNC Treasurer from 1985 to 1989.

At the 1980 Democratic National Convention, she was a member of the Ad Hoc Credentials Committee, member of the Judicial Council, and co-chairman of the Rules Committee. In 1982, she ran Patricia Roberts Harris' mayoral campaign in the D.C. election.

In 1983, she was made Vice President of Community Relations at Pepco, the D.C. electric utility. She became the first woman and first African American to serve in that role. The same year, she won the Presidential Award from the National Association for the Advancement of Colored People (NAACP).

=== 1990 mayoral election ===
Upset with the decline of her hometown, Pratt announced at the 1988 Democratic National Convention that she would challenge incumbent mayor Marion Barry in the 1990 election. Pratt was the only candidate to have officially announced her plans to run for mayor when Barry was arrested on drug charges and dropped out of the race in early 1990. Shortly thereafter, the race was joined by longtime councilmembers John Ray, Charlene Drew Jarvis and David Clarke. Pratt criticized her three main opponents, referring to them as the "three blind mice" who "saw nothing, said nothing and did nothing as the city rapidly decayed." She was the only candidate who called on Barry to resign from office, and ran specifically as an outsider to his political machine.

Following a series of televised debates during the last few weeks of the campaign, Pratt received the endorsement of The Washington Post. The day the endorsement appeared, her poll numbers skyrocketed, with many political observers attributing the rise specifically to the Post's backing. On the eve of the election, polls showed Councilmember John Ray holding the lead, but Pratt gaining ground fast and a large margin of undecided voters remaining. However, even with the smallest campaign staff and least money, Pratt won the election, defeating second-place Ray by 10%. As Washington is a heavily Democratic city, her victory over the Republican candidate, former police chief Maurice T. Turner Jr., in the November 6 general election was a foregone conclusion. She was sworn in as mayor of Washington on January 2, 1991.

== Mayor of the District of Columbia ==
Once in office, Pratt's grassroots, reform posture met resistance. She made good on her promises to clean house, requesting the resignations of all Barry appointees the day after her election; however, as she began to slash the city employment payroll, her political support began to weaken. She angered labor leaders who claimed she had promised not to fire union employees, and began mandating unpaid furloughs and wage freezes citywide. She took great pains to remove all of Barry's political cronies, even though these layoffs hurt her administration as well. Kelly faced criticism due to accusations of being elitist, thus distancing her from poor and working-class blacks in the city. Kelly was at odds with several D.C. Council members with her proposal to temporarily move the city government to the building at One Judiciary Square, ten blocks away from Washington's incumbent city hall, the District Building, while the latter underwent renovations. When Kelly moved her office and administration departments to One Judiciary Square in 1992, the Council refused to leave the District Building, although they had approved the proposal that spring. In February 1993, after accusing Kelly of deliberately neglecting maintenance in order to force them out, they voted to take full and exclusive control of the District Building.

According to the Washington City Paper, Kelly "was never able to get control of a city government still loyal to Barry, and she often mistrusted the advice she got from aides." In the spring of 1992, just over a year into her term, Barry loyalists mounted a recall campaign, which, although unsuccessful, weakened her administration and forced Kelly to tread more carefully with the public, backing away from her reform efforts.

=== Statehood ===
Kelly's drive to achieve D.C. statehood in order to improve the District's financial and political standing created fierce opposition from Republican members of Congress, who unleashed a barrage of attacks on the District as a "national disgrace" of "one-party rule...massive dependency, hellish crime...and unrelenting scandal." The attacks brought unwelcome negative press to the District, and the ultimate failure in the House of Representatives of DC statehood legislation weakened her political capital. She lost standing with the D.C. Council when she supported Council member Linda Cropp to serve as acting chair after the suicide of John A. Wilson in May 1993; instead, the Council chose John L. Ray.

=== Redskins stadium ===
Kelly was blamed for the Washington Redskins moving out of the city. Redskins owner Jack Kent Cooke attempted to pressure the city to build a new stadium to replace aging RFK Stadium, with the threat of moving the team to nearby Alexandria, Virginia. After negotiations stalled and Cooke was publicly courted by Virginia's governor, Kelly denounced Cooke vocally, saying that "I will not allow our good community to be steamrolled by a billionaire bully." She announced that she had offered as much as she was willing to offer the Redskins and would go no further. Although an agreement was ultimately reached, in 1993 Cooke withdrew from negotiations and moved the team to what is now Northwest Stadium (originally Jack Kent Cooke Stadium; later FedEx Field) in Landover, Maryland.

=== City finances and re-election campaign ===
Kelly began her term having extremely good relations with Congress, including successfully lobbying them to increase federal aid for D.C. by $100 million and to authorize the sale of $300 million in deficit reduction bonds. As fiscal year 1994 began for DC government (in October 1993), DC faced a $500 million budget deficit, with financial experts predicting that the city's debt would reach $1 billion by 1999; the US Congress commissioned a federal audit of the city finances by the GAO.

In February 1994, in the face of a ballooning deficit, Kelly faced heavy criticism when The Washington Post reported that she regularly spent taxpayer funds on makeup for cable television appearances. Kelly was reported to have set aside $14,000 of city money to pay her makeup artist. In the weeks following, Kelly came under fire for other inappropriate uses of city funds, including the addition of bulletproof glass and a marble fireplace in her office and a series of 1993 televised town hall meetings that she had promised would be paid for with private financing.

The GAO's report on DC finances was published on June 22, 1994, and estimated that the city would run out of money in two years and "may be forced to borrow from the U.S. Treasury by fiscal year 1995." The report specifically singled out Kelly's administration for gross mismanagement of city funds and agencies, and accused her of concealing the city's perilous fiscal condition from Congress for two years, "using gimmicks and violating the federal anti-deficiency act, which prohibits over-spending of a federally approved budget." The report, coupled with Congress' subsequent assertion of power over DC's budget (including deep cuts and new requirements for mayoral compliance), provided political ammunition for her challengers and effectively destroyed Kelly's reelection campaign.

The Washington Post, which had endorsed Kelly in 1990, instead in 1994 endorsed Councilman John Ray. In its endorsement, the Post reflected that Kelly "has not been a coalition builder, which a mayor – and perhaps particularly the mayor of a city under enormous financial and social stress – needs to be...the most aggressive members of the city council, those most sympathetic to her cost-cutting message, are not with her. Nor are key elements in the business community. She has lost them and with them, we believe, her chance to enact the measures she has stood for."

In the Democratic primary that September, Kelly finished a distant third, with only about 13% of the vote. Barry won the primary and would go on to win the general election in November against an unusually strong Republican opponent, Carol Schwartz.

== Post-mayoral activities ==
=== Consulting ===
In 2003, Pratt was awarded a $235,000 contract from the District of Columbia's Department of Health to be the city's main contact with federal homeland security agencies. The contract also calls for her to investigate improved communications and technology to protect the district from bioterrorism. Pratt was required to meet with senior federal officials and write a report on potential opportunities, especially resource-sharing agreements. She was also required to look for additional funding sources. Pratt's firm, Pratt Consulting, does management consulting and works with federal, state, and local agencies and non-profit groups.

== Awards ==
- Glamour magazine's Woman of the Year Award
- Congressional Black Caucus' Mary McLeod Bethune–W. E. B. Du Bois Award
- Clean Cities Award, 1993
- Candace Award, National Coalition of 100 Black Women, 1991

== See also ==
- List of female governors in the United States

Party political offices
Preceded by Marion Barry	Democratic nominee for Mayor of the District of Columbia; 1990	Succeeded by Marion Barry
Political offices
Preceded by Marion Barry	Mayor of the District of Columbia; 1991–1995	Succeeded by Marion Barry
