= Arrington Dixon =

American politician (born 1942)

Member of the Council of the District of Columbia from the at-large district
- In office August 16, 1997 – December 15, 1997
- Preceded by: Linda Cropp
- Succeeded by: David Catania

2nd Chair of the Council of the District of Columbia
- In office January 2, 1979 – January 2, 1983
- Preceded by: Sterling Tucker
- Succeeded by: David A. Clarke

Member of the Council of the District of Columbia from Ward 4
- In office January 2, 1975 – January 2, 1979
- Preceded by: Position established
- Succeeded by: Charlene Drew Jarvis

Personal details
- Born: Arrington Liggins Dixon; December 3, 1942 (age 83) Washington, D.C., U.S.
- Party: Democratic
- Spouse: Sharon Pratt (m. 1966; div. 1982)
- Children: 2
- Education: Howard University (BA); George Washington University (JD)

Arrington Liggins Dixon (born December 3, 1942) is an American politician who is a former chair and member of the Council of the District of Columbia of Washington, D.C.

== Early years ==
Dixon was born on December 3, 1942, in Anacostia in Washington, D.C., to James and Sally Dixon.

== Council of the District of Columbia ==
=== 1975–1979 ===
In November 1974, Dixon was chosen to represent Ward 4 when voters elected the first members of the Council of the District of Columbia, the legislature of the city's new home rule government. The initial term for the Ward 4 seat, like those for half the council seats, was only 2 years, to provide for staggered council elections in later years, but in 1976 Dixon was reelected to a full four-year term.

=== 1979–1983 ===
In 1978, council chairman Sterling Tucker ran for mayor rather than seeking reelection. Dixon, who was halfway through his Ward 4 term, decided to run for Chair of the Council and won. He served 4 years. In 1982, Dixon ran for re-election, but he was defeated in the Democratic primary by David A. Clarke.

Dixon was later appointed by Mayor Marion Barry to serve as a public member of the National Capital Planning Commission.

=== 1997 ===
More than a decade later, Dixon returned to the council as an at-large member for a few months in 1997 when he was chosen in August by the District of Columbia Democratic State Committee to replace Linda Cropp, who had vacated her at-large seat to become chairman. The appointment lasted only until a December special election, in which he was defeated by then-Republican David Catania. Catania was sworn in on December 15, 1997.

== Personal life ==
In 1966, he married Sharon Pratt Kelly, and they had daughters Aimee and Drew. His daughters were born in 1968 and 1970. The couple divorced in 1982 after sixteen years of marriage.

Political offices
Preceded by Sterling Tucker	Chair of the Council of the District of Columbia; 1979–1983	Succeeded by David A. Clarke
