= Jack Evans (Washington, D.C., politician) =

Washington, D.C. politician

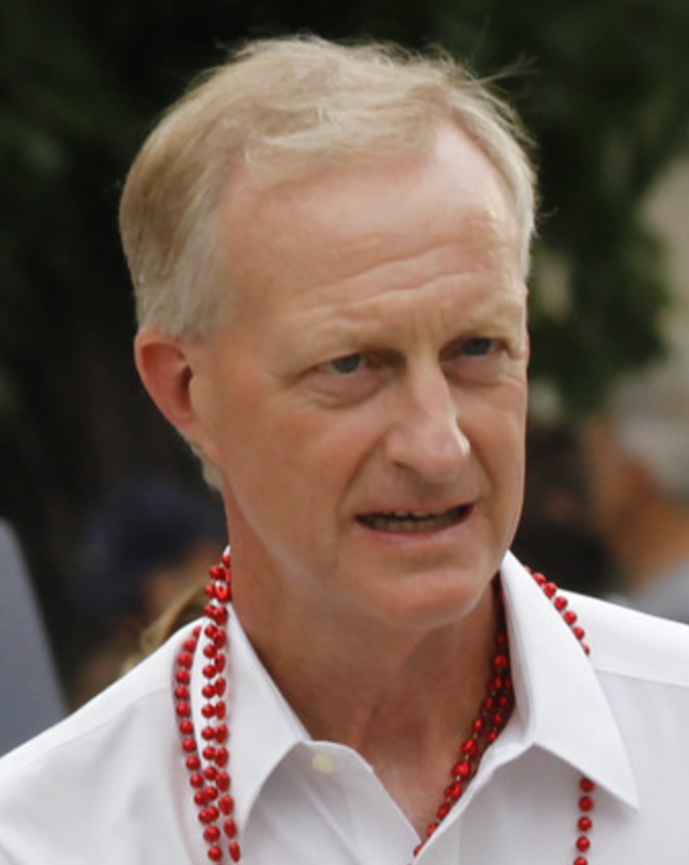
- Evans in 2011

Chair pro tempore of the Council of the District of Columbia
- In office January 2, 2001 – January 2, 2011
- Preceded by: Charlene Drew Jarvis
- Succeeded by: Mary Cheh

Member of the Council of the District of Columbia from Ward 2
- In office May 13, 1991 – January 17, 2020
- Preceded by: John Wilson
- Succeeded by: Brooke Pinto

Personal details
- Born: October 31, 1953 (age 72) Nanticoke, Pennsylvania, U.S.
- Party: Democratic
- Spouses: Noel Soderberg (m. 1994; died 2003); Michele Seiver (m. 2010; sep. 2014)
- Children: 3
- Education: University of Pennsylvania (BS); University of Pittsburgh (JD)

John K. Evans III (born October 31, 1953) is an American lawyer and politician who served on the Council of the District of Columbia from 1991 to 2020 before resigning due to numerous ethics violations. Evans served as the chairman of the board of the Washington Metropolitan Area Transit Authority (WMATA) until its ethics committee found he violated conflict of interest rules. A member of the Democratic Party, he represented Ward 2 of Washington, D.C. from May 1991 to January 2020, making him the D.C. Council's longest-serving lawmaker. He ran for mayor in 1998 and 2014, but lost in the Democratic primary both times.

== Early life and education ==
John K. Evans III was born in Nanticoke, Pennsylvania, the son of a florist and a school teacher. He received an economics degree with honors (cum laude) from the Wharton School of the University of Pennsylvania in 1975, and a J.D. degree from the University of Pittsburgh School of Law in 1978. He began practicing law in Washington, D.C. at the Securities and Exchange Commission in the Division of Enforcement.

== Career ==
Evans was elected to the D.C. Council in 1991 in a special election to replace John A. Wilson, who had run for council chairman and won. He was sworn in on May 13, 1991. He had previously served as a member of Advisory Neighborhood Commission 2B in Dupont Circle. Evans was elected to serve as chairman of the ANC from 1989 to 1990. He was the Councilmember for Ward 2 from 1991 to 2020, which included Chinatown, Logan Circle, Dupont Circle, Sheridan-Kalorama, Foggy Bottom, the West End, Georgetown, Burleith, Hillandale, and much of Downtown Washington (including the White House, the National Mall, and the U.S. Capitol Building).

On the D.C. Council, Evans served as chairman of the council's Committee on Finance and Revenue until 2019 when he was removed following ethics investigations. During his time on the council, Evans authored D.C.'s Earned Income Tax Credit (EITC) legislation.

Evans was a delegate at every Democratic National Convention from 1992 to 2016, as well as D.C. co-chair of the 2004 Howard Dean presidential campaign, the 1992 and 1996 Bill Clinton presidential campaigns, the 2012 Barack Obama presidential campaign and the 2008 and 2016 Hillary Clinton presidential campaigns. He was a Presidential Elector for the District of Columbia in 1992, 2004, and 2016. He also served as D.C. Democratic Party treasurer from 1988 to 1991, board chairman for the Metropolitan Washington Council of Governments in 1995, and was elected Democratic National Committeeman for the District on the Democratic National Committee in 2018.

Evans first ran for mayor in 1998, coming in third behind Anthony A. Williams and fellow Councilmember Kevin P. Chavous. Evans launched his second campaign for mayor on June 8, 2013. By December 10, his campaign had raised over $1,000,000, making him the top fundraising candidate and the first to break the million-dollar mark. On January 27, the campaign had turned in more than 10,000 petition signatures, the largest collection of signatures by a mayoral candidate in the 2014 race. Evans finished in fourth place with 4,039 votes.

In January 2024, Evans was appointed by councilman Phil Mendelson to the DC Commission on the Arts and Humanities to fill a vacancy left by Muriel Bowser for a period of five months.

In March 2025, Evans began working for DC's Department of Housing and Community Development (DHCD) as an economic development program specialist.

Evans announced his intention to challenge D.C. Council Chair Phil Mendelson in the 2026 Council of the District of Columbia election on January 27, 2026. Facing a challenge over the number of signatures he collected, Evans withdrew his candidacy.

=== Ethics investigations and criticism ===
Evans has faced multiple ethics investigations, including using his position on the WMATA Board of Directors for personal gain. Other investigations found Evans took payments from EagleBank, Colonial Parking, Wilco Construction, Exelon, and other companies with business before the D.C. Council and WMATA. A federal grand jury investigation of Evans' business relationships included an FBI raid of Evans' residence in June 2019. In August 2019, the D.C. Board of Ethics and Government Accountability (BEGA) found that there was "substantial evidence" that Evans violated rules restricting officials from using their offices for private gains. The ethics board fined him $20,000. At the conclusion of the investigation he received an additional fine in May 2020 for $35,000, the largest ever levied by the agency, for violating the council's code of conduct regarding conflicts of interest. In 2022, a spokesperson for the DC Office of Attorney General said that Evans had paid off the $55,000 he owed in fines ahead of schedule. The US Attorney's office announced later that year that the federal investigation had concluded with no criminal charges.

Evans was widely criticized for advocating for legislation that awarded a $215 million five-year monopoly on mobile-based sports wagers to lottery operator Intralot in 2019, without disclosing his business or long-term personal relationship with Intralot lobbyist William "Bill" Jarvis. On January 14, 2025, Attorney General Brian Schwalb announced that Intralot, and its subcontractor, Veterans Services Corporation (VSC), would pay restitution totaling $6.5 million for its fraudulent operation of a type of shell game meant to deceive city officials into awarding the 2019 contract.

After reviewing the findings of a Council-funded investigation, all twelve other Councilmembers recommended his expulsion in December 2019. Before a final expulsion vote could be held, he announced his resignation.

Ten days after leaving his seat on January 17, 2020, he filed paperwork to run in the special election to replace him as well as in the primary for the next regular election, a move condemned by all of his former council colleagues. Evans finished seventh in the Democratic Primary, garnering 3.8% of the vote.

Evans has been criticized for using his constituent service funds to purchase tickets to sporting events. The Washington Post calculated that Evans had spent $135,897 on sporting events and directed $101,564 toward charitable organizations over the previous decade. Evans explained that, as a major advocate of local sports, he used funds for the benefit of Little League Baseball teams and other constituents that cannot afford to attend sports events. In 2015, Evans used his constituent services fund to reimburse himself for a $50 parking ticket. In 2016, the Council approved a $20,000 increase to the funding limits of constituent services funds at Evans' request.

=== Other employment ===
During his time on the D.C. Council, Evans' outside employment includes work as an insurance executive for Central Benefits Mutual Insurance Co., as an of counsel attorney at the Squire Patton Boggs law firm from 2001 until 2015, and earlier as a partner with the firm BakerHostetler. In October 2015, Evans became Counsel to the law firm of Manatt, Phelps & Phillips. He resigned from the firm in November 2017.

In 2016, Evans formed a company called NSE Consulting, using a prominent lobbyist as the firm's registered agent. Among the clients of NSE Consulting were development and investment firms Willco and EastBanc and the parent company of Colonial Parking, all of whom stood to benefit from legislation Evans introduced. Facing federal scrutiny and calls for his resignation, Evans announced he would no longer pursue outside income and outside consulting. In March 2019, he renewed the business registration for NSE Consulting, claiming he was following advice of counsel.

In 2018, the D.C. Board of Ethics and Government Accountability opened an investigation into Evans's dealings with digital sign company Digi Media, to determine whether Evans had violated the council's code of conduct by lobbying on the company's behalf. Evans denies violating ethics rules. In December 2018, the ethics board suspended the inquiry because of an ongoing law enforcement investigation. In September 2018, a federal grand jury issued a subpoena for documents relating to the matter. In March 2019, the investigation was expanded to include Evans' relationship with several large D.C. businesses and lobbying firms.

Evans was reprimanded by a unanimous council motion in March 2019 for using his D.C. Council staff and email to solicit business from law firms that lobby the city. Resisting calls to remove him from Chair of the Finance and Revenue Committee, Mendelson stripped him of oversight of Events DC and the DC Commission on the Arts and Humanities. Evans apologized and claimed that he had stopped outside consulting. Following further revelations that Evans had violated ethics rules during his time as Chairman of WMATA, the council removed him from Committee leadership and reached a split vote about whether to remove him from all committee assignments.

As revelations about Evans' outside employment grew, calls for his resignation from the D.C. Council followed. In May 2019, a recall campaign was launched by local activist Adam Eidinger. Other activists launched a website titled "Sack Jack" calling for his resignation and detailing the ethics charges. In July 2019, David Grosso was the first member of the D.C. Council to call for Evans' resignation. The council commissioned a report by a D.C. law firm, which found multiple instances when Evans took official actions which benefited his clients, none of which were disclosed. House Republicans sought to delay markup of House Resolution 51, which provides Statehood for the District of Columbia, due to concerns over Evans' ethics. Evans said that Republicans were citing his behavior because they lacked any valid reasons to oppose Statehood. On December 3, 2019, all of his council colleagues voted to recommend his expulsion, the first time that step had been taken.

=== Political positions ===
Evans supports gay rights. According to the Washington Blade, "Evans has been the lead sponsor or co-sponsor of virtually every LGBT-supportive bill that has come before the legislative body." In 2009, Evans co-sponsored the bill that legalized same-sex marriage in D.C. The nation's capital became the first jurisdiction in the United States south of the Mason–Dixon line to allow same-sex couples to marry.

Evans supported the construction of the Verizon Center, which opened in 1997 in his ward and became home to the Washington Wizards, Washington Mystics, and Washington Capitals as they moved from suburban Maryland to Downtown Washington. He played a key role in the negotiations that brought the Montreal Expos franchise to Washington, D.C., in 2005, and in the council's 2004 decision to finance a stadium for the Washington Nationals. In 2016, Evans stated that he opposed proposed legislation that would impose a cap on public funding for a new Wizards practice facility.

In 2001, Evans introduced successful legislation to overturn a 1994 referendum that had limited members of the D.C. Council to two terms. Evans argued that by denying voters their choice of candidates, term limits were undemocratic.

Evans has several times introduced legislation to ban Council involvement in the contract procurement process, a practice which Evans has described as "a recipe for mischief," and which the Washington Post said in 2015, "practically invites losing bidders and their lobbyists to attempt an end run."

In July 2012, Evans sponsored legislation to delay the direct election of D.C.'s attorney general. Voters had previously approved a charter amendment making the post an elected, rather than appointed, position. Evans expressed concern that the city was not ready for the scheduled 2014 vote, noting among other things that no candidates had emerged for the position. In June 2014, a federal appeals court invalidated the legislation and ordered that the vote take place as scheduled.

In 2013, Evans co-sponsored introduced emergency measures to keep application-based services like Uber, Lyft, and Sidecar street legal.

Evans favors the return of the Washington Football Team to the District of Columbia, and has said that neither the personality of the team's owner, Daniel Snyder, nor the previous controversy over the team's name should be relevant to that effort. As he explained, "whatever it's called, whoever owns it is not relevant, because that will change over time."

In 2016, the D.C. Council considered legislation that would provide paid family and medical leave to employees in the District of Columbia and fund the benefits by new taxes on all District businesses. Evans opposed the new tax, calling the proposed legislation an "absurdity" because most of the benefits would be received by residents of neighboring Maryland and Virginia, not those of the District, whose businesses would be taxed. As an alternative, Evans co-introduced legislation which would have afforded the same paid leave, but in lieu of a tax, would have required private employers to pay employees for the time off. Although supported by the mayor and major business groups, the alternative failed, and the original proposal passed the council by a vote of 9–4.

=== Washington Metropolitan Area Transit Authority ===
Evans has twice served as the primary director from the District of the Columbia on the Washington Metropolitan Area Transit Authority (WMATA), first from 1993 to 1999 and again from 2015 through June 2019. He served as chairman of the board three times (1994, 1997, and 2016). In 2016, Evans advocated reform of the agency and additional funding from the federal government. In November 2016, Evans urged that Metro's challenges should be addressed by a federal takeover, in an arrangement akin to the control board that rescued the District from financial crisis in the 1990s. In 2016, Evans stated that Metro's 16-member board was cumbersome and unworkable. Evans also cautioned that establishment of a control board would face major legal and political challenges, and acknowledged that the proposal was unlikely to win much backing. He sought the investigation of Laz Parking, a WMATA contractor and competitor of Colonial Parking, a NSE consulting client that was paying him $50,000 a year. While serving as Chairman of WMATA, he simultaneously was hired by 10 firms that had business with WMATA, receiving a total undisclosed payment of $325,000 annually.

In May 2019, Evans said he would not serve another term as Chairman of WMATA. Evans initially claimed that he decided not to seek reelection as chairman voluntarily. Following the disclosure of a 20-page memo that identified 16 different ways in which Evans violated either the board's ethics code or the Metro Compact, the founding charter of WMATA, Evans said he had a poor recollection of the events and was focused on how he could update his disclosures. Maryland governor Larry Hogan said that he was too ethically compromised and repeatedly called for him to step down from the board entirely. In a June 2019 letter, Evans said that he would no longer serve on Metro's board following the completion of his term as chairman.

It was also revealed that Evans attempted to pressure Metro General Counsel Patricia Lee and board corporate secretary Jennifer Green Ellison in order to conceal the ethics violation.

== Committees ==
Evans served on the following committees at the time of his resignation:

- Committee on Business and Economic Development
- Committee on Government Operations
- Committee on Transportation and the Environment

== Personal life ==
Evans married Noel Soderberg in 1994. The couple had three children together, triplets. Soderberg died in September 2003 after a long battle with breast cancer. Evans married Michele Seiver in 2010. They split in 2014 and ultimately divorced. Evans is a member of the Christ Church in Georgetown and the Foundry United Methodist Church in Dupont Circle, for which he served as chair of the annual AIDS fundraiser from 2001 to 2003.

Evans has been frequently criticized in the media and by the public for violating city parking regulations with his personal vehicle. In 2014, he issued a statement apologizing for extended parking in front of a fire hydrant, and in 2018, he was filmed telling a bystander "if I park illegally, that opens up a spot for you" while also accusing the bystander of harassment and threatening to "call somebody" to address the situation.

== Election history ==
1991 Council of the District of Columbia, Ward 2, Special Election
Party	Candidate	Votes	%
Democratic	Jack Evans		31
Democratic	Jim Zais		27
Democratic	Bill Cochran		11
Democratic	Clarene Martin		11
	Other		18
	Write-in		2

1992 Council of the District of Columbia, Ward 2, Democratic Primary Election
Party	Candidate	Votes	%
Democratic	Jack Evans		95
	Write-in		5

1992 Council of the District of Columbia, Ward 2, General Election
Party	Candidate	Votes	%
Democratic	Jack Evans		79
Republican	Herbert Coles		13
Republican	Nathaniel Adams		7
	Write-in		1

1996 Council of the District of Columbia, Ward 2, Democratic Primary Election
Party	Candidate	Votes	%
Democratic	Jack Evans		78
Democratic	James McLeod		21
	Write-in		1

1996 Council of the District of Columbia, Ward 2, General Election
Party	Candidate	Votes	%
Democratic	Jack Evans		79
Republican	Roger L. Moffatt		21
	Write-in		1

1998 Mayor of the District of Columbia, Democratic Primary Election
Party	Candidate	Votes	%
Democratic	Anthony Williams		50
Democratic	Kevin P. Chavous		35
Democratic	Jack Evans		10
Democratic	Harold Brazil		4
Democratic	Sylvia Robinson-Green		0
Democratic	Jeff Gildenhorn		0
Democratic	Osie Thorpe		0
	Write-in		0

2000 Council of the District of Columbia, Ward 2, Democratic Primary Election
Party	Candidate	Votes	%
Democratic	Jack Evans		66
Democratic	John Fanning		18
Democratic	Pete Ross		15
Democratic	Ray Avrutis		1
	Write-in		1

2000 Council of the District of Columbia, Ward 2, General Election
Party	Candidate	Votes	%
Democratic	Jack Evans		79
DC Statehood Green	Tom Briggs		21
	Write-in		1

2004 Council of the District of Columbia, Ward 2, Democratic Primary Election
Party	Candidate	Votes	%
Democratic	Jack Evans		96
	Write-in		4

2004 Council of the District of Columbia, Ward 2, General Election
Party	Candidate	Votes	%
Democratic	Jack Evans		82
Republican	Jesse James Price Sr.		9
DC Statehood Green	Jay Houston Marx		8
	Write-in		0

2008 Council of the District of Columbia, Ward 2, Democratic Primary Election
Party	Candidate	Votes	%
Democratic	Jack Evans		65
Democratic	Cary Silverman		35
	Write-in		0

2008 Council of the District of Columbia, Ward 2, General Election
Party	Candidate	Votes	%
Democratic	Jack Evans		82
Republican	Christina Erland Culver		17
	Write-in		1

2012 Council of the District of Columbia, Ward 2, Democratic Primary Election
Party	Candidate	Votes	%
Democratic	Jack Evans	2,947	92
	Write-in	247	8

2012 Council of the District of Columbia, Ward 2, General Election
Party	Candidate	Votes	%
Democratic	Jack Evans	23,414	97
	Write-in	760	3

2014 Mayor of the District of Columbia, Democratic Primary Election
Party	Candidate	Votes	%
Democratic	Muriel Bowser	42,045	43
Democratic	Vincent Gray	31,613	33
Democratic	Tommy Wells	12,393	13
Democratic	Jack Evans	4,877	5
Democratic	Andy Shallal	3,196	3
Democratic	Vincent Orange	1,946	2
	Write-in	235	0

2016 Council of the District of Columbia, Ward 2, Democratic Primary Election
Party	Candidate	Votes	%
Democratic	Jack Evans	7,626	95
	Write-in	370	5

2016 Council of the District of Columbia, Ward 2, General Election
Party	Candidate	Votes	%
Democratic	Jack Evans	27,534	97
	Write-in	975	3

2020 Council of the District of Columbia, Ward 2, Democratic Primary Election
Party	Candidate	Votes	%
Democratic	Brooke Pinto	3,142	28
Democratic	Patrick Kennedy	2,763	25
Democratic	Jordan Grossman	2,385	22
Democratic	Kishan Putta	1,100	10
Democratic	John Fanning	695	6
Democratic	Yilin (Ellen) Zhang	473	4
Democratic	Jack Evans	376	3
Democratic	Daniel Hernandez	129	2
	Write-in	8	0

Council of the District of Columbia
Preceded by Charlene Drew Jarvis	Chair pro tempore of the Council of the District of Columbia; 2001–2011	Succeeded by Mary Cheh
