= Nadine Winter =

American politician (1924–2011)

Chair pro tempore of the Council of the District of Columbia
- In office January 2, 1979 – January 2, 1991
- Preceded by: Willie Hardy
- Succeeded by: John L. Ray

Member of the Council of the District of Columbia from Ward 6
- In office January 2, 1975 – January 2, 1991
- Preceded by: Position established
- Succeeded by: Harold Brazil

Personal details
- Born: Nadine Kinnion Poole; March 3, 1924 New Bern, North Carolina, U.S.
- Died: August 26, 2011 (aged 87) Washington, D.C., U.S.
- Spouse: Reginald Winter
- Children: 2
- Education: Brooklyn College (BA); Federal City College (MA)

Nadine P. Winter (March 3, 1924 – August 26, 2011) was a community activist and a Democratic politician in Washington, D.C.

== Early years ==
Winter was born Nadine Kinnion Poole in New Bern, North Carolina, in 1924. She was one of five children of a brick mason and a high-school dietician. Beginning at an early age, she was a community activist and helped to found Winston-Salem's first girl scout troop for black girls.

== Education and community advocacy ==
After graduating from Atkins High School in Winston-Salem, she attended the Hampton Institute where she received a Bachelor of Arts Degree after transferring to Brooklyn College. During this time, she lived in a multi-ethnic community in Brooklyn, where she founded a store-front community service agency and worked nights to complete her education.

After moving to Washington, D.C., in 1947, Winter graduated from Cortez Peters Business School and later received a Master of Arts degree from Federal City College (now the University of the District of Columbia). Soon, Winter began to fulfill a social action and social services role in the city. She was the founder and an executive director of Hospitality House, Inc., which served numerous underprivileged citizens in the District by providing day care for youth and seniors, as well as a temporary homeless shelter. In addition, she also served as an original organizer of the National Welfare Rights Organization.

== Political career ==
Winter was elected as one of the original members of the Council of the District of Columbia in 1974 when D.C. gained home rule. She represented Ward 6 on the council from 1975 to 1991. Winter was a presidential elector in the 1996 and 2000 presidential elections.

Following a 1989 judicial injunction declaring that city homeless shelters were in violation of the district's Right to Overnight Shelter Act law and were "virtual hell-holes", Winter introduced an amendment limiting shelter use to 10 days every six months, stating "We have done what we can to make them human beings."

== Personal life ==
Winter had two sons. Winter's husband, Reginald C. Winter Sr., died in 1973.

== Death ==
Winter died of pneumonia in her home in Southwest, Washington, D.C., on August 26, 2011.

Council of the District of Columbia
Preceded by Willie Hardy	Chair pro tempore of the Council of the District of Columbia; 1979–1991	Succeeded by John L. Ray
