= John L. Ray =

American lawyer (1943–2025)

John Ray
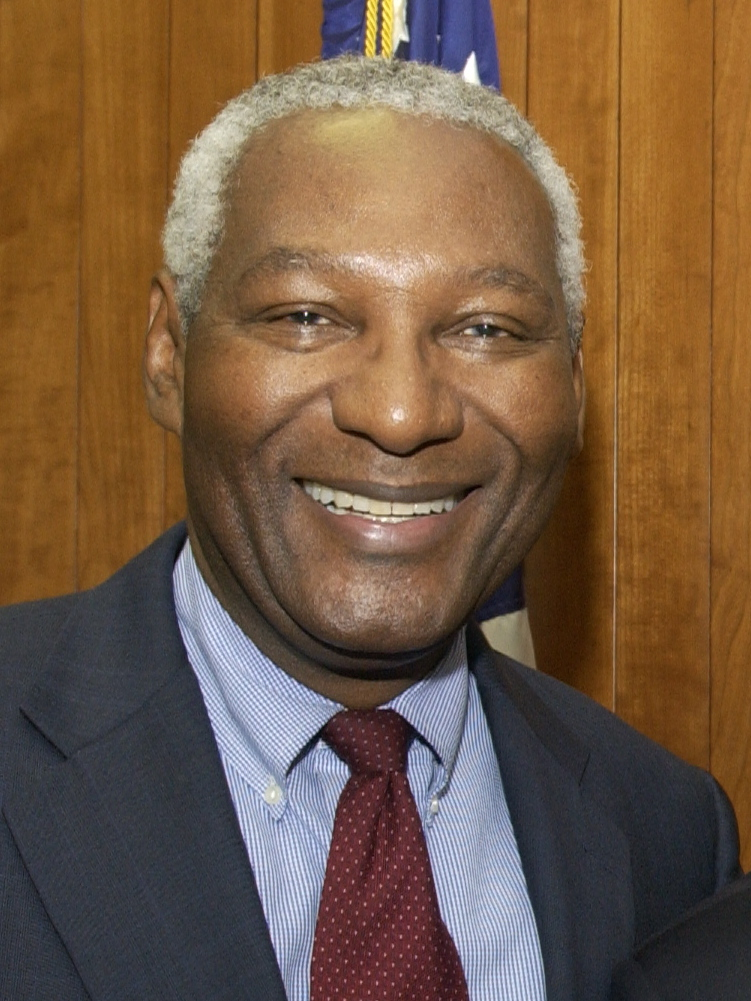
- Ray in 2006

Chair of the Council of the District of Columbia
- Acting
- In office May 19, 1993 – September 14, 1993
- Preceded by: John Wilson
- Succeeded by: David A. Clarke

Chair pro tempore of the Council of the District of Columbia
- In office January 2, 1991 – September 14, 1993
- Preceded by: Nadine Winter
- Succeeded by: Charlene Drew Jarvis

Member of the Council of the District of Columbia from the at-large district
- In office January 8, 1979 – January 2, 1997
- Preceded by: Marion Barry
- Succeeded by: Harold Brazil

Personal details
- Born: John Lamar Ray; May 16, 1943 Toms Creek, Georgia, U.S.
- Died: April 2025 (aged 81)
- Party: Democratic
- Education: George Washington University (BA, JD)

John Lamar Ray (May 16, 1943 – April 2025) was an American lawyer and Democratic politician in Washington, D.C.

Ray was an at-large member of the Council of the District of Columbia from 1979 to 1997. Ray was a partner and member of the board of directors at the law firm Manatt, Phelps & Phillips.

== Early life ==
Ray was born on May 16, 1943 and raised in Toms Creek, Georgia. He graduated from George Washington University School of Law in 1973. While a law school student, Ray interned at Abe Fortas' law firm. After graduating from law school, Ray clerked for D.C. Circuit Judge Spottswood William Robinson III.

== Political career ==
On January 8, 1979, Ray was appointed by the District of Columbia Democratic State Committee to the at-large council seat vacated by Marion Barry, who had been sworn in as mayor a few days earlier. He was Barry's chosen successor. Ray went on to win the May 1 special election handily and then to be reelected in 1980, 1984, 1988, and 1992.

Following Council Chairman John A. Wilson's suicide in May 1993, the council chose Ray to be acting chairman. Mayor Sharon Pratt Kelly had backed another at-large council member, Linda Cropp, for the appointment and thought she had lined up the votes on the council, but Charlene Drew Jarvis switched her vote to Ray because she intended to run for chairman in the special election and viewed Cropp as a threat. Ray served as acting chairman until the special election on September 14, which was won by former chairman David A. Clarke. Ray finished his term as at-large member, but he did not run for reelection in 1996.

== Legal career ==
Ray worked for the United States Department of Justice from 1977 until 1978. By law, councilmembers other than the chairman are allowed to hold other employment. Ray was Of Counsel to the law firm Baker & Hostetler from 1988 to 1994. He joined Manatt, Phelps & Phillips in 1995 and worked there since.

== Death ==
On April 15, 2025, the Council of the District of Columbia announced that Ray had died at the age of 81.

Council of the District of Columbia
Preceded by Nadine Winter	Chair pro tempore of the Council of the District of Columbia; 1991–1993	Succeeded by Charlene Drew Jarvis
Political offices
Preceded by John Wilson	Chair of the Council of the District of Columbia; Acting; 1993	Succeeded by David A. Clarke
