= David A. Clarke =

American politician (1943–1997)

David Clarke
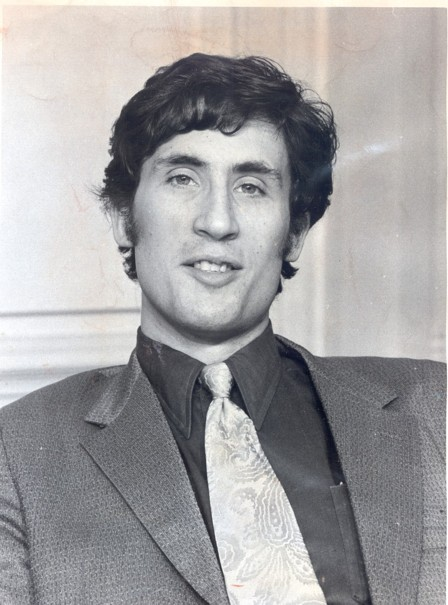
- Clarke in 1975

3rd and 5th Chair of the Council of the District of Columbia
- In office September 14, 1993 – March 27, 1997; On leave: December 30, 1996 – March 27, 1997
- Preceded by: John L. Ray (acting)
- Succeeded by: Charlene Drew Jarvis (acting)
- In office January 2, 1983 – January 2, 1991
- Preceded by: Arrington Dixon
- Succeeded by: John Wilson

Member of the Council of the District of Columbia from Ward 1
- In office January 2, 1975 – January 2, 1983
- Preceded by: Position established
- Succeeded by: Frank Smith

Personal details
- Born: David Allen Clarke; October 13, 1943 Baltimore, Maryland, U.S.
- Died: March 27, 1997 (aged 53) Washington, D.C., U.S.
- Party: Democratic
- Spouse: Carole Leavitt
- Children: 1
- Education: George Washington University (BA); Crozer Theological Seminary (attended); Howard University (JD)

David Allen Clarke (October 13, 1943 – March 27, 1997) was an American civil-rights worker, attorney, and Democratic politician in Washington, D.C. Elected as one of the original members of the Council of the District of Columbia when D.C. gained home rule in 1974, Clarke served as its chair from 1983 to 1991, and again from the death of John A. Wilson in 1993 until his own death in 1997.

The District of Columbia School of Law was renamed the David A. Clarke School of Law for Clarke in 1998.

== Early life and education ==
David Allen Clarke was born in Baltimore, Maryland, on October 13, 1943, to Allen Joseph Clarke and Ophia Carroll Clarke. His father died while he was an infant; he moved with his mother to Southwest Washington when he was 2.

Clarke's mother worked as a clerk at the United States Department of Agriculture. They later moved to the neighborhood of Shaw. Clarke attended public schools, namely Thompson Elementary School, Jefferson Junior High, and Western High School. Clarke's mother died of tuberculosis when Clarke was 16 years old, and he moved in with his aunt, who was also living in Shaw.

Clarke earned a Bachelor of Arts in religion from George Washington University in 1965. He then enrolled at Crozer Theological Seminary in Chester, Pennsylvania, but, wanting to take a more direct role in the Civil Rights Movement, after two weeks he transferred to the nearby Upland Institute for Social Change and Conflict Management. Upland then sent him back to Washington to work for Walter E. Fauntroy at the recently formed D.C. Coalition for Conscience.

When Greater Washington Board of Trade opposed home rule for the District, Clarke protested next to the Washington Monument on July 4, 1966. When Clarke began reading the United States Declaration of Independence, he was arrested.

Clarke decided to pursue a Juris Doctor from Howard University School of Law. While a student, Clarke was a research assistant for his mentor Frank D. Reeves and clerked at the N.A.A.C.P. Legal Defense Fund, including arranging legal assistance for demonstrators participating in the Poor People's Campaign, particularly the Resurrection City encampment on the Mall.

== Career ==
After finishing law school, he worked briefly for the U.S. Senate Committee on Nutrition and Human Needs, and then became Director of the Washington Bureau of the Southern Christian Leadership Conference. In 1972, two years before Home Rule, Clarke opened a private law practice. In 1974, David Clarke was elected as the Ward One Representative on the first Council of the District of Columbia elected by District of Columbia voters—of the 13 members of the first council, only two had graduated from law school and “Dave was the only attorney that won in that whole election. Everybody else was a community activist.” (Arrington Dixon had graduated from law school but never practiced.)

During his eight years as the representative of Ward One, he chaired Council's Judiciary Committee, was a member of the Council's Housing and Finance committee, and chaired the Metropolitan Washington Council of Governments's Public Safety Committee, where he was a proponent of gun control.

After two terms representing Ward 1, Clarke was elected Chair (a separate seat, elected at-large) in 1982. He served as Chair of Council for eight more years, then ran for Mayor in 1990—the only election he ever lost. As Chair of Council he had helped create the DC School of Law, and after leaving Council he co-founded a Legislation Clinic—a legal clinic focused on "legislative and regulatory advocacy"—at the School, serving as co-director for several years. In 1993 he ran for Chair again in the special election following the death of John A Wilson, and remained Chair until his own death. During his return to the Chairmanship, the School of Law was merged with the University of the District of Columbia, and after his death the School was renamed the David A. Clarke School of Law in his honor.

While on the Council, he was known for an ability to transcend race, a legacy from his experience as an activist and important in a racially divided district. His aggressive style at times made consensus-building difficult.

Clarke died of a central nervous system lymphoma, a form of brain cancer. He was survived by his wife, a city schoolteacher, and one son.

=== Timeline ===
- November 5, 1974 – elected Ward 1 council member
- November 7, 1978 – reelected Ward 1 council member
- November 2, 1982 – elected council chairman
- November 4, 1986 – reelected council chairman
- September 11, 1990 – ran for mayor; defeated in primary by Sharon Pratt Dixon
- September 14, 1993 – elected council chairman in special election after death of John A. Wilson with 47 percent, beating Charlene Drew Jarvis (29 percent), Linda Cropp (16 percent), and Marie Drissel (6 percent)
- November 8, 1994 – reelected council chairman
- December 30, 1996 – entered Georgetown University Hospital; council chairman pro tempore Charlene Drew Jarvis took over as acting chairman
- March 27, 1997 – died in office

=== Awards and legacy ===
Clarke received numerous awards for his community service initiatives including Outstanding Alumnus Award, Greater Washington Howard University Law School Alumni Association; Achievement Award, Elks Department of Civil Liberties League # 194; Human Rights Award, Ancient Independent Order of Moses; and the Washington Inner City Self-Help, Outstanding Service to Community Award. The University of the District of Columbia's Law School also bears his name: "The University of the District of Columbia David A. Clarke School of Law."

Political offices
Preceded by Arrington Dixon	Chair of the Council of the District of Columbia; 1983–1991	Succeeded by John Wilson
Preceded by John L. Ray; Acting	Chair of the Council of the District of Columbia; 1993–1997; On leave: 1996–1997	Succeeded by Charlene Drew Jarvis; Acting
