= Charlene Drew Jarvis =

American politician

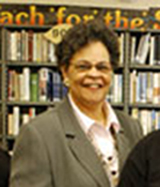

Chair of the Council of the District of Columbia
- Acting
- In office December 30, 1996 – May 7, 1997
- Preceded by: David A. Clarke
- Succeeded by: Linda W. Cropp

Chair pro tempore of the Council of the District of Columbia
- In office September 5, 1997 – January 2, 2001
- Preceded by: Harold Brazil
- Succeeded by: Jack Evans
- In office September 14, 1993 – May 7, 1997
- Preceded by: John L. Ray
- Succeeded by: Harold Brazil

Member of the Council of the District of Columbia from Ward 4
- In office May 1, 1979 – January 2, 2001
- Preceded by: Arrington Dixon
- Succeeded by: Adrian Fenty

Personal details
- Born: Charlene Rosella Drew; July 31, 1941 (age 84) Washington, D.C., U.S.
- Party: Democratic
- Spouse: Ernest Jarvis (m. 1966–1982)
- Children: 2
- Relatives: Charles Drew (father)
- Education: Oberlin College (BA); Howard University (MS); University of Maryland, College Park (PhD)

Charlene Drew Jarvis (born July 31, 1941, in Washington, D.C. as Charlene Rosella Drew) is an American educator and former scientific researcher and politician who served as the president of Southeastern University until March 31, 2009. Jarvis is the daughter of the blood plasma and blood transfusion pioneer Charles Drew.

== Life ==
Jarvis earned her Bachelor of Arts degree from Oberlin College in 1962, a Master of Science degree in psychology from Howard University in 1964, and a Doctor of Philosophy degree in neuropsychology from the University of Maryland, College Park, in 1971.

Ward 4's representative to the Council of the District of Columbia, Arrington Dixon, won the election for chairman of the council in November 1978, leaving the Ward 4 seat vacant. Jarvis won the special election to fill the seat on May 1, 1979. She was then reelected to the council in 1980, 1984, 1988, 1992, and 1996. Jarvis sought reelection again in 2000, but she was defeated in the Democratic primary by Adrian Fenty who also holds degrees from Oberlin and Howard University.

== Electoral history ==
=== 1979 ===
Council of the District of Columbia, Ward 4, Special Election, 1979
Party	Candidate	Votes	%
Democratic	Charlene Drew Jarvis	3,615	28
Democratic	Norman C. Neverson	2,280	18
Democratic	Dorothy Maultsby	1,430	11
Democratic	Victoria T. Street	1,325	10
Democratic	Barry Campbell	878	7
Democratic	Nathaniel "Nate" Sims	726	6
Democratic	Richard Clark	657	5
Democratic	Goldie Cornelius Johnson	459	4
Democratic	Andrew W. Coleman	451	4
Democratic	Mary G. Prahinski	259	2
Democratic	Malcolm W. Diggs	239	2
Democratic	William Revely	200	2
DC Statehood	Gregory A. Rowe	78	1
Democratic	Ernest Bowman	51	0
Democratic	Robert V. Brown	39	0
Democratic	Felix B. Redmond	12	0

=== 1980 ===
Council of the District of Columbia, Ward 4, Democratic Primary Election, 1980
Party	Candidate	Votes	%
Democratic	Charlene Drew Jarvis		
Democratic	Write-in candidates		

Council of the District of Columbia, Ward 4, Democratic General Election, 1980
Party	Candidate	Votes	%
Democratic	Charlene Drew Jarvis	20,127	94
Republican	Israel Lopez	1,297	6

=== 1984 ===
Council of the District of Columbia, Ward 4, Democratic Primary Election, 1984
Party	Candidate	Votes	%
Democratic	Charlene Drew Jarvis	8,687	75
Democratic	Barbara Lett Simmons	2,884	25

Council of the District of Columbia, Ward 4, Democratic General Election, 1984
Party	Candidate	Votes	%
Democratic	Charlene Drew Jarvis	22,226	97
	Write-in candidates	687	3

=== 1988 ===
Council of the District of Columbia, Ward 4, Democratic Primary Election, 1988
Party	Candidate	Votes	%
Democratic	Charlene Drew Jarvis	5,767	52
Democratic	Linda Cropp	5,173	47
Democratic	Write-in candidates	50	1

Council of the District of Columbia, Ward 4, Democratic General Election, 1988
Party	Candidate	Votes	%
Democratic	Charlene Drew Jarvis	22,123	88
DC Statehood	Dennis Fitch	1,583	6
Republican	George T. Farrell III	1,277	5

=== 1990 ===
Mayor of the District of Columbia, Democratic Party Primary Election, 1990
Party	Candidate	Votes	%
Democratic	Sharon Pratt Dixon	43,426	34
Democratic	John L. Ray	32,255	26
Democratic	Charlene Drew Jarvis	27,063	21
Democratic	David A. Clarke	13,768	11
Democratic	Walter E. Fauntroy	9,261	7
Democratic	Write-in candidates	555	0

=== 1992 ===
Council of the District of Columbia, Ward 4, Democratic Primary Election, 1992
Party	Candidate	Votes	%
Democratic	Charlene Drew Jarvis	7,316	50
Democratic	F. Alexis Roberson	7,202	49
Democratic	Write-in candidates	111	1

Council of the District of Columbia, Ward 4, Democratic General Election, 1992
Party	Candidate	Votes	%
Democratic	Charlene Drew Jarvis	22,720	77
Independent	Taalib Din Ugdah	5,246	18
Republican	Paul V. Brown	1,162	4
	Write-in candidates	388	1

=== 1996 ===
Council of the District of Columbia, Ward 4, Democratic Primary Election, 1996
Party	Candidate	Votes	%
Democratic	Charlene Drew Jarvis	5,237	53
Democratic	Dwight E. Singleton	2,464	25
Democratic	Diane Miller	1,555	16
Democratic	Pat Kidd	597	6
Democratic	Write-in candidates	78	1

Council of the District of Columbia, Ward 4, Democratic General Election, 1996
Party	Candidate	Votes	%
Democratic	Charlene Drew Jarvis	18,291	78
Umoja	Rick Malachi	4,839	21
	Write-in candidates	217	1

=== 2000 ===
Council of the District of Columbia, Ward 4, Democratic Primary Election, 2000
Party	Candidate	Votes	%
Democratic	Adrian Fenty	8,136	57
Democratic	Charlene Drew Jarvis	6,193	43
Democratic	Write-in candidates	51	0

Council of the District of Columbia
Preceded by John L. Ray	Chair pro tempore of the Council of the District of Columbia; 1993–1997	Succeeded by Harold Brazil
Preceded by Harold Brazil	Chair pro tempore of the Council of the District of Columbia; 1997–2001	Succeeded by Jack Evans
Political offices
Preceded by David A. Clarke	Chair of the Council of the District of Columbia; Acting; 1996–1997	Succeeded by Linda W. Cropp
