= Harold Brazil =

American attorney and politician

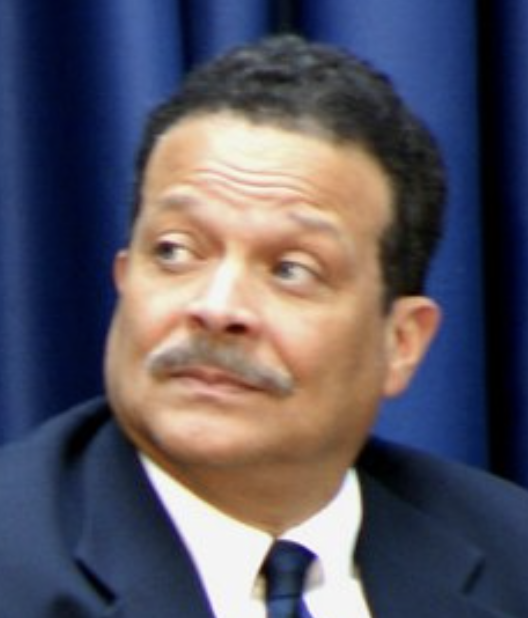

Chair pro tempore of the Council of the District of Columbia
- In office May 7, 1997 – September 5, 1997
- Preceded by: Charlene Drew Jarvis
- Succeeded by: Charlene Drew Jarvis

Member of the Council of the District of Columbia from the at-large district
- In office January 2, 1997 – January 2, 2005
- Preceded by: John L. Ray
- Succeeded by: Kwame R. Brown

Member of the Council of the District of Columbia from Ward 6
- In office January 2, 1991 – January 2, 1997
- Preceded by: Nadine Winter
- Succeeded by: Sharon Ambrose

Personal details
- Born: December 13, 1947 (age 78)
- Party: Democratic
- Spouse: Crystal Palmer
- Education: Ohio State University (BA, JD); Georgetown University (LLM)

Harold Brazil (born December 13, 1947) is a former attorney and Democratic politician in Washington, D.C.

== Early years ==
Originally from Columbus, Ohio, Brazil graduated from Bishop Hartley High School. Brazil earned a Bachelor of Arts degree and a Juris Doctor from Ohio State University and an L.L.M. from Georgetown University Law Center.

== Political career ==
Brazil moved to Washington, D.C., to work as a law clerk for Robert M. Duncan, a judge on the United States Court of Appeals for the Armed Forces. Brazil later served as a United States Attorney for the District of Columbia from 1978 to 1980. Brazil worked in the office of Senator John Glenn between 1980 and 1984. In 1984, Brazil began working as a lobbyist for Pepco. Brazil was a member of the D.C. General Hospital Commission in 1989.

After resigning from his position at Pepco, Brazil announced his candidacy to represent Ward 6 on the Council of the District of Columbia in April 1990. Brazil ran against Nadine Winter, the four-term incumbent. Brazil supported increasing penalties for repeat offenders and violent criminals and increasing funding for law enforcement officers. The editorial board of The Washington Post endorsed Brazil's candidacy.

Brazil won the Democratic primary election, with 43 percent of the vote. Brazil advanced to the general election, where he was on the ballot with the D.C. Statehood Party's candidate, R. Bradford McMahon. Brazil won the general election, with 93 percent of the vote. Brazil served from 1991 to 2005, first representing Ward 6 and then as an at-large member.

In 2004, Kwame R. Brown challenged Brazil's reelection campaign. Brown criticized Brazil for treating his Council position as a part-time job and serving as a rubber stamp for the Mayor. Brown won the Democratic Party primary election with 54 percent of the vote, compared to Brazil's 32 percent.

== Later years ==
In October 2008, Brazil and two women entered a tattoo shop in Georgetown. One woman went to the back to get a tattoo, but the shopkeeper said that rules prohibited the other woman to go with her. According to Brazil, Brazil objected, and the shopkeeper became rude, cursed Brazil, called him a racial slur, and beat him so much that he required medical treatment for his injuries. The shopkeeper said Brazil was the one who became belligerent, cursed the shopkeeper, and then urinated on the floor. In May 2009, Brazil was convicted of assault. The judge sentenced Brazil to 90 days of imprisonment, but the judge suspended the sentence on the condition that Brazil completes six months of unsupervised probation.

On July 1, 2014, the District of Columbia Bar admonished Brazil for improperly safeguarding clients' property, failure to represent a client diligently, and failure to act with reasonable promptness in representing a client. On January 18, 2018, he was disbarred by consent.

Council of the District of Columbia
Preceded by Charlene Drew Jarvis	Chair pro tempore of the Council of the District of Columbia; 1997	Succeeded by Charlene Drew Jarvis
