= John A. Wilson (politician) =

American politician (1943-1993)

John Wilson

4th Chair of the Council of the District of Columbia
- In office January 2, 1991 – May 19, 1993
- Preceded by: David A. Clarke
- Succeeded by: John L. Ray (acting)

Member of the Council of the District of Columbia from Ward 2
- In office January 2, 1975 – January 2, 1991
- Preceded by: Position established
- Succeeded by: Jack Evans

Personal details
- Born: John Augustus Wilson; September 29, 1943 Baltimore, Maryland, U.S.
- Died: May 19, 1993 (aged 49) Washington, D.C., U.S.
- Party: Democratic
- Education: University of Maryland, Eastern Shore (attended); Bowie State University (BA)

John Augustus Wilson (September 29, 1943 – May 19, 1993) was an American politician. He served as the first Councilmember of the D.C. Council from the District of Columbia's Ward 2, as well as Chairman of the D.C. Council. The John A. Wilson Building, in the District of Columbia, is named after him.

== Politician ==
Raised by adoptive parents on the Eastern Shore, Wilson quit college to become an organizer and later national vice chairman for the Student Non-Violent Coordinating Committee. During a stint as a community organizer in New York City, he worked with Malcolm X, whom he bragged once called him "one of the funniest guys in the movement."

In the 1960s, Wilson was active in the civil rights movement, first with the National Association for the Advancement of Colored People (NAACP) and then with the Student Nonviolent Coordinating Committee (SNCC). In 1969, Wilson moved to Washington, D.C. to become the legislative director for the National Sharecropper's Fund, an advocacy group for migrant farm workers. He helped run its Washington office for six years. In 1971, Wilson was co-chairman for the campaign of Walter E. Fauntroy, who became the city's first delegate to Congress. Wilson ran successfully for the D.C. Council in 1974. He was also co-chaired the District of Columbia Democratic State Committee and was elected to represent D.C. on the Democratic National Committee in 1992.

Wilson served in 1974 as the chairman of the drive to approve the referendum to adopt the Home Rule Charter for the District of Columbia. The charter allowed residents for the first time to elect both a mayor and a 13-member city council called the Council of the District of Columbia. After approval of the charter in 1974, Wilson successfully ran for election to the council, representing Ward 2, which at that time was the most diverse ward in the city. He represented Ward 2 until he was sworn in as Chair of the Council on January 2, 1991. He served as Chair until his death by suicide on May 19, 1993.

During Wilson's tenure as the Ward 2 council member, he chaired the Committee on Finance and Revenue and was widely acknowledged as an expert in municipal finances. His early warnings about government overspending proved prophetic, eventually leading the U.S. Congress to establish a financial control board to oversee the city's finances for a number of years.

Wilson's legislative record includes controls on converting rental housing to condominiums, gun control, rent control, and expanded medical coverage for women and children. He wrote the District's tough anti-hate crimes laws as well as its human rights law, which is one of the most comprehensive in the country.

== Academia ==
During his council years, Wilson was a Harvard Fellow at the John F. Kennedy School of Government. He also attended the Senior Executive Program for State and Local Government at Harvard University.

Political offices
Preceded by David A. Clarke	Chair of the Council of the District of Columbia; 1991–1993	Succeeded by John L. Ray; Acting
