= Mayor of the District of Columbia =

Head of the executive branch of the D.C. government

- Seal of the District of Columbia

- Flag of the District of Columbia

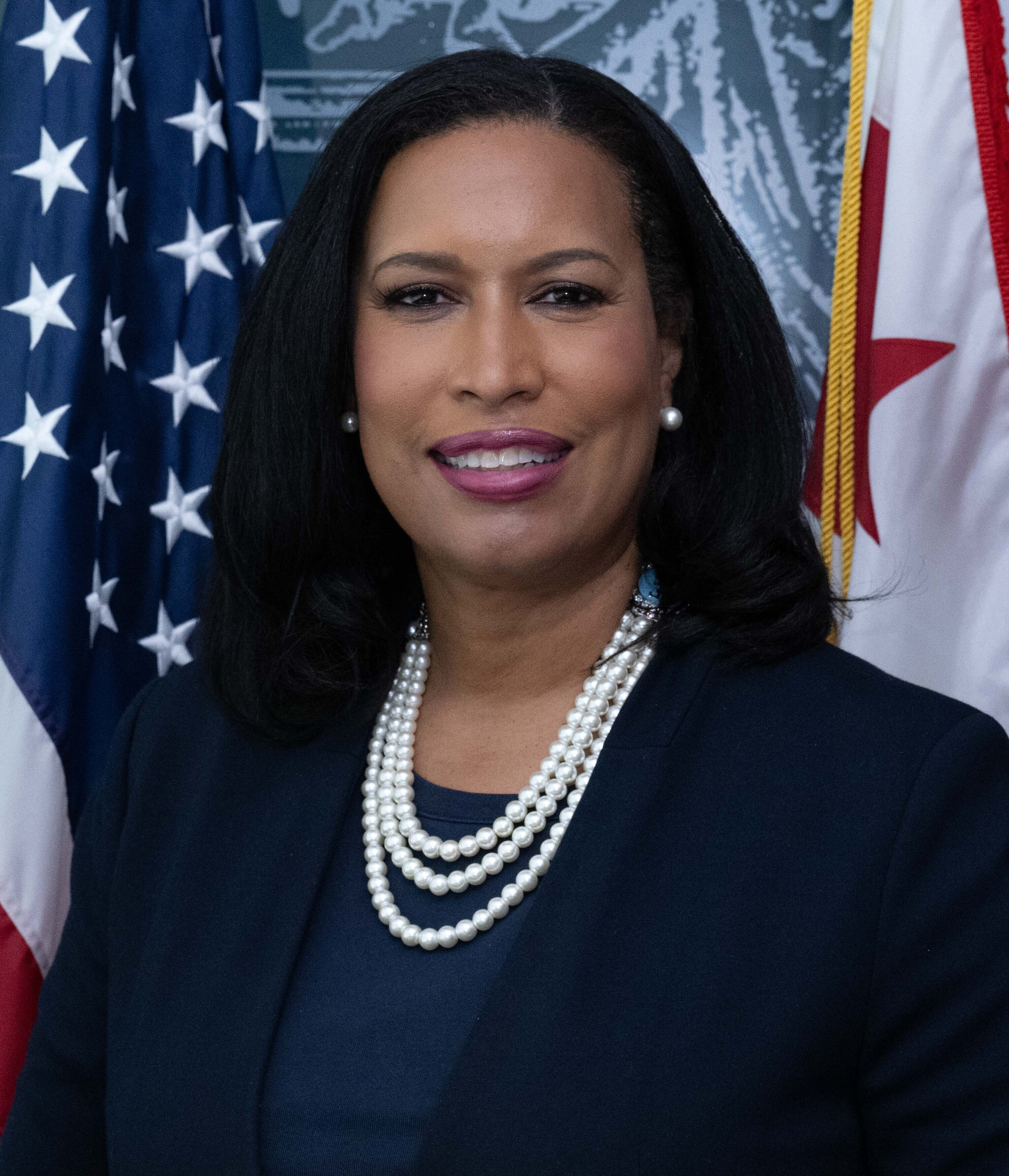
- Incumbent; Muriel Bowser since January 2, 2015
- Government of the District of Columbia; Office of the Mayor of the District of Columbia
- Appointer: Electorate of the District of Columbia
- Term length: Four years, renewable with no limit
- Inaugural holder: Walter Washington
- Formation: 1973
- Salary: US$250,000
- Website: mayor.dc.gov

The mayor of the District of Columbia is the head of the executive branch of the government of the District of Columbia. The mayor has the duty to enforce district laws, and the power to either approve or veto bills passed by the D.C. Council. In addition, the mayor oversees all district services, public property, police and fire protection, most public agencies, and the district public school system. Although the District of Columbia is not a state, the mayor oversees its government in a manner similar to that of a state governor.

The mayor's office oversees an annual district budget of $8.8 billion. The mayor's executive office is located in the John A. Wilson Building in Downtown. The mayor appoints several officers, including the deputy mayors for Education and Planning & Economic Development, the district administrator, the chancellor of the district's public schools, and the department heads of the district agencies.

== History of governance ==
At its official formation in 1801 by Act of Congress, the district consisted of five political subdivisions, including three cities with their own municipal governments and two rural counties. The City of Washington was one of those three cities. Newly chartered shortly after the district, in 1802, the City of Washington had its own list of mayors from 1802 through 1871. From 1802 to 1812, the mayor was appointed by the President of the United States; the City of Washington's first mayor was Robert Brent, appointed in 1802 by Thomas Jefferson. Between 1812 and 1820, the city's mayors were then selected by executive council. In 1820, the federal charter was amended to allow the mayor to be popularly elected, although only white male property owners could vote. In 1848, the property ownership requirement was lifted, and in 1867, Congress extended the franchise to black men over President Andrew Johnson's veto.

The district as a whole had no governor or any other executive position in that period.

In 1871, with the District of Columbia Organic Act, the three remaining subdivisions within the district, Washington City, Georgetown, and Washington County, were unified into a single government. The office of mayor was abolished and the executive became a territorial governor appointed by the president. The district was overseen by governors, then by a three-member board of commissioners, until 1967.

In 1967, President Lyndon B. Johnson created a more modern government headed by a single commissioner, popularly known as "mayor-commissioner," and a nine-member district council, all appointed by the president. Walter E. Washington was named to the post, and was retained by Johnson's successor, Richard Nixon. Washington was the only occupant of that position.

== Creation of mayorship ==
In 1973, Congress enacted the District of Columbia Home Rule Act, providing for an elected mayor and 13-member district council, with the first elections to take place the following year. Incumbent mayor-commissioner Walter Washington was elected the first home-rule Mayor of the District of Columbia on November 5, 1974. He took office on January 2, 1975, heading the district's first popularly-elected government in over a century.

The local government, particularly during the mayoralty of Washington's successor, Marion Barry (1979–1991), was criticized for mismanagement and waste. Barry defeated Mayor Washington in the 1978 Democratic Party primary. Barry was then elected mayor, serving three successive four-year terms. During his administration in 1989, The Washington Monthly magazine claimed that the district had "the worst city government in America". After being imprisoned for six months on misdemeanor drug charges in 1990, Barry did not run for reelection. In 1991, Sharon Pratt Kelly became the first woman to lead the district.

Barry was elected again in 1994, and by the next year the district had become nearly insolvent. In 1995, Congress created the District of Columbia Financial Control Board to oversee all municipal spending and rehabilitate the district government. Mayor Anthony Williams won election in 1998. His administration oversaw a period of greater prosperity, urban renewal, and budget surpluses. The district regained control over its finances in 2001 and the oversight board's operations were suspended.

Williams did not seek reelection in 2006. Council member Adrian Fenty defeated Council Chairwoman Linda Cropp in that year's Democratic primary race to succeed Williams as mayor and started his term in 2007. Shortly upon taking office, Fenty won approval from the district council to directly manage and overhaul the district's under-performing public school system. However, Fenty lost a Democratic Party primary to former Council Chair Vincent Gray in August 2010. Mayor Gray won the general election and assumed office in January 2011 with a pledge to bring economic opportunities to more of the district's residents and under-served areas. Gray in turn lost the subsequent Democratic Party primary in 2014 to Councilmember Muriel Bowser, who went on to win the general election and was then reelected in 2018 and 2022, making her only the second person to serve three consecutive terms as Mayor of the District of Columbia.

Currently, the mayor of the District of Columbia is popularly elected to a four-year term with no term limits. Even though the District of Columbia is not a state, the district government also has certain state-level responsibilities, making some of the mayor's duties analogous to those of United States governors.

== Official residence controversy ==
The mayor of the District of Columbia has no official residence, although the establishment of one has been proposed several times in the years since the office was established in 1974. In 2000, Mayor Anthony A. Williams appointed, with the District of Columbia Council's approval, a commission to study the possibilities of acquiring property and a building to be used as the official residence of the District of Columbia's mayor. The commission examined several possibilities, including the Old Naval Hospital on Capitol Hill, the warden's house at St. Elizabeth's Hospital, and several former embassies and chanceries before issuing a final report recommending a plan proposed by the Eugene B. Casey Foundation to privately finance the construction of a residence in District of Columbia's Foxhall neighborhood and donate it to the district under the name of The Casey Mansion.

The council approved the plan in 2001. However, residents objected to the plan on the grounds that it aggrandized and insulated the mayor from his constituents; that the location, rather than symbolizing District of Columbia's economic and ethnic diversity, would place the mayor in one of the district's least diverse, wealthiest, and most exclusive communities; and, especially, that the Casey Foundation's plan required the acquisition of 1.8 acres (0.73 ha) of national park land to be used as private grounds for the mansion. After several months of delays caused by these political entanglements, the project began movement in October 2003; that December, however, the Casey Foundation suddenly announced that it was abandoning plans for a mayoral residence and donating the land to the Salvation Army. Plans for an official residence have remained inactive ever since.

== Elections ==
The mayor is elected every four years and can be re-elected without term limits. Candidates must live and be registered to vote in the District of Columbia for one year prior to the date of the election. Elections take place in the same year as the midterm Congressional elections on election day in November. However, since the electorate of the district is overwhelmingly Democratic (over 80 percent), in practice the mayor is almost always determined in the Democratic primary election, held on the second Tuesday in September.

The mayor is sworn in on January 2 following the election, taking the following oath:

I, (mayor's name), do solemnly swear (or affirm) that I will faithfully execute the laws of the United States of America and of the District of Columbia, and will to the best of my ability, preserve, protect and defend the Constitution of the United States, and will faithfully discharge the duties of the office of Mayor of the District of Columbia, which I am about to enter.

== Succession ==
The chairman of the District of Columbia Council becomes acting mayor when a mayor dies in office, resigns, or is unable to carry out the duties of mayor. The chairman serves until a special election can be held and certified by the District of Columbia Board of Elections and Ethics. At least 114 days must pass between the mayoral vacancy and the special election, which is held on the first Tuesday thereafter, unless a general election would have been held not more than sixty days earlier than the special election would otherwise have been held. As of August 2026, no such vacancy has ever occurred.

== Duties and powers ==
The mayor has the responsibility to enforce all district law; administer and coordinate district departments, including the appointment of a District Administrator and heads of the departments (subject to confirmation by the council); to set forth policies and agendas to the council, and prepare and submit the district budget at the end of each fiscal year. The mayor has the powers to either approve or veto bills passed by the District of Columbia Council; to submit drafts of legislation to the council; and to propose federal legislation or action directly to the president and/or Congress of the United States. As head of the district's executive branch, the mayor has the power to draft and enact executive orders relative to the departments and officials under their jurisdiction and to reorganize any entities within the executive branch (except in the case of formal disapproval by the council). Additionally, the mayor reserves the right to be heard by the council or any of its committees.

== See also ==
- List of mayors of Washington, D.C.
- Timeline of Washington, D.C.
