= Linda W. Cropp =

American politician (born 1947)

Linda Cropp
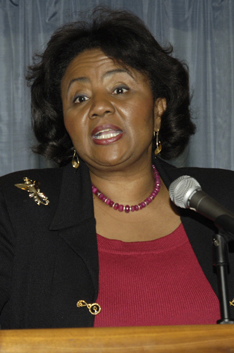
- Cropp speaking in February 2006

6th Chair of the Council of the District of Columbia
- In office May 7, 1997 – January 3, 2007; Acting: May 7, 1997 – July 22, 1997
- Preceded by: Charlene Drew Jarvis (acting)
- Succeeded by: Vincent C. Gray

Member of the Council of the District of Columbia from the at-large district
- In office January 2, 1991 – July 22, 1997
- Preceded by: Betty Ann Kane
- Succeeded by: Arrington Dixon

Personal details
- Born: October 5, 1947 (age 78) Atlanta, Georgia, U.S.
- Party: Democratic
- Spouse: Dwight Cropp
- Children: 2
- Education: Howard University (BA, MEd)

Linda Washington Cropp (born October 5, 1947)) is an American politician from Washington, D.C., the capital of the United States. She was a Democratic member of the Council of the District of Columbia, where she was the first woman to serve as the elected Council Chairman. On September 12, 2006, she lost the Democratic primary for mayor (57% to 31%) to Adrian Fenty. This loss came in spite of the fact that Cropp had been endorsed by outgoing mayor Anthony A. Williams. She was succeeded as Council Chairman by Vincent C. Gray.

== Early life and education ==
Cropp received a bachelor's degree in government from Howard University in 1969. In 1971, she received a Master of Education degree in guidance and counseling from Howard University. She was a student-teacher at Eastern Senior High School, where she met her husband. In 2002, Cropp received an Honorary Doctor of Humane Letters degree from the University of the District of Columbia and was awarded an Honorary Doctorate in Philosophy from the George Washington University in 2007.

== Career ==
From 1970 to 1978, Cropp worked as a teacher and counselor with the District of Columbia Public Schools.

In 1979, she ran for the District of Columbia Board of Education to represent Ward 4. At the time, she was a guidance counselor at Roosevelt Senior High School. Her candidacy was supported by then-Mayor Marion Barry. Cropp won the election, defeating opponent Victoria T. Street.

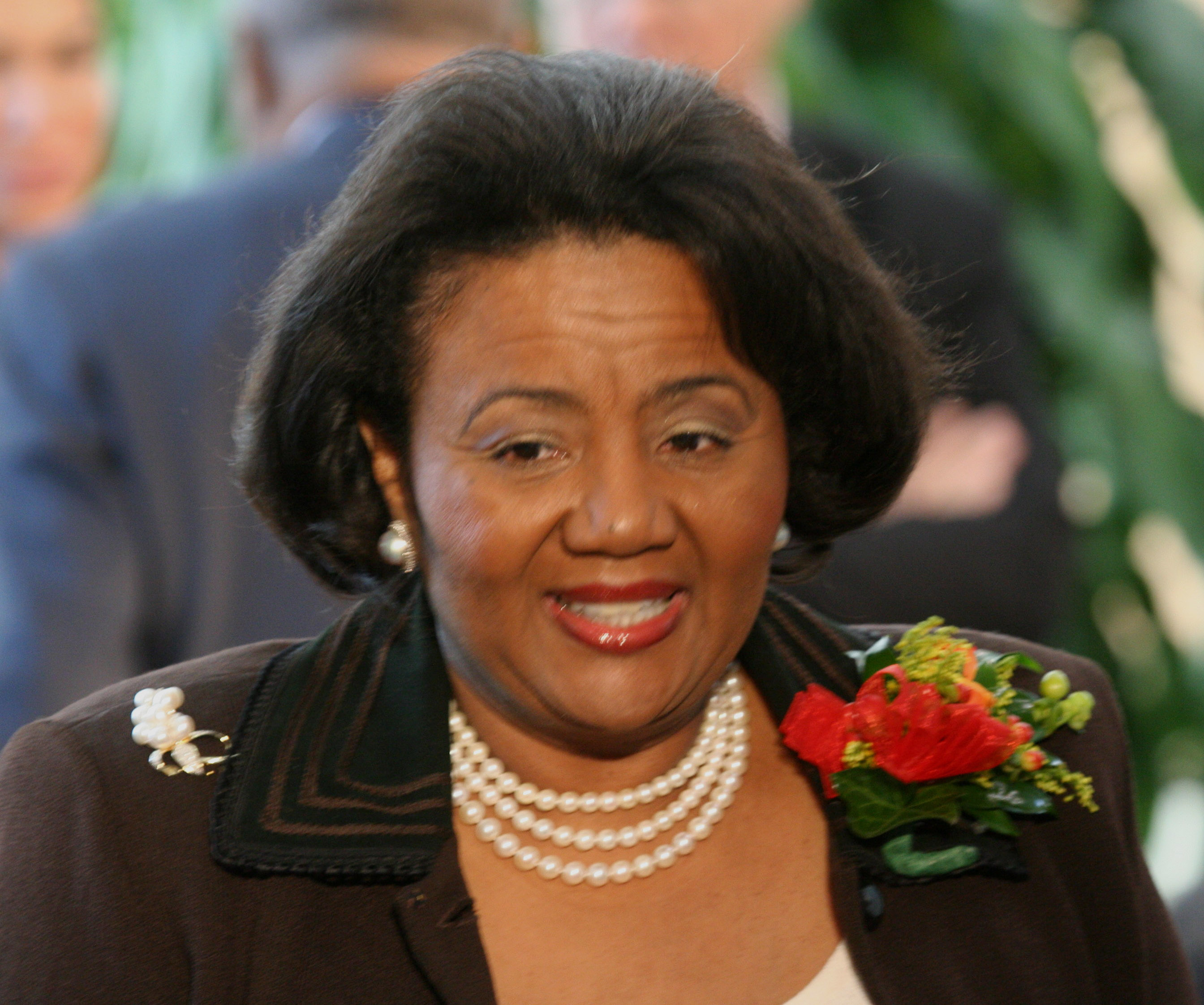
Cropp in 2007

Cropp started her first term representing Ward 4 on the D.C. Board of Education in 1980. She was elected vice president of the Board of Education in December 1984, and then president in January 1989.

In 1988, Cropp ran to represent Ward 4 on the Council of the District of Columbia. She criticized incumbent Charlene Drew Jarvis, saying Jarvis had too much allegiance to big businesses because they were the source of the great majority of her campaign contributions. Cropp also said that Jarvis had not done enough to help small businesses along Georgia Avenue. Jarvis criticized Cropp for the disappointing results of public schools under Cropp's leadership of the Board of Education. The editorial board of The Washington Post endorsed Jarvis' reelection. Cropp was defeated by Jarvis in the Democratic Party primary election, 47% to 52%. When Council Member Betty Ann Kane decided not to run for reelection to her at-large seat in 1990, Cropp ran to replace her. The editorial board of the Washington Post endorsed the campaign of her opponent, Johnny Barnes. Cropp won the Democratic Party primary election, receiving 51 percent of the vote; Johnny Barnes received 27 percent, and Terry Lynch received 22 percent. Cropp went on to win the general election with 38 percent of the vote.

- 1992 elected as chair of the Councilors Committee on Human Services
- 1994 re-elected at-large member of D.C. Council
- 1997 named acting Chairman of D.C. Council, following the death of David Clarke
- 1997 elected D.C. Council Chairman in a special election
- 1998 re-elected D.C. Council Chairman
- 2002 re-elected D.C. Council Chairman
- 2006 entered race for Mayor

After her 2006 loss, Cropp retired from politics. Cropp joined the board of two not-for-profit companies, the Community Preservation and Development Corp. and CareFirst BlueCross BlueShield, and also volunteered for two other local charities, Capital City Links and the D.C. chapter of Boys Town. In 2013, CareFirst BlueCross BlueShield promoted her to chairman of the board.

== Personal life ==
Cropp is married to Dwight S. Cropp, a doctor of public policy with a Ph.D. from George Washington University. She has two children and a grandson. She lives in Crestwood in Washington, D.C.

Political offices
Preceded by Charlene Drew Jarvis; Acting	Chair of the Council of the District of Columbia; 1997–2007	Succeeded by Vincent C. Gray
