= 2008 Council of the District of Columbia election =

- November 4, 2008

6 seats on the Council of the District of Columbia 7 seats needed for a majority
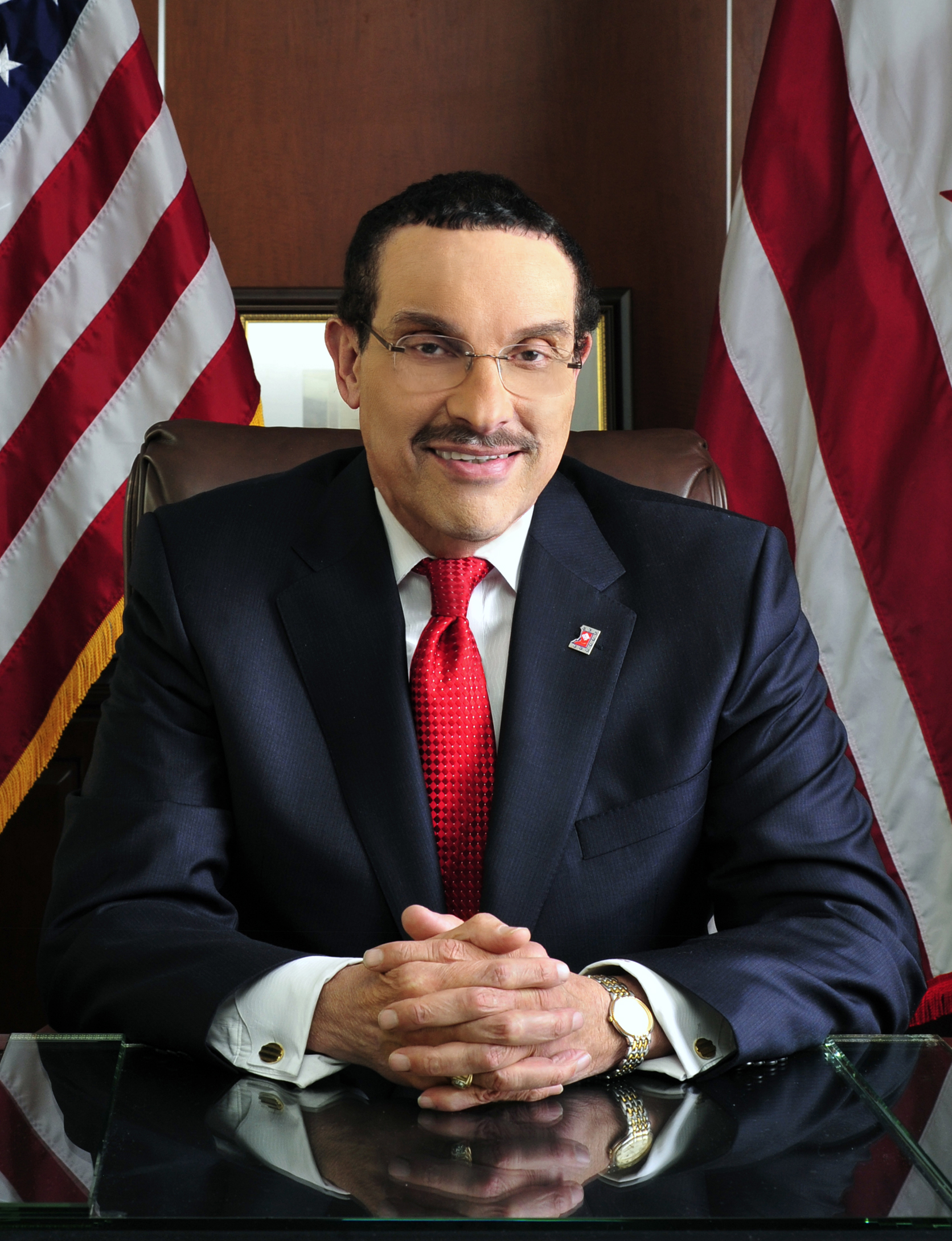

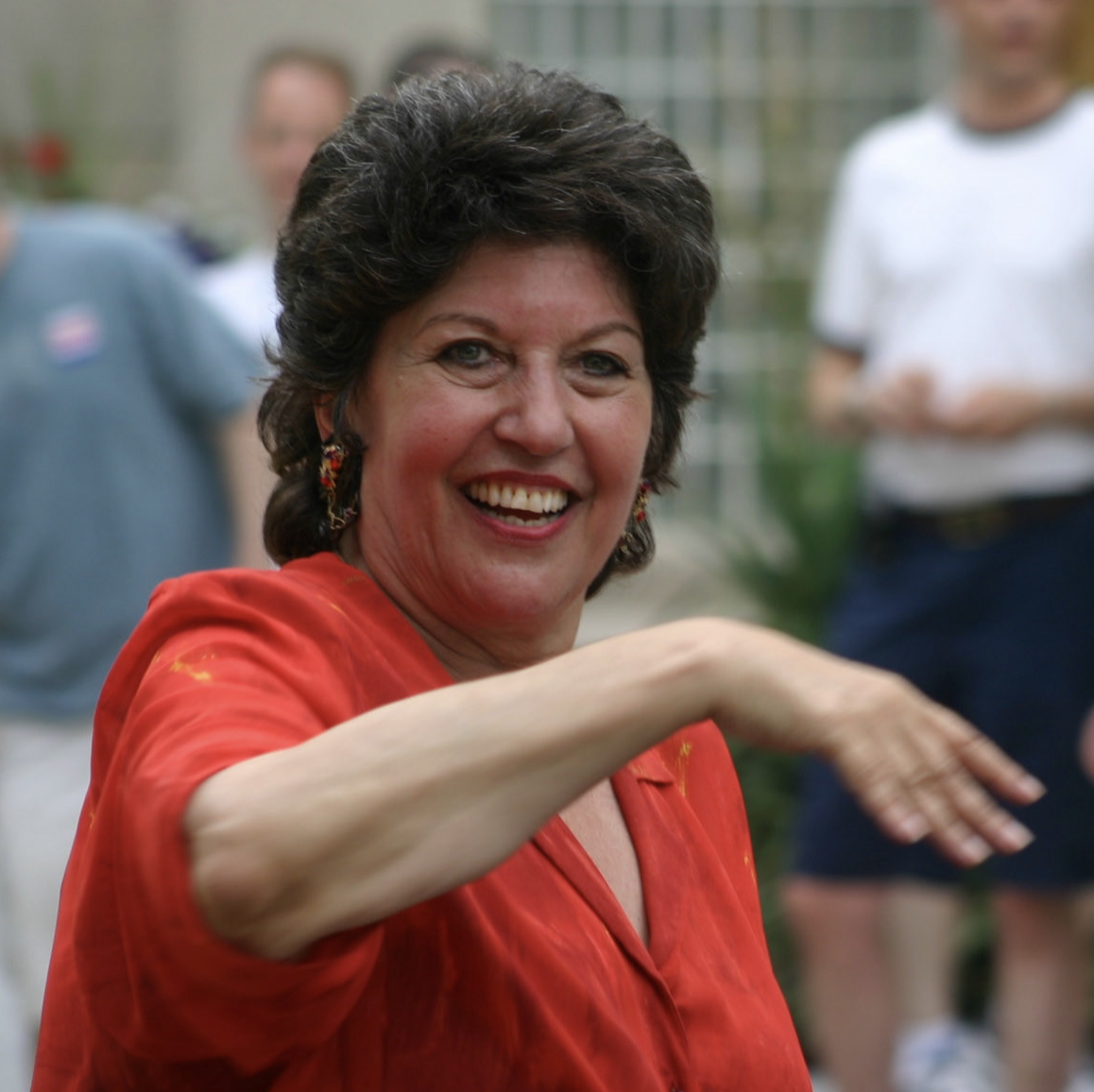

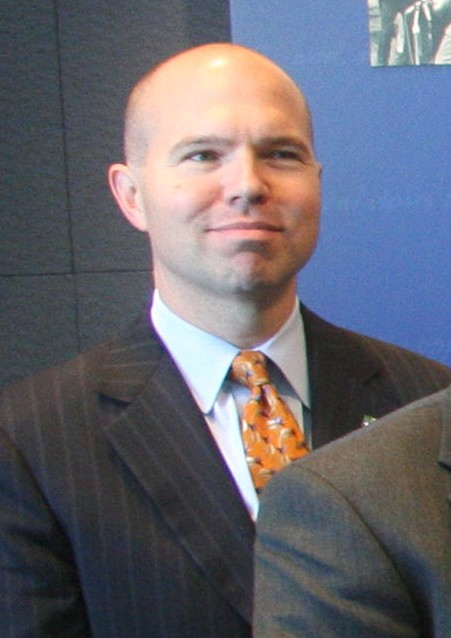
| | Majority party | Minority party | Third party |
|---|---|---|---|
| Leader | Vincent Gray | Carol Schwartz | David Catania |
| Party | Democratic | Republican | Independent |
| Seats before | 11 | 1 | 1 |
| Seats after | 11 | 0 | 2 |
| Seat change | Steady | ▼1 | ▲1 |

The 2008 Council of the District of Columbia election was held on November 4, with primaries taking place on September 9. The only councilmember to lose their seat was Republican At-large member Carol Schwartz, who lost in the Republican primary for the At-large nomination.

== Summary ==
Democrats retained their 11 seats and remained the largest party on the Council, with no seats being lost to other parties or independents. Republicans lost their sole remaining seat on the Council, while lone Independent David Catania was joined by Michael A. Brown

=== At-large ===
| Position | Incumbent | | | | Candidates |
| Position | Member | Party | First elected | Status | Candidates |
|---|---|---|---|---|---|
| At-large | Kwame Brown | Democratic | 2004 | Incumbent re-elected. | ▌ ✓ Kwame Brown 47.7%; ▌ ✓ Michael A. Brown 19.8%; ▌ Patrick Mara 10.4%; ▌ David Schwartzman 5.1%; ▌ Mark H. Long 4.0%; ▌ Dee Hunter 2.0%% |
| At-large | Carol Schwartz | Republican | 1996 | Incumbent lost re-election New member elected. Independent gain. | ▌ ✓ Kwame Brown 47.7%; ▌ ✓ Michael A. Brown 19.8%; ▌ Patrick Mara 10.4%; ▌ David Schwartzman 5.1%; ▌ Mark H. Long 4.0%; ▌ Dee Hunter 2.0%% |

=== Wards ===
| Position | Incumbent | | | | Candidates |
| Position | Member | Party | First elected | Status | Candidates |
|---|---|---|---|---|---|
| Ward 2 | Jack Evans | Democratic | 1991 (special) | Incumbent re-elected | ▌ ✓ Jack Evans 81.8%; ▌ Christina Erland Culver 17.3% |
| Ward 4 | Muriel Bowser | Democratic | 2006 | Incumbent re-elected | ▌ ✓ Muriel Bowser 97.1% |
| Ward 7 | Yvette Alexander | Democratic | 2007 (special) | Incumbent re-elected | ▌ ✓ Yvette Alexander 87.0%; ▌ Jimmy Johnson 7.6% |
| Ward 8 | Marion Barry | Democratic | 2004 (special) | Incumbent re-elected | ▌ ✓ Marion Barry 91.6%; ▌ Darrell Danny Gaston 4.3%; ▌ Yavocka Young 3.8% |

== At-large ==
2008 Council of the District of Columbia At-large election
- November 4, 2008
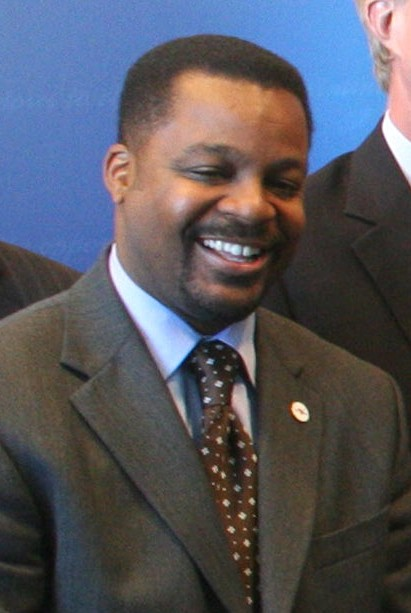

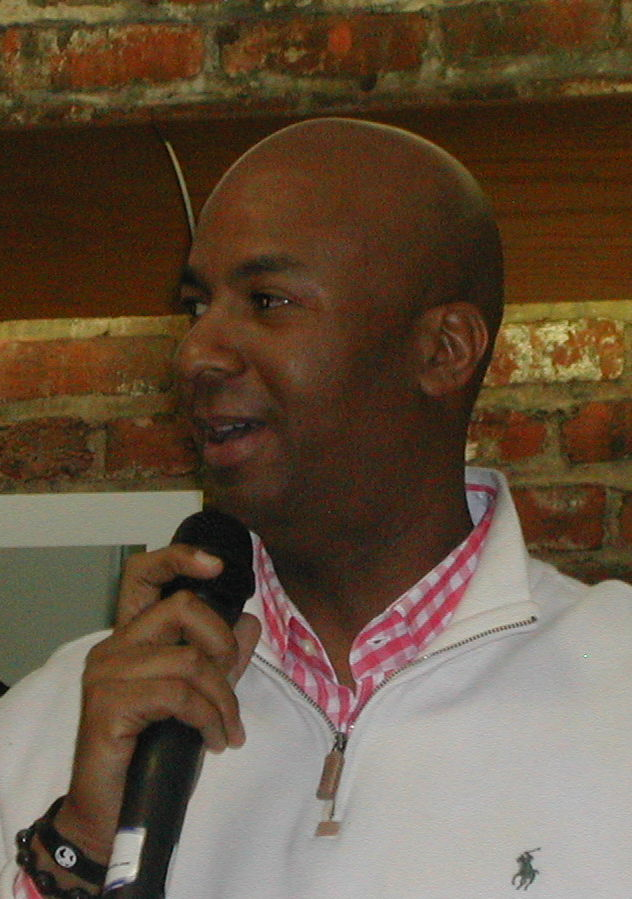

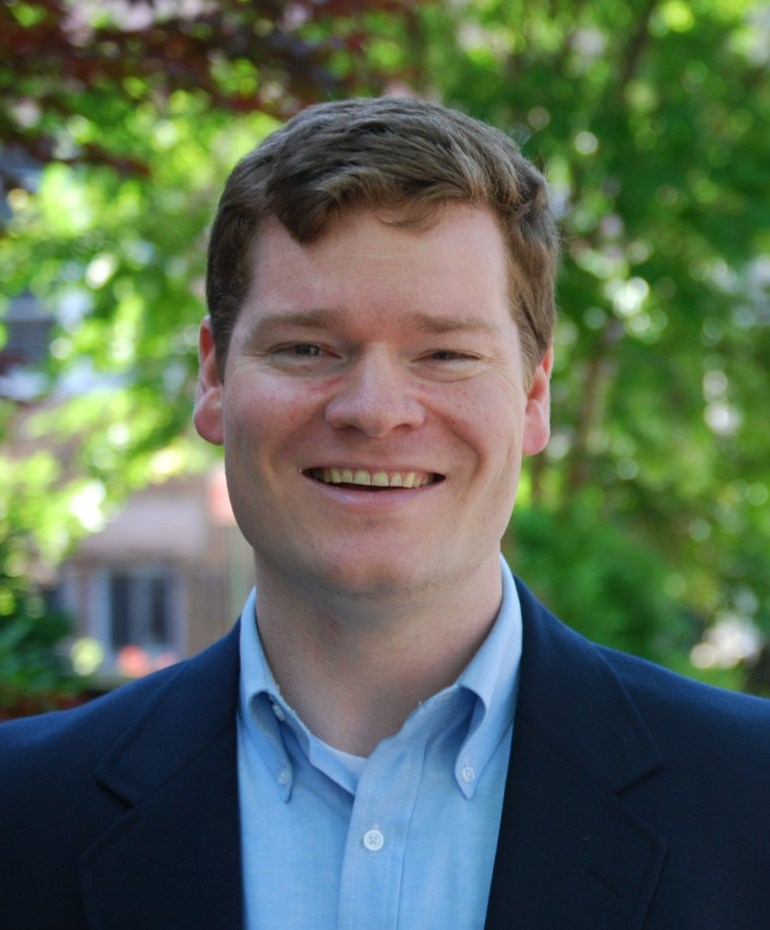

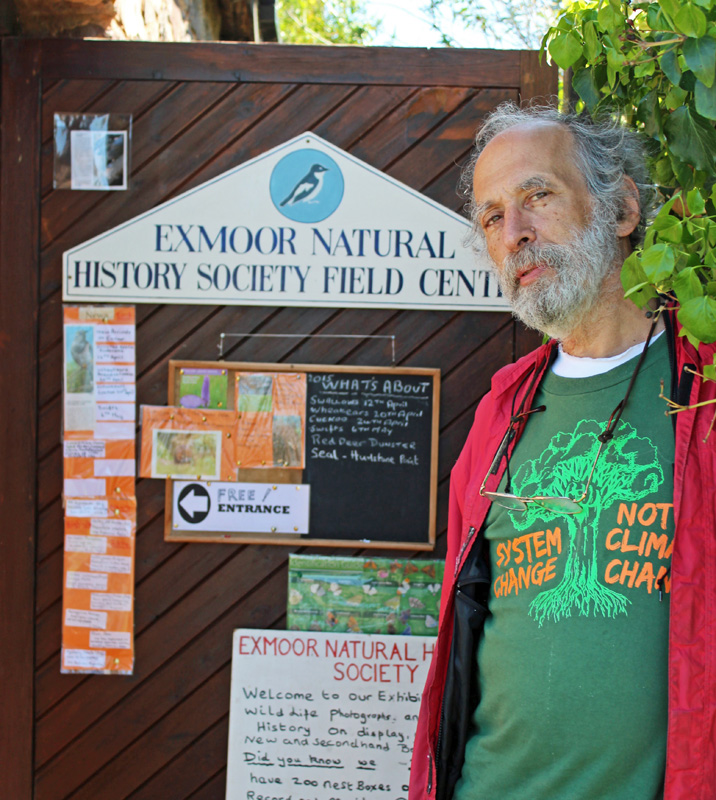

| Nominee | Kwame Brown | Michael A. Brown | Patrick Mara |
| Party | Democratic | Independent | Republican |
| Popular vote | 172,272 | 93,743 | 37,447 |
| Percentage | 47.66% | 30.93% | 10.36% |
| Nominee | David Schwartzman | Mark H. Long | Dee Hunter |
| Party | DC Statehood Green | Independent | Independent |
| Popular vote | 18,596 | 14,603 | 7,311 |
| Percentage | 5.14% | 4.04% | 2.02% |
Councilmembers before election
Kwame Brown (Dem.)
Carol Schwartz (Rep.)
Elected Councilmembers
Kwame Brown (Dem.)
Michael A. Brown (Ind.)

Three-term incumbent Republican Carol Schwartz failed to secure the nomination of her party to run for a fourth term in the primary, losing to younger challenger Patrick Mara. Mara ultimately lost to Independent candidate Michael A. Brown.

=== Democratic primary ===
Candidates

- Kwame Brown, incumbent At-large Councilmember

Endorsements

Kwame Brown

Local officials

- Yvette Alexander, incumbent Ward 7 Councilmember
- Marion Barry, incumbent Ward 8 Councilmember
- Muriel Bowser, incumbent Ward 4 Councilmember
- David Catania, incumbent Independent At-large Councilmember
- Mary Cheh, incumbent Ward 3 Councilmember
- Jack Evans, incumbent Ward 2 Councilmember
- Jim Graham, incumbent Ward 1 Councilmember
- Vincent Gray, incumbent Council Chair
- Harry Thomas Jr., incumbent Ward 5 Councilmember
- Tommy Wells, incumbent Ward 6 Councilmember

Organizations

- Capital Stonewall Democrats
- Sierra Club

2008 Council of the District of Columbia At-large Democratic primary
| Party | Candidate | Votes | % |
|---|---|---|---|
| Democratic | Kwame Brown (inc.) | 35,384 | 64.40% |
| Write-in | | 812 | 2.24% |
| Total votes | | 36,196 | 100% |

=== Republican primary ===
After being defeated by Mara in the primary election, Schwartz mounted a write-in campaign which was ultimately unsuccessful.

Candidates

- Patrick Mara, political consultant
- Carol Schwartz, incumbent At-large Councilmember

Endorsements

Patrick Mara

Local officials

- David Catania, incumbent Independent At-large Councilmember
- Michael Steele, former Lieutenant Governor of Maryland (2003-2007)

Organizations

- District of Columbia Chamber of Commerce
- Greater Washington Board of Trade

Publications

- The Washington Post
Carol Schwartz

Labor unions

- SEIU local 32BJ

Local officials

- Muriel Bowser, incumbent Ward 4 Councilmember
- Jim Graham, incumbent Ward 1 Councilmember
- Phil Mendelson, incumbent Democratic At-large Councilmember

2008 Council of the District of Columbia At-large Republican primary
| Party | Candidate | Votes | % |
|---|---|---|---|
| Republican | Patrick Mara | 2,370 | 58.74% |
| Republican | Carol Schwartz (inc.) | 1,646 | 40.79% |
| Write-in | | 19 | 0.47% |
| Total votes | | 4,035 | 100% |

=== Statehood Green primary ===
Candidates

- David Schwartzman, geologist

Endorsements

David Schwartzman

Organizations

- Sierra Club

2008 Council of the District of Columbia At-large Statehood Green primary
| Party | Candidate | Votes | % |
|---|---|---|---|
| DC Statehood Green | David Schwartzman | 178 | 87.68% |
| Write-in | | 25 | 12.32% |
| Total votes | | 203 | 100% |

=== Independents ===
Candidates

- Michael A. Brown, lobbyist
- Dee Hunter, community activist
- Mark H. Long, music distributor

Withdrawn

- Adam Clampitt

Endorsements

Michael A. Brown

Local officials

- Yvette Alexander, incumbent Ward 7 Councilmember
- Marion Barry, incumbent Ward 8 Councilmember
- Vincent Gray, incumbent Council Chair
- William Lightfoot, former Independent At-large Councilmember (1989-1997)
- Jim Nathanson, former Ward 3 Councilmember (1987-1995)
- Harry Thomas Jr., incumbent Ward 5 Councilmember

=== General election ===
2008 Council of the District of Columbia At-large election
| Party | Candidate | Votes | % |
|---|---|---|---|
| Democratic | Kwame Brown (inc.) | 172,272 | 47.66% |
| Independent | Michael A. Brown | 71,720 | 19.84% |
| Republican | Patrick Mara | 37,447 | 10.36% |
| DC Statehood Green | David Schwartzman | 18,596 | 5.14% |
| Independent | Mark H. Long | 14,603 | 4.04% |
| Independent | Dee Hunter | 7,311 | 2.02% |
| Write-in | | 39,493 | 10.93% |
| Total votes | | 361,442 | 100% |

== Ward 2 ==
2008 Council of the District of Columbia Ward 2 election
- November 4, 2008
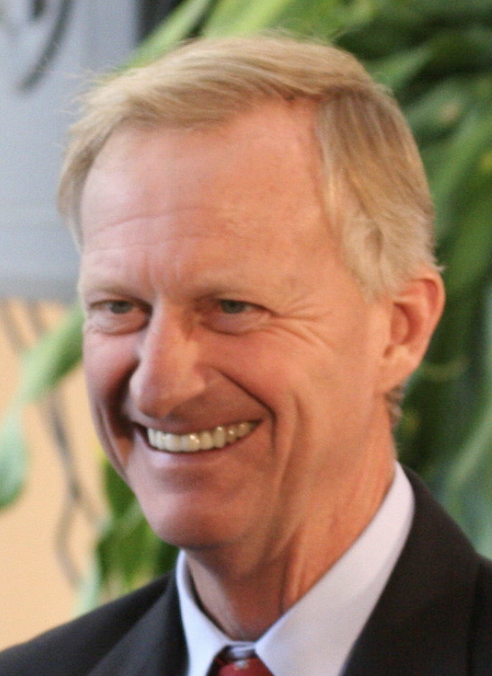

| Nominee | Jack Evans | Christina Erland Culver |
| Party | Democratic | Republican |
| Popular vote | 21,605 | 4,579 |
| Percentage | 81.78% | 17.33% |
Councilmember before election
Jack Evans
Democratic
Elected Councilmember
Jack Evans
Democratic

Incumbent councilmember Jack Evans beat Republican challenger Christina Erland Culver to win re-election to his fifth full term on the Council.

=== Democratic primary ===
Candidates

- Jack Evans, incumbent Ward 2 Councilmember
- Carey Silverman, president of the Mount Vernon Square Neighborhood Association

Endorsements

Jack Evans

Local officials

- Adrian Fenty, incumbent Mayor of the District of Columbia
- Vincent Gray, incumbent Council Chair

Organizations

- Sierra Club

Publications

- The Washington Post

2008 Council of the District of Columbia Ward 2 Democratic primary
| Party | Candidate | Votes | % |
|---|---|---|---|
| Democratic | Jack Evans (inc.) | 3,175 | 64.40% |
| Democratic | Carey Silverman | 1,741 | 35.31% |
| Write-in | | 14 | 0.28% |
| Total votes | | 4,930 | 100% |

=== Republican primary ===
Candidates

- Christina Erland Culver, vice president of Dutko Worldwide

2008 Council of the District of Columbia Ward 2 Republican primary
| Party | Candidate | Votes | % |
|---|---|---|---|
| Republican | Christina Erland Culver | 524 | 90.81% |
| Write-in | | 53 | 9.19% |
| Total votes | | 577 | 100% |

=== General election ===
2008 Council of the District of Columbia Ward 2 election
| Party | Candidate | Votes | % |
|---|---|---|---|
| Democratic | Jack Evans (inc.) | 21,607 | 81.78% |
| Republican | Christina Erland Culver | 4,579 | 17.33% |
| Write-in | | 235 | 0.89% |
| Total votes | | 26,419 | 100% |

== Ward 4 ==
2008 Council of the District of Columbia Ward 4 election
- November 4, 2008
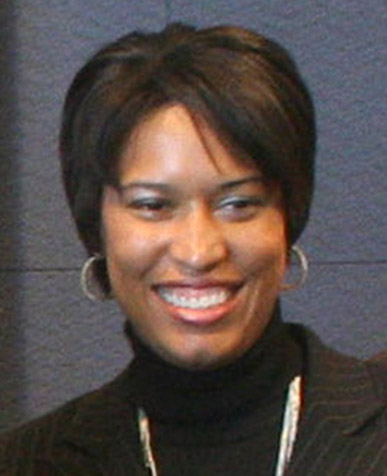
| Nominee | Muriel Bowser |
| Party | Democratic |
| Popular vote | 30,888 |
| Percentage | 97.06% |
Councilmember before election
Muriel Bowser
Democratic
Elected Councilmember
Muriel Bowser
Democratic

Incumbent Muriel Bowser won re-election to her first full term in office following her victory in the 2007 special election.

=== Democratic primary ===
Candidates

- Muriel Bowser, incumbent Ward 4 Councilmember
- Baruti Jahi, former president of the Shepherd Park Civic Association
- Malik F. Mendenhall-Johnson, youth advocate
- Paul E. Montague, former Advisory Neighborhood Commissioner who had been recalled

Endorsements

Muriel Bowser

Labor unions

- International Association of Fire Fighters local 36

Local officals

- Vincent Gray, incumbent Council Chair

Organizations

- Capital Stonewall Democrats
- Sierra Club

Publications

- The Washington Post

2008 Council of the District of Columbia Ward 4 Democratic primary
| Party | Candidate | Votes | % |
|---|---|---|---|
| Democratic | Muriel Bowser (inc.) | 7,132 | 74.85% |
| Democratic | Baruti Jahi | 1,800 | 18.89% |
| Democratic | Paul E. Montague | 302 | 3.17% |
| Democratic | Malik F. Mendenhall-Johnson | 236 | 2.48% |
| Write-in | | 58 | 0.61% |
| Total votes | | 9,528 | 100% |

=== General Election ===
2008 Council of the District of Columbia Ward 4 election
| Party | Candidate | Votes | % |
|---|---|---|---|
| Democratic | Muriel Bowser (inc.) | 30,888 | 97.06% |
| Write-in | | 936 | 2.94% |
| Total votes | | 31,824 | 100% |

== Ward 7 ==
2008 Council of the District of Columbia Ward 7 election
- November 4, 2008
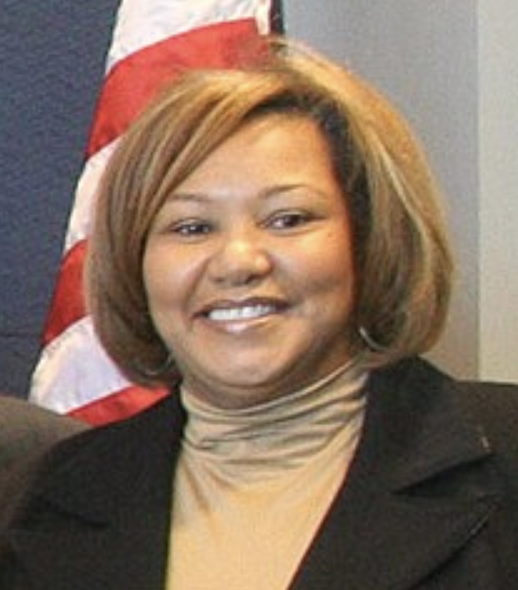

| Nominee | Yvette Alexander | Jimmy Johnson |
| Party | Democratic | Independent |
| Popular vote | 29,140 | 2,434 |
| Percentage | 91.37% | 7.63% |
Councilmember before election
Yvette Alexander
Democratic
Elected Councilmember
Yvette Alexander
Democratic

Incumbent Yvette Alexander won re-election to her first full term in office following her victory in the 2007 special election.

=== Democratic primary ===
Candidates

- Yvette Alexander, incumbent Ward 7 Councilmember
- John Campbell, barber
- Villareal Johnson, organizational development consultant
- Robin Hammond Marlin, sanitarian

Endorsements

Yvette Alexander

Local officials

- Vincent Gray, incumbent Council Chairman

Publications

- The Washington Post

2008 Council of the District of Columbia Ward 7 Democratic primary
| Party | Candidate | Votes | % |
|---|---|---|---|
| Democratic | Yvette Alexander (inc.) | 4,486 | 66.28% |
| Democratic | Robin Hammond Marlin | 1,539 | 22.74% |
| Democratic | Villareal Johnson | 503 | 7.43% |
| Democratic | John Campbell | 220 | 3.25% |
| Write-in | | 20 | 0.30% |
| Total votes | | 6,768 | 100% |

=== Independents ===
Candidates

- Jimmy Johnson, government service employee

=== General Election ===
2008 Council of the District of Columbia Ward 7 election
| Party | Candidate | Votes | % |
|---|---|---|---|
| Democratic | Yvette Alexander (inc.) | 29,140 | 91.37% |
| Independent | Jimmy Johnson | 2,434 | 7.63% |
| Write-in | | 318 | 1.00% |
| Total votes | | 31,892 | 100% |

== Ward 8 ==
2008 Council of the District of Columbia Ward 8 election
- November 4, 2008
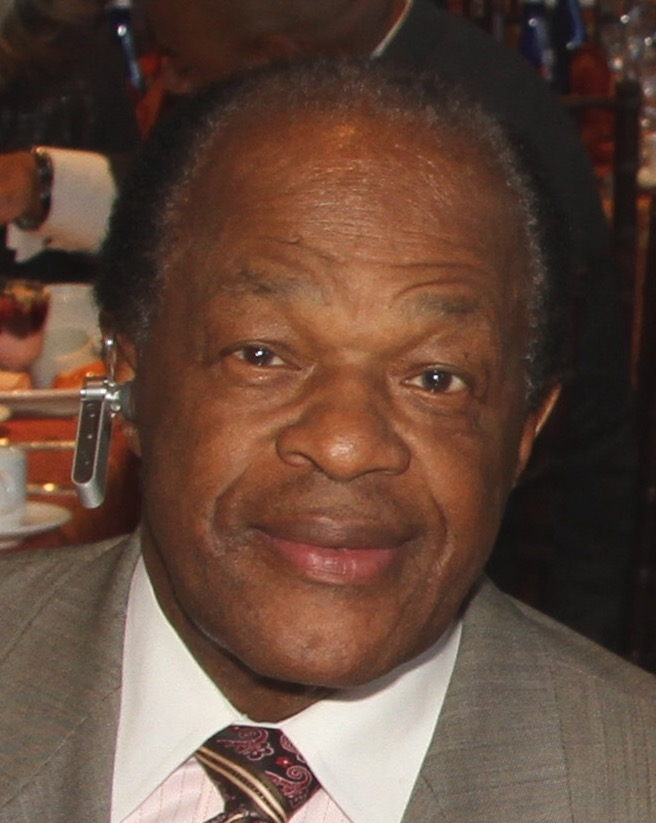

| Nominee | Marion Barry | Darrell Danny Gaston | Yavocka Young |
| Party | Democratic | Independent | Independent |
| Popular vote | 24,524 | 1,137 | 1,010 |
| Percentage | 91.58% | 4.25% | 3.77% |
Councilmember before election
Marion Barry
Democratic
Elected Councilmember
Marion Barry
Democratic

Incumbent and former Mayor Marion Barry won re-election to his second term as Ward 8 Councilmember.

=== Democratic primary ===
During the petitioning phase of the primary, candidate Sandra Seegars challenged the validity of the signatures on the petitions of four candidates, with three withdrawing from the Democratic primary and two of those eventually appearing on the ballot as independent candidates.

Candidates

- Marion Barry, incumbent Ward 8 Councilmember
- Ahmad Braxton-Jones
- Howard Brown
- Sandra Seegars, former DC Taxicab commissioner
- Charles Wilson, community activist

Withdrawn

- Darrell Gaston
- Chanda McMahan
- Yavocka Young

Endorsements

Marion Barry

Organizations

- Capital Stonewall Democrats
- Sierra Club
Charles Wilson

Publications

- The Washington Post

2008 Council of the District of Columbia Ward 8 Democratic primary
| Party | Candidate | Votes | % |
|---|---|---|---|
| Democratic | Marion Barry (inc.) | 4,359 | 77.45% |
| Democratic | Charles Wilson | 2,137 | 11.05% |
| Democratic | Sandra Seegars | 498 | 8.85% |
| Democratic | Howard Brown | 67 | 1.19% |
| Democratic | Ahmad Braxton-Jones | 31 | 0.55% |
| Write-in | | 51 | 0.91% |
| Total votes | | 5,628 | 100% |

=== Independents ===
Candidates

- Darrell Gaston, Advisory Neighborhood Commissioner
- Yavocka Young

Endorsements

Yavocka Young

Publications

- Washington City Paper

=== General Election ===
2008 Council of the District of Columbia Ward 8 election
| Party | Candidate | Votes | % |
|---|---|---|---|
| Democratic | Marion Barry (inc.) | 24,524 | 91.58% |
| Independent | Darrell Gaston | 1,137 | 4.25% |
| Independent | Yavocka Young | 1,010 | 3.77% |
| Write-in | | 108 | 0.40% |
| Total votes | | 26,779 | 100% |
