= 2007 Council of the District of Columbia special election =

US election

- May 1, 2007

2 of the 13 seats in the Council of the District of Columbia 7 seats needed for a majority
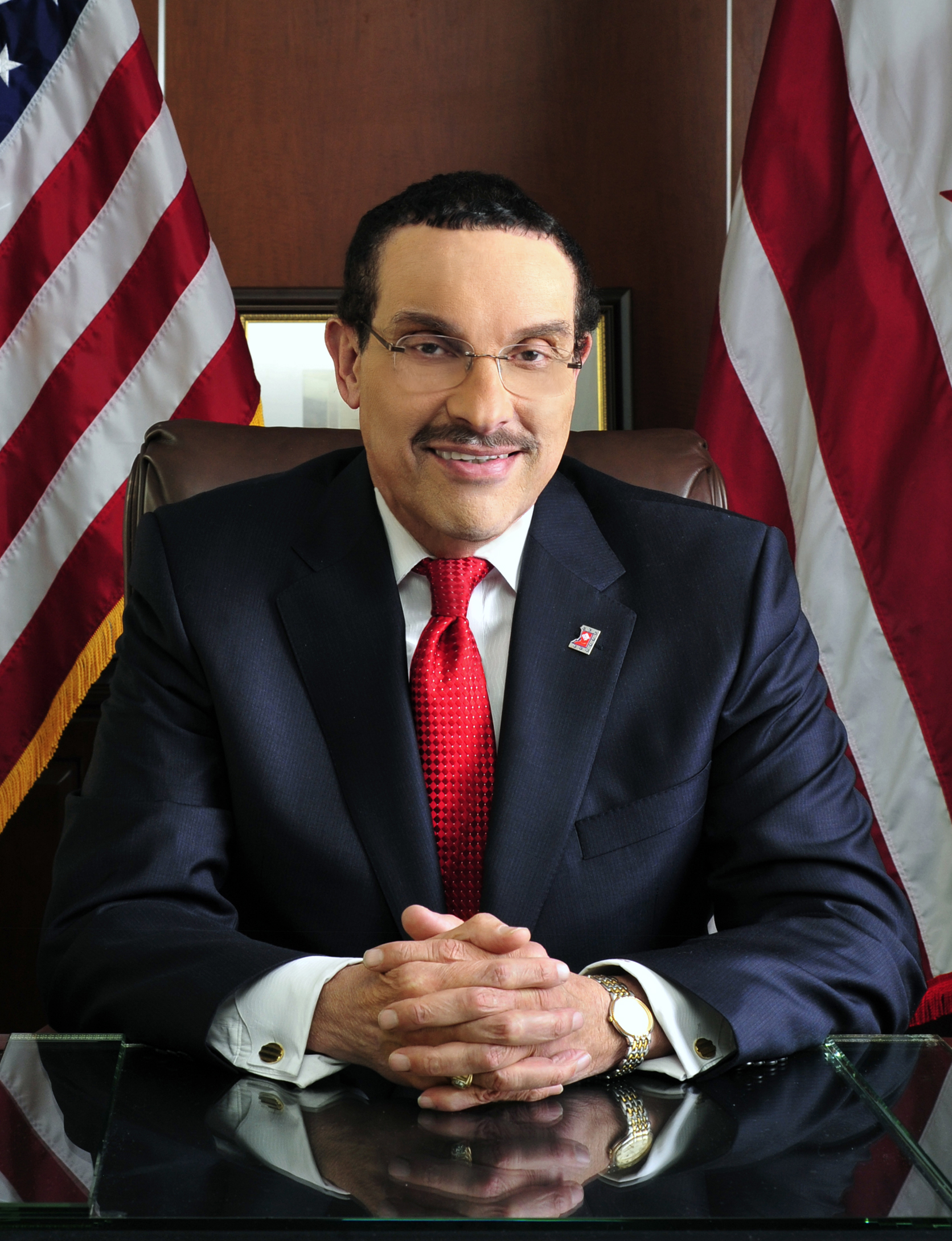

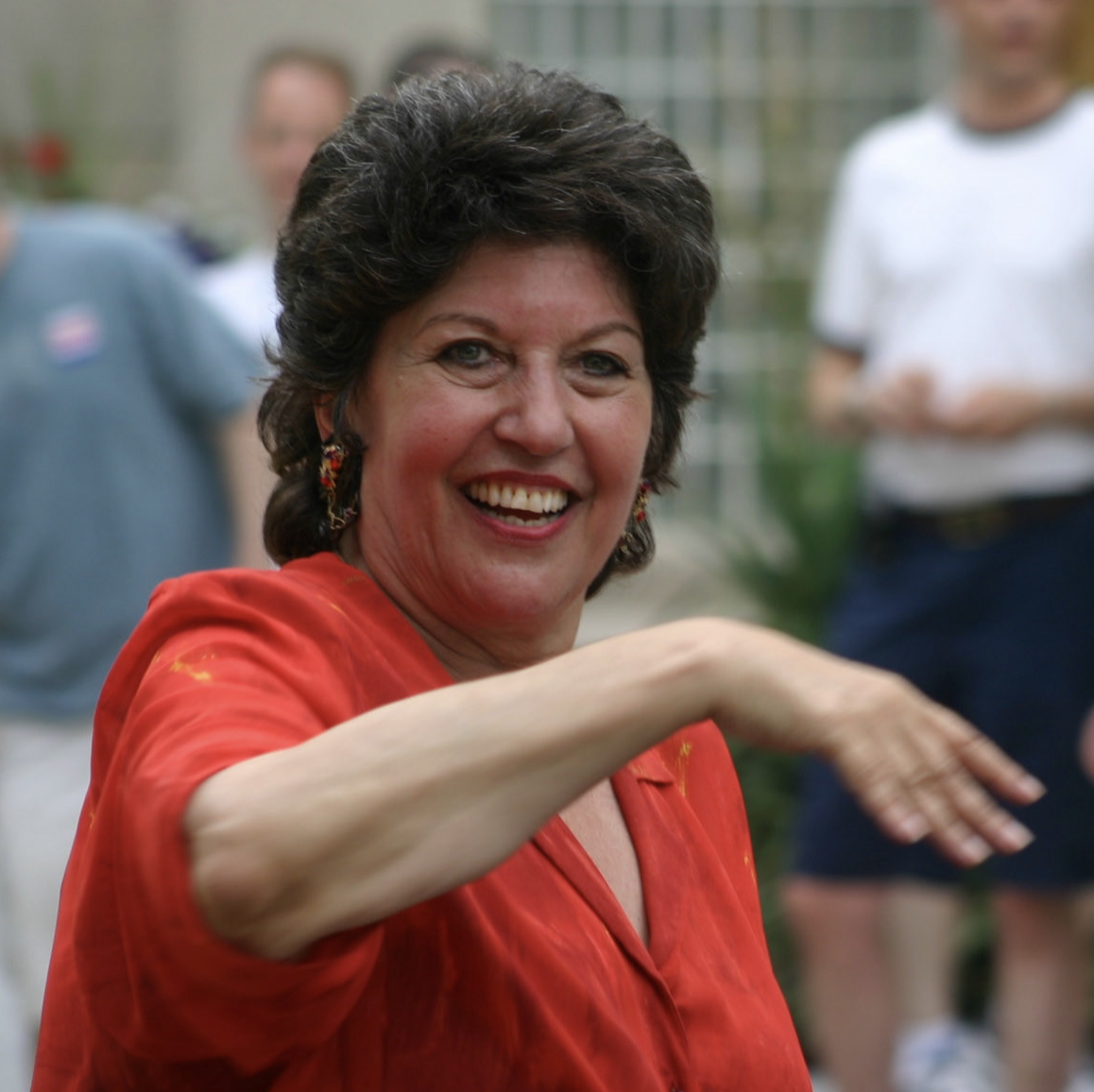

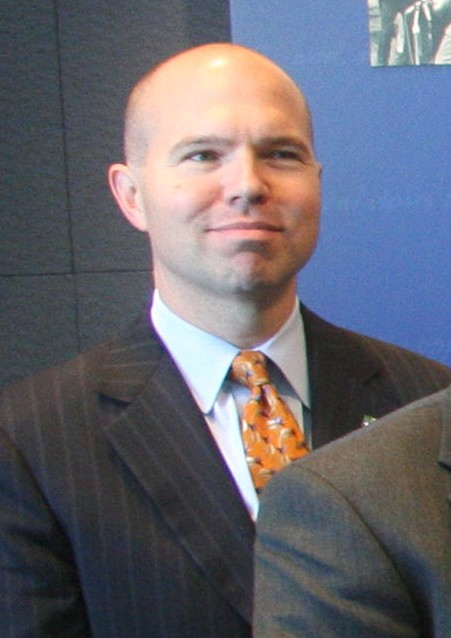
	Majority party	Minority party	Third party
Leader	Vincent Gray	Carol Schwartz	David Catania
Party	Democratic	Republican	Independent
Seats before	11	1	1
Seats after	11	1	1
Seat change	Steady	Steady	Steady

The 2007 Council of the District of Columbia special election was held on May 1 to elect new members to the then-vacated positions of Ward 4 and 7 Councilmembers. All candidates, regardless of party affiliation, appear on one ballot for a special election in the District of Columbia. The individual who receives a plurality of votes is the winning candidate.

== Ward 4 ==
2007 Council of the District of Columbia Ward 4 special election
- May 1, 2007
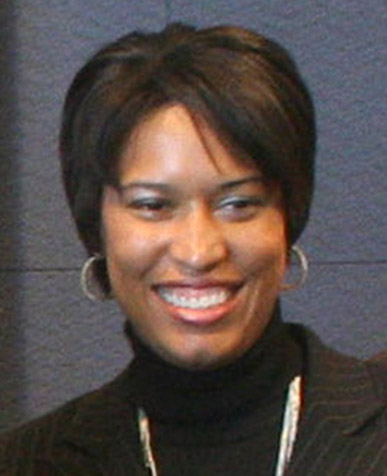

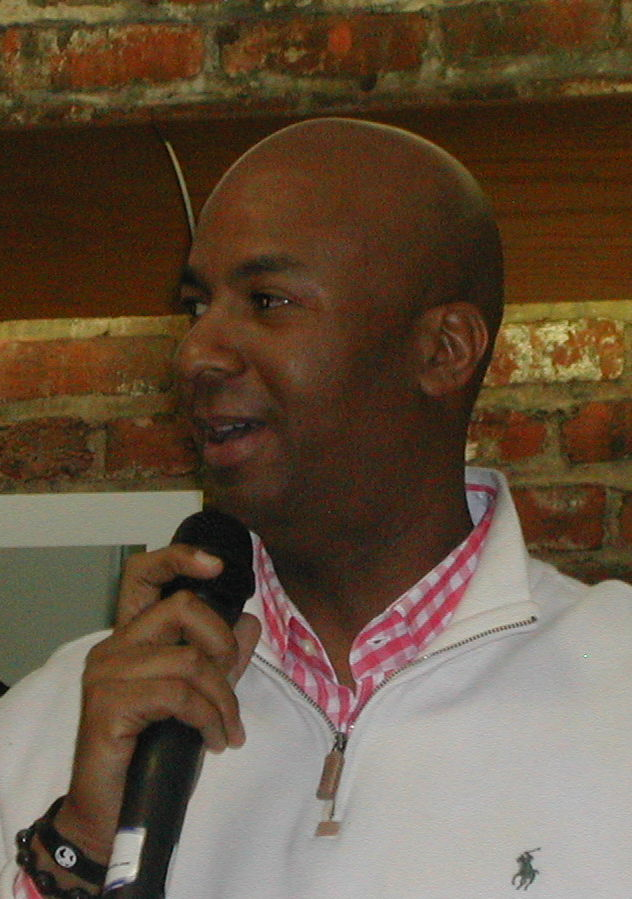

Nominee	Muriel Bowser	Michael A. Brown	Charles Gaither
Party	Democratic	Democratic	Democratic
Popular vote	5,064	3,433	683
Percentage	40.30%	27.32%	5.43%
Nominee	Dwight E. Singleton	Renee Bowser	Graylan Scott Hagler
Party	Democratic	DC Statehood Green	Democratic
Popular vote	602	583	468
Percentage	4.79%	4.64%	3.72%
Councilmember before election
Vacant
Elected Councilmember
Muriel Bowser
Democratic

Incumbent Ward 4 councilmember Adrian Fenty had won election to Mayor of the District of Columbia in the 2006 election, leaving the Ward 4 seat on the Council vacant. A deluge of prospective candidates applied for the May 1 special election, 19 in total, with future mayor Muriel Bowser ultimately winning the seat.

=== Candidates ===
- Lisa P. Bass, communications consultant
- Muriel Bowser, Montgomery County administrator
- Renee Bowser, union lawyer
- Lisa Comfort Bradford, college reunion officer
- Michael A. Brown, lobbyist
- Robert G. Childs, pastor
- James Clark
- Marlena D. Edwards, nonprofit executive
- Charles Gaither, government relations consultant
- Carroll Green
- Michael T. Green, nonprofit executive
- Graylan Scott Hagler, activist and minister
- Roy Howell, lawyer
- Judi Jones, teacher
- Artee Milligan, nonprofit executive
- Dwight E. Singleton, former member of the District of Columbia Board of Education
- Douglass Ned Sloan, consultant
- Tony Towns, lawyer
- T. A. Uqdah, businessowner

Endorsements

Muriel Bowser

Labor unions

- AFL-CIO Metropolitan Washington Council
- Metropolitan Police Department Fraternal Order of Police
- International Association of Fire Fighters local 36
- SEIU Maryland/DC State Council

Local officials

- Adrian Fenty, incumbent Mayor of the District of Columbia and former Ward 4 Councilmember (2001-2007)

Publications

- The Washington Post
Renee Bowser

Labor unions

- United Food and Commercial Workers local 400

Local officials

- Hilda Mason, former Statehood party At-Large Councilmember (1977-1999)
Michael A. Brown

Individuals

- Robert L. Johnson, co-founder of Black Entertainment Television

Organizations

- Capital Stonewall Democrats

=== Special election ===
2007 Council of the District of Columbia Ward 4 special election
Party	Candidate	Votes	%
Democratic	Muriel Bowser	5,064	40.30%
Democratic	Michael A. Brown	3,433	27.32%
Democratic	Charles Gaither	683	5.43%
Democratic	Douglass Ned Sloan	602	4.79%
DC Statehood Green	Renee Bowser	583	4.64%
Democratic	Graylan Scott Hagler	468	3.72%
Democratic	Tony Towns	390	3.10%
Democratic	Robert G. Childs	339	2.70%
Democratic	Artee Milligan	170	1.35%
Independent	Judi Jones	154	1.23%
Democratic	Lisa P. Bass	110	0.93%
Democratic	Douglass Ned Sloan	98	0.78%
Democratic	Marlena D. Edwards	97	0.77%
Democratic	T.A. Uqdah	82	0.65%
Democratic	Lisa Comfort Bradford	72	0.57%
Democratic	Michael T. Green	49	0.39%
Democratic	Dwight E. Singleton	29	0.23%
Democratic	James Clark	17	0.14%
Democratic	Roy Howell	10	0.08%
Write-in		29	0.23%
Total votes		12,567	100%

== Ward 7 ==
2007 Council of the District of Columbia Ward 7 special election
- May 1, 2007
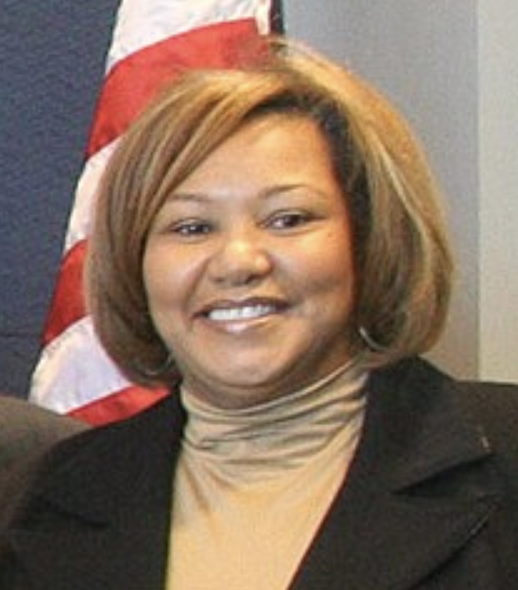

Nominee	Yvette Alexander	Victor Vandell	Johnnie Scott Rice
Party	Democratic	Democratic	Independent
Popular vote	2,535	923	782
Percentage	34.07%	12.40%	10.51%
Nominee	Greg Rhett	Mark H. Long	Emily Y. Washington
Party	Democratic	Democratic	Democratic
Popular vote	594	588	386
Percentage	7.98%	7.90%	5.19%
Councilmember before election
Vacant
Elected Councilmember
Yvette Alexander
Democratic

Incumbent Ward 7 Councilmember Vincent Gray won election to Council Chairman in the 2006 Council election, leaving the Ward 7 seat vacant. 18 candidates eventually filed for the special election, with Democrat Yvette Alexander winning.

=== Candidates ===
- Kirk Adair
- Yvette Alexander
- Dorothy Douglas
- D. L. Humphrey
- Roscoe Grant Jr.
- Jimmy Johnson
- Sam Jordan
- Mark H. Long
- Cleve Mesidor
- Mona Odom
- Greg Rhett
- Eddie Rhodes
- Johnnie Scott Rice
- Julie Rones
- Christine M. Tolson
- Iris Toyer
- Victor Vandell
- Emily Y. Washington

Withdrawn

- Carrie Thornhill

Endorsements

Yvette Alexander

Local officials

- Vincent Gray, incumbent Council Chairman and former Ward 7 Councilmember (2005-2007)
- Kwame R. Brown, incumbent Democratic At-large Councilmember
- H. R. Crawford, former Ward 7 Councilmember (1981-1993)

Organizations

- Capital Stonewall Democrats
Victor Vandell

Publications

- The Washington Post

Debates

Debates and forums for At-large candidates
Date	Place	Host	Participants																	
P Participant. I Invitee. A Absent. N Confirmed non-invitee. O Out of race (exploring, suspended, or not yet entered)			Adair	Alexander	Douglas	Humphrey	Grant Jr.	Johnson	Jordan	Long	Mesidor	Odom	Rhett	Rhodes	Rice	Rones	Tolson	Toyer	Vandell	Washington
14 April 2007	Ward Memorial AME Church	Hillcrest Civic Association	P	P	P	P	P	P	P	P	P	P	P	P	P	P	P	P	P	P

=== Special election ===
2007 Council of the District of Columbia Ward 7 special election
Party	Candidate	Votes	%
Democratic	Yvette Alexander	2,535	34.07%
Democratic	Victor Vandell	923	12.40%
Independent	Johnnie Scott Rice	683	5.43%
Democratic	Greg Rhett	594	7.98%
Democratic	Mark H. Long	588	7.90%
Democratic	Emily Y. Washington	386	5.19%
Democratic	Roscoe Grant Jr.	367	4.93%
Democratic	Eddie Rhodes	283	3.80%
Democratic	Julie Rones	217	2.92%
Democratic	Cleve Mesidor	172	2.31%
Democratic	Iris Toyer	154	2.07%
Independent	Sam Jordan	121	1.63%
Democratic	D. L. Humphrey	57	0.77%
Democratic	Dorothy Douglas	54	0.73%
Democratic	Kirk Adair	20	0.27%
Independent	Christine M. Tolson	19	0.26%
Democratic	Mona Odom	16	0.22%
Independent	Jimmy Johnson	12	0.16%
Write-in		141	1.89%
Total votes		7,441	100%
