= 2006 Council of the District of Columbia election =

U.S. election

- November 7, 2006

7 seats on the Council of the District of Columbia 7 seats needed for a majority
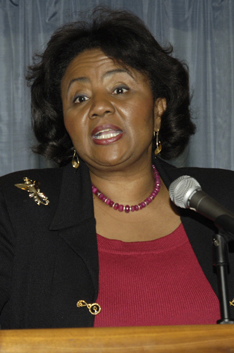

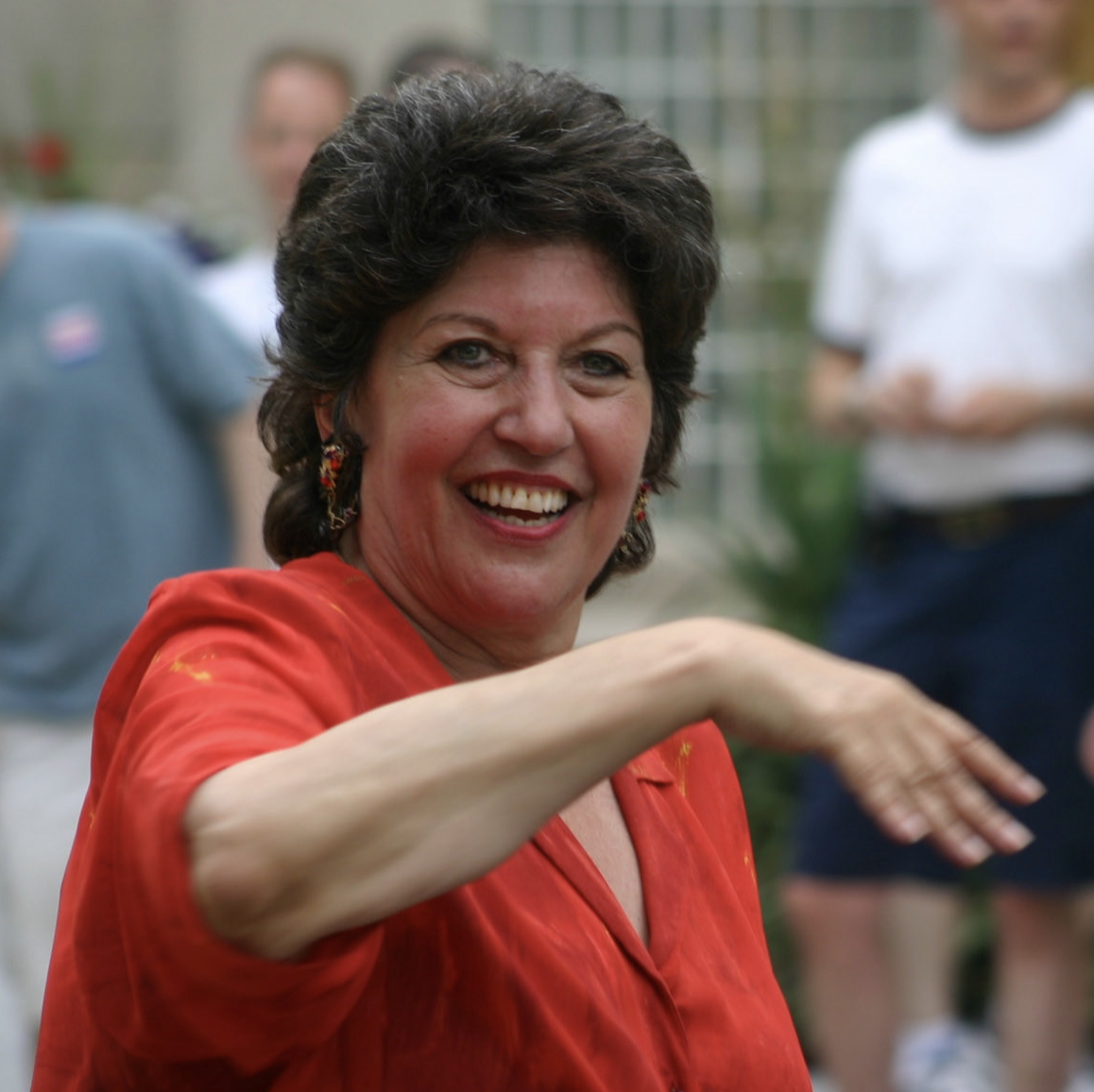

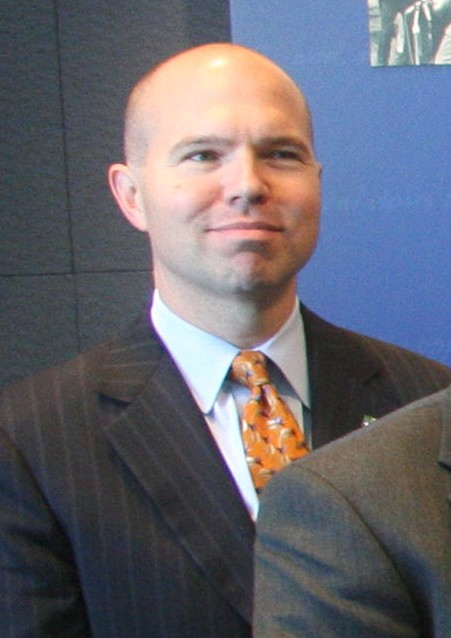
	Majority party	Minority party	Third party
Leader	Linda Cropp	Carol Schwartz	David Catania
Party	Democratic	Republican	Independent
Seats before	11	1	1
Seats after	11	1	1
Seat change	Steady	Steady	Steady

The 2006 Council of the District of Columbia election was held on November 7, with primaries taking place on September 12. There was considerable change in the composition of the Council following the general election, with new members elected to the Chair and in Wards 3, 5, and 6. Additionally, while not directly up for election this cycle, the seats for Ward 4 and Ward 7 were vacated due to Adrian Fenty winning election to Mayor of the District of Columbia and Vincent Gray winning election to Council Chair respectively.

== Summary ==
Democrats remained the largest party on the Council, as they kept their 11 total seats. David Catania won re-election in his first election as an independent rather than a Republican, remaining the only independent on Council.

=== At-large ===
Position	Incumbent				Candidates
Position	Member	Party	First elected	Status	Candidates
Chairperson	Linda Cropp	Democratic	1997 (special)	Incumbent ran for other office. New member elected. Democratic hold.	▌ ✓ Vincent Gray 97.8%
At-large	David Catania	Republican	1997 (special)	Incumbent re-elected.	▌ ✓ Phil Mendelson 50.6%; ▌ ✓ David Catania 32.5%; ▌ Ann C. Wilcox 6.9%; ▌ Tony Dominguez 4.9%; ▌ Marcus Skelton 4.6%
At-large	Phil Mendelson	Democratic	1998	Incumbent re-elected.	▌ ✓ Phil Mendelson 50.6%; ▌ ✓ David Catania 32.5%; ▌ Ann C. Wilcox 6.9%; ▌ Tony Dominguez 4.9%; ▌ Marcus Skelton 4.6%

=== Wards ===
Position	Incumbent				Candidates
Position	Member	Party	First elected	Status	Candidates
Ward 1	Jim Graham	Democratic	1998	Incumbent re-elected.	▌ ✓ Jim Graham 97.2%
Ward 3	Kathleen Patterson	Democratic	1994	Incumbent ran for other office. New member elected. Democratic hold.	▌ ✓ Mary Cheh 71.5%; ▌ Theresa Conroy 27.8%
Ward 5	Vincent Orange	Democratic	1998	Incumbent ran for other office. New member elected. Democratic hold.	▌ ✓ Harry Thomas Jr. 85.2%; ▌ Carolyn C. Steptoe 7.9%; ▌ Miriam Moore 4.1%; ▌ Tontalya T. Wright 1.7%
Ward 6	Sharon Ambrose	Democratic	1997 (special)	Incumbent retired. New member elected. Democratic hold.	▌ ✓ Tommy Wells 61.2%; ▌ Will Cobb 27.5%; ▌ 10.9%

== Chairperson ==
2006 Council of the District of Columbia Chairperson election
- November 7, 2006
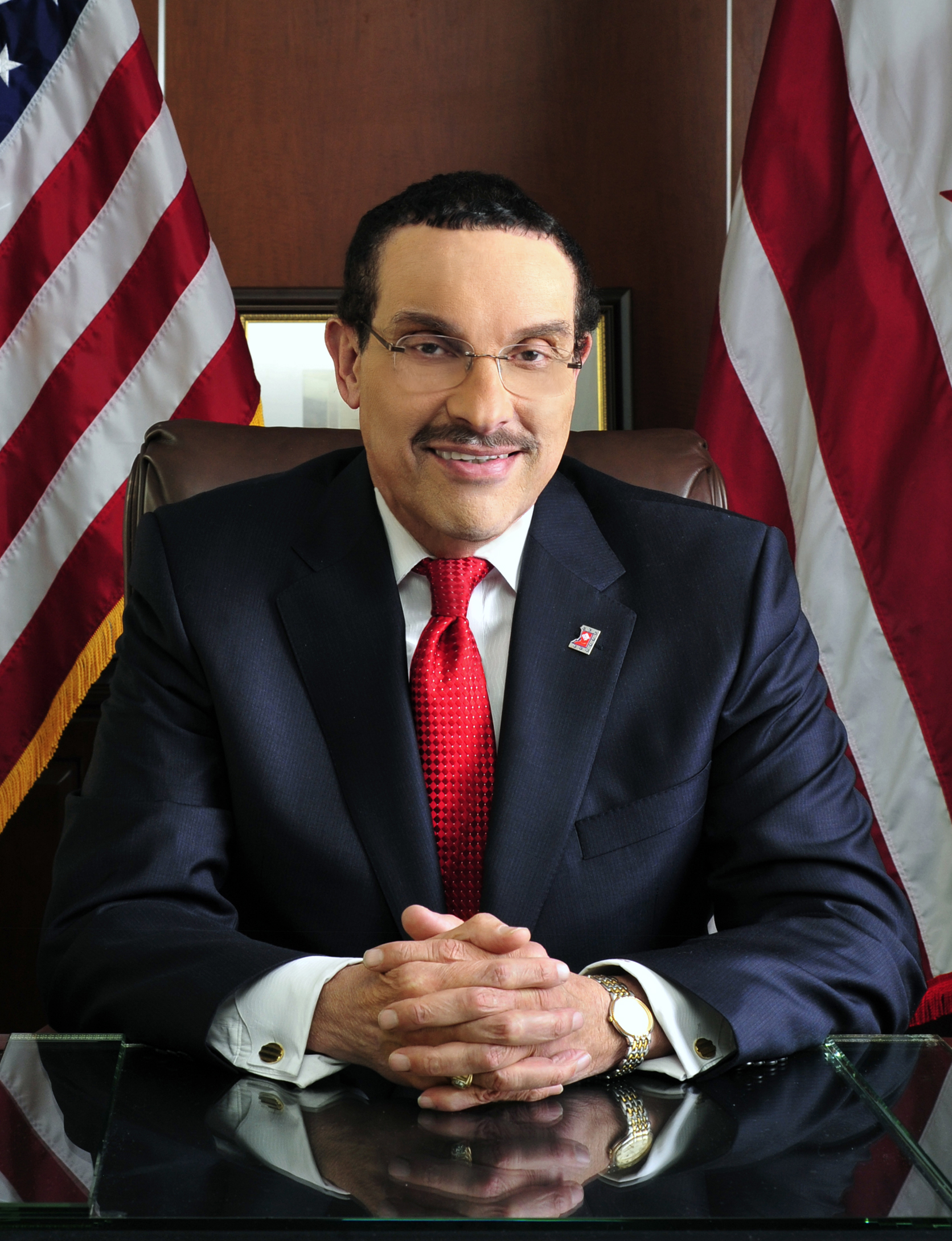
Nominee	Vincent Gray
Party	Democratic
Popular vote	107,249
Percentage	97.78%
Chairperson before election
Linda Cropp
Democratic
Elected Chairperson
Vincent Gray
Democratic

Incumbent chairwoman Linda Cropp declined to run for office again in favor of pursuing a mayoral bid, finishing second in the Democratic primary. Ward 7 Councilmember Vincent Gray beat Ward 3 Councilmember Kathleen Patterson in the Democratic primary for Chair, winning an uncontested general election easily.

=== Democratic primary ===
Candidates

- Vincent Gray, incumbent Ward 7 Councilmember
- Kathleen Patterson, incumbent Ward 3 Councilmember

Endorsements

Vincent Gray

Labor unions

- American Federation of Government Employees district 14
- Washington Teachers' Union

Organizations

- Sierra Club

Publications

- The Washington Post
Kathleen Patterson

Labor unions

- American Federation of State, County and Municipal Employees council 20
- SEIU local 32BJ

2006 Council of the District of Columbia Chairperson Democratic primary
Party	Candidate	Votes	%
Democratic	Vincent Gray	58,345	57.06%
Democratic	Kathleen Patterson	43,646	42.68%
Write-in		261	0.26%
Total votes		102,252	100%

=== General election ===
2006 Council of the District of Columbia Chairperson election
Party	Candidate	Votes	%
Democratic	Vincent Gray	107,249	97.78%
Write-in		2,440	2.22%
Total votes		109,689	100%

== At-large ==
2006 Council of the District of Columbia At-large election
- November 7, 2006
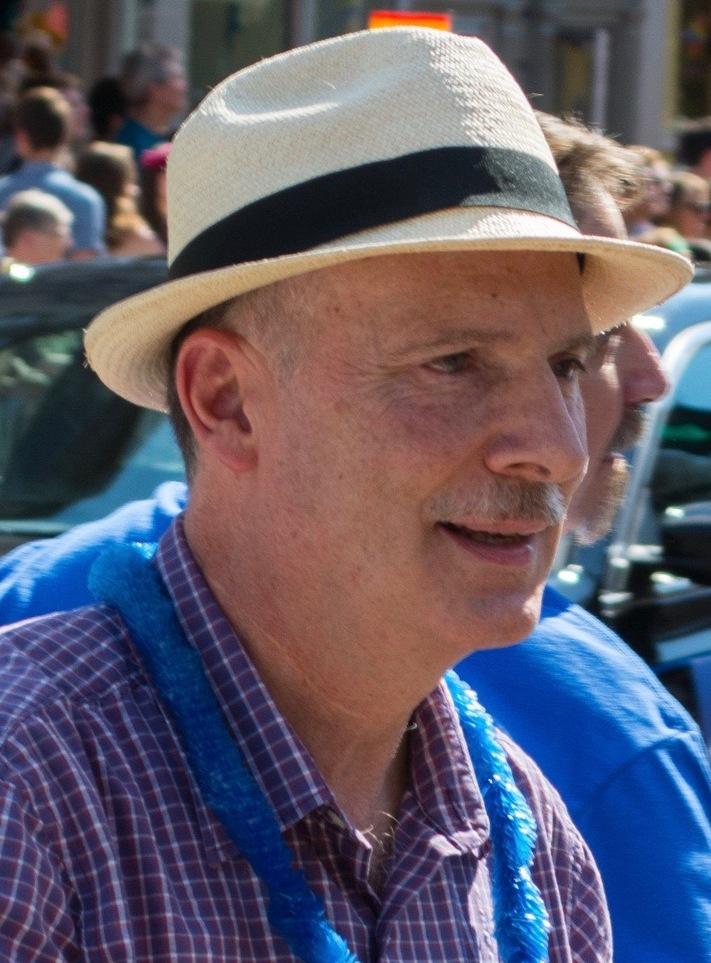

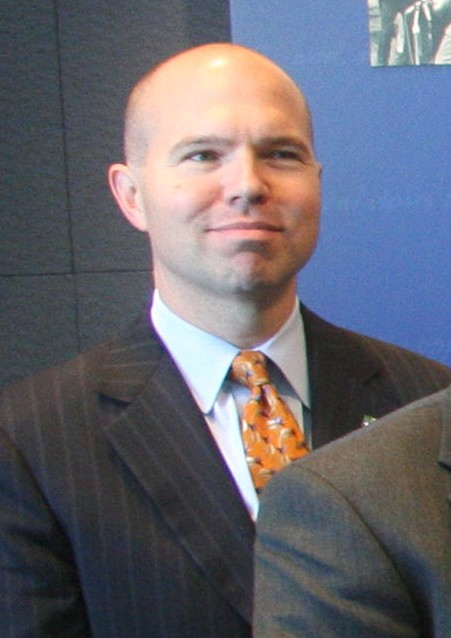

Nominee	Phil Mendelson	David Catania	Ann C. Wilcox
Party	Democratic	Independent	DC Statehood Green
Popular vote	90,599	58,293	12,390
Percentage	50.57%	32.54%	6.92%
Nominee	Tony Dominguez	Marcus Skelton
Party	Independent	Republican
Popular vote	8,759	8,199
Percentage	4.89%	4.58%
Councilmembers before election
David Catania (Rep.)
Phil Mendelson (Dem.)
Elected Councilmembers
David Catania (Rep.)
Phil Mendelson (Dem.)

Republican David Catania and Democrat Phil Mendelson each won election to their third full term.

=== Democratic primary ===
Candidates

- A. Scott Bolden, lawyer
- Phil Mendelson, incumbent At-large Councilmember

Endorsements

Phil Mendelson

Labor unions

- American Federation of Government Employees district 14
- American Federation of State, County and Municipal Employees council 20

Organizations

- Sierra Club

Publications

- The Washington Post

2006 Council of the District of Columbia At-large Democratic primary
Party	Candidate	Votes	%
Democratic	Phil Mendelson (inc.)	62,776	63.58%
Democratic	A. Scott Bolden	35,486	35.94%
Write-in		468	0.47%
Total votes		98,730	100%

=== Republican primary ===
Candidates

- Marcus Skelton

2006 Council of the District of Columbia At-large Republican primary
Party	Candidate	Votes	%
Republican	Marcus Skelton	1,766	87.00%
Write-in		264	13.00%
Total votes		2,030	100%

=== Statehood Green primary ===
Candidates

- Ann C. Wilcox, lawyer

2006 Council of the District of Columbia At-large Statehood Green primary
Party	Candidate	Votes	%
DC Statehood Green	Ann C. Wilcox	375	82.78%
Write-in		78	17.22%
Total votes		453	100%

=== Independents ===
Candidates

- David Catania, incumbent At-large Councilmember
- Tony Dominguez, local government employee

=== General election ===
2006 Council of the District of Columbia At-large election
Party	Candidate	Votes	%
Democratic	Phil Mendelson (inc.)	90,599	50.57%
Independent	David Catania (inc.)	58,293	32.54%
DC Statehood Green	Ann C. Wilcox	12,390	6.92%
Independent	Tony Dominguez	8,759	4.89%
Republican	Marcus Skelton	8,199	4.58%
Write-in		912	0.51%
Total votes		179,152	100%

== Ward 1 ==
2006 Council of the District of Columbia Ward 1 election
- November 7, 2006
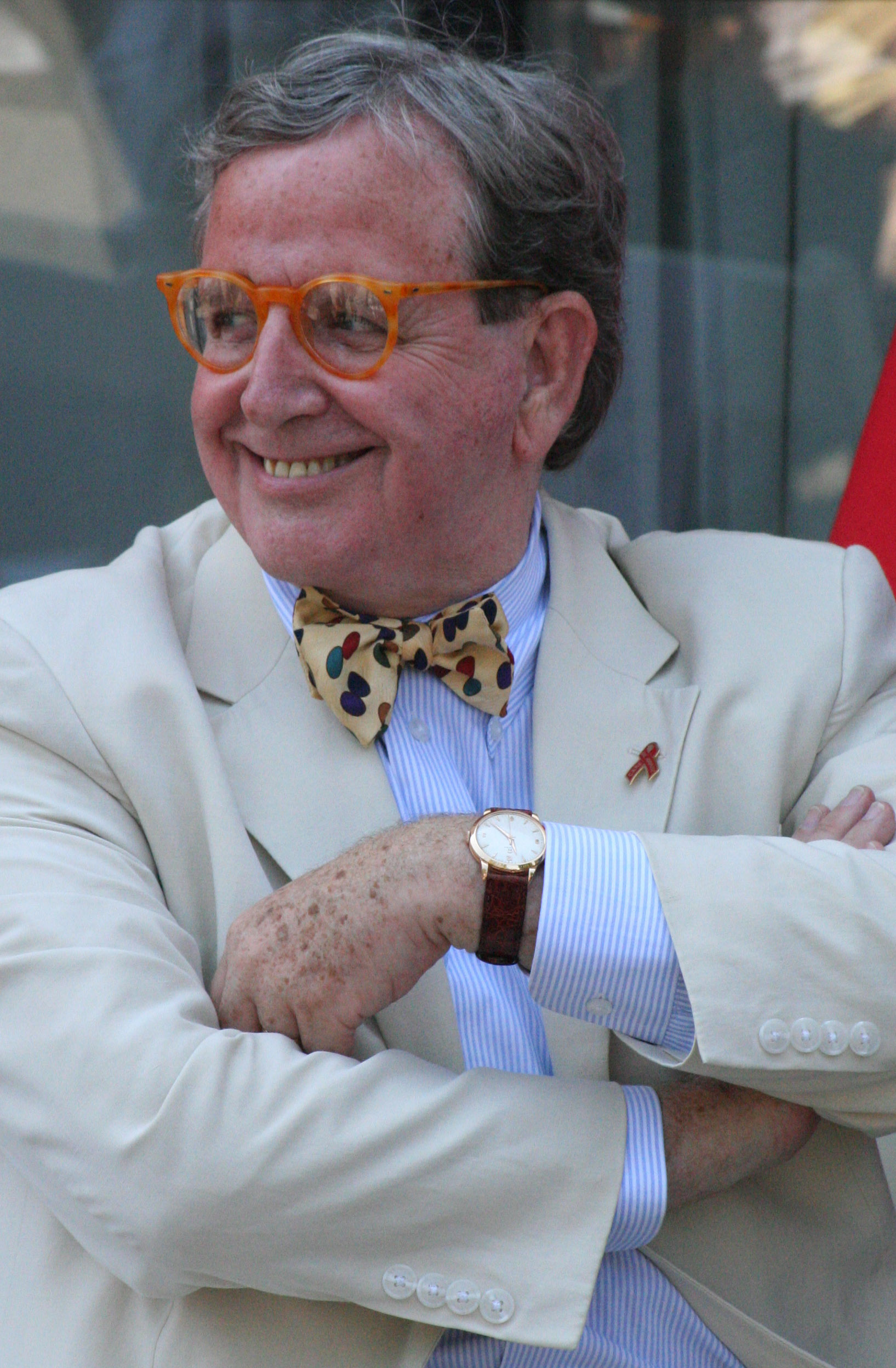
Nominee	Jim Graham
Party	Democratic
Popular vote	11,489
Percentage	97.24%
Councilmember before election
Jim Graham
Democratic
Elected Councilmember
Jim Graham
Democratic

Incumbent Councilmember Jim Graham won re-election to his third full term.

=== Democratic primary ===
Candidates

- Jim Graham, incumbent Ward 1 Councilmember
- Chad Williams, real estate developer

Endorsements

Jim Graham

Labor unions

- American Federation of Government Employees district 14
- American Federation of State, County and Municipal Employees council 20

Organizations

- Sierra Club

Publications

- The Washington Post

2006 Council of the District of Columbia Ward 1 Democratic primary
Party	Candidate	Votes	%
Democratic	Jim Graham (inc.)	9,028	86.32%
Democratic	Chad Williams	1,361	13.01%
Write-in		70	0.67%
Total votes		10,459	100%

=== General Election ===
2006 Council of the District of Columbia Ward 1 election
Party	Candidate	Votes	%
Democratic	Jim Graham (inc.)	11,489	97.24%
Write-in		326	2.76%
Total votes		11,815	100%

== Ward 3 ==
2006 Council of the District of Columbia Ward 3 election
- November 7, 2006
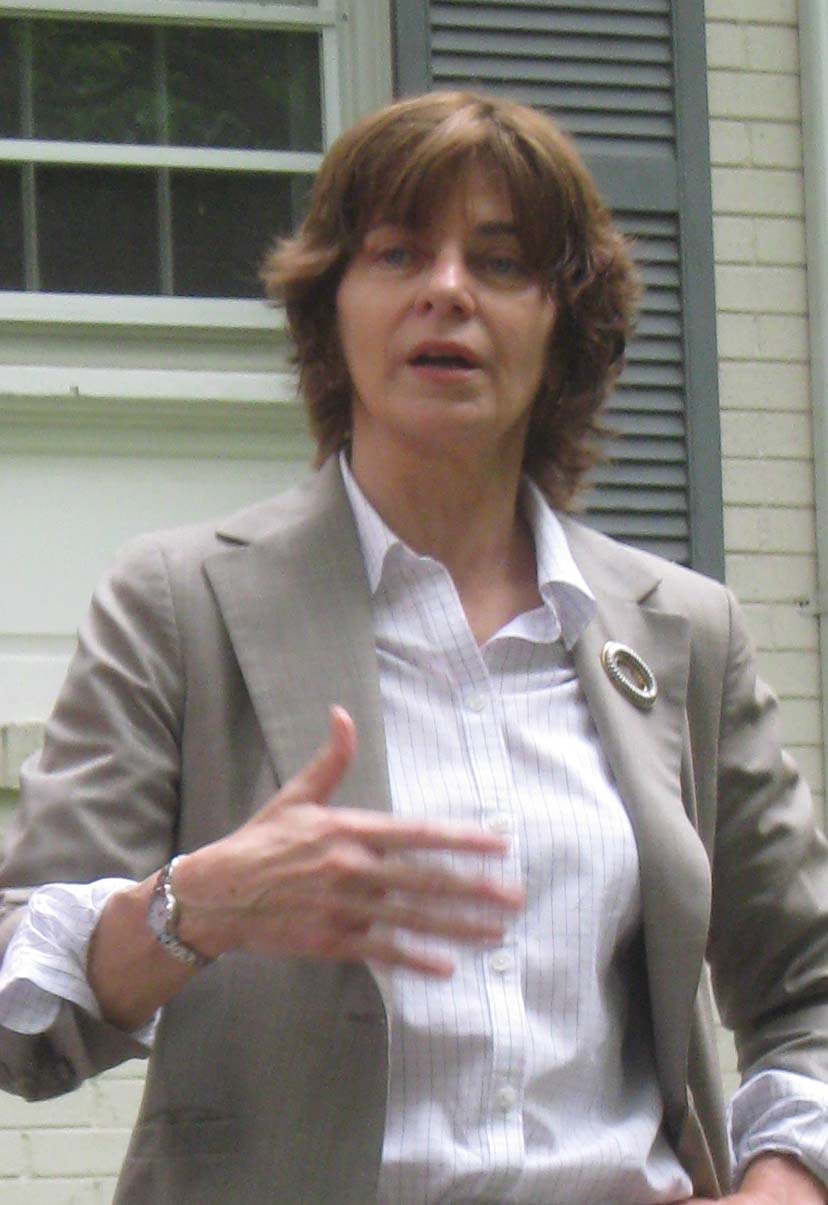

Nominee	Mary Cheh	Theresa Conroy
Party	Democratic	Republican
Popular vote	13,881	5,403
Percentage	71.47%	27.82%
Councilmember before election
Kathleen Patterson
Democratic
Elected Councilmember
Mary Cheh
Democratic

Incumbent Ward 3 Councilmember Kathleen Patterson declined to run for re-election in order to campaign for Chair of the Council, for which she ultimately lost in the Democratic primary. Mary Cheh won a crowded primary field, handily beating Republican challenger Theresa Conroy in the general election.

=== Democratic primary ===
Candidates

- Sam Brooks, political consultant
- Mary Cheh, George Washington University law professor
- Erik Gaull, DC government staffer
- Robert Gordon, international development consultant
- Eric Goulet, former Council finance committee staffer
- Jonathan Rees, healthcare business administrator
- Bill Rice, former District Department of Transportation spokesperson
- Paul Strauss, incumbent District of Columbia Shadow Senator
- Cathy Wiss, Advisory Neighborhood Commission 3F chair

Endorsements

Mary Cheh

Local officials

- Kathleen Patterson, incumbent Ward 3 Councilmember

Organizations

- Sierra Club

Publications

- The Washington Post
Paul Strauss

Organizations

- American Federation of Government Employees district 14

2006 Council of the District of Columbia Ward 3 Democratic primary
Party	Candidate	Votes	%
Democratic	Mary Cheh	6,462	44.28%
Democratic	Paul Strauss	2,110	14.46%
Democratic	Sam Brooks	1,191	8.16%
Democratic	Robert Gordon	1,159	7.94%
Democratic	Cathy Wiss	1,158	7.93%
Democratic	Bill Rice	954	6.54%
Democratic	Eric Goulet	490	3.36%
Democratic	Jonathan Rees	32	0.22%
Write-in		15	0.10%
Total votes		14,594	100%

=== Republican primary ===
Candidates

- Theresa Conroy, medical worker

2006 Council of the District of Columbia Ward 3 Republican primary
Party	Candidate	Votes	%
Republican	Theresa Conroy	577	85.10%
Write-in		101	14.90%
Total votes		678	100%

=== General election ===
2006 Council of the District of Columbia Ward 3 election
Party	Candidate	Votes	%
Democratic	Mary Cheh	13,881	71.47%
Republican	Theresa Conroy	5,403	27.82%
Write-in		139	0.72%
Total votes		19,423	100%

== Ward 5 ==
2006 Council of the District of Columbia Ward 5 election
- November 7, 2006
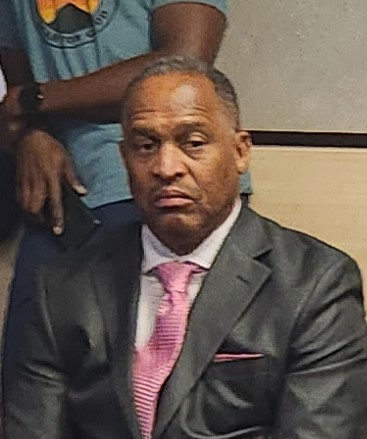

Nominee	Harry Thomas Jr.	Carolyn C. Steptoe
Party	Democratic	DC Statehood Green
Popular vote	13,507	1,254
Percentage	85.22%	7.91%
Nominee	Miriam Moore	Tontalya T. Wright
Party	Independent	Independent
Popular vote	648	267
Percentage	4.09%	1.68%
Councilmember before election
Vincent Orange
Democratic
Elected Councilmember
Harry Thomas Jr.
Democratic

Two-term incumbent Councilmember Vincent Orange declined to run for re-election in order to pursue a bid for Mayor, winning a mere 2.9% in the Democratic primary. Harry Thomas Jr., the son of former Ward 5 Councilmember Harry Thomas Sr., emerged victorious from a crowded field of 11 in the Democratic primary and cleaned up against 3 challengers in the November general election.

=== Democratic primary ===
Candidates

- Joe Harris, executive of the Friendship House association
- Kathy Henderson, Advisory Neighborhood Commissioner
- Regina James, Advisory Neighborhood Commissioner
- Ron L. Magnus, former District of Columbia Assistant Attorney General
- Bruce A. Marshall, lawyer
- Audrey M. Ray, administrative assistant
- Deborah Smith, Advisory Neighborhood Commissioner
- Harry Thomas Jr., son of former Ward 5 Councilmember Harry Thomas Sr.
- Frank Wilds, advertising executive
- Vera Winfield, barbershop owner
- Rae Zapata, former rent administrator

Endorsements

Harry Thomas Jr.

Labor unions

- American Federation of Government Employees district 14
- American Federation of State, County and Municipal Employees council 20

Publications

- The Washington Post

2006 Council of the District of Columbia Ward 5 Democratic primary
Party	Candidate	Votes	%
Democratic	Harry Thomas Jr.	6,027	39.27%
Democratic	Frank Wilds	2,920	19.03%
Democratic	Rae Zapata	1,649	10.75%
Democratic	Bruce A. Marshall	1,491	9.72%
Democratic	Kathy Henderson	714	4.65%
Democratic	Ron L. Magnus	621	4.05%
Democratic	Regina James	547	3.56%
Democratic	Audrey M. Ray	508	3.31%
Democratic	Deborah Smith	373	2.43%
Democratic	Vera Winfield	224	1.46%
Democratic	Joe Harris	212	1.38%
Write-in		60	0.39%
Total votes		15,346	100%

=== Statehood Green primary ===
Candidates

- Philip Blair Jr., consultant
- Carolyn C. Steptoe, paralegal

2006 Council of the District of Columbia Ward 5 Statehood Green primary
Party	Candidate	Votes	%
DC Statehood Green	Carolyn C. Steptoe	40	44.94%
DC Statehood Green	Philip Blair Jr.	33	37.08%
Write-in		16	17.98%
Total votes		89	100%

=== Independents ===
Candidates

- Miriam Moore
- Tontalya T. Wright

=== General election ===
2006 Council of the District of Columbia Ward 5 election
Party	Candidate	Votes	%
Democratic	Harry Thomas Jr.	13,507	85.22%
DC Statehood Green	Carolyn C. Steptoe	1,254	7.91%
Independent	Miriam Moore	648	4.09%
Independent	Tontalya T. Wright	267	1.68%
Write-in		174	1.10%
Total votes		15,850	100%

== Ward 6 ==
2006 Council of the District of Columbia Ward 6 special election
- November 7, 2006
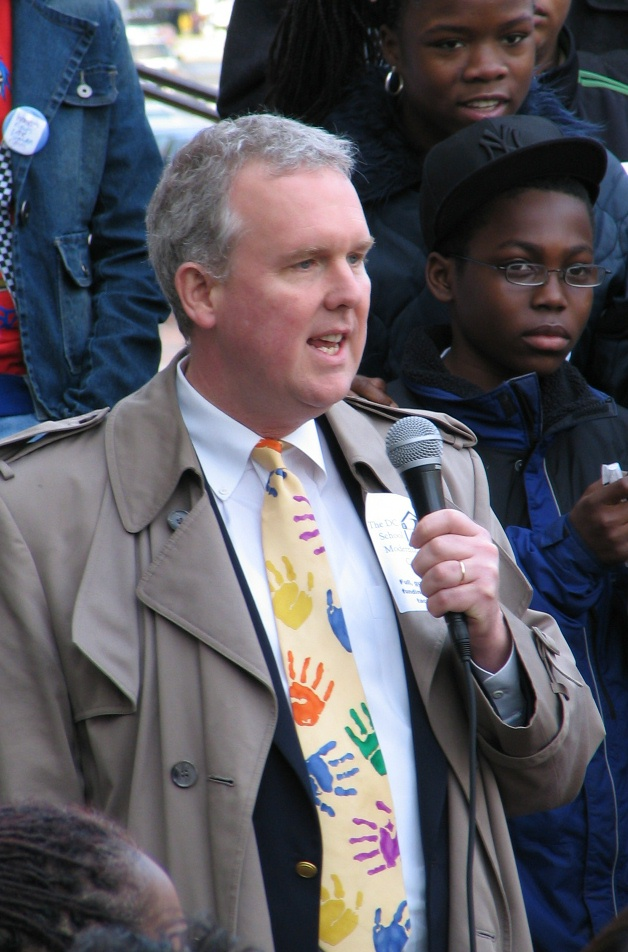

Nominee	Tommy Wells	Will Cobb	Tony Williams
Party	Democratic	Independent	Republican
Popular vote	10,318	4,634	1,839
Percentage	61.23%	27.50%	10.91%
Councilmember before election
Sharon Ambrose
Democratic
Elected Councilmember
Tommy Wells
Democratic

Incumbent Councilmember Sharon Ambrose declined to run for re-election for a third term, instead opting to resign at the end of her term due to her ongoing battle with multiple sclerosis.

=== Democratic primary ===
Candidates

- Curtis L. Etherly Jr., government relations executive
- Leo Pinson, former neighborhood services coordinator
- Tommy Wells, member of the District of Columbia State Board of Education

Endorsements

Tommy Wells

Labor unions

- American Federation of Government Employees district 14
- American Federation of State, County and Municipal Employees council 20

Local officials

- Sharon Ambrose, incumbent Ward 6 Councilmember

Organizations

- Sierra Club

Publications

- The Washington Post

2006 Council of the District of Columbia Ward 6 Democratic primary
Party	Candidate	Votes	%
Democratic	Tommy Wells	8,323	65.09%
Democratic	Curtis L. Etherly Jr.	2,510	19.63%
Democratic	Leo Pinson	1,714	13.41%
Write-in		239	1.87%
Total votes		12,786	100%

=== Republican primary ===
Candidates

- Tony Williams, former staffer for Senator Norm Coleman

2006 Council of the District of Columbia Ward 6 Republican primary
Party	Candidate	Votes	%
Republican	Tony Williams	376	88.26%
Write-in		50	11.74%
Total votes		426	100%

=== Independents ===
Candidates

- Will Cobb, academic administrator

=== General Election ===
2006 Council of the District of Columbia Ward 6 election
Party	Candidate	Votes	%
Democratic	Tommy Wells	10,318	61.23%
Independent	Will Cobb	4,634	27.50%
Republican	Tony Williams	1,839	10.91%
Write-in		60	0.36%
Total votes		16,851	100%
