= David Schwartzman (geologist) =

American professor of biology, geology, and geochemistry

David William Schwartzman
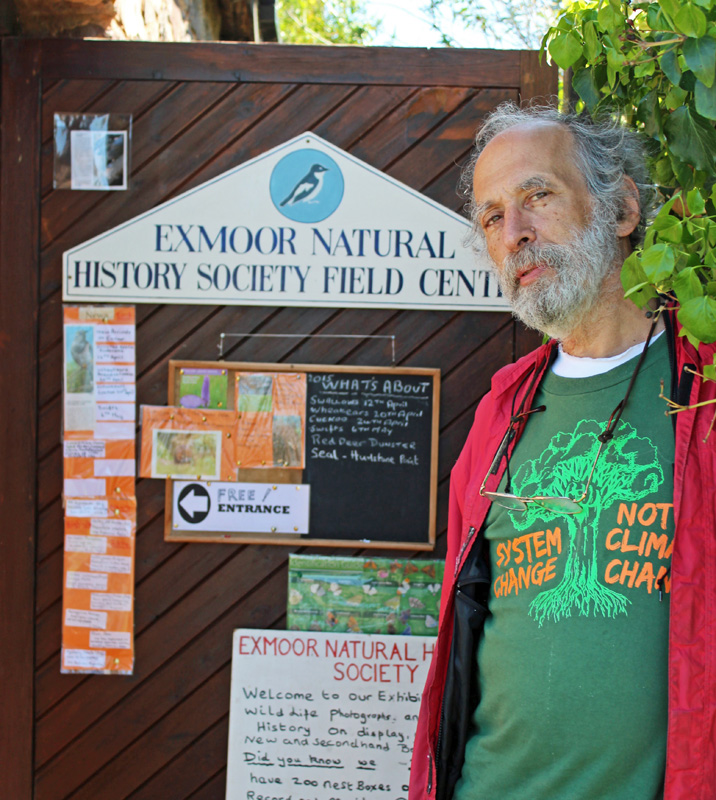
- Born: October 31, 1943; Brooklyn, New York, USA
- Died: July 1, 2025, age 81; Washington, DC, USA
- Education: City College of New York (BS, chemistry & geology); Brown University (MS & PhD, geochemistry)
- Scientific career
- Fields: Geochemistry; Biogeochemistry; Energy; Environmental studies; Evolutionary biology; Astrobiology; Paleobiology; Philosophy of science
- Workplaces: Howard University, Washington, DC

David William Schwartzman (October 31, 1943 to July 1, 2025) was a professor of biology and geology at Howard University from 1973 to 2012. He specialized in geochemistry, biogeochemistry, evolution, environmental sciences, astrobiology, and the philosophy of science. He retired as professor emeritus in 2012.

== Early life and education ==
David Schwartzman was born into a working-class Jewish family in Brooklyn, New York.

Schwartzman earned his B.S. degree in chemistry and biology at City College of New York in 1964. He then earned his M.S. and Ph.D. degrees in geochemistry from Brown University in Providence, Rhode Island.

== Career ==
From 1971 to 1973, Schwartzman taught at Hunter College in New York City, then briefly at the University of North Carolina in Chapel Hill. In 1973, he joined the faculty and was appointed as chair of the Department of Geology and Geography at Howard University in Washington, DC. During his tenure at Howard University, he was Chair of the Department of Geology and Geography from 1973 to 1985, and Director of Graduate Studies from 1987 to 1990. During his retirement, he continued his research and publishing.

Schwartzman's scholarship frequently connected his scientific work to politics, philosophy, philosophy of science, environmental issues, and social welfare. In 1985, he published a study of blood lead levels in children, and was active in advocating for the removal of lead from gasoline.

Campaign poster

== Political career ==
Schwartzman was politically active in Washington, D.C.. Schwartzman served as the chair of the D.C. Statehood Green Party. He repeatedly ran for the District of Columbia Council as a DC Statehood Green Party candidate, but was never successful at gaining a seat on the Council. Schwartzman was a member of the Democratic Socialists of America, with whom he did socialist organizing, and to whom he once quipped: "We do suffer from over-population – we have too many billionaires." A memorial in the journal Capitalism Nature Socialism lauded him as an "ecosocialist."

== Personal life and death ==
Schwartzman was married to Barbara Ann Major from 1966 to 1977, with whom he had a son, Peter. Schwartzman lived with his longtime partner, Emilie Junge, for 14 years, with whom he had another son, Samuel. Schwartzman met Joanne Fleming in 2001. They remained together and married shortly before his death in 2025. David Schwartzman died of complications from prostate cancer on July 1, 2025.

== Awards and recognition ==
2025: Resolution from the Board of Trustees, Howard University, honoring and commemorating the outstanding contributions of Dr. David W. Schwartzman.

2025, August 15: A Ceremonial Resolution ACR26-0072 by the Council of the District of Columbia, "To recognize, honor, and celebrate the life of Dr. David W. Schwartzman for his decades-long commitment to climate, economic, and social justice in the District of Columbia." Published in DC Register, Vol. 72, Page 008963.

== Selected publications ==
Books

- Schwartzman, D. W. (2021). The global solar commons, the future that is still possible: A guide for 21st Century activists. Washington, DC: The Solar Utopia.org Press.
- Schwartzman, P., & Schwartzman, D. (2019). The Earth is Not for Sale: A Path Out of Fossil Capitalism to the Other World That is Still Possible. Singapore: World Scientific.
- Schwartzman, David W. (2002). Life, Temperature, and the Earth: The Self-Organizing Biosphere (2nd ed.). New York: Columbia University Press.

Book Chapters

- Schwartzman, D., & Schwartzman, P. (2012). A rapid solar transition is not only possible, it is imperative. In H. Carwell, B. Grant, G. Kadoda, J Tharakan, J. Trimble, & C. Verharen (Eds.), Proceedings of the 5th International Conference on Appropriate Technology (pp. 109–116).
- Schwartzman, D. W. (2008). Coevolution of the biosphere and climate. In S. E. Jorgensen & B. Faith (Eds.), Encyclopedia of ecology (pp. 648–658). Oxford, UK: Elsevier.
- Schwartzman, D., & Middendorf, G. (2000). Biospheric cooling and the emergence of intelligence. In G. Memarchand & K. Meech (Eds.), A new era in bioastronomy, ASP Conference Series, Vol. 213 (pp. 425–429). San Francisco, CA: Astronomical Society of the Pacific.

Articles

- Schwartzman, Peter; Schwartzman, David; Department of Environmental Studies, Knox College, Galesburg, Illinois, USA; Department of Biology, Howard University, Washington, DC, USA (2021). "Can the 1.5 ℃ warming target be met in a global transition to 100% renewable energy?". AIMS Energy. 9 (6): 1170–1191. doi:10.3934/energy.2021054. ISSN 2333-8334.
- Schwartzman, D. W. (2020). Biospheric evolution is coarsely deterministic. Journal of Big History, IV(2), 50-66.
- Schwartzman, D. &. Schwartzman, P. (2014). A rapid solar transition is not only possible, it is imperative! African Journal of Science, Technology, Innovation and Development, 5(4), 297-302.
- Schwartzman, David (2008). "The Limits to Entropy: Continuing Misuse of Thermodynamics in Environmental and Marxist Theory". Science & Society. 72 (1): 43–62. doi:10.1521/siso.2007.72.1.43. ISSN 0036-8237. JSTOR 40404457.
- Boucher, Doug; Schwartzman, David; Zara, Jane; Caplan, Peter (2003). "Another Look at the End of the World". Capitalism Nature Socialism. 14 (3): 123–131. doi:10.1080/10455750308565538. ISSN 1045-5752.
- Schwartzman, David (1996). "Introduction". Science & Society. 60 (3): 261–265. doi:10.1177/003682379606000302. ISSN 0036-8237. JSTOR 40403570.
- Schwartzman, David (1996). "Solar Communism". Science & Society. 60 (3): 307–331. doi:10.1177/003682379606000306. ISSN 0036-8237. JSTOR 40403574.
- Schwartzman, David W.; Shore, Steven N.; Volk, Tyler; McMenamin, Mark (1994). "Self-organization of the Earth's biosphere-geochemical or geophysiological?". Origins of Life and Evolution of the Biosphere. 24 (5): 435–450. Bibcode:1994OLEB...24..435S. doi:10.1007/BF01582019. ISSN 0169-6149.
- Tera, Olfat; Schwartzman, David W.; Watkins, Teresa R. (1985). "Identification of Gasoline Lead in Children's Blood Using Isotopic Analysis". Archives of Environmental Health. 40 (2): 120–123. doi:10.1080/00039896.1985.10545901. ISSN 0003-9896. PMID 4004344.
- Schwartzman, David W. (1975). "Althusser, Dialectical Materialism and the Philosophy of Science". Science & Society. 39 (3): 318–330. doi:10.1177/003682377503900303. ISSN 0036-8237. JSTOR 40401861.
