= A. Scott Bolden =

American attorney and political commentator

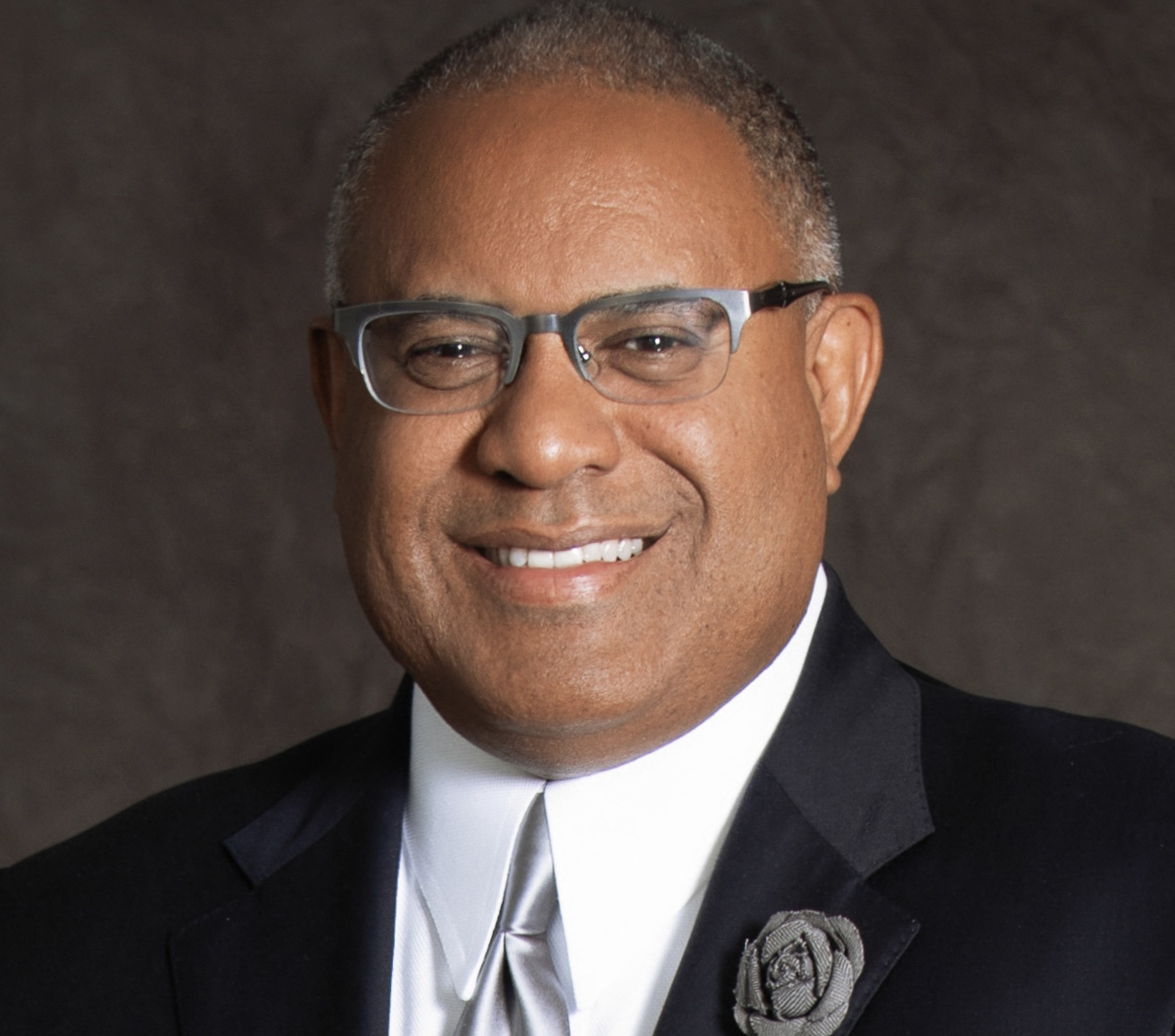
A. Scott Bolden

Alan Scott Bolden is an American attorney, law partner, and former radio and television host. He is currently a television and radio legal and political commentator, and as an attorney, continues to represent the interests of several nonprofits, including the United Negro College Fund, the Greater Washington Urban League, and the National Newspaper Publishers Association.

== Early life ==
Bolden was born in Joliet, Illinois to Raymond and Kathleen Bolden. Bolden's father, Raymond Bolden, was a criminal defense and civil rights attorney as well as a judge,[1] and was the head of the NAACP in Will County, Illinois.[2] His mother, Kathleen Bolden, was a civil rights activist. She supported his father's law practice in the early years, and later returned to college and graduate school to receive degrees in Black History and Sociology. She was a college professor, administrator and entrepreneur who owned Educational Associates and several businesses in the education arena.[3]

== Education ==
At Morehouse College and later at Howard University School of Law, he trained for leadership under the tutelage of Dr. Benjamin E. Mays, Dr. Robert Brisbane, Judge William Bryant, Attorney and civil rights activist, Julian Dugas, Howard Law School Dean, J. Clay Smith, Judge Luke C. Moore and Judge Wiley A. Branton, among others.

== Legal career ==
Upon graduation, Bolden worked as Assistant District Attorney in the New York County District Attorney's Office where he prosecuted hundreds of misdemeanor and felony cases. He went on to work as Legal Counsel to the Committee on the Judiciary Council of the District of Columbia. In 1991, Bolden started as an associate with the law firm Reed Smith, making partner in four years, and was the first African American in the history of the firm to be promoted from associate to full equity partner.[6] Later, he became Managing Partner of the firm's D.C. office, representing a number of high-profile clients in civil, regulatory and white-collar litigation matters and throughout his legal career, he has successfully defended many high-profile athletes, entertainers and politicians.[7] In 2018, Bolden resumed serving as office managing partner of the Reed Smith, Washington, D.C. office. He is also a former Member of Reed Smith's executive committee.[8] In 2021, he was representing Baltimore's State's Attorney Marilyn Mosby and Baltimore City Council President Nick Mosby.[9] In 2022, Bolden stepped down as Managing Partner of the Reed Smith Washington, D.C. office.

From January 2022, Bolden acted as defense for former Baltimore State's Attorney Marilyn Mosby, but was allowed to withdraw from her defense by U.S. District Judge Lydia Kay Griggsby in 2023 after he violated the court's local laws by divulging confidential juror information, filing a motion without a Maryland attorney's signature, and using profanity on the courthouse steps while accusing the U.S. Attorney's Office in Maryland of racism. District Judge Richard D. Bennett, while finding Bolden's actions “abhorrent", did not convict him of criminal contempt.

== Community and civic engagement ==
While maintaining a full-time white-collar defense and litigation practice, Bolden led the District of Columbia Chamber of Commerce and the District of Columbia Democratic Party, hosted a local Washington, D.C., radio show called "What Matters Most" and co-hosted[2][1] his own cable television show called "Building Bridges for Business."[8] In 2006, Bolden ran to become an at-large member of the Council for the District of Columbia and lost.[6] Bolden serves as the current Vice Chair of the Morehouse College Board of Trustees[10] and is a former member of the Board of Visitors of the Howard School of Law as well as is a former member the board of the Joint Center for Political and Economic Studies. Additionally, he continues to represent the interests of several nonprofits, including the United Negro College Fund, the Greater Washington Urban League, and the National Newspaper Publishers Association.

== Media appearances ==
In addition to his work as a political commentator and contributor for NewsNation Now, Bolden has offered political and legal analysis on MSNBC, CNN, Fox News, Fox Business Network, BBC, NTD and NDTV. He has appeared on All in with Chris Hayes, The Rachel Maddow Show, CNN NewsNight with Abby Phillip, Laura Coates Live, The Situation Room with Wolf Blitzer and multiple shows on NewsNation. He is a frequent guest on RolandMartinUnfiltered and the Armstrong Williams Show and is an opinion columnist for The Hill.

== Awards ==
Bolden has received numerous honors and awards including Attorney of the Year Award from the Boy Scouts of America, the Minority Corporate Counsel Association's Rainmaker Award, was designated a White Collar Criminal Defense Super Lawyer from 2013 to 2020.[15] In 2021, the Washington Bar Association (WBA) named A. Scott Bolden as the recipient of its prestigious Ollie May Cooper Award. In 2022, Bolden was named to Savoy Magazine's list of Most Influential Black Lawyers.In 2025 he received the Tae Lifetime Achievement Award from the University of the District of Columbia.[17] In 2026 he received an award for Managing Partner of the Year by the African-American Managing Partners & General Counsel Network.[18]
