= Marie Johns =

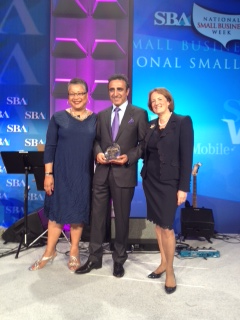

Deputy Administrator of the Small Business Administration
- In office June 22, 2010 – April 2013
- President: Barack Obama
- Administrator: Karen Mills
- Preceded by: Jovita Carranza
- Succeeded by: Althea Coetzee

Personal details
- Born: Marie Collins Johns; August 19, 1951 (age 75) Indianapolis, Indiana, U.S.
- Party: Democratic
- Education: Indiana University Bloomington (B.S., MPA)

Marie Collins Johns (born August 19, 1951) is an American businesswoman and former civil servant who served as deputy administrator of the Small Business Administration. She was nominated by President Barack Obama on December 17, 2009, and confirmed unanimously by the Senate on June 22, 2010. Johns is a former president and CEO of the telecommunications company Verizon. She made an unsuccessful bid for the Democratic party nomination in the 2006 Washington, D.C. mayoral election.

== Education ==
Johns holds B.S. and M.P.A. degrees from Indiana University. She was awarded an honorary doctorate of humane letters from Howard University in 2013 and from Trinity College (now Trinity University) in 1999.

== Career ==
Johns began her career as a secretary and worked her way up to be President and CEO of Verizon, Washington, D.C., a $700 million telecommunications company. While at Verizon, Johns created a job-training program that placed over 400 teenagers, many of whom were high school dropouts, in communications jobs. She also led the efforts of Verizon's predecessor company, Bell Atlantic, to provide a high-speed internet connection to every public school and public library in Washington, D.C. Johns also led the effort to create technology learning centers in each of the city's eight wards and played a key role in securing $10 million in federal funding to implement a school-to-careers initiative.

Johns is a trustee of Howard University and has served as chair of the Howard University Middle School of Mathematics and Science, which welcomed its inaugural class of 120 sixth-graders August 29, 2005. Johns is a former chair of the YMCA of Metropolitan Washington and recently co-chaired a $4 million capital campaign for the Metropolitan Washington Girl Scouts Council. She is also an annual participant in the Girl Scouts Camp.

In the 1980s, Johns spearheaded the establishment of the first home in the city for babies born to mothers addicted to crack cocaine. Johns is a former chair of Leadership Washington, the DC Chamber of Commerce, and has served as a director of the Greater Washington Board of Trade, the Economic Club of Washington, the National Capital Revitalization Corporation, and the Anacostia Waterfront Corporation. Johns is the Founding Chair of the Washington DC Technology Council and a member of the senior board of stewards of Washington's historic Metropolitan African Methodist Episcopal Church.

== Personal life ==
Marie Johns is married to Wendell Johns. They have been married for over 45 years. Marie and Wendell are the parents of Richard Johns, an attorney in private practice in Washington. The couple has two grandchildren.
