= 2006 Washington, D.C., mayoral election =

- November 7, 2006
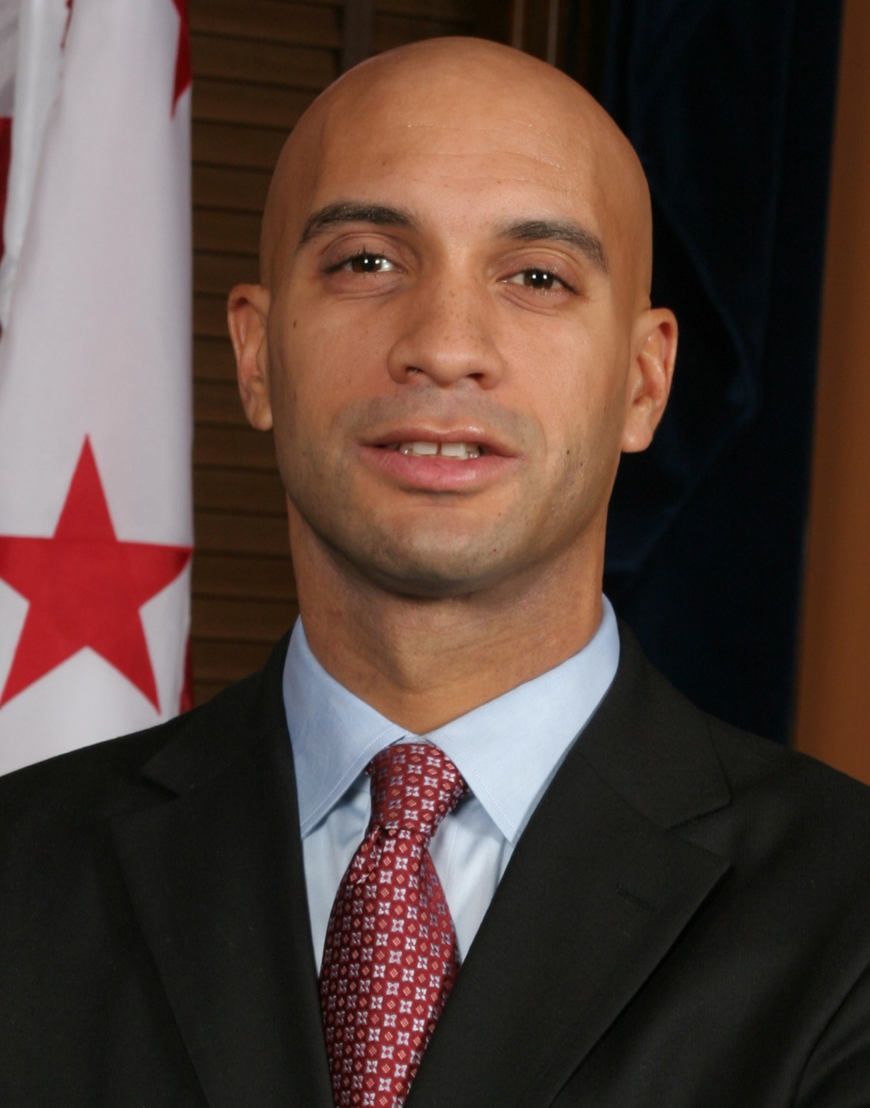

Nominee	Adrian Fenty	David Kranich
Party	Democratic	Republican
Popular vote	98,740	6,744
Percentage	89.73%	6.13%
- Results by ward Fenty: 80–90% >90%
Mayor before election
Anthony A. Williams
Democratic
Elected mayor
Adrian Fenty
Democratic

On November 7, 2006, Washington, D.C., held an election for its mayor. It determined the successor to two-term mayor Anthony A. Williams, who did not run for re-election. The Democratic primary was held on September 12. The winner of both was Adrian Fenty, the representative for Ward 4 on the D.C. Council. He took office on January 2, 2007, becoming the sixth directly elected mayor since the establishment of home rule in the District.

== Democratic Party primary ==
=== Candidates ===
- Linda W. Cropp - DC Council Chair, Cropp was considered Fenty's rival as the frontrunner for the mayoral primary, although Fenty took a lead in the polls about two months before the election.
- Marie Johns
- Vincent Orange, Ward 5 Council Representative
- Michael A. Brown, who consistently had trailed the pack in polling data, dropped out of the race September 8, and announced he was throwing his support to Cropp.

=== Endorsements ===
- Fenty received the endorsements of, most notably, The Washington Post and former mayor Marion Barry.
- Cropp received the endorsement of, most notably, outgoing mayor Anthony A. Williams.
- Orange received the endorsement of, most notably, recently terminated Metrobus driver Sidney Davis, as highlighted in the August 21, 2006 article, "Soapbox on Wheels", in The Washington Post.
- Johns received the endorsement of, most notably, The Washington Times.

=== Results ===
Results by ward Fenty: 50–60%; 60–70%

Democratic Primary Results
Candidate	Votes	Percent
Adrian Fenty (winner)	60,732	57.20%
Linda Cropp	32,897	30.98%
Marie Johns	8,501	8.01%
Vincent Orange	3,075	2.90%
Michael A. Brown	650	0.61%
Artee (RT) Milligan	105	0.10%
Nestor Djonkam	73	0.07%
Write In, if any	145	0.14%
Total	106,178	100.00%
Source: D.C. Board of Elections

== Republican Party primary ==
David W. Kranich ran in the Republican Party primary election. Albert Ceccone gathered signatures to run on the ballot as well, but after a challenge by Kranich, the District of Columbia Board of Elections and Ethics declared many of the signatures invalid. Consequently, Ceccone did not have enough valid signatures to appear on the ballot, and only Kranich's name appeared as running for mayor on the Republican primary ballot. Kranich received 65% of the vote.

== Statehood Green Party primary ==
Chris Otten ran unopposed for the Statehood Green party's primary election. Otten received 50% of the vote.

== General election ==
=== Nominees ===
- Adrian Fenty - Democratic Party
- David Kranich - Republican Party
- Chris Otten - D.C. Statehood Green Party

=== Results ===
2006 Washington, D.C. mayoral election results
Party	Candidate	Votes	%	±%
Democratic	Adrian Fenty	98,740	89.73	+29.12
Republican	David Kranich	6,744	6.13	−28.34
DC Statehood Green	Chris Otten	4,554	4.14	+1.68
Majority		91,996	83.60	
Turnout		110,038		
