= Adrian Fenty =

Mayor of the District of Columbia from 2007 to 2011

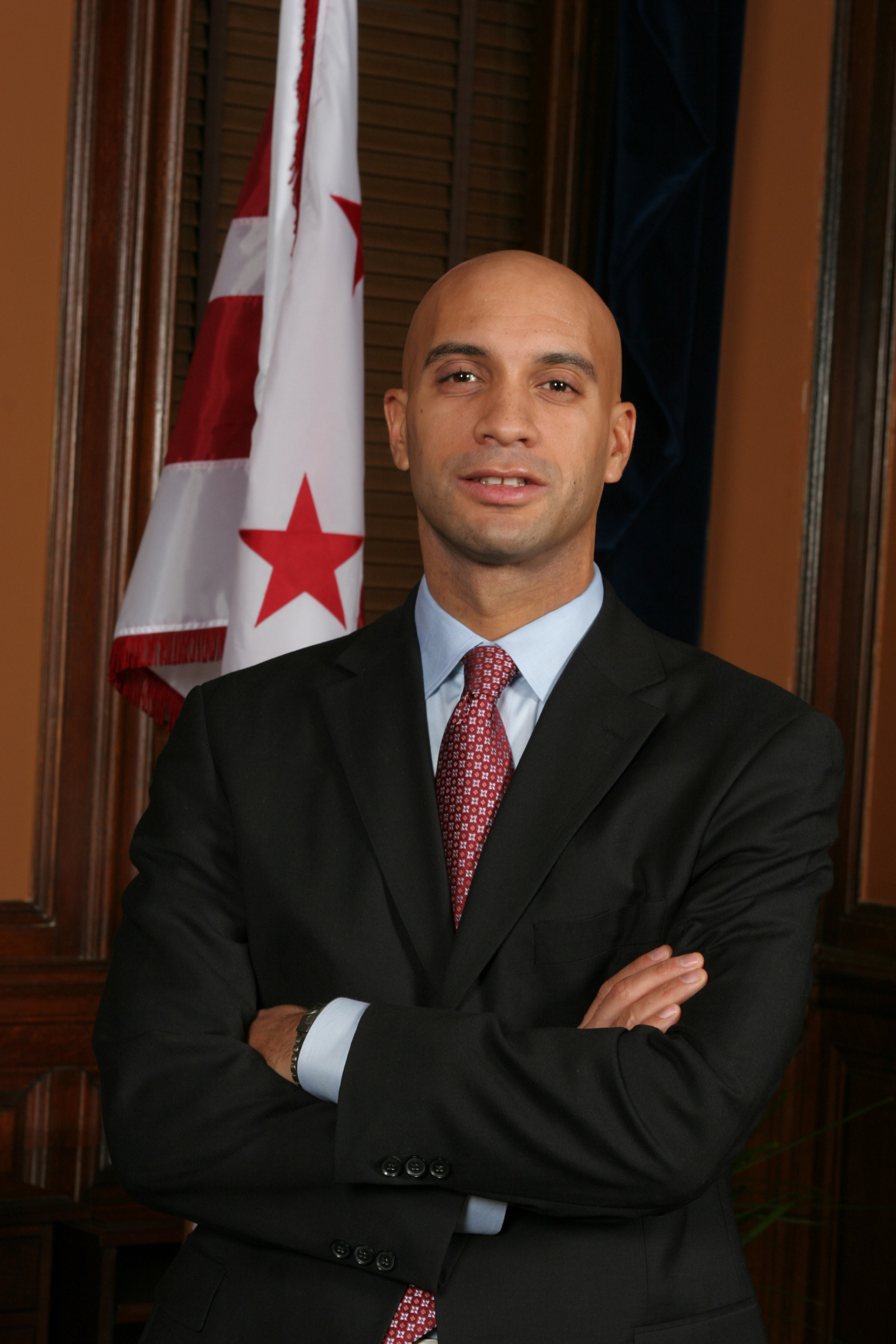
- Official portrait, 2007

6th Mayor of the District of Columbia
- In office January 2, 2007 – January 2, 2011
- Preceded by: Anthony Williams
- Succeeded by: Vincent Gray

Member of the Council of the District of Columbia from the 4th ward
- In office January 3, 2001 – January 2, 2007
- Preceded by: Charlene Drew Jarvis
- Succeeded by: Muriel Bowser

Personal details
- Born: Adrian Malik Fenty; December 6, 1970 (age 55) Washington, D.C., U.S.
- Party: Democratic
- Spouse: Michelle Cross (separated)
- Children: 3
- Education: Oberlin College (BA); Howard University (JD)

Adrian Malik Fenty (born December 6, 1970) is an American politician, who served as the mayor of the District of Columbia from 2007 to 2011.

A Washington, D.C. native, Fenty graduated from Oberlin College and Howard University Law School, then served for six years on the D.C. Council. He served one term as D.C. mayor and lost his bid for reelection at the primary level to his eventual successor, Democrat Vincent C. Gray. Though Fenty won the Republican mayoral primary as a write-in candidate, he declined the Republican nomination and said he would likely not seek elected office again.

Since leaving office, Fenty has become a special advisor to the venture capital firm Andreessen Horowitz, and served as a member of the business development team at the law firm Perkins Coie. Fenty has held advisory and business development roles with Rosetta Stone, Everfi, and Capgemini. He has served on the boards of directors at two nonprofits: Genesys Works-Bay Area and Fight for Children. He has served as a paid speaker, part-time college professor, and adviser for state and local governments with an information technology consulting firm.

He co-founded in 2019 as managing partner a venture capital firm, MaC Venture Capital, headquartered in Los Angeles, California.

== Early life, education, and family ==
Fenty was born in Washington, D.C., the second of the three children of Jeanette Bianchi Perno Fenty and Phil Fenty. He is the middle child amongst three boys: Shawn, himself, and Jesse. Fenty's mother is Italian-American. Her family immigrated to the United States from the commune of Monte San Giovanni Campano in Lazio in 1920 to Buffalo, NY. His father, who is also from Buffalo, New York, has roots in Barbados and Panama. Phil and Jeanette Fenty moved to Washington, D.C., in 1967. Fenty was raised in the Mount Pleasant neighborhood. While he was growing up, his parents owned and ran a Fleet Feet athletic shoe store in the D.C. neighborhood of Adams Morgan.

Fenty graduated from Mackin Catholic High School, where he ran track. He earned a B.A. in English and economics from Oberlin College, and a J.D. from the Howard University School of Law. He remains a member of Kappa Alpha Psi fraternity.

== Early political career ==
Before becoming involved in local D.C. politics, Fenty worked as an intern for U.S. Senator Howard Metzenbaum (D-OH), U.S. Delegate Eleanor Holmes Norton (D-DC), and U.S. Representative Joseph P. Kennedy II (D-MA).

He then served as an aide to Councilmember Kevin P. Chavous, was elected to the Advisory Neighborhood Commission (ANC), district 4C, and also was president of the 16th Street Neighborhood Civic Association.

== Council of the District of Columbia ==
In 2000, Fenty won a seat on the Council of the District of Columbia, defeating longtime Ward 4 Councilmember Charlene Drew Jarvis by a margin of 57 to 43 percent after engaging in an aggressive door-to-door strategy. Unopposed in both the primary and general elections in 2004, Fenty was reelected for a second term.

The Washington Post described Fenty's performance as a Council member as "independent" and "contrarian". During his time on the council, he opposed public funding for a new Major League Baseball stadium, saying the owners should pay for it. He proposed a $1 billion capital improvement program for the public schools—which the Council initially opposed, but eventually passed. According to The Washington Post, Fenty's legislative style was to focus on constituent services and take attention grabbing positions.

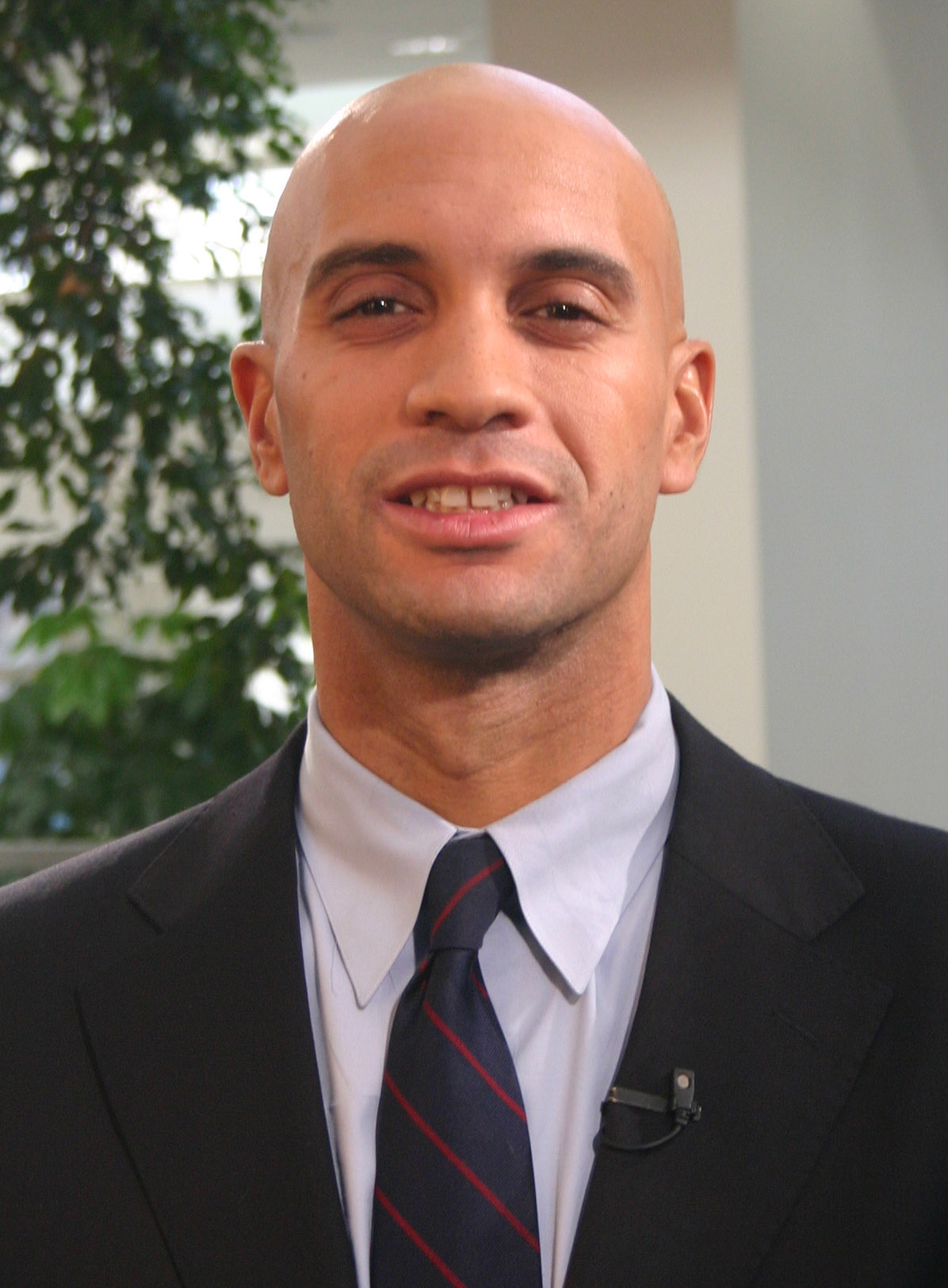
Adrian Fenty, December 2006

== 2006 mayoral campaign ==
Fenty began his campaign to replace retiring mayor Anthony A. Williams in 2005. Then-Council Chair Linda Cropp, businesswoman Marie Johns, then-Councilmember Vincent Orange, and lobbyist Michael A. Brown also vied for the position.

The race was widely viewed as neck-and-neck between Fenty and Cropp through the spring of 2006. Fenty ran on a platform of bringing a more energetic and hands-on approach to district government,, advancing bold ideas for change, and sticking to them. Fenty said he would take his uncompromising style to the mayor's office, and cited with approval Margaret Thatcher's saying that, "Consensus is the absence of leadership". Cropp stressed her 25 years of experience in district government and her desire to continue the progress made by Anthony Williams, who endorsed her candidacy. She also stressed her ability to cooperate with diverse groups and reach consensus. She criticized Fenty's proposed approach to governing, saying the mayor's job is "not just standing up and saying, 'This is what I want done,' and miraculously it's going to happen." Both candidates raised significant and nearly equal amounts of money – roughly $1.75 million through June 10, 2006 – and neither gained any significant advantages from the numerous candidate debates and forums.

By July 2006, polls showed Fenty with a roughly 10-point advantage; political observers debated whether it was due to Fenty's door-to-door campaign, Cropp's lack of engagement in the campaign, or the electorate's desire for a new direction. Cropp's campaign began running negative attack ads during the month before the primary, painting Fenty as unfit for the job and as a careless lawyer who had been admonished by the D.C. Bar. (That criticism is based on a 2005 incident in which he had received an informal admonition from the Bar for his role in a probate case in 1999.) The attacks backfired and Fenty won all 142 district precincts in the Democratic Primary—a feat unparalleled in earlier mayoral elections—defeating Cropp by a 57 to 31 percent margin. He received 89 percent of the vote in the general election and became the District's sixth elected mayor since the establishment of home rule.

== Mayor of the District of Columbia (2007–2011) ==
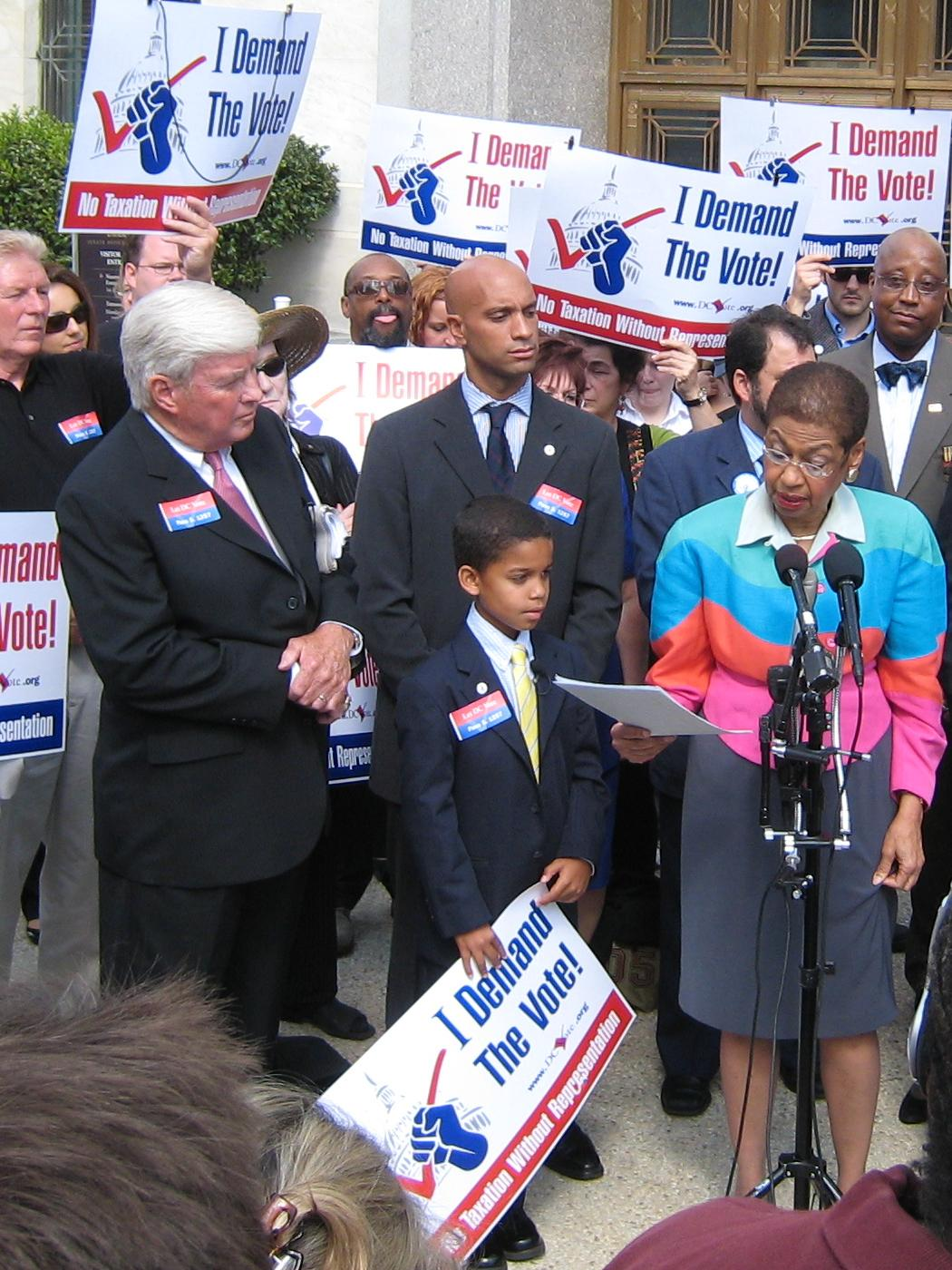
Jack Kemp, Fenty, and Eleanor Holmes Norton at D.C. Vote rally on Capitol Hill

Education reform was a major focus of Fenty's mayoral tenure. On the first day of his term, he introduced legislation to vest control of the public schools in himself, rather than the elected school board. Previous attempts to reform the schools, including one in 1996 where a D.C. financial control board took charge of the schools, had failed. At the beginning of Fenty's term, student test performance scores and graduation rates were among the lowest in the nation, and District residents had been demanding that the schools be "fixed". In April 2007, the D.C. Council approved Fenty's plan; the necessary legislation was approved by the U.S. Congress and signed into law by President George W. Bush in May 2007.

Under the new structure, the existing superintendent was replaced by a chancellor selected by the mayor and reporting directly to him. The power shift also allowed Fenty to make swift changes in the system's central office, alter teacher qualification requirements, and implement a school consolidation process. His selection of Michelle Rhee to manage District schools surprised the education establishment. In choosing Rhee, Fenty consulted with national education figures including New York City School Chancellor Joel Klein.

The restructuring has been credited with improvements. To better allocate resources, Fenty and Rhee significantly reduced the school system's central administrative staff and closed 23 schools with low enrollments. After 2007, student achievement tests at the secondary level reportedly rose 14 points in reading and 17 points in math. Student SAT scores rose 27 points in 2010. Graduation rates rose each year since 2007, and 72 percent of District students took the Preliminary Scholastic Aptitude Test (PSAT), which functions as a practice test for college bound students. Fenty's administration had also taken on a major, five-year maintenance and construction effort to improve school buildings by 2014. Fenty and Rhee successfully negotiated a collective bargaining agreement with the Washington Teachers Union establishing a system of performance-based teacher compensation.

The Fenty administration also overhauled District agencies for efficiency. His choice of a woman, Cathy Lanier, for police chief received media attention. Under Fenty, Lanier added police officers to the streets and expanded community policing initiatives, for example, "beefing up" the policy of accepting anonymous text message tips from local residents to cut down on potential retaliation. The homicide rate in the District dropped 25% in 2009; the homicide closure rate rose to 70%. with Fenty reporting that homicides were at their "lowest level since 1964" and that "both violent crimes and property crimes" had experienced a double-digit decline.

Fenty championed development efforts including renovating libraries, parks and recreation centers. Under Fenty, 16 neighborhood and school playgrounds were opened and nine play courts and fields were completed. The District's largest shopping center, the DC USA Shopping Center, and the Camp Simms retail development were opened, and thousands of affordable housing units were established or renovated. The "Housing First" program to provide permanent supportive housing for the district's homeless was begun. The backlog of Child Protective Services (CPS) investigations was reduced by improving the retention of social workers, building an experienced leadership team, and increasing the recruitment of social workers to fill vacancies. Additionally, the Fenty administration improved the delivery of emergency medical services and expanded health care coverage for the uninsured. It also finalized the sale of Greater Southeast Community Hospital (now United Medical Center) in a public-private partnership that kept the facility open.

In December 2009, Fenty signed the Religious Freedom and Civil Marriage Equality Act of 2009 to legalize same-sex marriage in the District of Columbia.

While serving as mayor, Fenty was a member of the Mayors Against Illegal Guns Coalition, an organization formed in 2006 and co-chaired by New York City mayor Michael Bloomberg and Boston mayor Thomas Menino. Fenty was known to carry three BlackBerry devices: one directly connecting him to the police chief, the second for other district business, and the third for personal matters.

=== 2010 re-election campaign ===
On July 31, 2009, Fenty's 2010 mayoral campaign chest passed the 2006 primary fundraising total of $2.4 million. Fenty officially launched his reelection bid in April 2010, defending his management style and pledging to remind voters that he had made the types of tough decisions that are necessary for real change.

On August 1, 2010, the editorial board of The Washington Post officially endorsed Fenty, citing his attempts to fix the District's struggling public school system. The Washington City Paper followed on September 9.

January 2010 hypothetical polling showed challenger Vincent C. Gray, the Council chair, in the lead by 4 points; The Washington Post poll of August 29 found Gray with a 17-point lead; a Clarus poll conducted September 7 gave Gray a 7-point lead; and a Public Policy Polling survey sponsored by WAMU-FM radio and Washington City Paper showed an 11 percent lead for Gray on September 8.

Fenty lost the September 14 Democratic primary to Gray by a margin of 10 points—54 percent to 44 percent. While Fenty received the most write-in votes for mayor in the Republican primary election, Fenty had previously said he would not accept the Republican nomination. Following the reporting of the primary results, Fenty stated that it was highly unlikely he would run for public office again.

In August 2011 an investigation into the hiring practices of Mayor Gray found that during the 2010 primary, a Gray campaign official had paid another candidate, Sulaimon Brown, to disparage Fenty.

==== Forward Faster ====
Fenty, like all District mayors and council members, had a citizen-service fund intended to help the residents of the District of Columbia. Much of the cash held by the fund came from the money raised during his 2006 mayoral candidacy.

Upon leaving office, District law required Fenty to donate the remaining funds in his citizen-service fund to a nonprofit organization. Two weeks prior to Fenty's last day as mayor, his chief campaign fundraiser, John Falcicchio, incorporated a social welfare organization called Forward Faster as a legacy organization to carry out Fenty's vision. Fenty donated the $440,709 remaining in his citizen-service fund to Forward Faster.

Forward Faster's board of directors consisted of Falcicchio; George Simpson, Fenty's appointee to the National Capital Planning Commission); Sara Lasner, a former aide to Fenty; and Jason Washington, a former Fenty advance man. During its first year of existence, Forward Faster spent $88,700 on grants; $88,000 of salary to John Falcicchio as executive director; $49,500 to Tracy Sandler, also as executive director; and $3,000 to Jennifer Nguyen, also as another executive director. By 2013, Simpson, Lasner, and Washington were no longer connected to the organization.

Since then, District law was changed to prohibit an elected official from incorporating a nonprofit organization at the end of his or her term in office and transferring constituent services fund money into it.

== Post-mayoral life ==
After his term as mayor was over, Fenty signed with Greater Talent Network, a major speakers bureau, in January 2011. The same month, Fenty became an outside adviser and counsel to Heffler, Radetich & Saitta, an accounting and consulting firm based in Philadelphia. Also in January 2011, it was announced that Fenty would become a distinguished visiting professor of politics, a featured lecturer and a career adviser in the Department of African American Studies at Oberlin College in Ohio. In February 2011, Fenty became an outside adviser to Rosetta Stone, which produces foreign-language software. In March 2011, Fenty became a strategic adviser for the state and local government practice of Capgemini Government Solutions LLC, an information technology consulting firm. In May 2011, Fenty became a member of the advisory board of EverFi Inc., an online education and certification firm. In July 2011, Fenty joined the plaintiff and litigation oriented law firm of Klores Perry Mitchell as special counsel.

On Morning Joe on March 8, 2011, Fenty backed Wisconsin Republican Governor Scott Walker's anti-union efforts and broadly condemned the concept of public employee collective bargaining. Saying that "Most governors and mayors would love to be able to manage their team without the interference of collective bargaining", Fenty expressed his faith in the ability of managers to set fair wages and hours, and to fairly reward or hold their employees accountable. He also said that the Democratic Wisconsin senators should be held accountable for leaving the state to delay the enactment of Walker's legislation.

== Personal life ==
In 1997, Fenty married Jamaican-British Michelle Cross Fenty, a corporate attorney. The couple have three children: twin sons born in 2000 (Matthew, Andrew) and a daughter born in 2008 (Aerin). In January 2013, the couple officially separated.

His son Andrew is a tennis player who achieved a national junior tennis rank of 4 before starting at the University of Michigan in 2018 where he earned Freshman of the Year status from the Intercollegiate Tennis Association and the Big Ten Conference and was named the NCAA's Rookie of the Year.

In August 2013, The Washington Post reported that Fenty was in a relationship with Laurene Powell Jobs. Powell Jobs, widow of Apple co-founder Steve Jobs, also has three children. The couple was seen arriving for a state dinner at the White House in August 2016 and was last seen together in July 2025 for the wedding of her daughter, Eve Jobs. In October 2017, it was reported by The Washington Post that Powell Jobs and Fenty were no longer dating but remained close friends.

Fenty is an amateur triathlete and runner. During his time as mayor, he participated in the Nation's Triathlon and the Washington, D.C. Triathlon.

Fenty is Catholic.

== Electoral history ==
=== 2000 ===
2000 Council of the District of Columbia, Ward 4, Democratic Primary Election
Party	Candidate	Votes	%
Democratic	Adrian Fenty	8,136	57
Democratic	Charlene Drew Jarvis	6,193	43
Democratic	Write-in	51	0

2000 Council of the District of Columbia, Ward 4, General Election
Party	Candidate	Votes	%
Democratic	Adrian Fenty	22,201	89
DC Statehood Green	Renée Bowser	2,604	10
	Write-in	95	0

=== 2004 ===
2004 Council of the District of Columbia, Ward 4, Democratic Primary Election
Party	Candidate	Votes	%
Democratic	Adrian Fenty	11,659	99
Democratic	Write-in	146	1

2004 Council of the District of Columbia, Ward 4, General Election
Party	Candidate	Votes	%
Democratic	Adrian Fenty	30,530	99
	Write-in	334	1

=== 2006 ===
2006 Mayor of the District of Columbia, Democratic Primary Election
Party	Candidate	Votes	%
Democratic	Adrian Fenty	60,732	57
Democratic	Linda W. Cropp	32,897	31
Democratic	Marie Johns	8,501	8
Democratic	Vincent Orange	3,075	3
Democratic	Michael A. Brown	650	1
Democratic	Artee (RT) Milligan	105	0
Democratic	Nestor Djonkam	73	0
Democratic	Write-in	145	0

2006 Mayor of the District of Columbia, General Election
Party	Candidate	Votes	%
Democratic	Adrian Fenty	106,848	89
Republican	David W. Kranich	7,517	6
DC Statehood Green	Chris Otten	4,914	4
	Write-in	1,351	1

=== 2010 ===
2010 Mayor of the District of Columbia, Democratic Primary Election
Party	Candidate	Votes	%
Democratic	Vincent C. Gray	72,648	54.27
Democratic	Adrian Fenty	59,524	44.47
Democratic	Leo Alexander	908	0.68
Democratic	Ernest E. Johnson	317	0.24
Democratic	write-in, including Calvin H. Gurley	248	0.19
Democratic	Sulaimon Brown	209	0.16

Party political offices
Preceded by Anthony Williams	Democratic nominee for Mayor of the District of Columbia; 2006	Succeeded by Vincent Gray
Political offices
Preceded by Anthony Williams	Mayor of the District of Columbia; 2007–2011	Succeeded by Vincent Gray
