= 1996 Council of the District of Columbia election =

US Election

- November 5, 1996

6 seats on the Council of the District of Columbia 7 seats needed for a majority
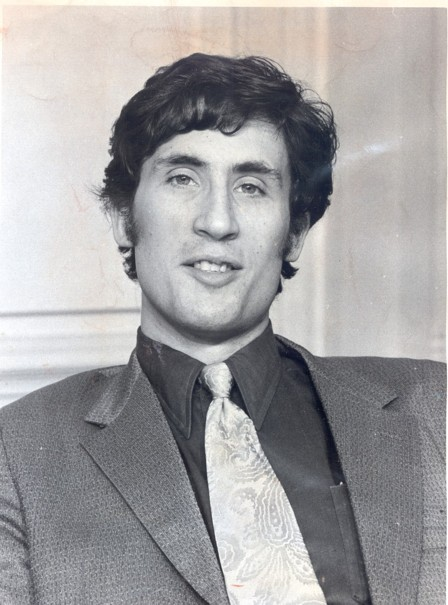

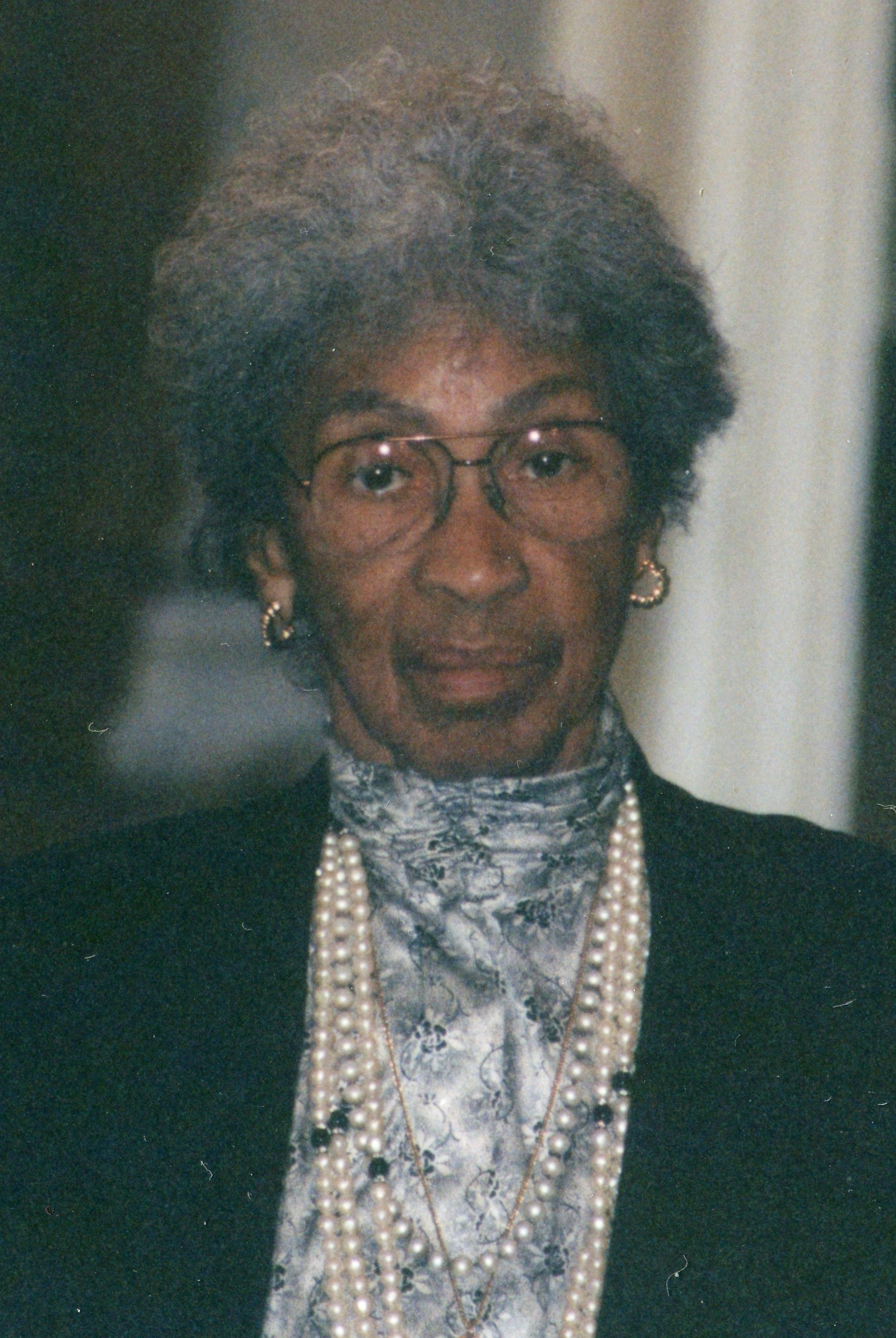

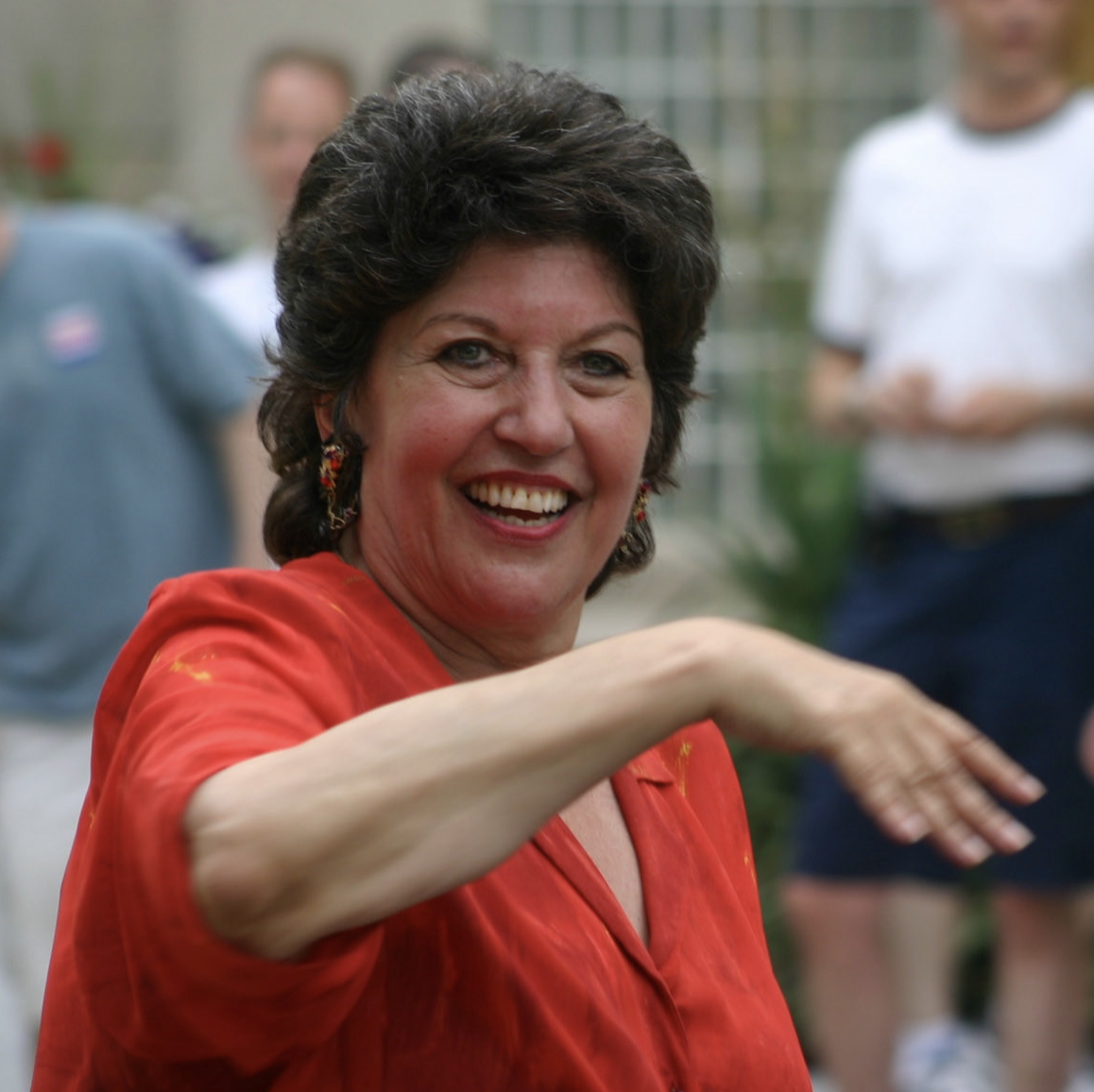
	Majority party	Minority party
Leader	David A. Clarke	Hilda Mason
Party	Democratic	DC Statehood
Seats before	10	1
Seats after	10	1
Seat change	Steady	Steady
	Third party	Fourth party
Leader	William Lightfoot	Carol Schwartz
Party	Independent	Republican
Seats before	1	0
Seats after	0	1
Seat change	▼1	▲1

The 1996 general election for the Council of the District of Columbia was held on November 5, with primaries taking place on September 10. Republican Carol Schwartz was re-elected to the at-large seat she had lost to William Lightfoot in 1988 after he declined to run for a third term, while then-Ward 6 councilmember Harold Brazil ran for and won the at-large seat of the retiring John Ray. The only incumbent to lose re-election for their own seat was Ward 8 councilmember Eydie Whittington, who was beat by Sandy Allen in a rematch of the 1995 special election.

== Summary ==
Democrats remained the largest party on the Council, with no seats being lost to other parties or independents. Republicans returned to the Council for the first time since 1988 with the election of Carol Schwartz, while the retirement of William Lightfoot left the Council with no independents.

=== At-large ===
Position	Incumbent				Candidates
Position	Member	Party	First elected	Status	Candidates
At-large	John Ray	Democratic	1979 (special)	Incumbent retired. New councilmember elected. Democratic hold.	▌ ✓ Harold Brazil 42.9%; ▌ ✓ Carol Schwartz 29.4%; ▌ Sam Jordan 7.0%; ▌ Mark Thompson 6.3%; ▌ Valencia Mohammed 5.7%; ▌ James Baxter 5.3%; ▌ Robert Hamilton Jr. 1.3%; ▌ Ernie Brooks 1.2%; ▌ Don Folden Sr. 0.6%
At-large	William Lightfoot	Independent	1977 (special)	Incumbent retired. New councilmember elected. Republican gain.	▌ ✓ Harold Brazil 42.9%; ▌ ✓ Carol Schwartz 29.4%; ▌ Sam Jordan 7.0%; ▌ Mark Thompson 6.3%; ▌ Valencia Mohammed 5.7%; ▌ James Baxter 5.3%; ▌ Robert Hamilton Jr. 1.3%; ▌ Ernie Brooks 1.2%; ▌ Don Folden Sr. 0.6%

=== Wards ===
Position	Incumbent				Candidates
Position	Member	Party	First elected	Status	Candidates
Ward 2	Jack Evans	Democratic	1991 (special)	Incumbent re-elected.	▌ ✓ Jack Evans 78.6%; ▌ Roger L. Moffatt 20.7%
Ward 4	Charlene Drew Jarvis	Democratic	1979 (special)	Incumbent re-elected.	▌ ✓ Charlene Drew Jarvis 78.3%; ▌ Rick Malachi 20.7%
Ward 7	Kevin P. Chavous	Democratic	1992	Incumbent re-elected.	▌ ✓ Kevin P. Chavous 89.8%; ▌ Durand A. Ford 6.3%; ▌ James Bernard Miles 3.3%
Ward 8	Eydie Whittington	Democratic	1995 (special)	Incumbent lost re-election New member elected. Democratic hold.	▌ ✓ Sandy Allen 78.3%; ▌ William Lockridge 12.8%; ▌ Rahim Jenkins 6.4%; ▌ W. Cardell Shelton 1.5%; ▌ Jephunneh Lawrence 0.9%

== At-large ==
1996 Council of the District of Columbia At-large election
- November 5, 1996
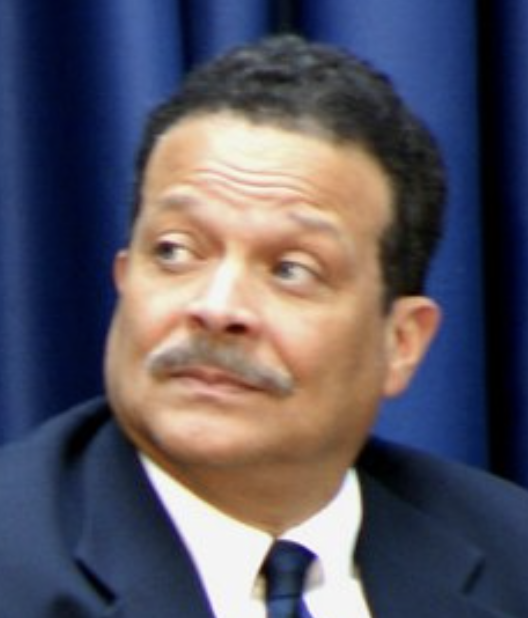

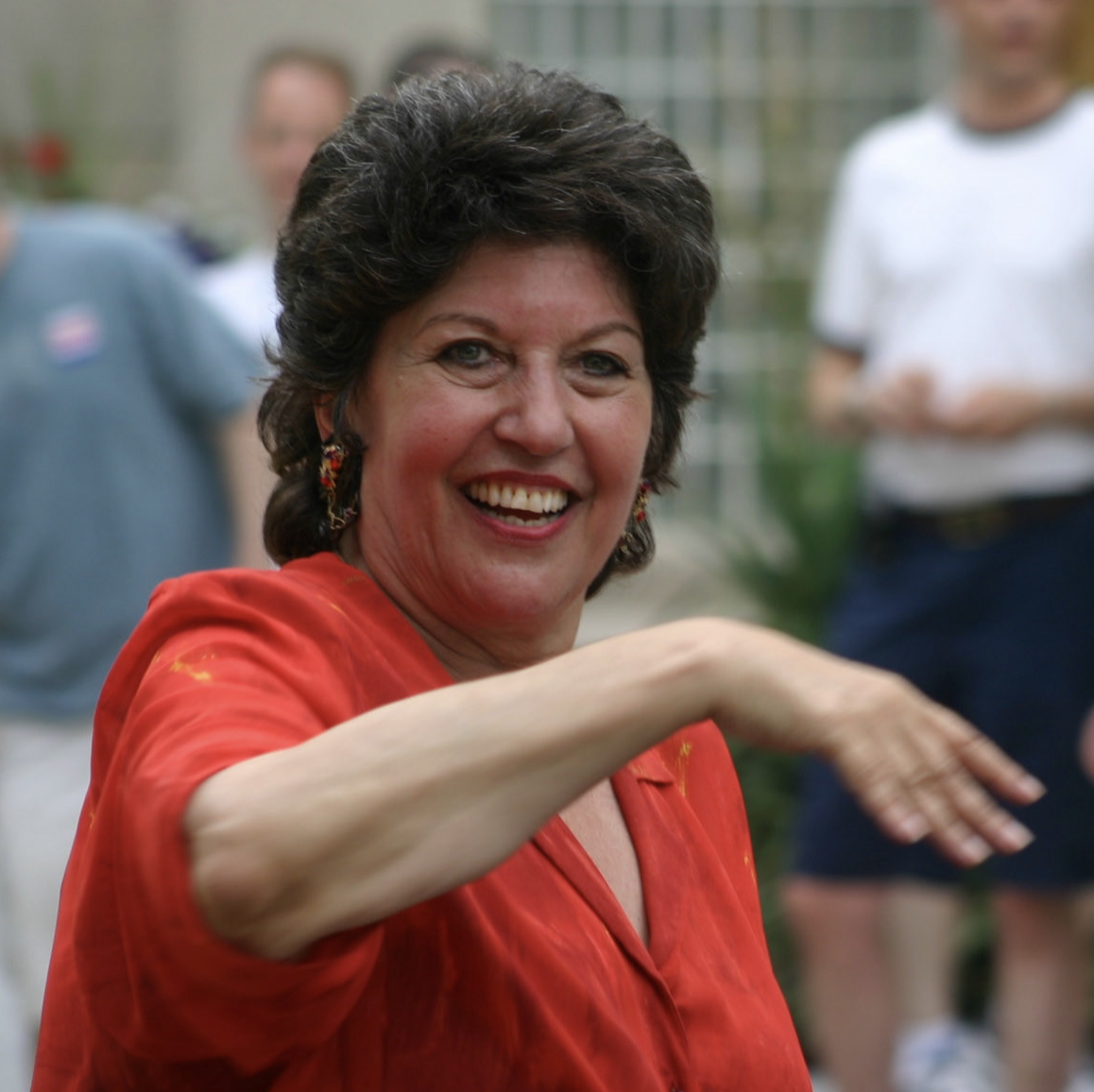

Nominee	Harold Brazil	Carol Schwartz	Sam Jordan
Party	Democratic	Republican	DC Statehood
Popular vote	107,422	73,668	17,557
Percentage	42.85%	29.39%	7.00%
Nominee	Mark Thompson	Valencia Mohammed	James Baxter
Party	Umoja	Independent	Independent
Popular vote	15,796	14,337	13,197
Percentage	6.30%	5.72%	5.26%
Councilmembers before election
John Ray (Dem.)
William Lightfoot (Ind.)
Elected Councilmembers
Harold Brazil (Dem.)
Carol Schwartz (Rep.)

Democratic incumbent John Ray and Independent incumbent William Lightfoot both decided not to run for re-election, and were replaced by Democratic candidate Harold Brazil and Republican candidate Carol Schwartz respectively.

=== Democratic primary ===
Candidates

- Harold Brazil
- John Capozzi
- Ronnie Edwards
- Ernest E. Johnson
- Phil Mendelson
- Kathryn A. Pearson-West
- Paul Savage
- Joseph P. Yeldell

1996 Council of the District of Columbia At-large Democratic primary
Party	Candidate	Votes	%
Democratic	Harold Brazil	17,465	42.01%
Democratic	Joseph P. Yeldell	9,230	22.20%
Democratic	John Capozzi	6,092	14.65%
Democratic	Phil Mendelson	3,117	7.50%
Democratic	Kathryn A. Pearson-West	2,015	4.85%
Democratic	Paul Savage	1,941	4.67%
Democratic	Ronnie Edwards	791	1.90%
Democratic	Ernest E. Johnson	664	1.60%
Write-in		258	0.62%
Total votes		41,573	100%

=== Republican primary ===
Candidates

- Carol Schwartz

1996 Council of the District of Columbia At-large Republican primary
Party	Candidate	Votes	%
Republican	Carol Schwartz	1,819	95.84%
Write-in		79	4.16%
Total votes		1,898	100%

=== Statehood primary ===
Candidates

- Sam Jordan
- Bardyl R. Tirana

1996 Council of the District of Columbia At-large Statehood primary
Party	Candidate	Votes	%
DC Statehood	Sam Jordan	170	77.63%
DC Statehood	Bardyl R. Tirana	29	13.24%
Write-in		20	9.13%
Total votes		219	100%

=== Umoja Primary ===
Candidates

- Mark Thompson

1996 Council of the District of Columbia At-large Umoja primary
Party	Candidate	Votes	%
Umoja	Mark Thompson	87	97.75%
Write-in		2	2.25%
Total votes		89	100%

=== Independents ===
Candidates

- James Baxter
- Ernie Brooks
- Don Folden Sr.
- Robert Hamilton Jr.
- Valencia Mohammed

=== General election ===
1996 Council of the District of Columbia At-large election
Party	Candidate	Votes	%
Democratic	Harold Brazil	107,422	42.85%
Republican	Carol Schwartz	73,668	29.39%
DC Statehood	Sam Jordan	17,557	7.00%
Umoja	Mark Thompson	15,796	6.30%
Independent	Valencia Mohammed	14,337	5.72%
Independent	James Baxter	13,197	5.26%
Independent	Robert Hamilton, Jr.	3,122	1.25%
Independent	Ernie Brooks	3,067	1.22%
Independent	Don Folden, Sr.	1,605	0.64%
Write-in		927	0.37%
Total votes		250,698	100%

== Ward 2 ==
1996 Council of the District of Columbia Ward 2 election
- November 5, 1996
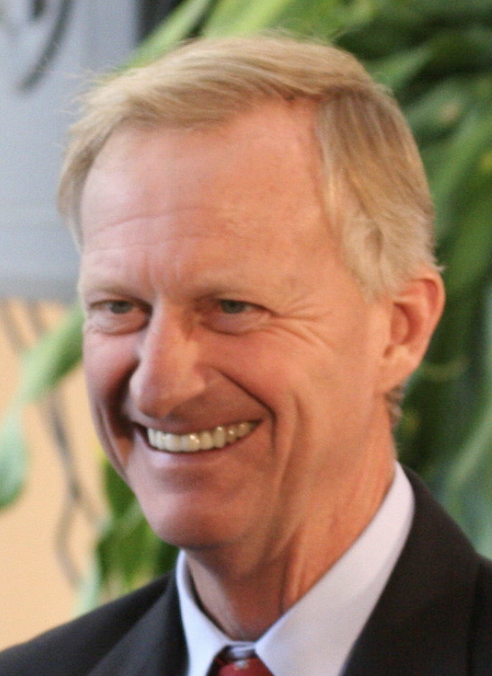

Nominee	Jack Evans	Roger L. Moffatt
Party	Democratic	Republican
Popular vote	16,103	4,240
Percentage	78.60%	20.70%
Councilmember before election
Jack Evans
Democratic
Elected Councilmember
Jack Evans
Democratic

Incumbent councilmember Jack Evans won re-election to his second full term on the Council.

=== Democratic primary ===
Candidates

- Jack Evans
- James McLeod

1996 Council of the District of Columbia Ward 2 Democratic primary
Party	Candidate	Votes	%
Democratic	Jack Evans (inc.)	3,110	77.94%
Democratic	James McLeod	824	20.65%
Write-in		56	1.41%
Total votes		3,990	100%

=== Republican primary ===
Candidates

- Roger L. Moffatt

1996 Council of the District of Columbia Ward 2 Republican primary
Party	Candidate	Votes	%
Republican	Roger L. Moffatt	323	92.02%
Write-in		28	7.98%
Total votes		351	100%

=== General Election ===
1996 Council of the District of Columbia Ward 2 election
Party	Candidate	Votes	%
Democratic	Jack Evans (inc.)	16,103	78.60%
Republican	Roger L. Moffatt	4,240	20.70%
Write-in		145	0.71%
Total votes		20,488	100%

== Ward 4 ==
1996 Council of the District of Columbia Ward 4 election
- November 5, 1996
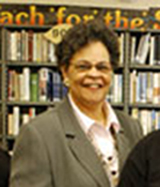

Nominee	Charlene Drew Jarvis	Rick Malachi
Party	Democratic	Umoja
Popular vote	18,291	4,839
Percentage	78.34%	20.73%
Councilmember before election
Charlene Drew Jarvis
Democratic
Elected Councilmember
Charlene Drew Jarvis
Democratic

Incumbent councilmember Charlene Drew Jarvis won re-election to a fourth full term.

=== Democratic primary ===
Candidates

- Charlene Drew Jarvis
- Pat Kidd
- Diane Miller
- Dwight E. Singleton

1996 Council of the District of Columbia Ward 4 Democratic primary
Party	Candidate	Votes	%
Democratic	Charlene Drew Jarvis (inc.)	5,237	52.73%
Democratic	Dwight E. Singleton	2,464	24.81%
Democratic	Diane Miller	1,555	15.66%
Democratic	Pat Kidd	597	6.01%
Write-in		78	0.79%
Total votes		9,931	100%

=== Umoja primary ===
Candidates

- Rick Malachi

1996 Council of the District of Columbia Ward 4 Umoja primary
Party	Candidate	Votes	%
Umoja	Rick Malachi	24	96.00%
Write-in		1	4.00%
Total votes		25	100%

=== General Election ===
1996 Council of the District of Columbia Ward 4 election
Party	Candidate	Votes	%
Democratic	Charlene Drew Jarvis (inc.)	18,291	78.34%
Umoja	Rick Malachi	4,839	20.73%
Write-in		217	0.93%
Total votes		23,347	100%

== Ward 7 ==
1996 Council of the District of Columbia Ward 7 election
- November 5, 1996
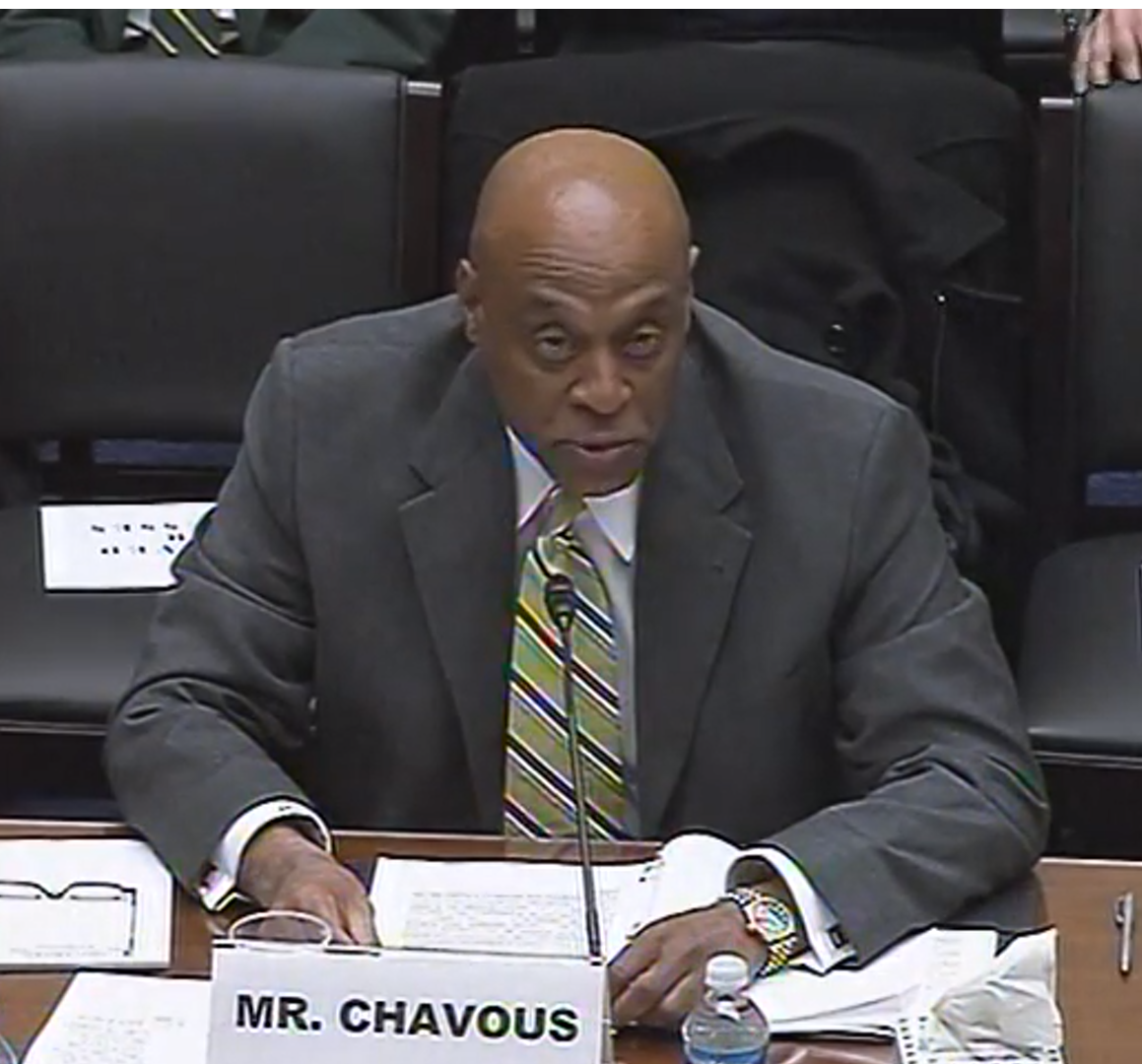

Nominee	Kevin P. Chavous	Durand A. Ford	James Bernard Miles
Party	Democratic	DC Statehood	Republican
Popular vote	16,730	1,175	605
Percentage	89.82%	6.31%	3.25%
Councilmember before election
Kevin P. Chavous
Democratic
Elected Councilmember
Kevin P. Chavous
Democratic

Incumbent councilmember Kevin P. Chavous won re-election to a second full term.

=== Democratic primary ===
Candidates

- Kevin P. Chavous, incumbent Ward 7 Councilmember
- Terry Hairston
- Eddie Rhodes

1996 Council of the District of Columbia Ward 7 Democratic primary
Party	Candidate	Votes	%
Democratic	Kevin P. Chavous (inc.)	4,658	68.28%
Democratic	Terry Hairston	1,647	24.14%
Democratic	Eddie Rhodes	441	6.46%
Write-in		76	1.11%
Total votes		6,822	100%

=== Republican primary ===
No candidates filed for the primary, with James Bernard Miles winning the nomination through write-in votes.

1996 Council of the District of Columbia Ward 7 Republican primary
Party	Candidate	Votes	%
	Write-in	43	100%
Total votes		43	100%

=== Statehood primary ===
Candidates

- Durand A. Ford

1996 Council of the District of Columbia Ward 7 Statehood primary
Party	Candidate	Votes	%
DC Statehood	Durand A. Ford	12	75.00%
Write-in		4	25.00%
Total votes		16	100%

=== General Election ===
1996 Council of the District of Columbia Ward 7 election
Party	Candidate	Votes	%
Democratic	Kevin P. Chavous (inc.)	16,730	89.82%
DC Statehood	Durand A. Ford	1,175	6.31%
Republican	James Bernard Miles	605	3.25%
Write-in		117	0.63%
Total votes		18,627	100%

== Ward 8 ==
1996 Council of the District of Columbia Ward 8 election
- November 5, 1996

Nominee	Sandy Allen	William Lockridge	Rahim Jenkins
Party	Democratic	Independent	Umoja
Popular vote	9,230	1,503	757
Percentage	78.27%	12.75%	6.42%
Councilmember before election
Eydie Whittington
Democratic
Elected Councilmember
Sandy Allen
Democratic

Mayor Marion Barry's preferred candidate Eydie Whittington lost his re-election bid after serving for a little more than a year to Sandy Allen, who had lost in the 1995 special election to Whittington by two votes

=== Democratic primary ===
Candidates

- Sandy Allen, former Marion Barry staffer
- Lafayette A. Barnes
- Ray Bell
- Winifred Freeman
- Paul Lamont Simms
- Leonard Watson Sr.
- Eydie Whittington, incumbent Ward 8 Councilmember

1996 Council of the District of Columbia Ward 8 Democratic primary
Party	Candidate	Votes	%
Democratic	Sandy Allen	1,746	39.98%
Democratic	Eydie Whittington (inc.)	1,425	32.63%
Democratic	Lafayette A. Barnes	708	16.21%
Democratic	Ray Bell	199	4.56%
Democratic	Leonard Watson Sr.	139	3.18%
Democratic	Paul Lamont Simms	87	1.99%
Democratic	Winifred Freeman	52	1.19%
Write-in		11	0.25%
Total votes		9,333	100%

=== Republican primary ===
Candidates

- W. Cardell Shelton

1996 Council of the District of Columbia Ward 8 Republican primary
Party	Candidate	Votes	%
Republican	W. Cardell Shelton	34	79.07%
Write-in		9	20.93%
Total votes		43	100%

=== Independents ===
Candidates

- Jephunneh Lawrence
- William Lockridge

=== General Election ===
1996 Council of the District of Columbia Ward 8 election
Party	Candidate	Votes	%
Democratic	Sandy Allen	9,230	78.27%
Independent	William Lockridge	1,503	12.75%
Umoja	Rahim Jenkins	757	6.42%
Republican	W. Cardell Shelton	173	1.47%
Independent	Jephunneh Lawrence	104	0.88%
Write-in		25	0.21%
Total votes		11,792	100%
