= 2004 Council of the District of Columbia election =

- November 2, 2004

6 seats on the Council of the District of Columbia 7 seats needed for a majority
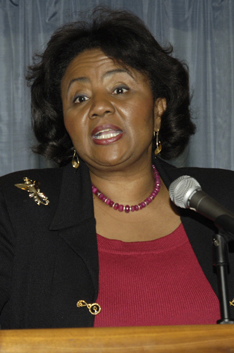

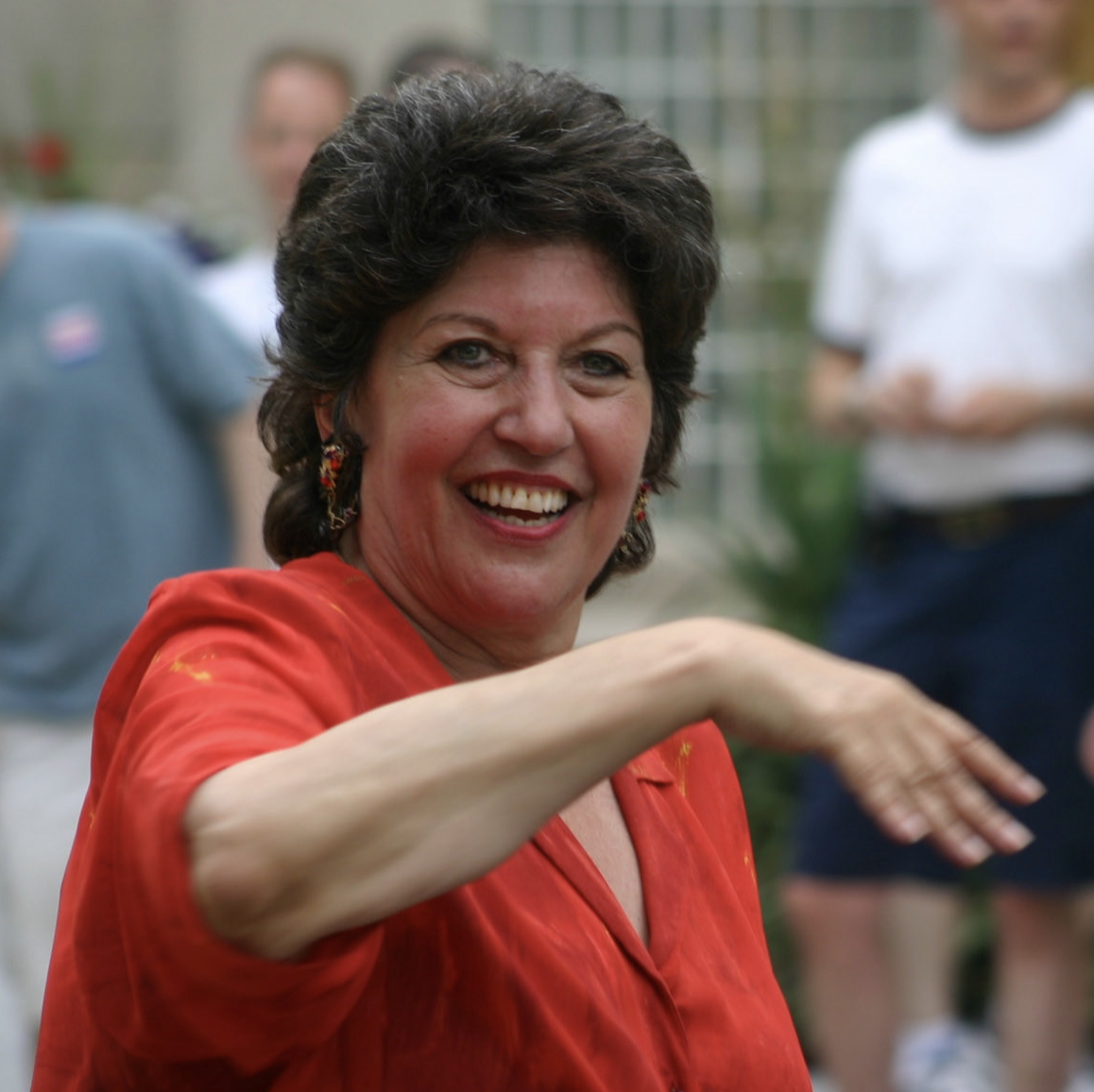

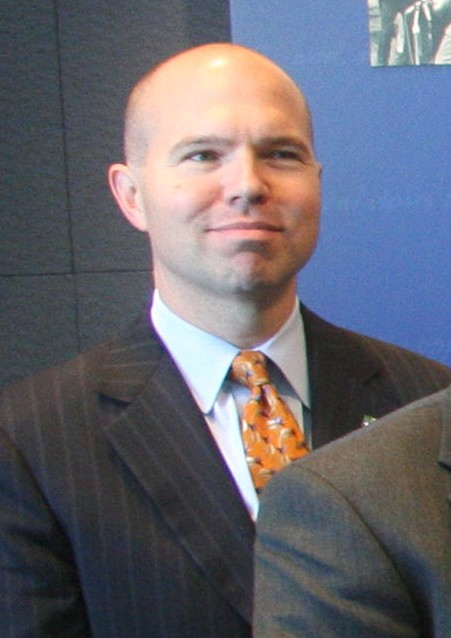
	Majority party	Minority party	Third party
Leader	Linda Cropp	Carol Schwartz	David Catania
Party	Democratic	Republican	Independent
Seats before	11	1	1
Seats after	11	1	1
Seat change	Steady	Steady	Steady

The 2004 Council of the District of Columbia election was held on November 2, with primaries taking place on September 14. Half of the councilmembers up for re-election were defeated in their primaries, specifically At-large Councilmember Harold Brazil, Ward 7 Councilmember Kevin Chavous, and Ward 8 Councilmember Sandy Allen.

Former Mayor Marion Barry returned to the Council again following his decision to not run for a fifth mayoral term in 1998.

== Summary ==
Democrats retained their 11 seats and remained the largest party on the Council, with no seats being lost to other parties or independents. Republicans kept their single seat following David Catania's decision to leave the party and become an independent in the summer of 2004.

=== At-large ===
Position	Incumbent				Candidates
Position	Member	Party	First elected	Status	Candidates
At-large	Harold Brazil	Democratic	1996	Incumbent lost re-election New member elected. Democratic hold.	▌ ✓ Kwame Brown 55.4%; ▌ ✓ Carol Schwartz 30.9%; ▌ Laurent Ross 7.7%; ▌ Tony Dominguez 5.4%
At-large	Carol Schwartz	Republican	1996	Incumbent re-elected.	▌ ✓ Kwame Brown 55.4%; ▌ ✓ Carol Schwartz 30.9%; ▌ Laurent Ross 7.7%; ▌ Tony Dominguez 5.4%

=== Wards ===
Position	Incumbent				Candidates
Position	Member	Party	First elected	Status	Candidates
Ward 2	Jack Evans	Democratic	1991 (special)	Incumbent re-elected.	▌ ✓ Jack Evans 82.4%; ▌ Jesse James Price Sr. 9,2%; ▌ Jay Houston Marx 8.0%
Ward 4	Adrian Fenty	Democratic	2000	Incumbent re-elected.	▌ ✓ Adrian Fenty 98.9%
Ward 7	Kevin P. Chavous	Democratic	1992	Incumbent lost re-election New member elected. Democratic hold.	▌ ✓ Vincent Gray 91.5%; ▌ Michele Tingling-Clemmons 4.5%; ▌ Jerod Tolson 1.9%
Ward 8	Sandy Allen	Democratic	1995 (special)	Incumbent lost re-election New member elected. Democratic hold.	▌ ✓ Marion Barry 94.9%; ▌ Cardell Shelton 4.2%

== At-large ==
2004 Council of the District of Columbia At-large election
- November 2, 2004
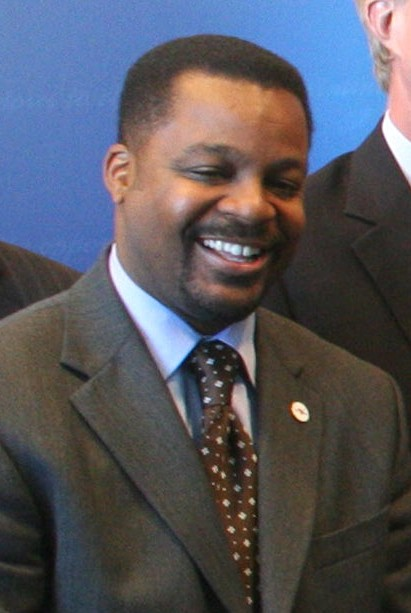

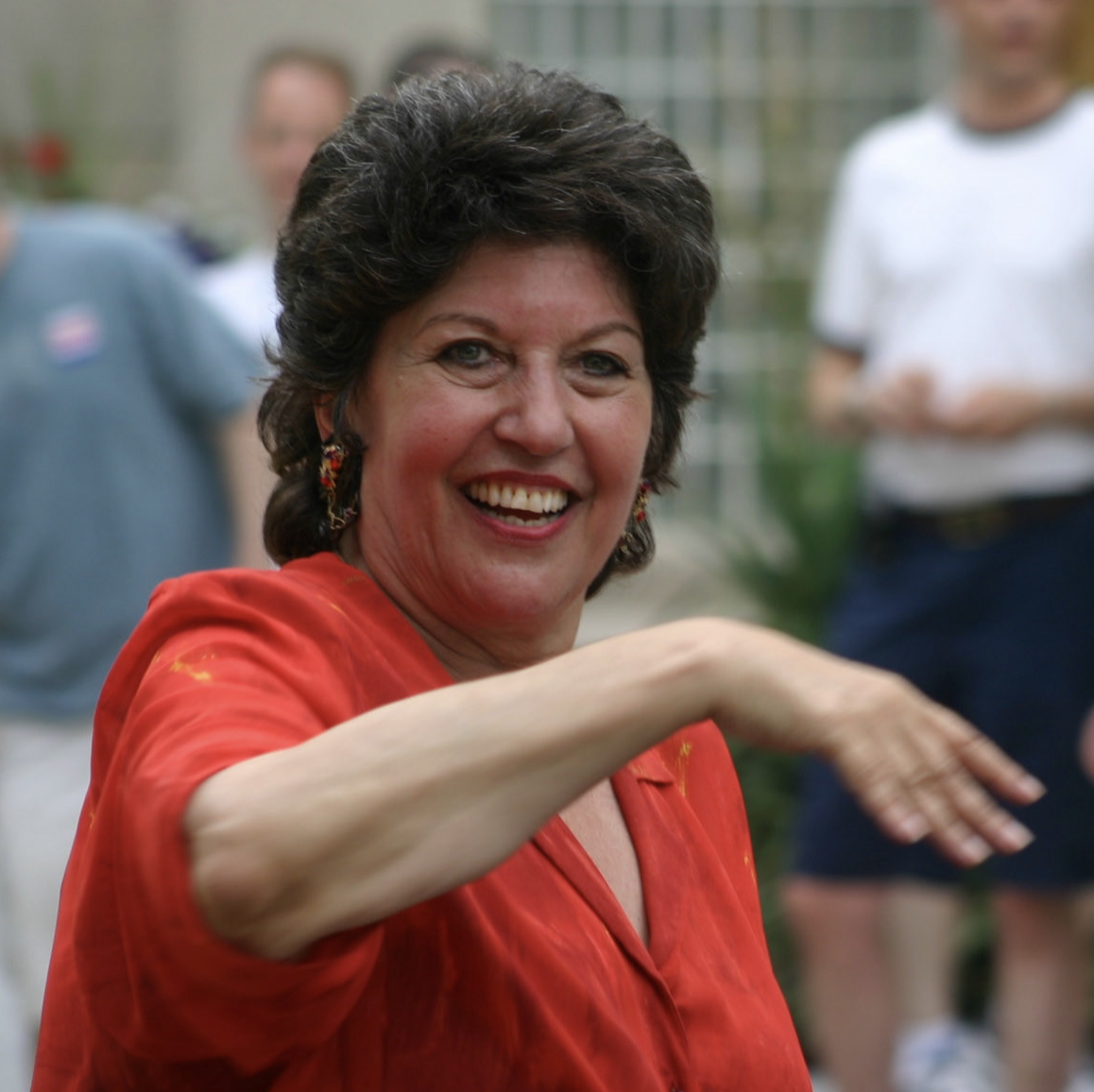

Nominee	Kwame Brown	Carol Schwartz
Party	Democratic	Republican
Popular vote	167,981	93,743
Percentage	55.40%	30.93%
Nominee	Laurent Ross	Tony Dominguez
Party	DC Statehood Green	Independent
Popular vote	23,322	16,359
Percentage	7.70%	5.40%
Councilmembers before election
Harold Brazil (Dem.)
Carol Schwartz (Rep.)
Elected Councilmembers
Kwame Brown (Dem.)
Carol Schwartz (Rep.)

Incumbent Democratic Councilmember Harold Brazil lost his primary to challenger Kwame Brown, while incumbent Republican Carol Schwartz won re-election to her third full term.

=== Democratic primary ===
Candidates

- Harold Brazil, incumbent At-large Councilmember
- Sam Brooks, political campaign staffer
- Kwame Brown, business executive

Endorsements

Harold Brazil

Local officials

- Anthony Williams, Mayor of the District of Columbia

Organizations

- District of Columbia Democratic State Committee
- Greater Washington Board of Trade

Publications

- The Washington Post
Sam Brooks

Publications

- The Georgetown Voice
Kwame Brown

Labor unions

- AFL-CIO Metropolitan Washington Council

Organizations

- Sierra Club

2004 Council of the District of Columbia At-large Democratic primary
Party	Candidate	Votes	%
Democratic	Kwame Brown	32,522	54.09%
Democratic	Harold Brazil (inc.)	19,505	32.44%
Democratic	Sam Brooks	7,850	13.06%
Write-in		249	0.41%
Total votes		60,126	100%

=== Republican primary ===
Candidates

- Don Folden Sr., Metrobus operator
- Robert Pittman, community activist
- Carol Schwartz, incumbent At-large Councilmember

Endorsements

Carol Schwartz

Organizations

- Sierra Club

Publications

- The Georgetown Voice
- The Washington Post

2004 Council of the District of Columbia At-large Republican primary
Party	Candidate	Votes	%
Republican	Carol Schwartz (inc.)	1,958	82.69%
Republican	Robert Pittman	266	11.23%
Republican	Don Folden Sr.	76	3.21%
Write-in		68	2.87%
Total votes		2,368	100%

=== Statehood Green primary ===
Candidates

- Laurent Ross, community activist

2004 Council of the District of Columbia At-large Statehood Green primary
Party	Candidate	Votes	%
DC Statehood Green	Laurent Ross	297	78.99%
Write-in		79	21.01%
Total votes		276	100%

=== Independents ===
Candidates

- Tony Dominguez, DC government employee

=== General election ===
2004 Council of the District of Columbia At-large election
Party	Candidate	Votes	%
Democratic	Kwame Brown	167,891	55.40%
Republican	Carol Schwartz (inc.)	93,743	30.93%
DC Statehood Green	Laurent Ross	23,322	7.70%
Independent	Tony Dominguez	16,359	5.40%
Write-in		1,732	0.57%
Total votes		303,047	100%

== Ward 2 ==
2004 Council of the District of Columbia Ward 2 election
- November 2, 2004
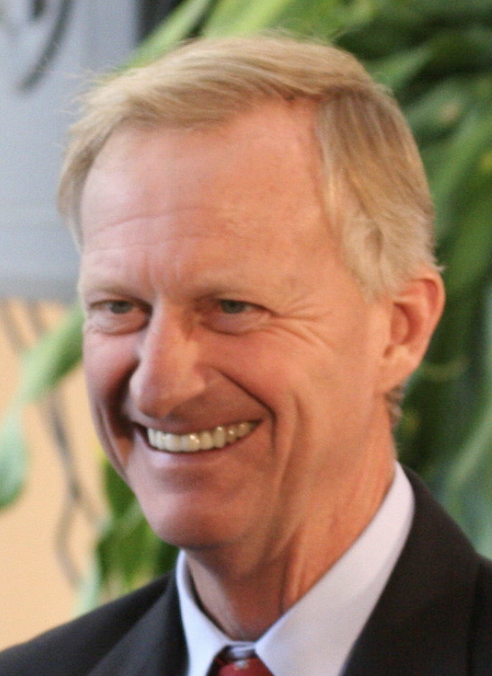

Nominee	Jack Evans	Jesse James Price Sr.	Jay Houston Marx
Party	Democratic	Republican	DC Statehood Green
Popular vote	19,053	2,133	1,838
Percentage	82.39%	9.22%	7.95%
Councilmember before election
Jack Evans
Democratic
Elected Councilmember
Jack Evans
Democratic

Incumbent councilmember Jack Evans won re-election to his fourth full term on the Council.

=== Democratic primary ===
Candidates

- Jack Evans, incumbent Ward 2 Councilmember

Endorsements

Jack Evans

Local officials

- Anthony Williams, Mayor of the District of Columbia

Organizations

- Capital Stonewall Democrats
- Sierra Club

Publications

- The Georgetown Voice
- The Washington Post

2004 Council of the District of Columbia Ward 2 Democratic primary
Party	Candidate	Votes	%
Democratic	Jack Evans (inc.)	4,116	95.83%
Write-in		179	4.17%
Total votes		4,295	100%

=== Republican primary ===
No candidates filed for the primary, with Jesse James Price Sr. winning the nomination through write-in votes.

2004 Council of the District of Columbia Ward 2 Republican primary
Party	Candidate	Votes	%
	Write-in	70	100%
Total votes		70	100%

=== Statehood Green primary ===
Candidates

- Jay Houston Marx, administrative consultant

2004 Council of the District of Columbia Ward 2 Statehood Green primary
Party	Candidate	Votes	%
DC Statehood Green	Jay Houston Marx	30	90.91%
Write-in		3	9.09%
Total votes		33	100%

=== General election ===
2004 Council of the District of Columbia Ward 2 election
Party	Candidate	Votes	%
Democratic	Jack Evans (inc.)	19,053	82.39%
Republican	Jesse James Price Sr.	2,133	9.22%
DC Statehood Green	Sam Houston Marx	1,838	7.95%
Write-in		101	0.44%
Total votes		23,125	100%

== Ward 4 ==
2004 Council of the District of Columbia Ward 4 election
- November 2, 2004
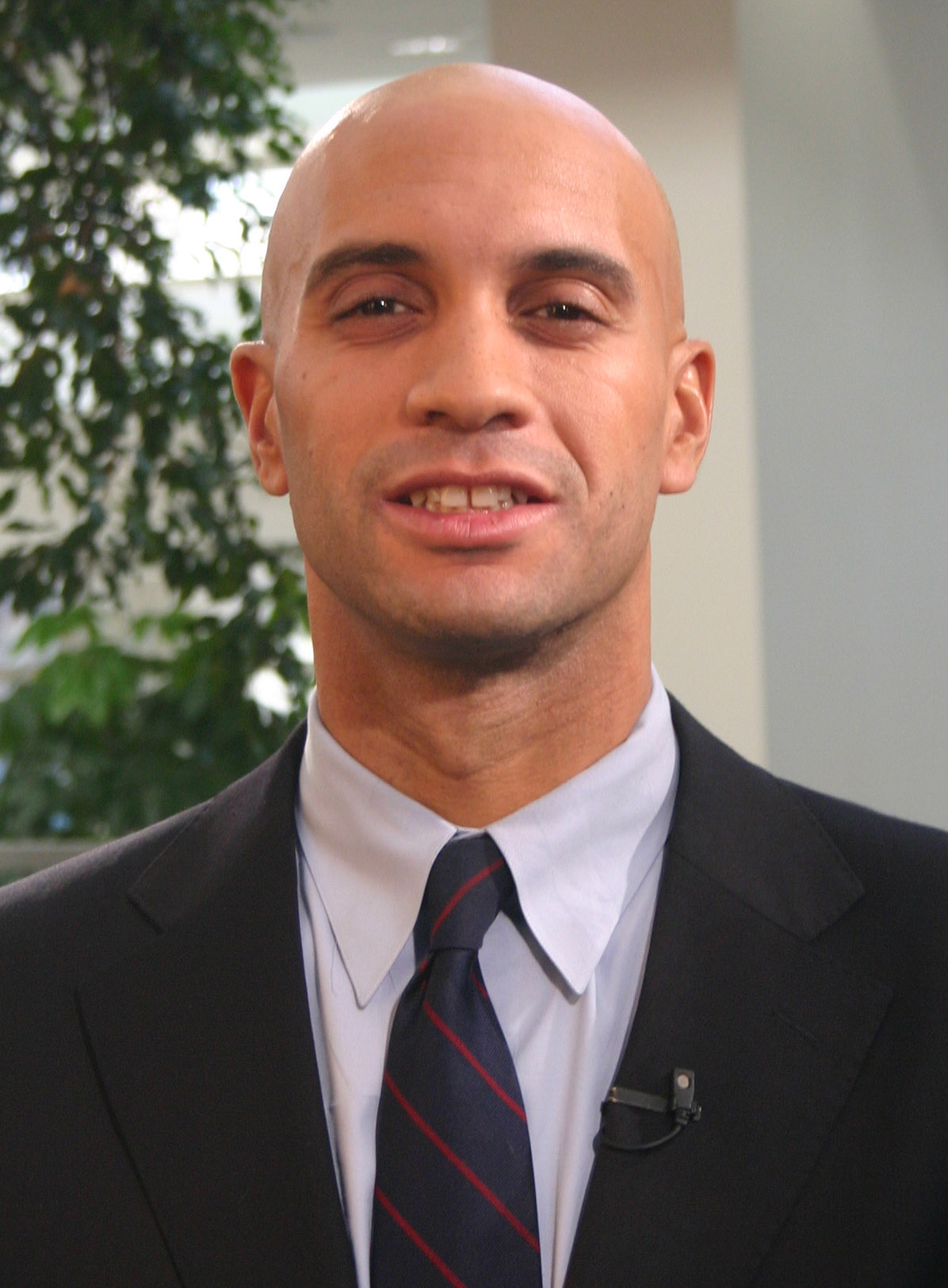
Nominee	Adrian Fenty
Party	Democratic
Popular vote	30,530
Percentage	98.92%
Councilmember before election
Adrian Fenty
Democratic
Elected Councilmember
Adrian Fenty
Democratic

No opponents filed at any level for the Ward 4 seat, with the election being merely a formality to future mayor Adrian Fenty's bid for a second term.

=== Democratic primary ===
Candidates

- Adrian Fenty, incumbent Ward 4 Councilmember

Endorsements

Adrian Fenty

Organizations

- Capital Stonewall Democrats

Publications

- The Washington Post

2004 Council of the District of Columbia Ward 4 Democratic primary
Party	Candidate	Votes	%
Democratic	Adrian Fenty (inc.)	11,659	98.76%
Write-in		146	1.24%
Total votes		11,805	100%

=== General Election ===
2004 Council of the District of Columbia Ward 4 election
Party	Candidate	Votes	%
Democratic	Adrian Fenty (inc.)	30,530	98.92%
Write-in		334	1.08%
Total votes		30,864	100%

== Ward 7 ==
2004 Council of the District of Columbia Ward 7 election
- November 2, 2004
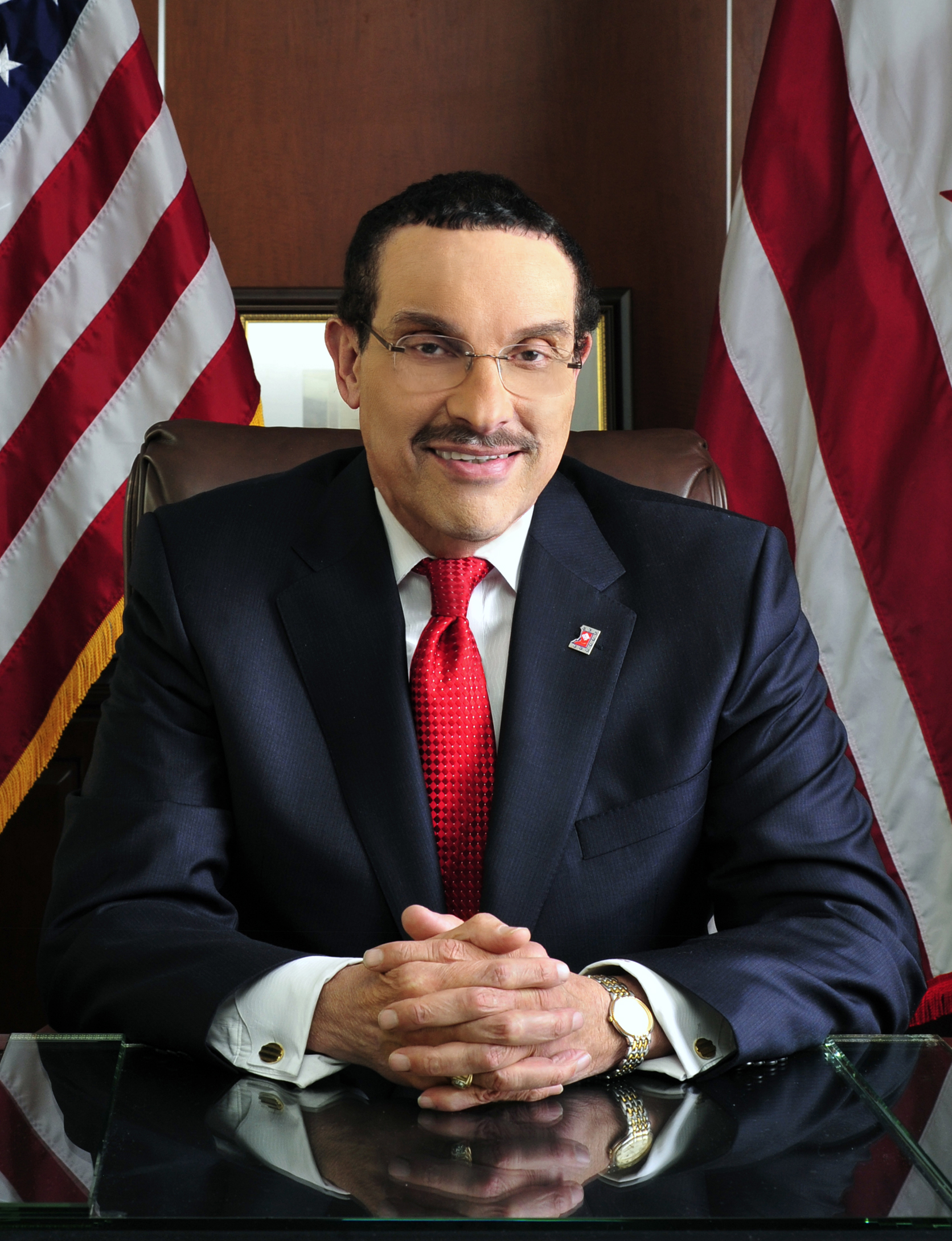

Nominee	Vincent Gray	Michele Tingling-Clemmons	Jerod Tolson
Party	Democratic	DC Statehood Green	Republican
Popular vote	24,206	1,198	491
Percentage	91.46%	4.53%	1.86%
Councilmember before election
Kevin P. Chavous
Democratic
Elected Councilmember
Vincent Gray
Democratic

Incumbent Councilmember Kevin Chavous lost his primary election to challenger and future mayor Vincent Gray, who won overwhelmingly in the general election.

=== Democratic primary ===
Candidates

- Kevin P. Chavous, incumbent Ward 7 Councilmember
- Donna E. Daniels
- Mia Hairston-Hamilton
- Mary D. Jackson, United States Senate archivist
- James Johnson Jr.
- Vincent Gray, president of Ward 7 Democrats

Endorsements

Kevin P. Chavous

Publications

- The Washington Post
Vincent Gray

Organizations

- Capital Stonewall Democrats
- District of Columbia Democratic State Committee
- Sierra Club

2004 Council of the District of Columbia Ward 7 Democratic primary
Party	Candidate	Votes	%
Democratic	Vincent Gray	5,342	50.02%
Democratic	Kevin P. Chavous (inc.)	3,631	34.00%
Democratic	Mia Hairston-Hamilton	1,086	10.17%
Democratic	Mary D. Jackson	463	4.34%
Democratic	Donna E. Daniels	72	0.67%
Democratic	James Johnson Jr.	67	0.63%
Write-in		18	0.17%
Total votes		10,679	100%

=== Republican primary ===
Candidates

- Jerod Tolson, business owner

2004 Council of the District of Columbia Ward 7 Republican primary
Party	Candidate	Votes	%
Republican	Jerod Tolson	104	79.39%
Write-in		27	20.61%
Total votes		131	100%

=== Statehood Green primary ===
Candidates

- Michele Tingling-Clemmons, administrative consultant

2004 Council of the District of Columbia Ward 7 Statehood Green primary
Party	Candidate	Votes	%
DC Statehood Green	Michele Tingling-Clemmons	26	68.42%
Write-in		12	31.58%
Total votes		38	100%

=== General Election ===
2004 Council of the District of Columbia Ward 7 election
Party	Candidate	Votes	%
Democratic	Vincent Gray	24,206	91.46%
DC Statehood Green	Michele Tingling-Clemmons	1,198	4.53%
Republican	Johnnie Scott Rice	491	1.86%
Write-in		571	2.16%
Total votes		26,466	100%

== Ward 8 ==
2004 Council of the District of Columbia Ward 8 election
- November 2, 2004
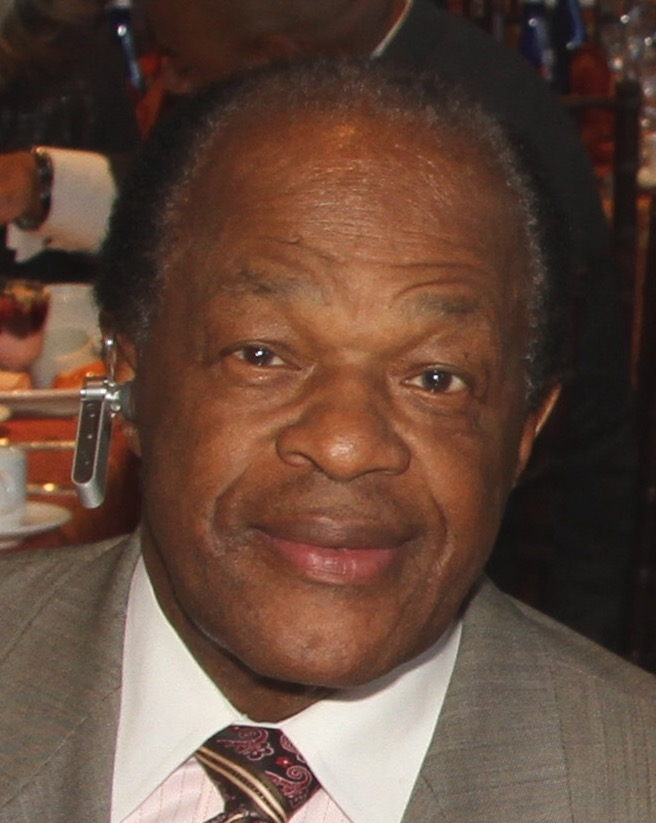

Nominee	Marion Barry	Cardell Shelton
Party	Democratic	Republican
Popular vote	19,333	861
Percentage	94.94%	4.23%
Councilmember before election
Sandy Allen
Democratic
Elected Councilmember
Marion Barry
Democratic

Former mayor Marion Barry returned to District government as the Ward 8 Councilmember, roundly beating incumbent Sandy Allen in the Democratic primary and cruising to victory in the general election. Allen had been endorsed by the entire Council except for Vincent Orange along with multiple former Councilmembers.

=== Democratic primary ===
Candidates

- Sandy Allen, incumbent Ward 8 Councilmember
- Marion Barry, former Mayor and Councilmember
- William O. Lockridge, Ward 8 member of the District of Columbia Board of Education
- Jacque D. Patterson, Advisory Neighborhood Commission
- Joyce Scott, apartment building superintendent
- Sandra Seegars, former DC Taxicab commissioner
- Frank Sewell

Endorsements

Sandy Allen

Individuals

- H. R. Crawford, former Ward 7 Councilmember (1981-1993)
- George Augustus Stallings Jr., founder of the African-American Catholic Congregation
- Nadine Winter, former Ward 6 Councilmember (1975-1991)

Local officials

- Sharon Ambrose, incumbent Ward 6 Councilmember
- Harold Brazil, incumbent Democratic At-large Councilmember
- David Catania, incumbent Independent At-large Councilmember
- Kevin P. Chavous, incumbent Ward 7 Councilmember
- Linda Cropp, incumbent Council Chair
- Jack Evans, incumbent Ward 2 Councilmember
- Adrian Fenty, incumbent Ward 4 Councilmember
- Jim Graham, incumbent Ward 1 Councilmember
- Phil Mendelson, incumbent Democratic At-large Councilmember
- Kathleen Patterson, incumbent Ward 3 Councilmember
- Carol Schwartz, incumbent Republican At-large Councilmember

Organizations

- Capital Stonewall Democrats

Publications

- The Washington Post

2004 Council of the District of Columbia Ward 8 Democratic primary
Party	Candidate	Votes	%
Democratic	Marion Barry	5,022	57.81%
Democratic	Sandy Allen (inc.)	2,137	24.60%
Democratic	William O. Lockridge	638	7.34%
Democratic	Sandra Seegars	412	4.74%
Democratic	Jacque D. Patterson	350	4.03%
Democratic	Joyce Scott	68	0.78%
Democratic	Frank Sewell	41	0.47%
Write-in		19	0.22%
Total votes		8,687	100%

=== Republican primary ===
Candidates

- Cardell Shelton, building inspector

2004 Council of the District of Columbia Ward 8 Republican primary
Party	Candidate	Votes	%
Republican	Cardell Shelton	44	60.27%
Write-in		29	39.73%
Total votes		73	100%

=== General Election ===
2004 Council of the District of Columbia Ward 8 election
Party	Candidate	Votes	%
Democratic	Marion Barry	19,333	94.94%
Republican	Cardell Shelton	861	4.23%
Write-in		170	0.83%
Total votes		20,364	100%
