= 2000 Council of the District of Columbia election =

- November 7, 2000

6 seats on the Council of the District of Columbia 7 seats needed for a majority
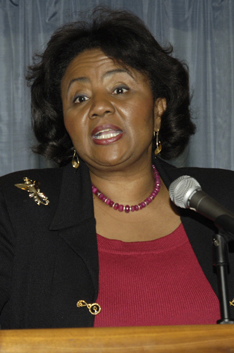

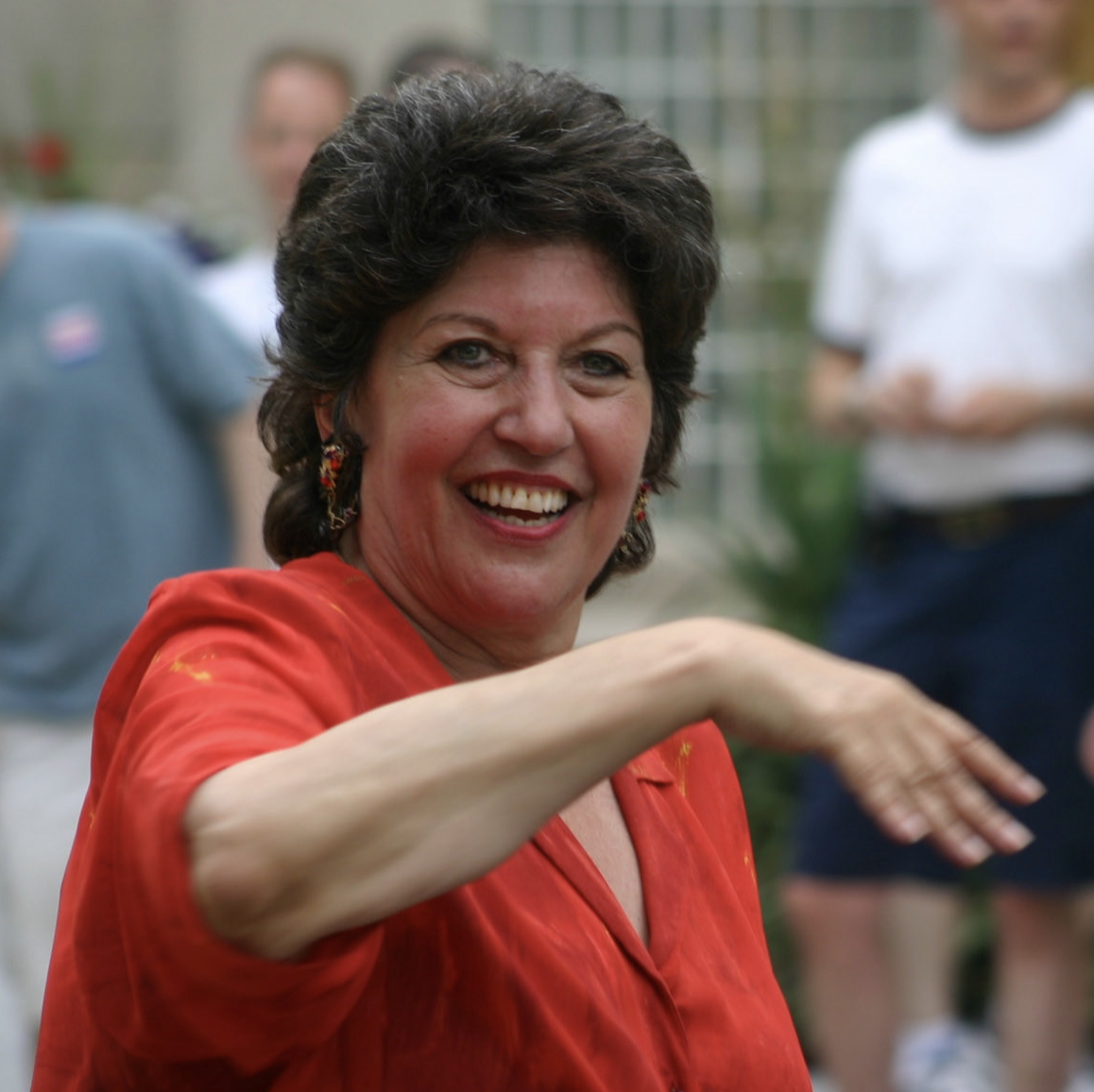
| | Majority party | Minority party |
|---|---|---|
| Leader | Linda Cropp | Carol Schwartz |
| Party | Democratic | Republican |
| Seats before | 11 | 2 |
| Seats after | 11 | 2 |
| Seat change | Steady | Steady |

The 2000 Council of the District of Columbia election was held on November 7, with primaries taking place on September 12. All members up for election were re-elected except for Ward 4 Councilmember Charlene Drew Jarvis, who was beaten in her primary by future mayor Adrian Fenty in his first attempt at running for Council.

This was the first election contested by the new D.C. Statehood Green Party, formed by a combination of the former stalwart D.C. Statehood Party and the upstart D.C. Green Party.

== Summary ==
Democrats retained their 11 seats and remained the largest party on the Council, with no seats being lost to other parties or independents. Republicans kept their two seats.

=== At-large ===
| Position | Incumbent | | | | Candidates |
| Position | Member | Party | First elected | Status | Candidates |
|---|---|---|---|---|---|
| At-large | Harold Brazil | Democratic | 1996 | Incumbent re-elected. | ▌ ✓ Harold Brazil 50.9%; ▌ ✓ Carol Schwartz 29.4%; ▌ Arturo Griffiths 10.7%; ▌ Daphne M. McBryde 3.9%; ▌ Chris Ray 2.4%; ▌ Matthew G. Mercurio 2.2% |
| At-large | Carol Schwartz | Republican | 1996 | Incumbent re-elected. | ▌ ✓ Harold Brazil 50.9%; ▌ ✓ Carol Schwartz 29.4%; ▌ Arturo Griffiths 10.7%; ▌ Daphne M. McBryde 3.9%; ▌ Chris Ray 2.4%; ▌ Matthew G. Mercurio 2.2% |

=== Wards ===
| Position | Incumbent | | | | Candidates |
| Position | Member | Party | First elected | Status | Candidates |
|---|---|---|---|---|---|
| Ward 2 | Jack Evans | Democratic | 1991 (special) | Incumbent re-elected. | ▌ ✓ Jack Evans 79.8%; ▌ Tom Briggs 19.5% |
| Ward 4 | Charlene Drew Jarvis | Democratic | 1979 (special) | Incumbent lost re-election New member elected. Democratic hold. | ▌ ✓ Adrian Fenty 89.1%; ▌ Renee Bowser 10.6% |
| Ward 7 | Kevin P. Chavous | Democratic | 1992 | Incumbent re-elected. | ▌ ✓ Kevin P. Chavous 87.7%; ▌ Johnnie Scott Rice 11.6% |
| Ward 8 | Sandy Allen | Democratic | 1995 (special) | Incumbent re-elected. | ▌ ✓ Sandy Allen 92.2% |

== At-large ==
2000 Council of the District of Columbia At-large election
- November 7, 2000
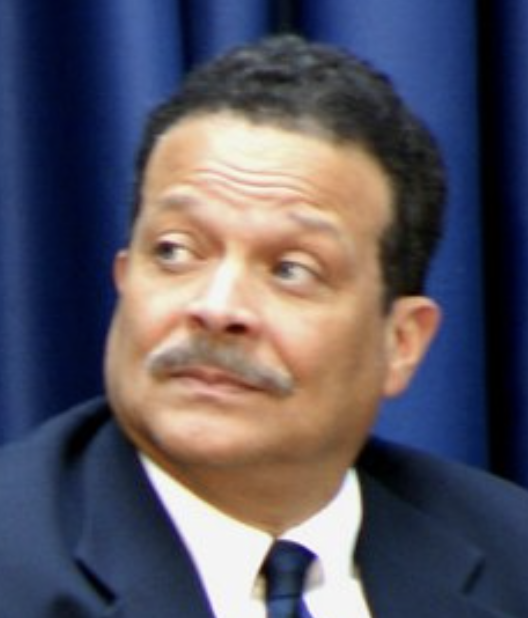

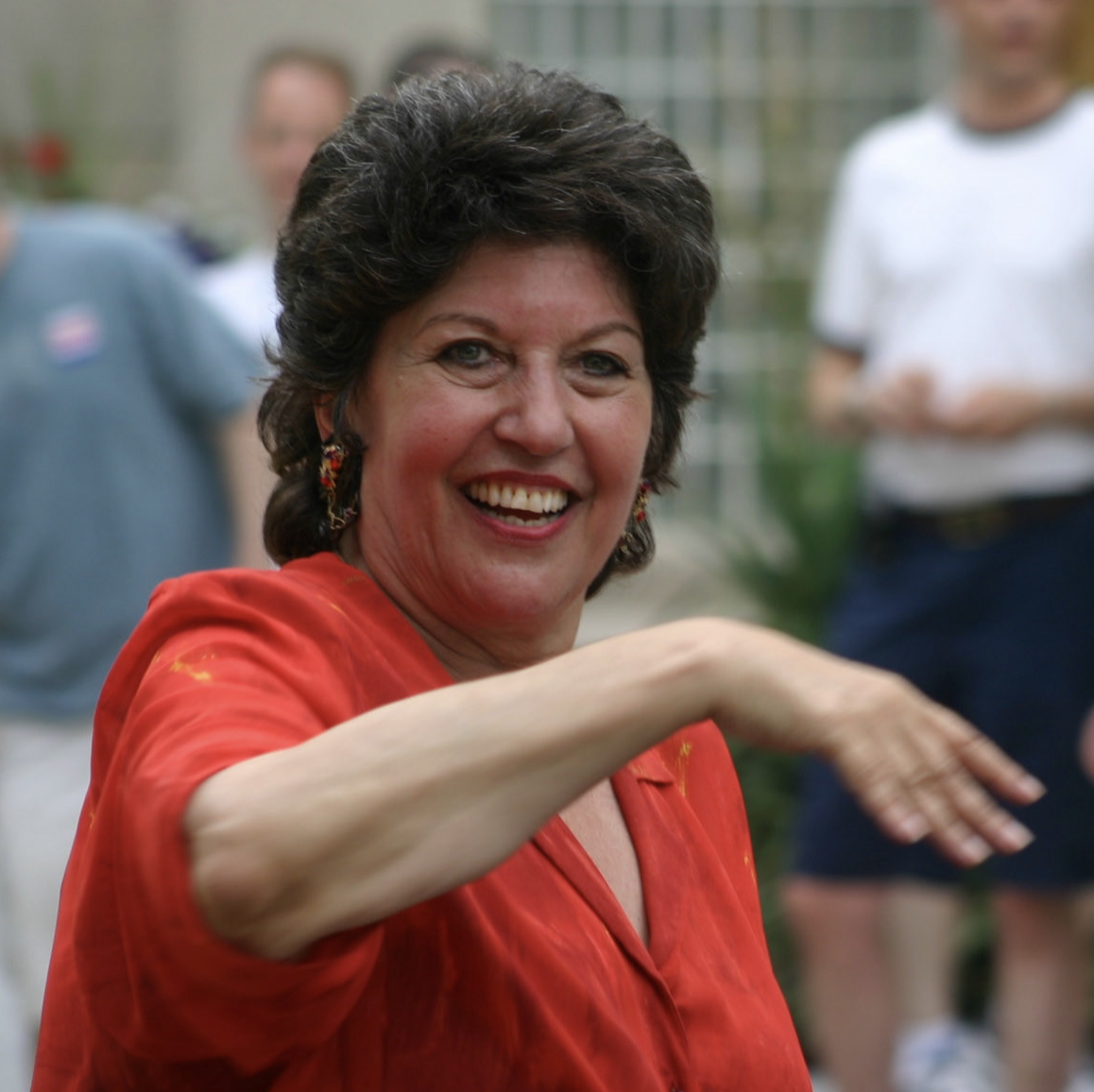

| Nominee | Harold Brazil | Carol Schwartz | Arturo Griffiths |
| Party | Democratic | Republican | DC Statehood Green |
| Popular vote | 131,760 | 76,193 | 27,767 |
| Percentage | 50.91% | 29.43% | 10.73% |
| Nominee | Daphne M. McBryde | Chris Ray | Matthew G. Mercurio |
| Party | Independent | Independent | Libertarian |
| Popular vote | 10,191 | 6,259 | 5,771 |
| Percentage | 3.94% | 2.42% | 2.23% |
Councilmembers before election
Harold Brazil (Dem.)
Carol Schwartz (Rep.)
Elected Councilmembers
Harold Brazil (Dem.)
Carol Schwartz (Rep.)

Incumbent councilmembers Harold Brazil and Carol Schwartz were both reelected to their second full terms.

=== Democratic primary ===
Candidates

- Harold Brazil, incumbent At-large Councilmember

2000 Council of the District of Columbia At-large Democratic primary
| Party | Candidate | Votes | % |
|---|---|---|---|
| Democratic | Harold Brazil (inc.) | 28,869 | 93.45% |
| Write-in | | 2,022 | 6.55% |
| Total votes | | 30.891 | 100% |

=== Republican primary ===
Candidates

- Carol Schwartz, incumbent At-large Councilmember

Endorsements

Carol Schwartz

Labor unions

- American Federation of State, County and Municipal Employees local 20

2000 Council of the District of Columbia At-large Republican primary
| Party | Candidate | Votes | % |
|---|---|---|---|
| Republican | Carol Schwartz (inc.) | 1,466 | 97.15% |
| Write-in | | 43 | 2.85% |
| Total votes | | 1,509 | 100% |

=== Statehood Green primary ===
Candidates

- Arturo Griffiths, community organizer and consultant for the Center for Community Change

Endorsements

Arturo Griffiths

Organizations

- Metro DC Democratic Socialists of America

2000 Council of the District of Columbia At-large Statehood Green primary
| Party | Candidate | Votes | % |
|---|---|---|---|
| DC Statehood Green | Arturo Griffiths | 170 | 92.90% |
| Write-in | | 13 | 7.10% |
| Total votes | | 183 | 100% |

=== Independents ===
Candidates

- Daphne M. McBryde, former staffer of the District of Columbia Financial Control Board
- Chris Ray, Advisory Neighborhood Commissioner for 7B02

Endorsements

Daphne M. McBryde

Labor unions

- American Federation of State, County and Municipal Employees local 20

=== General election ===
2000 Council of the District of Columbia At-large election
| Party | Candidate | Votes | % |
|---|---|---|---|
| Democratic | Harold Brazil | 131,760 | 50.91% |
| Republican | Carol Schwartz | 76,173 | 29.43% |
| DC Statehood Green | Arturo Griffiths | 27,767 | 10.73% |
| Independent | Daphne M. McBryde | 10,191 | 3.94% |
| Independent | Chris Ray | 6,259 | 2.42% |
| Libertarian | Matthew G. Mercurio | 5,771 | 2.23% |
| Write-in | | 927 | 0.37% |
| Total votes | | 250,698 | 100% |

== Ward 2 ==
2000 Council of the District of Columbia Ward 2 election
- November 7, 2000
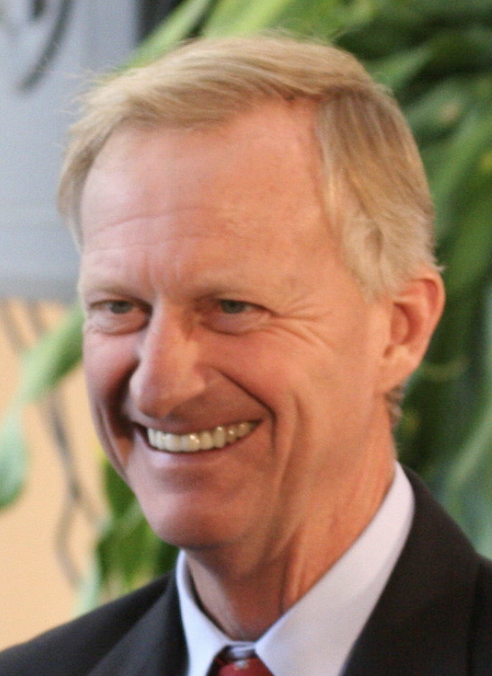

| Nominee | Jack Evans | Tom Briggs |
| Party | Democratic | DC Statehood Green |
| Popular vote | 18,187 | 4,450 |
| Percentage | 79.82% | 19.53% |
Councilmember before election
Jack Evans
Democratic
Elected Councilmember
Jack Evans
Democratic

Incumbent councilmember Jack Evans won re-election to his third full term on the Council.

=== Democratic primary ===
Candidates

- Ray Avrutis, author
- Jack Evans, incumbent Ward 2 Councilmember
- John Fanning, public relations consultant
- Pete Ross, furniture businessman

Endorsements

Jack Evans

Labor unions

- American Federation of State, County and Municipal Employees local 20

2000 Council of the District of Columbia Ward 2 Democratic primary
| Party | Candidate | Votes | % |
|---|---|---|---|
| Democratic | Jack Evans (inc.) | 3,298 | 66.26% |
| Democratic | John Fanning | 892 | 17.92% |
| Democratic | Pete Ross | 720 | 14.47% |
| Democratic | Ray Avrutis | 43 | 0.86% |
| Write-in | | 24 | 0.48% |
| Total votes | | 4,977 | 100% |

=== Statehood Green primary ===
Candidates

- Tom Briggs, Dunbar High School teacher

Endorsements

Tom Briggs

Organizations

- Metro DC Democratic Socialists of America

2000 Council of the District of Columbia Ward 2 Statehood Green primary
| Party | Candidate | Votes | % |
|---|---|---|---|
| DC Statehood Green | Tom Briggs | 13 | 86.67% |
| Write-in | | 2 | 13.33% |
| Total votes | | 15 | 100% |

=== General Election ===
2000 Council of the District of Columbia Ward 2 election
| Party | Candidate | Votes | % |
|---|---|---|---|
| Democratic | Jack Evans (inc.) | 18,187 | 79.82% |
| DC Statehood Green | Tom Briggs | 4,450 | 19.53% |
| Write-in | | 148 | 0.65% |
| Total votes | | 22,785 | 100% |

== Ward 4 ==
2000 Council of the District of Columbia Ward 4 election
- November 7, 2000
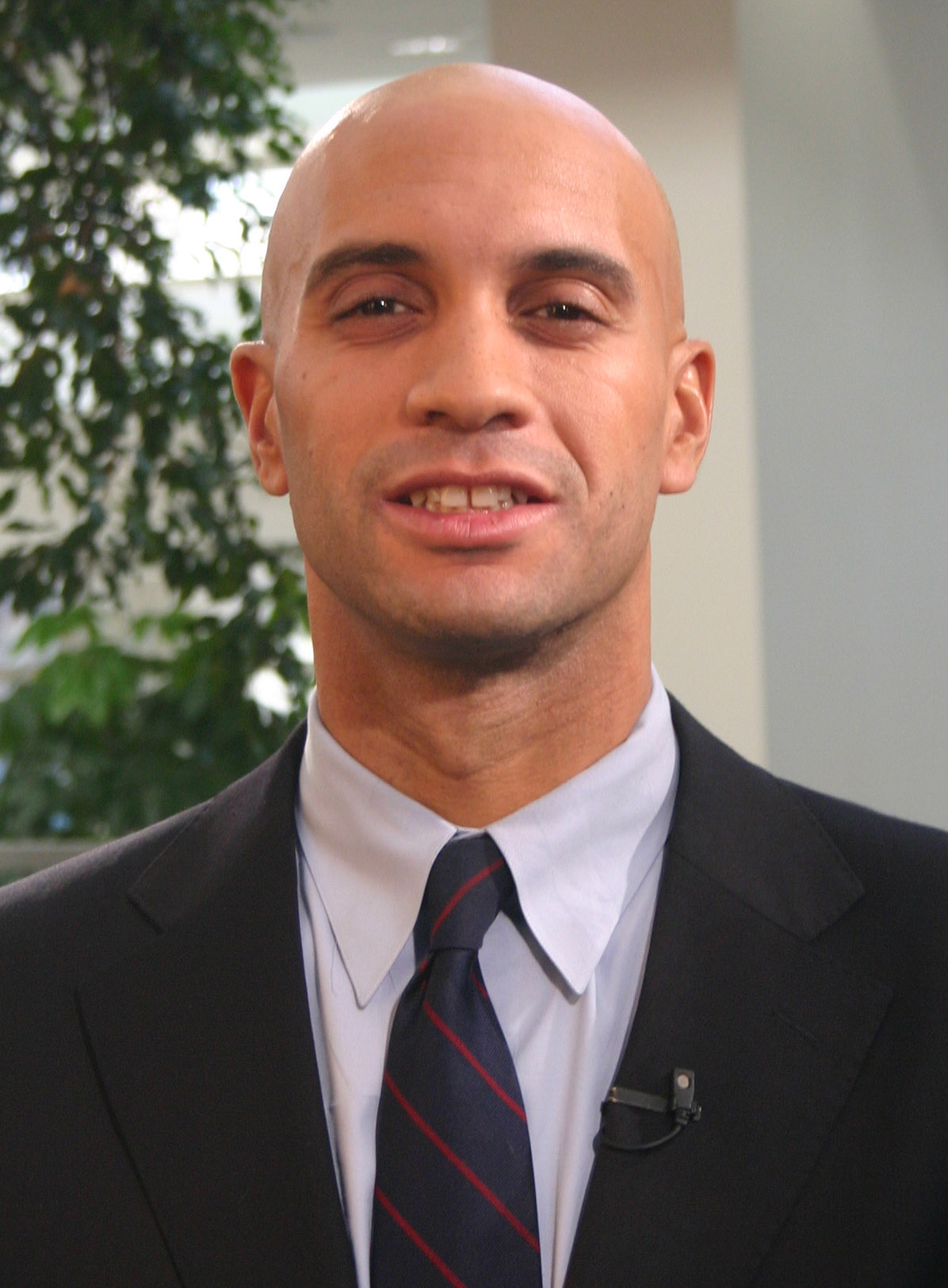

| Nominee | Adrian Fenty | Renee Bowser |
| Party | Democratic | DC Statehood Green |
| Popular vote | 23,149 | 2,742 |
| Percentage | 89.06% | 10.55% |
Councilmember before election
Charlene Drew Jarvis
Democratic
Elected Councilmember
Adrian Fenty
Democratic

Incumbent Democratic councilmember Charlene Drew Jarvis lost her re-election bid for a fifth term to primary challenger and future mayor Adrian Fenty.

=== Democratic primary ===
Candidates

- Adrian Fenty, lawyer and former Council staffer
- Charlene Drew Jarvis, incumbent Ward 4 Councilmember

Endorsements

Adrian Fenty

Labor unions

- AFL-CIO Metropolitan Washington Council

2000 Council of the District of Columbia Ward 4 Democratic primary
| Party | Candidate | Votes | % |
|---|---|---|---|
| Democratic | Adrian Fenty | 8,136 | 56.58% |
| Democratic | Charlene Drew Jarvis (inc.) | 6,193 | 43.07% |
| Write-in | | 51 | 0.35% |
| Total votes | | 14,380 | 100% |

=== Statehood Green primary ===
Candidates

- Renee Bowser, United Food and Commercial Workers lawyer

Endorsements

Renee Bowser

Organizations

- Metro DC Democratic Socialists of America

2000 Council of the District of Columbia Ward 4 Statehood Green primary
| Party | Candidate | Votes | % |
|---|---|---|---|
| DC Statehood Green | Renee Bower | 42 | 76.36% |
| Write-in | | 13 | 23.64% |
| Total votes | | 55 | 100% |

=== General Election ===
2000 Council of the District of Columbia Ward 4 election
| Party | Candidate | Votes | % |
|---|---|---|---|
| Democratic | Adrian Fenty | 23,149 | 89.06% |
| DC Statehood Green | Renee Bowser | 2,742 | 10.55% |
| Write-in | | 101 | 0.39% |
| Total votes | | 25,992 | 100% |

== Ward 7 ==
2000 Council of the District of Columbia Ward 7 election
- November 7, 2000
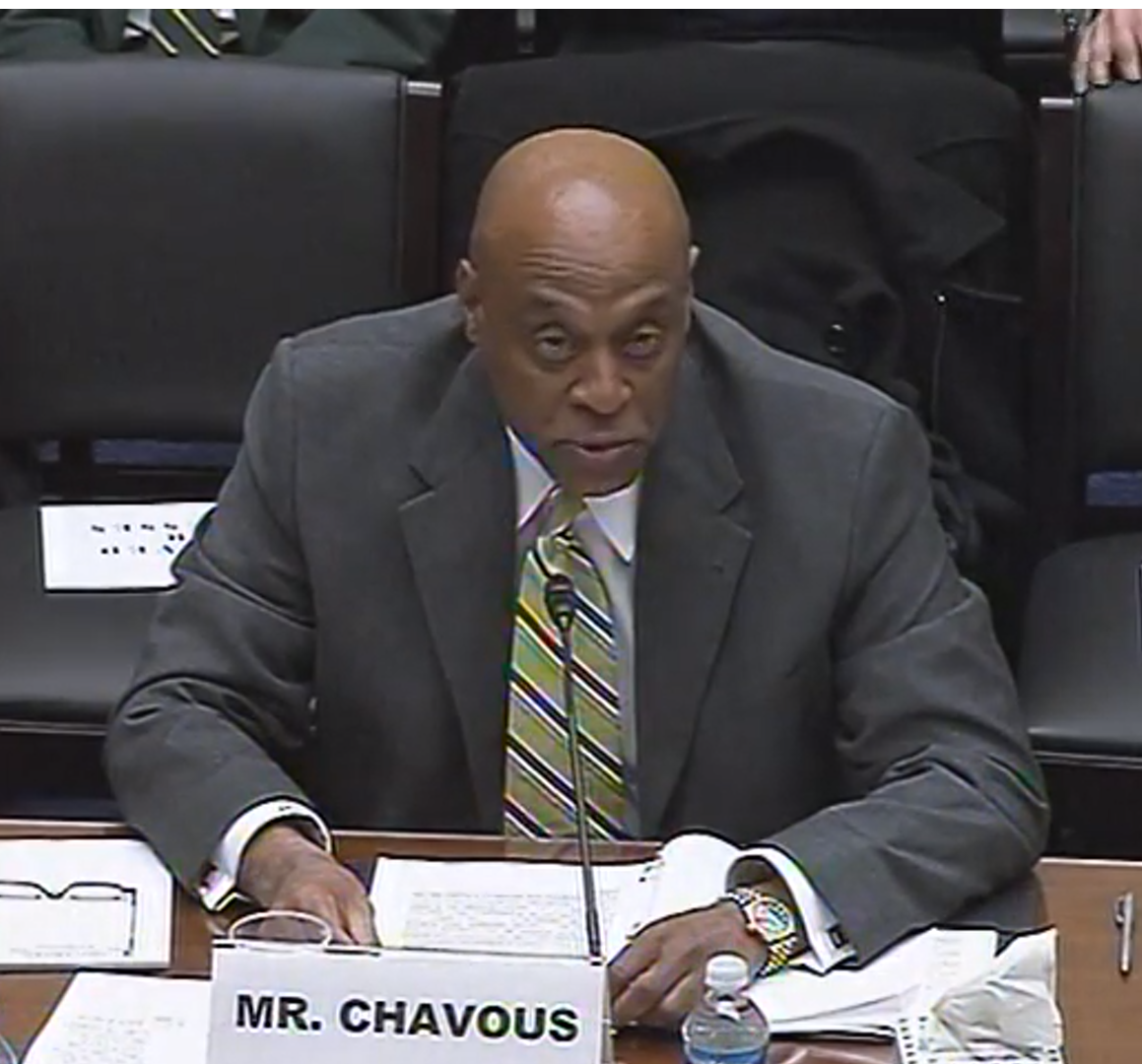

| Nominee | Kevin P. Chavous | Johnnie Scott Rice |
| Party | Democratic | Republican |
| Popular vote | 17,796 | 2,352 |
| Percentage | 87.74% | 11.60% |
Councilmember before election
Kevin P. Chavous
Democratic
Elected Councilmember
Kevin P. Chavous
Democratic

Incumbent councilmember Kevin P. Chavous won re-election to a third full term, easily beating Republican challenger Johnnie Scott Rice.

=== Democratic primary ===
Candidates

- Kevin P. Chavous, incumbent Ward 7 Councilmember
- Gary R. Feenster, computing analyst
- Durand A. Ford, financial management consultant
- Robert B. Hunter, rector of Atonement Episcopal Church
- Mary D. Jackson, United States Senate archivist

Endorsements

Kevin P. Chavous

Labor unions

- American Federation of State, County and Municipal Employees local 20

2000 Council of the District of Columbia Ward 7 Democratic primary
| Party | Candidate | Votes | % |
|---|---|---|---|
| Democratic | Kevin P. Chavous (inc.) | 2,996 | 53.40% |
| Democratic | Robert B. Hunter | 1,845 | 32.89% |
| Democratic | Mary D. Jackson | 545 | 9.71% |
| Democratic | Durand A. Ford | 128 | 2.28% |
| Democratic | Gary R. Feenster | 58 | 1.03% |
| Write-in | | 38 | 0.68% |
| Total votes | | 5,610 | 100% |

=== Republican primary ===
No candidates filed for the primary, with Johnnie Scott Rice winning the nomination through write-in votes.

2000 Council of the District of Columbia Ward 7 Republican primary
| Party | Candidate | Votes | % |
|---|---|---|---|
| | Write-in | 39 | 100% |
| Total votes | | 39 | 100% |

=== General Election ===
2000 Council of the District of Columbia Ward 7 election
| Party | Candidate | Votes | % |
|---|---|---|---|
| Democratic | Kevin P. Chavous (inc.) | 16,730 | 89.82% |
| Republican | Johnnie Scott Rice | 2,352 | 11.60% |
| Write-in | | 135 | 0.67% |
| Total votes | | 20,283 | 100% |

== Ward 8 ==
2000 Council of the District of Columbia Ward 8 election
- November 7, 2000
| Nominee | Sandy Allen |
| Party | Democratic |
| Popular vote | 11,075 |
| Percentage | 92.15% |
Councilmember before election
Sandy Allen
Democratic
Elected Councilmember
Sandy Allen
Democratic

Incumbent Councilmember Sandy Allen won re-election to her second full term.

=== Democratic primary ===
Candidates

- Sandy Allen, incumbent Ward 8 Councilmember
- Winifred Freeman, 8D04 Advisory Neighborhood Commissioner
- Dion Jordan, community activist
- Sandra Seegars, former DC Taxicab commissioner

Endorsements

Sandy Allen

Labor unions

- American Federation of State, County and Municipal Employees local 20

2000 Council of the District of Columbia Ward 8 Democratic primary
| Party | Candidate | Votes | % |
|---|---|---|---|
| Democratic | Sandy Allen (inc.) | 2,326 | 70.59% |
| Democratic | Sandra Seegars | 643 | 19.51% |
| Democratic | Dion Jordan | 202 | 6.13% |
| Democratic | Winifred Freeman | 110 | 3.34% |
| Write-in | | 14 | 0.42% |
| Total votes | | 3,295 | 100% |

=== General Election ===
2000 Council of the District of Columbia Ward 8 election
| Party | Candidate | Votes | % |
|---|---|---|---|
| Democratic | Sandy Allen (inc.) | 11,075 | 92.15% |
| Write-in | | 943 | 7.85% |
| Total votes | | 12,018 | 100% |
