= 1995 Council of the District of Columbia special election =

- May 12, 1995

Nominee	Eydie Whittington	Sandy Allen	Lafayette A. Barnes
Party	Democratic	Democratic	Democratic
Popular vote	810	808	506
Percentage	20.37%	20.32%	12.72%
Nominee	William Lockridge	Malik Z. Shabazz	O. V. Johnson
Party	Democratic	Democratic	Democratic
Popular vote	465	319	252
Percentage	11.69%	8.02%	6.34%
Chairperson before election
Vacant
Elected Chairperson
Eydie Whittington
Democratic

The 1995 Council of the District of Columbia special election was held on May 12, 1995, to elect the position of Ward 8 Councilmember to the District of Columbia. The election was called following the resignation of incumbent councilmember Marion Barry due to his election as Mayor in 1994.

== Background ==
Incumbent councilmember Marion Barry had served on Council since 1992 as the councilmember for Ward 8 in his return to city politics after his conviction for crack cocaine possession and usage. He had served on the Council previously as an at-large councilmember from 1974 to 1978 before his first election as mayor. Although he had stated that he was "not interested in being mayor" after being returned to office in 1992, he formally announced his candidacy for mayor on May 21, 1994. Upon his victory in the election, he resigned his position as Ward 8 Councilmember, leaving a vacancy to be filled by special election the following year.

The all-in nature of special elections in the District of Columbia, which have only a general election, led to a tidal wave of prospective candidates. The relative power vacuum created in Ward 8 local politics following Barry's resignation resulted in an eventual 22 candidates appearing on the final ballot, with 19 filing as Democrats. The campaign was seen as a referendum on Barry himself, as he endorsed eventual winner Eydie Whittington, whose campaign was chaired by Barry's wife.

== Candidates ==
=== Democratic Party ===
- Sandy Allen
- Lafayette A. Barnes
- James Bunn
- Charles Dixon Jr.
- Mel Edwards
- Don Folden Sr.
- F. D. R. Fox
- Bill Harris
- O. V. Johnson
- Absalom F. Jordan Jr.
- Jephunneh Lawrence
- William Lockridge
- Richard A. Miller
- Michael A. Sanders
- Cynthia Smith
- Gloria E. Thurman
- Gordon A. White
- Eydie Whittington

Endorsements

Eydie Whittington

Local Officials

- Marion Barry, mayor and vacating Ward 8 Councilmember

=== Republican Party ===
- W. Cardell Shelton

=== Umoja Party ===
- Rahim Jenkins

=== Independents ===
- Malik Z. Shabazz

== General election ==
1995 Council of the District of Columbia special election
Party	Candidate	Votes	%
Democratic	Eydie Whittington	810	20.37%
Democratic	Sandy Allen	808	20.32%
Democratic	Lafayette A. Barnes	506	12.72%
Democratic	William Lockridge	465	11.69%
Independent	Malik Z. Shabazz	319	8.02%
Democratic	O. V. Johnson	252	6.34%
Democratic	James Bunn	175	4.40%
Umoja	Rahim Jenkins	128	3.22%
Democratic	Absalom F. Jordan Jr.	100	2.51%
Democratic	Gordon A. White	60	1.51%
Democratic	Michael A. Sanders	58	1.46%
Democratic	Charles Dixon Jr.	52	1.31%
Democratic	Bill Harris	44	1.11%
Democratic	Don Holden Sr.	43	1.08%
Democratic	Gloria E. Thurman	37	0.93%
Republican	W. Cardell Shelton	32	0.80%
Democratic	Cynthia Smith	21	0.53%
Democratic	Jephunneh Lawrence	20	0.50%
Democratic	F. D. R. Fox	12	0.30%
Democratic	Mel Edwards	10	0.25%
Democratic	Richard A. Miller	4	0.10%
Write-in		21	0.53%
Total votes		3,977	100%
