= William O'Neal Lockridge =

American political activist

William O'Neal Lockridge was an American political activist.

Lockridge was born on November 22, 1947, in Columbia, Tennessee. He was raised in Chicago, Illinois, with his brother Allen and sister Joy, and attended public schools in Chicago. Upon graduation from high school, William attended and graduated from Tennessee State University in Nashville, with a Bachelor of Arts in Education.

== Community activism and career ==
Lockridge's political climb in Washington politics began when he moved to Washington in 1980 and became a field manager for the mayoral campaign of the late Patricia Roberts Harris, the former U.S. Secretary for Housing and Urban Development (HUD) under President Jimmy Carter.

After the unsuccessful campaign of Secretary Roberts, William became active with several community organizations in Southeast's Ward 8, including: the Neighborhood Planning Council (NPC); Advisory Neighborhood Commission (ANC); Parent Teachers Association (PTA); Action to Rehabilitate Housing (ARCH); and the Alabama Avenue Renaissance Task Force. During his career, he also served as President of the Ward Eight Democrats, Inc., and was active with the D.C. Democratic State Committee.

Lockridge also worked as the assistant director for the Medico-Chirurgical Society, where he over the coordination of over 500 HIV/AIDS workshops for community organizations, D.C. Public School System, government agencies and churches. He served as a teacher coordinator in DC Public Schools. He was a member of the D.C. State Board of Education for close to twenty years, where he was a staunch advocate for all of the children of Ward 8. He built partnerships with community members and Toyota Motor Corporation to provide 33,000 books—1,000 books for each school in Southeast and over $1.5 million for the Ballou SHS Automotive Program.

The Bellevue / William O. Lockridge Library, located in Southwest D.C., was named in his honor and opened to the public on Saturday, June 23, 2012.

== Personal life ==
On July 8, 1989, he married the former Wanda Matthews and had one son, Stefan O'Neal Lockridge. William also had one daughter, Joy (Lockridge) Ross.

== Death ==
William Lockridge died from respiratory failure the George Washington University Hospital on January 12, 2011. His widow established the William O. Lockridge Community Foundation (WOLCF) in his memory and to continue his legacy of closing the education gap for the young people of Wards 7 and 8.
