= The Georgetown Voice =

News magazine at Georgetown University

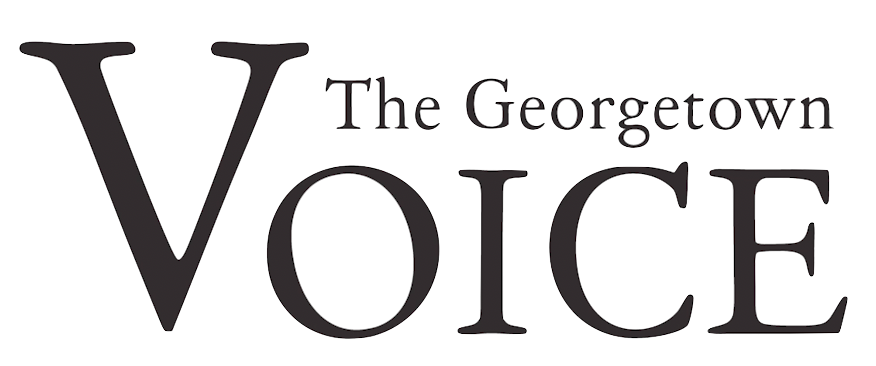
- Editor-in-chief: Sydney Carroll
- Categories: News magazine
- Frequency: Twice monthly on Fridays
- First issue: March 4, 1969
- Country: United States of America
- Based in: Washington, D.C., U.S.
- Language: English
- Website: georgetownvoice.com

The Georgetown Voice is a student-run biweekly campus news magazine at Georgetown University. Founded as a print magazine in March 1969, the Voice publishes new editions every other Friday during the academic year. The magazine publishes online daily throughout the year, featuring news on campus and in the District of Columbia, as well as commentary, reviews, long-form journalism, and sports and entertainment coverage. Online, the Voice also produces podcasts and maintains a variety sports and culture blog. It is entirely operated, written, edited, and designed by student volunteers.

== History ==
The Voice debuted on March 4, 1969. Founder Steve Pisinski created the magazine alongside breakaway editors of The Hoya, the university's legacy newspaper, after growing dissatisfied with its coverage of Vietnam War protests. In an inaugural editorial, the magazine's editors outlined the publication's mission:

"Our editorial policy will view and analyze issues in a liberal light. We shall not limit our editorial content to campus topics. We promise to present and analyze national and local issues of concern to the student, whose concern should spread beyond the campus. We shall attempt with all our energy to inform the community, to make the community conscious of controversial subjects by an open presentation and discussion of relevant issues, to communicate a culture, and to entertain our readers. "

The Hoya published an editorial on Nov. 12, 1970 proposing a merger with the Voice, citing concerns about the university's media budget and claiming the "ideological differences that lead to the founding of the Voice no longer exist." The Voice's editorial board rejected the offer the following day.

In 2006, the Voice launched a daily blog called Vox Populi, which published until 2015. It offered analysis on campus and District news, as well as recaps for sports and student government.

Sen. Bob Menendez (D-NJ) referenced the Voice on the Senate floor on April 11, 2007, while questioning Special Envoy to Sudan Andrew Natsios about the Darfur genocide.

In 2014, the Voice launched Halftime, a sports and leisure blog dedicated to non-campus content.

In celebration of the magazine's 50th anniversary, the Voice launched the Steve Pisinski Scholarship in 2019 to offer students stipends during unpaid journalism internships.

Following the 2020 George Floyd protests against police brutality and systemic racism, the Voice updated its mission statement:

"Since our founding, we have refined our mission, and, in addition to our earlier commitments, include anti-racism, trauma-informed reporting, and empathetic and considerate journalism as some of our key principles. We operate in an industry and university that can be exclusionary and harmful to marginalized communities, especially people of color, and we strive to uplift those voices in our work, rather than silence them."

Congressional candidate and former Ward 5 Councilmember Harry Thomas Jr. admitted to unintentionally plagiarizing his campaign literature from a Voice editorial on Jan. 20, 2022.

== Operations ==
The Voice maintains a non-ideological stance in its news coverage and, per its website, "is committed to providing campus with critical journalism that doesn't defer to those in power." Its editorial board is progressive and supportive of organized labor rights.

=== Structure ===
The Voice is led by an editor-in-chief, managing editors, and a team of executive editors. Each executive editor oversees a team of section editors, who manage the magazine's day-to-day content production. Section editors have teams of assistants and run open pitch meetings for Georgetown students. In addition, the Voice also has positions covering business operations, internal resources, website development, and social media.

Students may write on a volunteer basis and the Voice does not require applications for membership. All board positions are filled via popular elections as required by the organization's constitution.
