= Eydie Whittington =

American politician

Member of the Council of the District of Columbia from Ward 8
- In office May 31, 1995 – January 2, 1997
- Preceded by: Marion Barry
- Succeeded by: Sandy Allen

Personal details
- Born: September 2, 1948 (age 77)
- Party: Democratic
- Education: Coppin State University (BS)

Eydie D. Whittington (born September 2, 1948) is a Democratic politician in Washington, D.C.

== Advisory Neighborhood Commission ==
While working as a legal secretary, Whittington represented the neighborhood of Douglas Gardens on the Advisory Neighborhood Commission.

== 1995 campaign for Council ==
Whittington campaigned for Marion Barry when he was running for mayor in 1994. After Barry won the mayoral election, his seat representing Ward 8 on the Council became vacant. Whittington announced her candidacy for the seat on the Council. She was backed by Barry, and her campaign was chaired by Barry's wife, Cora Masters Barry.

Initial results from the special election had Whittington in first place by two votes.

Candidate Sandy Allen sued to have the election voided because she said individuals who were not residents of Ward 8 had voted in the special election. After a recount, Whittington's lead was revised to one vote.

Allen filed another lawsuit to prevent Whittington from taking office, saying that multiple votes for Whittington were cast by individuals who did not live in Ward 8. The court allowed Whittington to be sworn into office, and she took the oath on May 31, 1995. The court later rejected the residence challenge by Allen, saying that Allen had failed to prove that any of the people she named were not actually residents of Ward 8 at the time of the election.

Allen filed another lawsuit to overturn the election's results because of alleged voting irregularities. The court allowed the election to stand.

== 1996 campaign for Council ==
Whittington ran for reelection in 1996, and her candidacy was endorsed by Mayor Barry. Allen defeated Whittington in the Democratic party primary election, receiving 1,746 votes to Whittington's 1,425.
