= Kevin P. Chavous =

American lawyer (born 1956)

Kevin Chavous
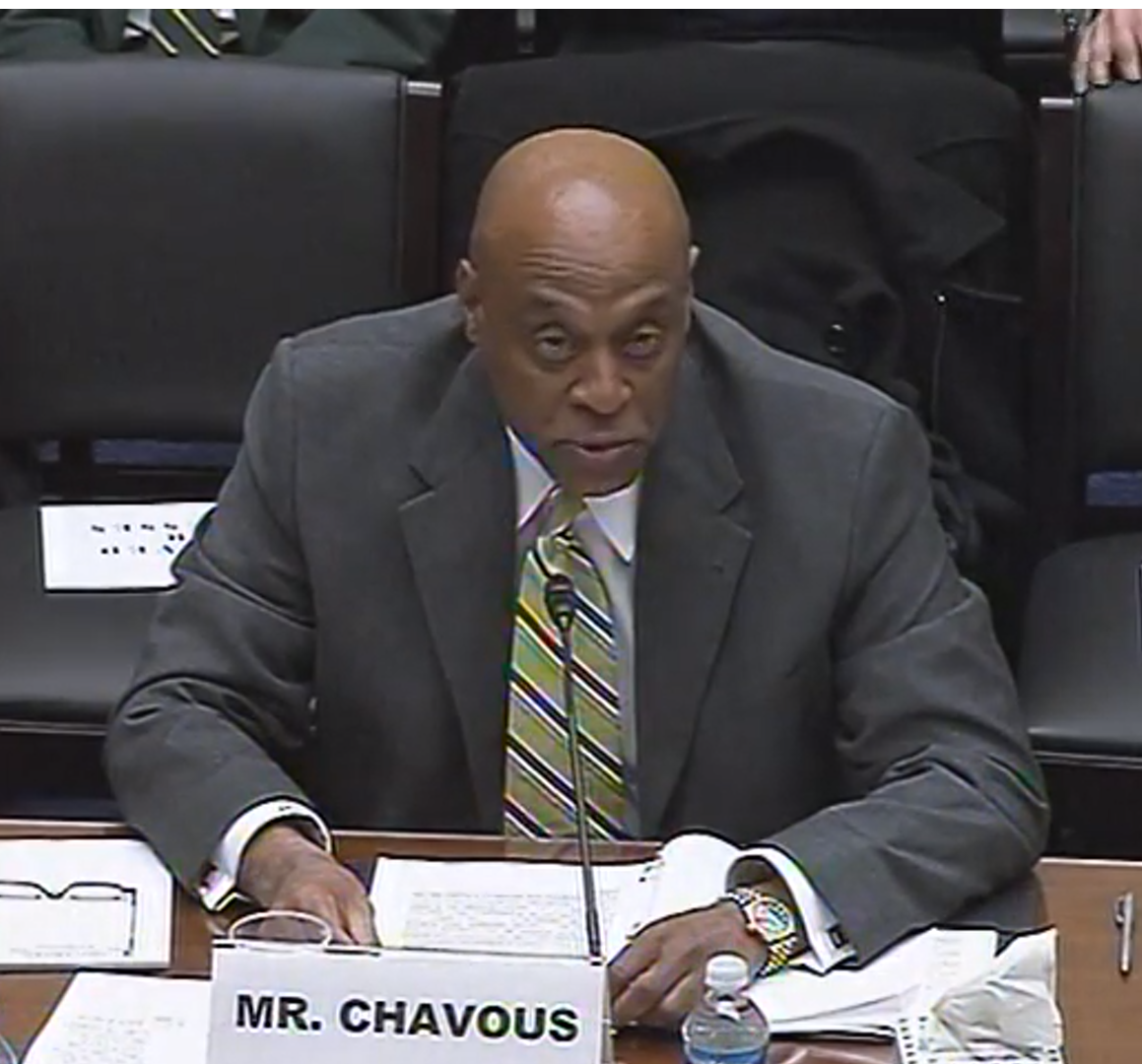

Member of the Council of the District of Columbia from Ward 7
- In office January 2, 1993 – January 2, 2005
- Preceded by: H. R. Crawford
- Succeeded by: Vince Gray

Personal details
- Born: Kevin Pernell Chavous; May 17, 1956 (age 70) Indianapolis, Indiana, U.S.
- Party: Democratic
- Education: Wabash College (BA); Howard University (JD)

Kevin Pernell Chavous (born May 17, 1956) is an American lawyer, author, education reform activist, and former Democratic Party politician in Washington, D.C., in the United States. He served as a member of the Council of the District of Columbia from January 1993 to January 2005, and was an unsuccessful candidate for Mayor of the District of Columbia in 1998.

In 2017, Chavous was named President of Stride K12, Inc., a technology-based education company and the nation's leading provider of proprietary curriculum and online school programs for students in pre-K through high school.

Chavous oversees all of the services that the company provides to approximately 200,000 students nationwide.

== Early life and education ==
Chavous was born in Indianapolis, Indiana, the son of Bettie J. and Harold P. Chavous. His father was a pharmacist and his mother a civil rights activist. Chavous was the oldest of four children. His first job was working at Chavous Drugs, his father's drug store, sweeping and mopping floors and stocking shelves.

Chavous was educated at Brebeuf Jesuit Preparatory School in Indianapolis and Wabash College in Crawfordsville, Indiana, where he earned a bachelor's degree in political science. While at Wabash, he was NCAA Division III District All-American in basketball. Chavous also earned a JD degree from the Howard University School of Law in Washington, D.C., where he was president of his law school class. He is a member of Kappa Alpha Psi fraternity.

== Community activism ==
After graduating from law school, Chavous became a personal injury lawyer for the D.C. law firm of Cadeaux & Tagliere. The Chavouses and their children lived in Hillcrest, an affluent neighborhood in Southeast Washington on the District-Maryland border.

In May 1988, Chavous was elected to the District of Columbia Democratic State Committee, representing Ward 7. The following year, Pepco, an electric power public utility, proposed a significant expansion of its coal-fired power generating plant on the edge of the River Terrace neighborhood in Ward 7. The River Terrace Community Organization, a group representing citizens living in the neighborhood, opposed the plant, and Chavous agreed to represent the group in court pro bono. Pepco cancelled the expansion in 1991, and Chavous gained significant visibility for his work.

Chavous also joined the national board of directors of Handgun Control, Inc., a group working for strong federal gun control legislation.

== 1992 council race and term ==
=== 1992 council race ===
The Pepco fight launched Chavous' political career. Chavous, who by now was hosting a once-a-week program on legal issues on radio station WDCU-FM, announced in May 1992 that he would challenge incumbent Ward 7 Councilmember H. R. Crawford. Crawford, The Washington Post reported, was facing strong criticism from voters from his legislative achievements and three Democratic primary election challengers. Chavous waged an intensive grassroots campaign to unseat Crawford. According to The Washington Post, Chavous visited every single-family residence in Ward 7 personally, either speaking with members of the household or leaving behind campaign literature. On September 15, 1992, Chavous unseated Crawford, 4,866 votes (41.7 percent) to 4,266 (37 percent). In the general election on November 3, 1992, Chavous easily defeated Republican candidate Johnnie Scott Rice, 96 percent to 4 percent.

=== First council term ===
Chavous was sworn in on January 2, 1993.

During his first term on the council, Chavous aligned with Ward 2 council member Jack Evans (elected in 1991), At-Large council member William Lightfoot (elected in 1988), and Ward 6 council member Harold Brazil (elected in 1991) to form a caucus known as the "Young Turks". Together, they successfully opposed tax increases sought for the city by Mayor Sharon Pratt Kelly. On June 22, 1993, an unidentified gunman sprayed the public swimming pool at the Benning Park Recreation Center with fire from a semiautomatic weapon. Panic-stricken children and adults fled the pool, and six children were wounded by gunfire. The incident highlighted the high level of gun violence in Ward 7, and The Washington Post said Chavous was thrust into the citywide spotlight by it. Chavous personally brought his two young children to the pool (which had seen almost no visitors since the attack) on June 29 to demonstrate the pool's safety and send a message of defiance to drug dealers and violent criminals. On September 26, 1993, four-year-old Launice Smith was shot in the head and hand (and survived) while her family watched a pick-up football game at Weatherless Elementary School in the Fort Dupont neighborhood in Ward 7. Smith was injured when four gunmen emerged from a nearby woods and then hunted down and executed 20-year-old Kervin Brown in what D.C. police said was part of an ongoing battle between rival drug gangs. Once more, Chavous was seen as one of the most important political leaders responding to violence in the city. On September 29, he announced for the formation of a 20-member task force on public safety and began pushing for Ward 7 residents to police their own neighborhoods and report drug dealing, crime, and violence. Chavous later called the task force one of the most important developments of his first term.

Among other key legislative accomplishments in his first term was a 1993 act allowing the city to seize abandoned vehicles and 1994 legislation that enacted a temporary ban on new liquor licenses for stores selling beer by the can (so-called "takeout beer"). He and the other Young Turks also successfully enacted in 1995 a $70 million cut in the wages earned by trade union members under the city's version of the Davis–Bacon Act. (The cut was temporary, and expired in 1996.)

Chavous' legislative activism declined significantly over his first term. Chavous told The Washington Post in February 1996 that "it has proved easier to wait for someone else, be it the mayor or the control board, to propose hard solutions," according to journalists Howard Schneider and David A. Vise. He unsuccessfully supported in 1995 a package of conservative Republican Party proposals to significantly change the way the city provided welfare benefits, and a plan to create an independent school board to approve and oversee charter schools. One significant (and eventually successful) change he advocated was the creation of a District of Columbia Financial Control Board to save the city from bankruptcy. He was one of the first council members to call for federal oversight (in early 1995), although later in the year he refused to vote to cut big-ticket items such as unemployment benefits or the city's summer youth jobs program. Congress created a financial control board in April 1995.

== 1996 reelection and second council term ==
=== 1996 council race ===
Chavous sought reelection in 1996. He faced a challenger in the Democratic primary election, District of Columbia Board of Education member Terry Hairston. In July 1996, Hairston challenged Chavous' right to be on the ballot. D.C. election law required a candidate to obtain signatures from at least 250 voters in a ward in order to run for a district council seat in that ward. Chavous submitted signatures from 574 voters. But D.C. law also required that all individuals gathering such signatures be residents of the District of Columbia, and Hairston alleged that Chavous campaign worker Calvin S. Hawkins did not meet that condition. The District of Columbia Board of Elections ruled in Chavous' favor on July 30, 1996. In the Democratic primary held on September 10, 1996, Chavous easily defeated Hairston and another challenger, Eddie Rhodes, winning 68 percent of the vote. Chavous won 90 percent of the vote in the general election on November 5, easily beating D.C. Statehood Party candidate Durand A. Ford (6 percent) and Republican Party candidate James Bernard Miles (3 percent).

=== Second council term ===
On December 30, 1996, Chavous was elected chairman of the council's Committee on Education, Libraries and Recreation. Ward 3 council member Kathy Patterson, a veteran education activist, also fought for the chairmanship. Patterson strongly criticized Chavous' commitment to educational reform, but Council Chairman David A. Clarke awarded the post to Chavous after he publicly declared education reform to be the biggest issue facing the city. Patterson, however, won an agreement that stripped jurisdiction over labor issues from Chavous' committee and gave it to the Committee on Government Operations (chaired by Patterson). During his first year in office, the District of Columbia Public Schools undertook an emergency $50 million project to repair leaking and structurally unsound roofs at several public schools. The project was significantly mismanaged, and forced a delay in the opening of the school year. Chavous ordered a hearing on the issue in September 1997, but a significant number of parents of schoolchildren complained he had not provided enough oversight and acted too late. In March 1997, Chavous sponsored another significant piece of legislation, a resolution disapproving a construction contract for the highly controversial Barney Circle Freeway.

Chavous also opposed construction of a new convention center in the city. As late as May 27, 1998, Chavous said he had not decided whether to support the project. But he voted to oppose it during the council's vote on June 2, arguing that plans to build a convention center smaller than many then under construction was "a plan to build a second-tier convention center".

After his losing mayoral campaign, Chavous became what The Washington Post called a "frequent critic" of the new mayor, Anthony A. Williams, and had "the chilliest relationship with the mayor" of any Council member. Chavous was an early supporter of Councilmember Carol Schwartz's tax cut package in March 1999, which became law in May. Chavous also led a nine-month effort to reconstitute and reform the D.C. Board of Education. After a long battle with Mayor Williams and other Council members, the Council approved a plan to reduce the size of the board, and make four of the nine members subject to mayoral appointment (with Council confirmation). Voters were asked to approve the "hybrid" board, which they did so in a close vote in June 2000. According to The Washington Post, the bruising school board battle helped and hindered Chavous politically. While his allies said it showed he could tackle tough problems, dissenters argued that Chavous avoided the real issues (lack of money for schools and crumbling infrastructure). Chavous blamed the lengthy legislative process on unnamed individuals who he said did not engage in good faith in the process, but critics argued that Chavous never engaged in the kind of political hardball that was needed to move the reform bill along faster. Larry Gray, legislative chairman of the D.C. Congress of PTAs, blamed Chavous for deep cuts in the school budget during the past four years, failures in the teacher certification program, and significant delays in getting technology into the classroom.

=== Private-sector work ===
In late 1998, after his campaign for mayor, Chavous left Cadeaux & Tagliere and joined the law firm of Arent, Fox, Kintner, Plotkin & Kahn.

Chavous left Arent Fox and was appointed Vice President of Communications for Covad Communications Group, a broadband provider, in December 1999. But he left that position after just a year. Citing his somewhat difficult reelection campaign, Chavous said he wanted to devote more time to his Council position.

Several years later, in March 2001, Chavous rejoined Arent Fox as counsel, a part-time position in which he specialized in business law, government relations, and general litigation. Chavous also won an appointment as an adjunct faculty member at the Washington College of Law at American University. He taught education law during the spring 2001 term. In 2002, Chavous took a job as a partner at the law firm of Sonnenschein Nath & Rosenthal, practicing education and government law.

== 1998 mayoral campaign ==
As early as January 1997, The Washington Post said, Chavous was running an all-but-announced campaign for mayor to unseat incumbent Marion Barry. As part of a staff shakeup to improve his election chances, Chavous fired Jim Ford, the veteran staff director of the Committee on Education, Libraries and Recreation. Valerie Strauss of The Washington Post said Ford's dismissal "robbed the committee of its institutional memory and one of its most vocal advocates for school reform." But although Chavous had worked diligently to improve his name recognition and standing with the public, he garnered just 7 percent of those likely voters polled by The Washington Post in May 1997.

Chavous formally announced his campaign for mayor on February 10, 1998, and raised $117,000 in the first month of his campaign. Chavous trailed the other leading candidate in the race, Jack Evans, who raised more than $307,000 since early December 1997, as well as restaurateur Jeffrey Gildenhorn, who donated $400,000 of his own money to his own campaign. More than a third of the campaign contributions to the Chavous campaign came from individuals living outside the District of Columbia. Chavous said in April 1998 that, if elected, he would focus heavily on education reform. He rejected school vouchers, but promised to fire principals and teachers who did not meet performance standards and create a boarding school for troubled youth. He also said he would disband the police oversight group established by the Financial Control Board, and work to revive commercial areas throughout the city. He later said he would cut a number of taxes levied by the city, including the corporate income tax, and seek passage of a federal law that would replace the current progressive federal income tax on city residents with a flat federal income tax of 15 percent. He also proposed universal early childhood education, and significantly improved city services for Latino residents. By mid-May, a Post poll showed 29 percent of voters favoring a sixth Barry term. Harold Brazil had 16 percent, Kevin Chavous had 15 percent, and Jack Evans had 10 percent. On May 21, Barry said he would not seek reelection. The announcement was a boost for Chavous, as polling showed that Barry's supporters were most likely to support him over other mayoral candidates.

However, on May 30, 1998, Anthony A. Williams entered the race for mayor. Williams was the city's Chief Financial Officer, a position created by the same federal legislation which created the Financial Control Board. Williams had helped steer the city toward financial solvency, and had proven immensely popular among residents. By early June, the Chavous campaign had raised more than $260,000 in campaign donations in an attempt to reach its $750,000 goal; about 25 percent of the contributions came from non-District residents. On June 20, Chavous barely won a straw poll of Democrats in Ward 8. Anthony Williams came in a close second, in what The Washington Post called a sign of weakening support for Chavous. But nine days later, he won the endorsement of the Metropolitan Washington AFL–CIO, a broad coalition of trade unions.

On July 1, Vickey Wilcher, the manager of Chavous' mayoral campaign, quit amid rumors of infighting among Chavous' top aides. The Washington Post reported that several top campaign staff were angered by Chavous' "indecisiveness" over the convention center issue. They were also alarmed that Chavous had failed to win the Ward 8 endorsement, and they fought with other campaign managers over the direction of the Chavous effort. The campaign received another blow a few days later when the influential Washington Teachers Union broke with the AFL-CIO and endorsed Williams for mayor. In July, Chavous raised another $100,000 toward his campaign goal. But Anthony Williams raised more than $400,000—most of it in small donations from voters throughout the city. Chavous also loaned his campaign $25,000.

As the primary season wound down, a Post poll released on September 3, 1998, showed Williams with 37 percent of the vote and Chavous with 20 percent. A few days later, the Washington Teachers Union, D.C. Construction and Building Trades Council, Washington Social Workers Association, D.C. Nurses' Association, and National Hispanic Law Enforcement Association accused Chavous of missing 37 percent of all Council sessions during his first term in office, an accusation Chavous strongly denied. In the last month of the mayoral race, Williams raised $303,000 compared with just over $77,000 for Chavous. Chavous concluded the race having raised just $450,000 toward his goal of $750,000, and he had only $66,000 for the final week of the campaign compared to Williams' $97,500.

Anthony Williams won the Democratic primary election held on September 15, 1998. Williams received 50 percent of the vote, with Chavous a distant second at 35 percent. (Note: Williams defeated Chavous in Ward 4 by just 300 votes, his narrowest margin in any of the city's eight wards.) Williams easily defeated Republican Carol Schwartz in the general election on November 4, 66 percent to 30 percent. He carried all eight wards by a solid margin.

== 2000 reelection and third term ==
=== 2000 council race ===
Chavous announced he would run for a third four-year term on the Council of the District of Columbia in June 2000.

His primary campaign faced significant problems. In June, the Far Northeast/Southeast Council, a coalition of Advisory Neighborhood Commissions (ANC) and neighborhood civic associations, voted "no-confidence" in Chavous, saying he had been absent from too many community meetings and events and had failed to keep resident informed about major changes in their ward (such as the relocation of the D.C. Department of Employment Services and the opening of a new charter school). In late July, the Metropolitan Washington Council of the AFL-CIO declined to make an endorsement in the Ward 7 Council primary race, after the Washington Federation of Teachers accused Chavous of ignoring their input on education policy. (The teachers union also declined an endorsement in August.) By August 4, Chavous had only raised $2,100 in contributions, but spent more than $46,500. (He used funds left over from his 1998 mayoral race to reduce that deficit to just $7,100.) Four individuals also challenged Chavous in the Democratic primary: Rev. Robert B. Hunter of Atonement Episcopal Church; Mary D. Jackson, a United States Senate archivist and an ANC member; Durand A. Ford, a financial management consultant; and Gary R. Feenster, a computing analyst. By the end of August, Chavous had raised $6,000 in new contributions, and said he hoped to raise $20,000 more before the general election.

Despite these problems, Chavous won the Democratic primary on September 12. He garnered 53 percent of the vote. (Note: A later press report pegged his margin at just 51 percent.) His closest challenger was Rev. Robert B. Hunter, who received 33 percent of the vote.

Chavous' campaign problems eased during the general election. By October 10, he had raised $66,800, and had $14,000 in cash on hand for the remaining three weeks of the general election campaign. Chavous blamed his reduced electoral margin in the primary on "lingering anger" over the school board reform battle. Chavous won the general election on November 7 with 87 percent of the vote. Write-in Republican candidate Johnnie Scott Rice won 12 percent.

=== Third council term ===
Chavous continued to have a contentious relationship with Mayor Williams in his third term. The Washington Post claimed that Chavous was considering a mayoral run in 2002, and that his battles with Williams were motivated by the search for a campaign issue. His relationship with Harold Brazil also broke down over Brazil's support for Williams. "Harold's just become a lapdog," Chavous said. "Harold just defends the mayor even when the mayor doesn't ask for support. Frankly, it's more than frustrating."

Chavous was vocal on a number of issues in his third council term. He opposed repeal of council members' term limits (approved by voters in 1994), and supported a redistricting plan which expanded Ward 7 west of the Anacostia River (angering residents of Kingman Park, who wished to remain part of Ward 6). But Peggy Cooper Cafritz, the highly influential president of the new school board, strongly criticized Chavous for failing to secure more funding for public schools, and residents of Ward 7 were so upset with his failure to push for cleanup of abandoned lots that 20 of them dumped trash on Chavous' front lawn in January 2003.

Chavous publicly stated he was considering another mayoral run in December 2001. When Mayor Williams apologized publicly for ethical lapses in January 2002, local news media reported that this only boosted Chavous' interest in a campaign. Lingering anger among residents on the east side of the city at the closing of D.C. General Hospital and those who lived in areas unaffected by the city's business resurgence led Chavous to publicly announce he was considering a run. In April 2002, as the filing deadline neared, Chavous admitted he had a growing interest in challenging Williams for the mayor's office Chavous announced in May that he would make a decision by the end of the month, noting that his own poll showed he was "very well known and very well respected" and that the public held a much less negative view about him than Williams. A damper was put on expectations for a Chavous run in late May when a Post poll showed Chavous losing to Williams, 51 percent to 31 percent. On June 6, Chavous announced he would not run for mayor. When a local court ruled that Williams had not submitted enough valid signatures to put himself on the ballot, Williams announced he would run as a write-in candidate in the Democratic Party primary. There was brief speculation by a number of political observers, The Washington Post said, that Chavous would enter the race. But he did not.

The biggest issue of Chavous' third term was school vouchers. Chavous had opposed vouchers in the past, but by February 2003, The Washington Post reported, Chavous was much more interested in providing ways to given parents a choice in whether to send their child to public school, private school, or charter school. Chavous and Mayor Williams met with Secretary of Education Rod Paige on February 6, 2003, to discuss vouchers and other "choice" programs, during which time Paige pledged a voucher program would not be forced on the city. After the meeting, Chavous said he had not yet decided if he would support vouchers or not. Chavous then began to significantly moderate his criticism of Williams. By March 31, Chavous said that he had come to support vouchers, but only if the program were not forced on the city and only if federal (not city) funds were used to finance the program. On February 8, 2003, President George W. Bush announced that he would seek federal legislation to impose a school voucher program on the city. As Bush's proposal was considered by the House of Representatives, Chavous and D.C.'s Delegate to Congress, Eleanor Holmes Norton (a strong opponent of vouchers), blamed one another for a series of snubs, missed meetings, and attacks. By the time the measure moved to the Senate in September, Chavous (along with Mayor Williams and Board President Cafritz) was opposed on the voucher issue by a significant majority of elected officials in the city. The Senate passed the school voucher bill on January 23, 2004, and President Bush signed it into law. The legislation provided for a temporary, five-year experiment under which 1,700 low-income students would receive up to $7,500 a year so that they could attend a private school in the city or nearby jurisdictions. Congress provided $14 million for the project.

A second major educational issue which arose during Chavous' third term was another round of reform aimed at the D.C. Board of Education. On September 24, 2003, Mayor Williams announced that the city's public school system was so dysfunctional and provided such low-quality education that he was introducing legislation to strip the Board of nearly all its power. Control over the school system would be given to the mayor, who would have the right to hire and fire the superintendent, principals, teachers, and other workers and who would gain significant new powers to reconstitute programs, operations, curriculum, and schools. Although Chavous was working on his own bill to give the council and mayor more power over the school system, (Note: Chavous' plan was still under development, but would give the District Council a line item veto over the public school budget.) he immediately threw his support behind Williams' plan. But little action on the mayor's plan had been taken by January 2004. Chavous argued that Williams had not been forceful enough in making the case for his proposal, and journalist Craig Timberg linked Chavous' lack of activity on the measure to a reluctance to take on a controversial issue in an election year. (Chavous' own bill was also delayed, and he said it would not be ready until at least March 2004.) Williams said he might seek a third term as mayor merely to fight for his school reform bill, if the council did not act more expeditiously. In February 2004, Chavous announced he no longer supported the mayor's bill. The school district was without a superintendent, and Chavous argued that no individual would want the job if the council was considering such a significant change to the position. He also said that giving the mayor hiring and firing authority over the superintendent would require congressional approval or a voter referendum, and both processes would take too long. Chavous then introduced a bill which largely undid the 2000 reforms. The new bill provided for a nine-member board, with eight elected members (one from each ward) and a president elected citywide. Chavous' committee approved the bill in April 2004 without a hearing. Although Mayor Williams submitted an altered form of his original proposal two weeks after the defeat, it was rejected in mid-May and the Chavous bill approved by the council in July on a close 7-to-6 vote.

The last major issue of Chavous' third term on the council was funding for Nationals Park. Major League Baseball was willing to move the Montreal Expos to Washington, D.C., which had long sought a major-league baseball franchise, but only if the city built a modern, baseball-only stadium for the team. By early June 2003, most of the District Council opposed the initial financing plan submitted by Williams. Chavous was the lone undecided councilmember. (Harold Brazil was the only supporter.) Chavous supported the stadium plan only after he had lost the September 14 Democratic primary. But he remained largely quiet during council debates, and was still considered a swing vote by November. On November 3, he provided the critical third vote on the council's Economic Development Committee, which approved the stadium deal. Twenty-seven days later, he joined with a narrow majority on the council to win final approval for the project. Chavous twice more voted to approve the stadium financing arrangement in December, when the financing mechanism was amended.

His term in office ended on January 2, 2005, when Gray was sworn in.

== 2004 failed reelection bid ==
Rumors that Chavous would face significant primary opposition should he run for reelection in 2004 emerged in March 2003. Vincent C. Gray, former director of the D.C. Department of Human Services and the founding director of the D.C. chapter of Covenant House, challenged incumbent Jeri Washington for the chairmanship of the Ward 7 Democrats. Gray easily won, 256 to 134. The Washington Post concluded that the loss reflected discontent with Chavous' tenure in office, and that there was widespread speculation that Gray would challenge Chavous for the Ward 7 council seat the following year. Several of the activists and donors who had backed Anthony Williams in his first race for mayor urged Gray to run against Chavous. Gray launched his campaign to unseat Chavous on May 19, 2004, and began waging what the Post called an "aggressive campaign". Gray was not Chavous' only challenger. Five other individuals had also filed for the seat (although none of them were expected to impact the race significantly).

By the end of June, Gray had raised $1,235 in contributions. By the end of July, Chavous had raised $88,514 (all but $16,259 in May 2004) and had $42,295 on hand. Gray's campaign theme was that Chavous was out of touch with the ward, rarely attending neighborhood events and traveling out of town too frequently. Sam Bost, president of the influential Far Northeast/Southeast Council, announced in mid August that he would no longer support Chavous, and Gray won endorsements from several key organizations and individuals. Chavous argued that working on legislation consumed most of his time, and pointed to the school voucher program and the extensive charter school network in the city as major accomplishments. By August 22, Gray had raised $38,531 for a total of $52,389, while Chavous had raised $110,199 (and had $42,296 on hand).

The Chavous campaign received a blow on August 31 when the D.C. Democratic State Committee voted 35-to-3 to endorse Gray in the Ward 7 Democratic primary race. The vote, which The Washington Post called "an embarrassment" for Chavous, was the first time committee had endorsed a candidate in a primary election. Chavous dismissed the outcome, calling the vote "a sham". As the primary approached on September 14, the Post called the election the closest since Chavous defeated Crawford in 1992. Voter sentiment seemed to focus on the 2003–2004 Board of Education reform debate, with voters blaming Chavous for the long debate—which, many said, discouraged the two leading candidates for superintendent to drop out. Gray also hammered Chavous on his support for the federal voucher program, which he claimed took money away from public schools. Chavous argued that he had helped improve the delivery and amount of city services, was critical in winning construction of two new public schools in Ward 7, and that he had brought economic development to the area by shepherding the redevelopment of the Skyland shopping mall. By the end of the primary, Chavous had raised $138,849 in contributions.

Chavous lost his bid for reelection after losing the September 14, 2004, Democratic primary to Gray, 50 percent to 34 percent. David Nakamura, reporter for The Washington Post, said that voters were unhappy with city schools, which had not improved despite the reforms Chavous took credit for.

The D.C. Office of Campaign Finance began an investigation into the 2004 Chavous Democratic primary campaign. The Washington Post reported that the Chavous campaign failed to file financial reports for October and November and paid three invoices totaling $9,000 when the campaign did not have funds to cover the checks. A creditor then filed a complaint with the D.C. police. The Office of Campaign Finance scheduled a hearing on the alleged campaign violations in November 2004, but Chavous did not appear. In an interview with the Post, Chavous blamed a bank error and his campaign treasurer for the problems. Chavous personally gave one creditor a $5,000 cashier's check to cover a radio ad purchase, and his campaign's field coordinator was paid using $2,000 of Chavous' personal funds and $1,000 of the campaign's funds.

== National education reform advocacy ==
In 2004, Chavous authored the book Serving Our Children: Charter Schools and the Reform of American Public Education. The following year, he was named a Distinguished Fellow with the Center for Education Reform.

Chavous served on the education policy committee of Barack Obama's 2008 election campaign. The same year, he co-founded and was named chairman of the board of directors of Democrats for Education Reform (DFER), a political action committee which supports Democratic candidates for office who support school vouchers, and with DFER founded the Education Equality Project. He also co-founded in 2008 the nonprofit organization Serving Our Children, which provides grants to teachers for the purchase of classroom supplies. He was also named that year to the board of directors of the Black Alliance for Educational Options, an educational reform group promoting school vouchers and charter schools. He became the group's chairman in 2010.

In 2010, Chavous was part of the team formed by Bobby Jindal, Governor of Louisiana, to develop a school voucher program for New Orleans. The group successfully lobbied the Louisiana State Legislature for passage of the program.

Chavous joined the board of directors of the American Federation for Children and the Alliance for School Choice about 2011, organizations co-founded by Republican politician Betsy DeVos. In 2012, he served as executive counsel for the American Federation for Children. Also in 2012, Chavous served as a lobbyist for Intralot, the contractor which provided lottery services to the D.C. Lottery.

In October 2017, Chavous was named K12 Inc.'s President of Academics, Policy and Schools. Prior to being named president, Chavous served on K12's board of directors.

== Personal life ==
In 1982, Chavous married attorney and law school classmate Beverly Bass. The couple divorced in 2009. They have two sons, Kevin (born 1984) and Eric (born 1990). Chavous currently lives in Vienna, Virginia with his wife Amber and his stepson, Kalijah Mayfield.

== Author ==
In 2012, Chavous published his second book, "Voices of Determination: Children that Defy the Odds". In the book, Chavous shares the stories of ten young people who overcame assorted challenges in order to get their education. In 2016, the book was being developed into a screenplay.

In the fall of 2016, Chavous released his third book, Building A Learning Culture in America, in which he details how America embraced and cultivated a learning culture in the past, how it lost its way and what we need to do as a nation to regain that learning culture.

In 2017, Chavous released his first fiction book, The Plan, a conspiracy-based political thriller based on The Plan which suggests that white Washingtonians have a master design to displace black residents. In 2019, he published The Fund and The Shipment, both sequels to The Plan.

== Awards ==
In 2016, Chavous has received an award from school alma mater, Brebeuf Preparatory High School in Indianapolis, as an Outstanding Alumni Award. Wabash college recognized his basketball accomplishments by inducting him into the Wabash College Athletics Hall of Fame.

== Electoral history ==
=== 1992 ===
Council of the District of Columbia, Ward 7, Democratic primary election, 1992
Party	Candidate	Votes	%
Democratic	Kevin P. Chavous	4,816	42
Democratic	H. R. Crawford	4,266	37
Democratic	Nate Bush	2,140	18
Democratic	A. (Tony) Graham Sr.	304	3
Democratic	Write-in	17	0

Council of the District of Columbia, Ward 7, general election, 1992
Party	Candidate	Votes	%
Democratic	Kevin P. Chavous	21,356	96
Republican	Johnnie Scott Rice	824	4
	Write-in	98	0

=== 1996 ===
Council of the District of Columbia, Ward 7, Democratic primary election, 1996
Party	Candidate	Votes	%
Democratic	Kevin P. Chavous	4,658	68
Democratic	Terry Hairston	1,647	24
Democratic	Eddie Rhodes	441	7
Democratic	Write-in	76	1

Council of the District of Columbia, Ward 7, general election, 1996
Party	Candidate	Votes	%
Democratic	Kevin P. Chavous	16,730	90
DC Statehood	Durand A. Ford	1,175	6
Republican	James Bernard Miles	605	3
	Write-in	117	1

=== 1998 ===
Mayor of the District of Columbia, Democratic primary election, 1998
Party	Candidate	Votes	%
Democratic	Anthony A. Williams	45,216	50
Democratic	Kevin P. Chavous	31,499	35
Democratic	Jack Evans	8,621	10
Democratic	Harold Brazil	3,994	4
Democratic	Sylvia Robinson-Green	363	0
Democratic	Jeff Gildenhorn	358	0
Democratic	Osie Thorpe	167	0
Democratic	Write-in	367	0

=== 2000 ===
Council of the District of Columbia, Ward 7, Democratic primary election, 2000
Party	Candidate	Votes	%
Democratic	Kevin P. Chavous	2,996	53
Democratic	Robert B. Hunter	1,845	33
Democratic	Mary D. Jackson	545	10
Democratic	Durand A. Ford	128	2
Democratic	Gary R. Feenster	58	1
Democratic	Write-in	38	1

Council of the District of Columbia, Ward 7, general election, 2000
Party	Candidate	Votes	%
Democratic	Kevin P. Chavous	17,796	88
Republican	Johnnie Scott Rice	2,352	12
	Write-in	135	1

=== 2004 ===
Council of the District of Columbia, Ward 7, Democratic primary election, 2004
Party	Candidate	Votes	%
Democratic	Vincent C. Gray	5,342	50
Democratic	Kevin P. Chavous	3,631	34
Democratic	Mia Hairston-Hamilton	1,086	10
Democratic	Mary D. Jackson	463	4
Democratic	Donna E. Daniels	72	1
Democratic	James (JJ-Jimmy) Johnson	67	1
Democratic	Write-in	18	0
