= Sandy Allen (D.C. Council) =

American politician

Member of the Council of the District of Columbia from Ward 8
- In office January 2, 1997 – January 2, 2005
- Preceded by: Eydie Whittington
- Succeeded by: Marion Barry

Personal details
- Born: October 18, 1943 (age 82)
- Party: Democratic

Sandra C. "Sandy" Allen (born October 18, 1943) is a Democratic politician in Washington, D.C. She was elected as the Ward 8 member of the Council of the District of Columbia in 1996 and served in that position until 2005.

== Political career ==
- November 4, 1986 - elected Advisory Neighborhood Commissioner for district 8E03
- November 8, 1988 - re-elected Advisory Neighborhood Commissioner for district 8E03
- November 6, 1990 - re-elected to a third term as Advisory Neighborhood Commissioner for district 8E03
- November 6, 1994 - returned for a fourth, non-consecutive, term as Advisory Neighborhood Commissioner for district 8E03, after one term off the commission (Bonnie J. Ross was elected in 1992)
- May 2, 1995 - ran for Ward 8 council member in special election to replace Marion Barry, who had become mayor, but was defeated by Eydie Whittington, Barry's chosen successor, by a two-vote margin
- September 10, 1996 - defeated Whittington in Democratic primary
- November 5, 1996 - elected Ward 8 council member
- November 7, 2000 - reelected Ward 8 council member
- September 14, 2004 - ran for reelection but was defeated in primary by Marion Barry
