= 1998 Council of the District of Columbia election =

U.S. election

- November 3, 1998

7 seats on the Council of the District of Columbia 7 seats needed for a majority
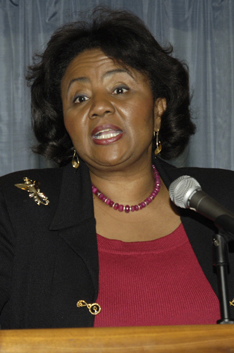

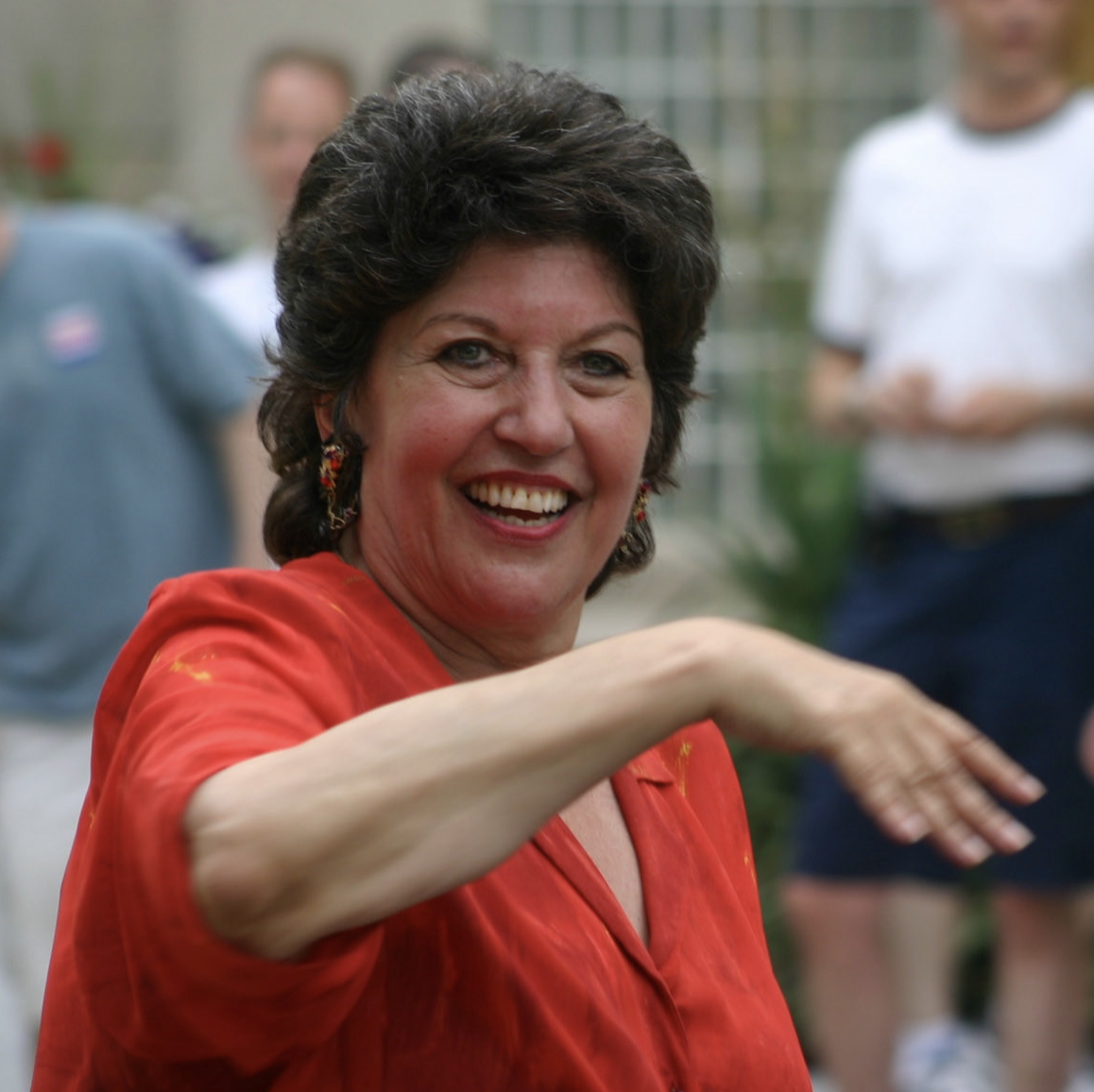

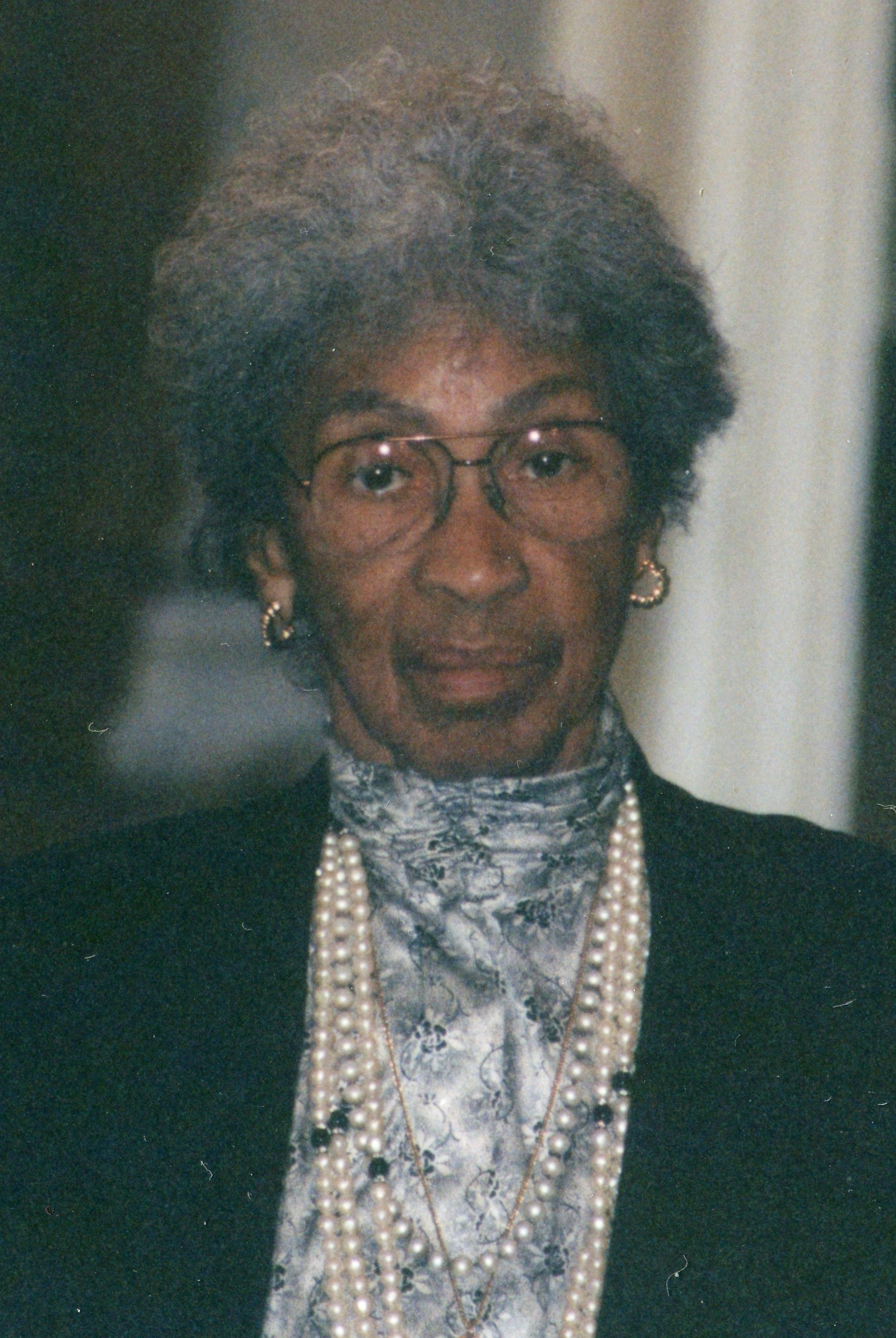
	Majority party	Minority party	Third party
Leader	Linda Cropp	Carol Schwartz	Hilda Mason
Party	Democratic	Republican	DC Statehood
Seats before	10	2	1
Seats after	11	2	0
Seat change	▲1	Steady	▼1

The 1998 Council of the District of Columbia election was held on November 3, with primaries taking place on September 15. Hilda Mason, the lone member of the D.C. Statehood Party on the council, lost re-election to her at-large seat after 21 years on the Council, marking the last time a member of the D.C. Statehood party or its successor Statehood Green party would have representation on the Council. In contrast, Republican David Catania held on to the seat he had won in the 1997 special election. The two at-large seats held by the District of Columbia Republican Party would begin an era of the high-water mark of Republicans in local District politics, achieving their maximum influence and electoral success. Frank Smith and Harry Thomas Sr., councilmembers from Wards 1 and 6 respectively, both lost their primary elections to challengers. All other incumbents were re-elected, with Democrats increasing their control over the Council to 11 of the 13 total seats.

== Summary ==
Democrats remained the largest party on the council, with no seats being lost to other parties or independents. The D.C. Statehood party lost their only elected member, Hilda Mason, while Republicans secured their two seats.

=== At-large ===
Position	Incumbent				Candidates
Position	Member	Party	First elected	Status	Candidates
Chairperson	Linda Cropp	Democratic	1997 (special)	Incumbent re-elected.	▌ ✓ Linda Cropp 91.2%; ▌ Joseph Romanow 7.6%
At-large	David Catania	Republican	1997 (special)	Incumbent re-elected.	▌ ✓ Phil Mendelson 37.3%; ▌ ✓ David Catania 20.9%; ▌ Hilda Mason 14.9%; ▌ Beverly J. Wilbourn 11.9%%; ▌ Malik Z. Shabazz 8.1%; ▌ Mark Thompson 5.1%; ▌ Sandra Seegars 1.4%
At-large	Hilda Mason	D.C. Statehood	1977 (special)	Incumbent lost re-election. New councilmember elected. Democratic gain.	▌ ✓ Phil Mendelson 37.3%; ▌ ✓ David Catania 20.9%; ▌ Hilda Mason 14.9%; ▌ Beverly J. Wilbourn 11.9%%; ▌ Malik Z. Shabazz 8.1%; ▌ Mark Thompson 5.1%; ▌ Sandra Seegars 1.4%

=== Wards ===
Position	Incumbent				Candidates
Position	Member	Party	First elected	Status	Candidates
Ward 1	Frank Smith	Democratic	1982	Incumbent lost re-election. New councilmember elected. Democratic hold.	▌ ✓ Jim Graham 72.4%; ▌ Nik Eames 12.7%; ▌ Scott McLarty 8.3%; ▌ Mark Leventhal 5.7%
Ward 3	Kathleen Patterson	Democratic	1994	Incumbent re-elected.	▌ ✓ Kathleen Patterson 98.0%
Ward 5	Harry Thomas Sr.	Democratic	1986	Incumbent lost re-election. New councilmember elected. Democratic hold.	▌ ✓ Vincent Orange 89.1%; ▌ Ian Alexander 9.9%
Ward 6	Sharon Ambrose	Democratic	1997 (special)	Incumbent re-elected.	▌ ✓ Sharon Ambrose 91.7%; ▌ Richard de Beauvoir 7.3%

== Chairperson ==
1998 Council of the District of Columbia Chairperson election
- November 3, 1998
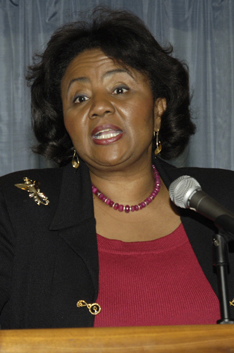

Nominee	Linda Cropp	Joseph Romanow
Party	Democratic	DC Statehood
Popular vote	117,938	9,784
Percentage	91.15%	7.56%
Chairperson before election
Linda Cropp
Democratic
Elected Chairperson
Linda Cropp
Democratic

Incumbent chairwoman Linda Cropp was first elected in the 1997 special election, and easily won re-election against challenger Joseph Romanow.

=== Democratic primary ===
Candidates

- Linda Cropp, incumbent Chairwoman

Endorsements

Linda Cropp

Labor unions

- Washington Teachers' Union

Publications

- The Washington Post

1998 Council of the District of Columbia Chairperson Democratic primary
Party	Candidate	Votes	%
Democratic	Linda Cropp (inc.)	71,333	97.92%
Write-in		1,513	2.08%
Total votes		72,846	100%

=== Statehood primary ===
Candidates

- Joseph Romanow

1998 Council of the District of Columbia Chairperson D.C. Statehood primary
Party	Candidate	Votes	%
DC Statehood	Joseph Romanow	271	79.24%
Write-in		71	20.76%
Total votes		342	100%

=== General election ===
1998 Council of the District of Columbia Chairperson election
Party	Candidate	Votes	%
Democratic	Linda Cropp (inc.)	117,938	91.15%
DC Statehood	Joseph Romanow	9,784	7.56%
Write-in		1,673	1.29%
Total votes		129,395	100%

== At-large ==
1998 Council of the District of Columbia At-large election
- November 3, 1998
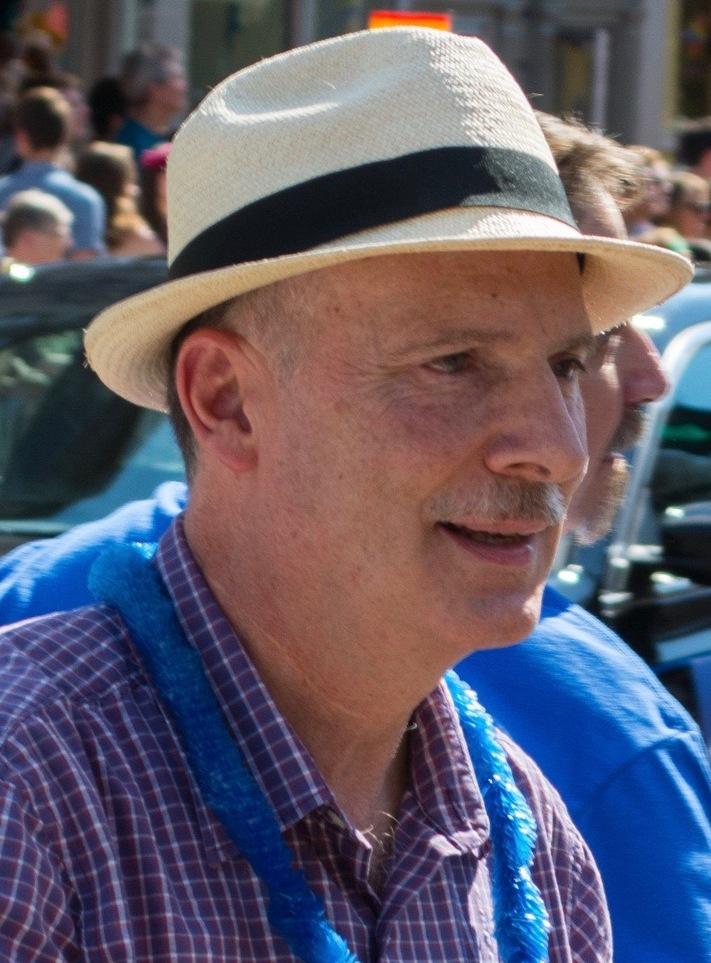

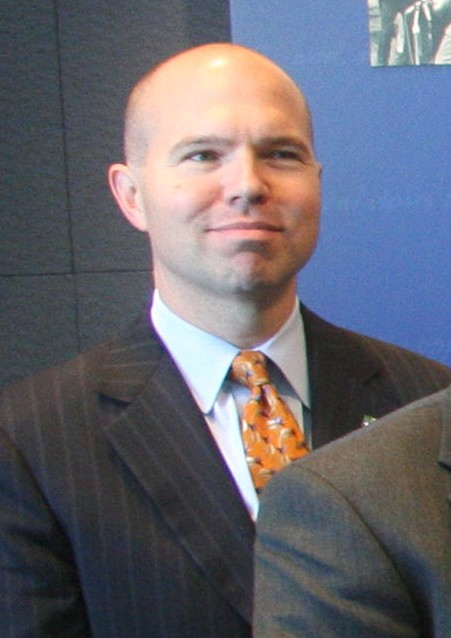

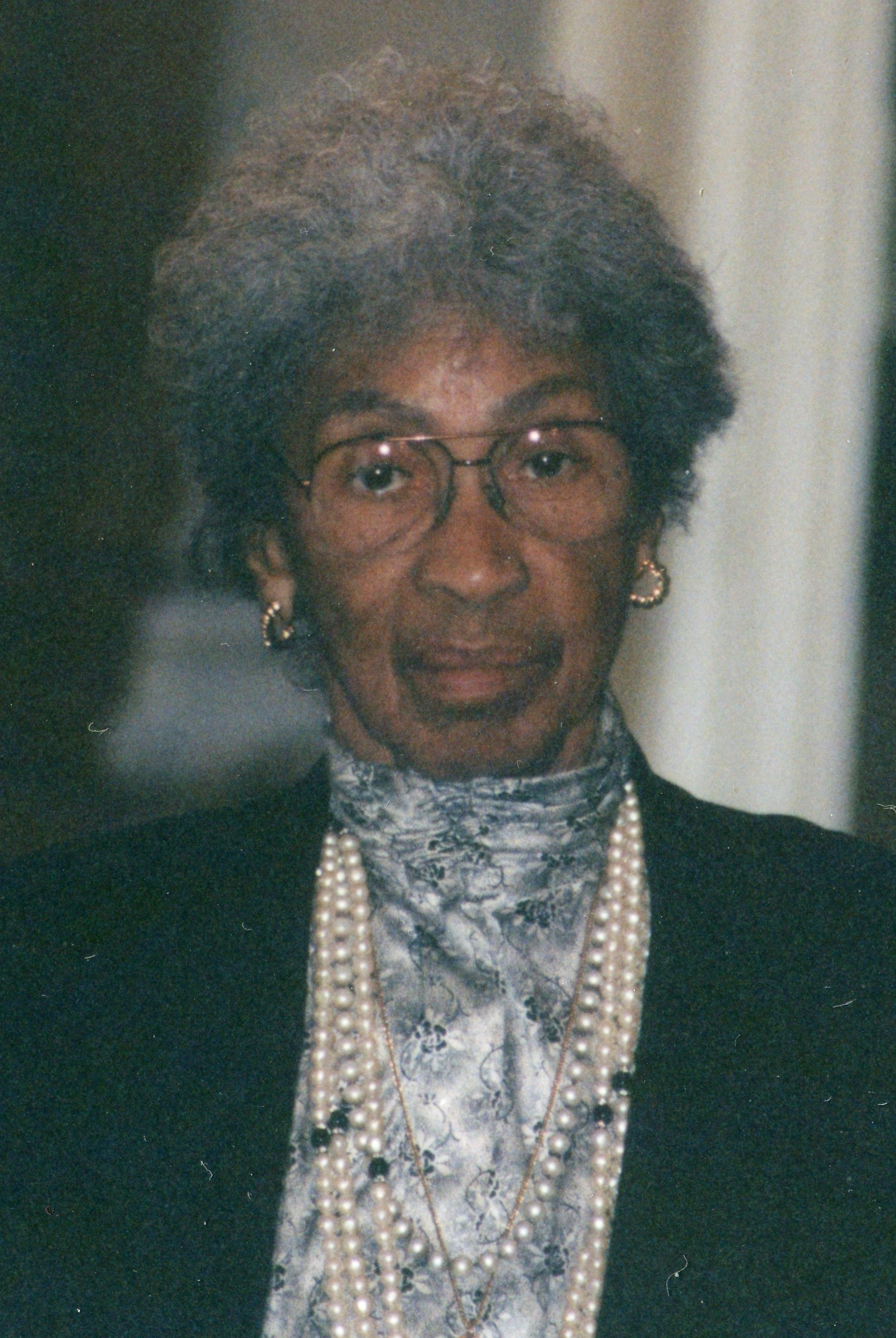

Nominee	Phil Mendelson	David Catania	Hilda Mason
Party	Democratic	Republican	DC Statehood
Popular vote	71,799	40,200	28,615
Percentage	37.33%	20.90%	14.88%
Nominee	Beverly J. Wilbourn	Malik Z. Shabazz	Mark Thompson
Party	Independent	Independent	Umoja
Popular vote	22,946	15,644	9,733
Percentage	11.93%	8.13%	5.06%
Councilmembers before election
David Catania (Rep.)
Hilda Mason (D.C. Statehood)
Elected Councilmembers
David Catania (Rep.)
Phil Mendelson (Dem.)

Following 21 years of service on the Council, questions about her health and a general desire for change following years of scandals and general malaise in the city led to Hilda Mason finally losing after a bid for a 6th full term. Democrat Phil Mendelson won her seat after an extremely contested primary in which he won a mere 17% plurality. Republican David Catania won re-election to his first full term in the other seat, which he had initially won a year earlier in the 1997 special election to replace Linda Cropp.

=== Democratic primary ===
Candidates

- William H. Bennett II, pastor of the First Baptist Church of Deanwood
- Charles Gaither, city employee
- Phil Mendelson, former Council staffer
- Linda Moody, Ward 8 member of the District of Columbia State Board of Education
- Phyllis J. Outlaw, lawyer
- Kathryn A. Pearson-West, activist and Advisory Neighborhood Commissioner
- Don Reeves, president of the District of Columbia State Board of Education
- Greg Rhett, community organizer
- Bill Rice, reporter for the Northwest Current
- Sabrina Sojourner, chairwoman of the Metropolitan Washington Council of Governments

Endorsements

Phil Mendelson

Publications

- The Washington Post
Linda Moody

Publications

- The Washington Post
Greg Rhett

Organizations

- Greater Washington Board of Trade

Publications

- The Washington Post
Bill Rice

Publications

- The Washington Post
Sabrina Sojourner

Organizations

- DC Association of Realtors
- Gertrude Stein Democratic Club

1998 Council of the District of Columbia At-large Democratic primary
Party	Candidate	Votes	%
Democratic	Phil Mendelson	14,089	17.13%
Democratic	Linda Moody	11,532	14.02%
Democratic	William H. Bennett II	11,336	13.78%
Democratic	Bill Rice	11,087	13.48%
Democratic	Phyllis J. Outlaw	10,769	13.09%
Democratic	Sabrina Sojourner	9,725	11.83%
Democratic	Don Reeves	4,130	5.02%
Democratic	Charles Gaither	3,721	4.52%
Democratic	Greg Rhett	2,646	3.22%
Democratic	Kathryn A. Pearson-West	2,485	3.02%
Write-in		718	0.87%
Total votes		82,238	100%

=== Republican primary ===
Candidates

- David Catania, incumbent At-large Councilmember

1998 Council of the District of Columbia At-large Republican primary
Party	Candidate	Votes	%
Republican	David Catania (inc.)	2,256	92.61%
Write-in		180	7.39%
Total votes		2,436	100%

=== Statehood primary ===
Candidates

- Hilda Mason, incumbent At-large Councilmember

1998 Council of the District of Columbia At-large D.C. Statehood primary
Party	Candidate	Votes	%
DC Statehood	Hilda Mason (inc.)	284	77.17%
Write-in		84	22.83%
Total votes		368	100%

=== Umoja primary ===
Candidates

- Mark Thompson

1998 Council of the District of Columbia At-large Umoja primary
Party	Candidate	Votes	%
Umoja	Mark Thompson	180	92.31%
Write-in		15	7.69%
Total votes		195	100%

=== Independents ===
Candidates

- Sandra Seegars
- Malik Z. Shabazz
- Beverly J. Wilbourn

Endorsements

Beverly J. Wilbourn

Local officials

- Charlene Drew Jarvis, incumbent Ward 4 Councilmember (since 1979)
- Harry Thomas Sr., incumbent Ward 5 Councilmember (since 1987)

Individuals

- Cora Masters Barry, wife of imprisoned former mayor Marion Barry

=== General election ===
1998 Council of the District of Columbia At-large election
Party	Candidate	Votes	%
Democratic	Phil Mendelson	71,799	37.33%
Republican	David Catania (inc.)	40,200	20.90%
DC Statehood	Hilda Mason (inc.)	28,615	14.88%
Independent	Beverly J. Wilbourn	22.946	11.93%
Independent	Malik Z. Shabazz	15,644	8.13%
Umoja	Mark Thompson	9,733	5.06%
Independent	Sandra Seegars	2,764	1.44%
Write-in		648	0.34%
Total votes		192,349	100%

== Ward 1 ==
1998 Council of the District of Columbia Ward 1 election
- November 3, 1998
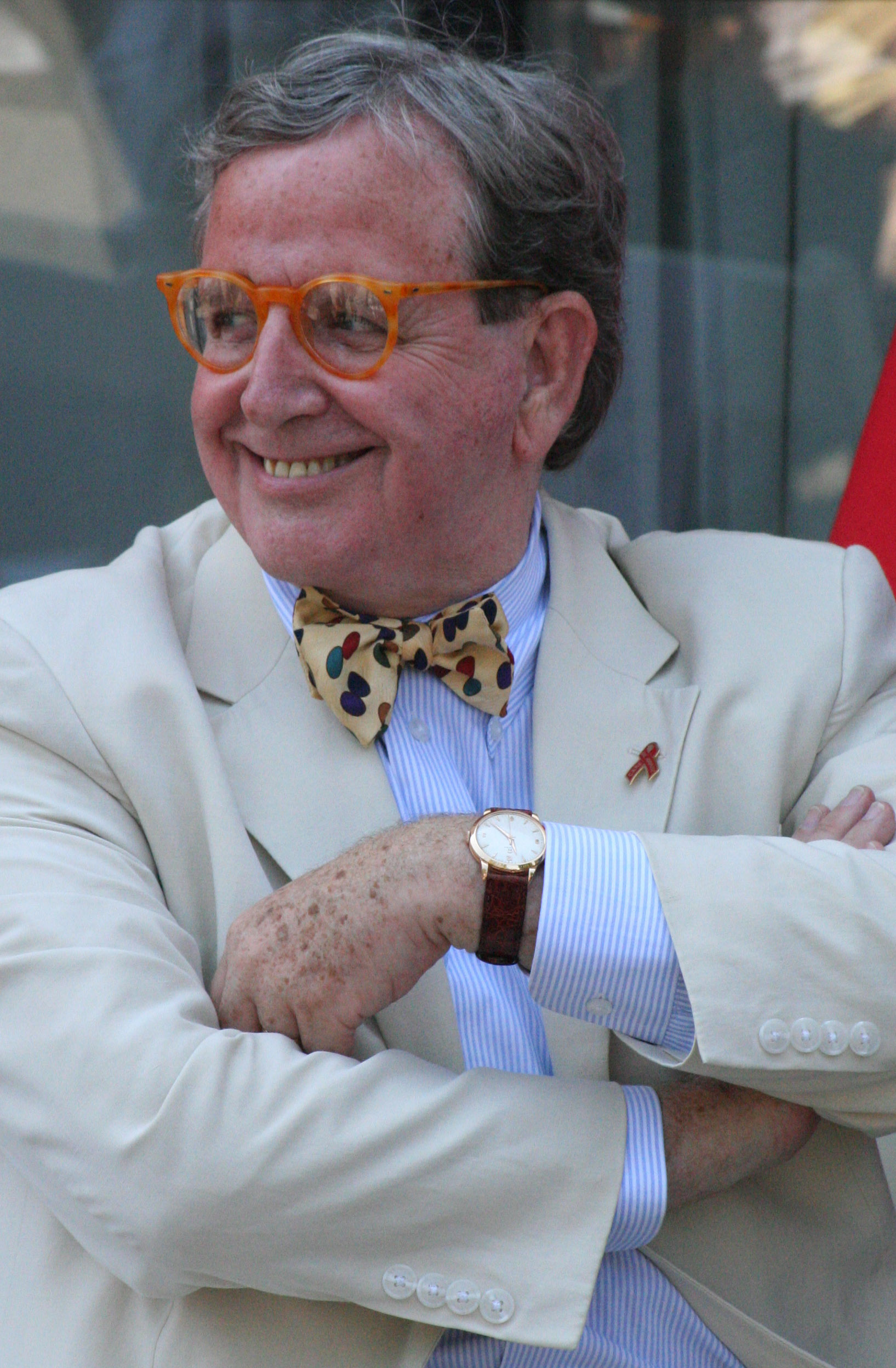

Nominee	Jim Graham	Nik Eames
Party	Democratic	Umoja
Popular vote	10,953	1,927
Percentage	72.38%	12.73%
Nominee	Scott McLarty	Mark Leventhal
Party	Green	Republican
Popular vote	1,260	868
Percentage	8.33%	5.74%
Councilmember before election
Frank Smith
Democratic
Elected Councilmember
Jim Graham
Democratic

16-year incumbent Frank Smith lost his primary to challenger Jim Graham, who won handily in the general election. Graham was the second gay person to be elected to the Council in as many years, following David Catania in 1997.

=== Democratic primary ===
Candidates

- Jim Graham, Whitman-Walker Health executive director
- Baruti Jahi, community activist
- Lenwood Orlando Johnson, former Advisory Neighborhood Commissioner
- Todd Mosley, youth activist
- Frank Smith, incumbent Ward 1 Councilmember

Endorsements

Jim Graham

Publications

- The Washington Post
Frank Smith

Labor unions

- Washington Teachers' Union

1998 Council of the District of Columbia Ward 1 Democratic primary
Party	Candidate	Votes	%
Democratic	Jim Graham	4,894	48.53%
Democratic	Frank Smith (inc.)	3,219	31.92%
Democratic	Todd Mosley	1,458	14.46%
Democratic	Lenwood Orlando Johnson	232	2.30%
Democratic	Baruti Jahi	224	2.22%
Write-in		58	0.58%
Total votes		10,085	100%

=== Green party ===
DC regulations require that in order for a party to have a primary ballot process for an election, a candidate running under the party banner must win at least 7,500 votes in an election to a major federal or city office in the previous election. In 1998 the DC branch of the Green Party of the United States did not meet these qualifications, so they did not have primary ballot access and as such had to register in a manner similar to an independent.

Candidates

- Scott McLarty, environmental activist

=== Republican primary ===
No candidates filed for the primary, with Mark Leventhal winning the nomination through write-in votes.

1998 Council of the District of Columbia Ward 1 Republican primary
Party	Candidate	Votes	%
	Write-in	59	100%
Total votes		59	100%

=== Umoja primary ===
Candidates

- Nik Eames, engineering student at Howard University and Advisory Neighborhood Commissioner

1998 Council of the District of Columbia Ward 1 Umoja primary
Party	Candidate	Votes	%
Umoja	Nik Eames	16	88.89%
Write-in		2	11.11%
Total votes		18	100%

=== General election ===
1998 Council of the District of Columbia Ward 1 election
Party	Candidate	Votes	%
Democratic	Jim Graham	10,953	72.38%
Umoja	Nik Eames	1,927	12.73%
Green	Scott McLarty	1,260	8.33%
Republican	Mark Leventhal	868	5.74%
Write-in		125	0.83%
Total votes		15,133	100%

== Ward 3 ==
1998 Council of the District of Columbia Ward 3 election
- November 3, 1998
Nominee	Kathleen Patterson
Party	Democratic
Popular vote	18,646
Percentage	98.00%
Councilmember before election
Kathleen Patterson
Democratic
Elected Councilmember
Kathleen Patterson
Democratic

Incumbent councilmember Kathleen Patterson won re-election to a second term, easily beating primary challenger Jim Montgomery and winning an uncontested general election.

=== Democratic primary ===
Candidates

- Jim Montgomery, lawyer
- Kathleen Patterson, incumbent Ward 3 Councilmember

Endorsements

Kathleen Patterson

Labor unions

- AFL-CIO Metropolitan Washington Council

Publications

- The Washington Post

1998 Council of the District of Columbia Ward 3 Democratic primary
Party	Candidate	Votes	%
Democratic	Kathleen Patterson (inc.)	12,065	60.09%
Democratic	Jim Montgomery	1,093	8.28%
Write-in		39	0.30%
Total votes		13,197	100%

=== General election ===
1998 Council of the District of Columbia Ward 3 election
Party	Candidate	Votes	%
Democratic	Kathleen Patterson (inc.)	18,646	98.00%
Write-in		380	2.00%
Total votes		19,026	100%

== Ward 5 ==
1998 Council of the District of Columbia Ward 5 election
- November 3, 1998
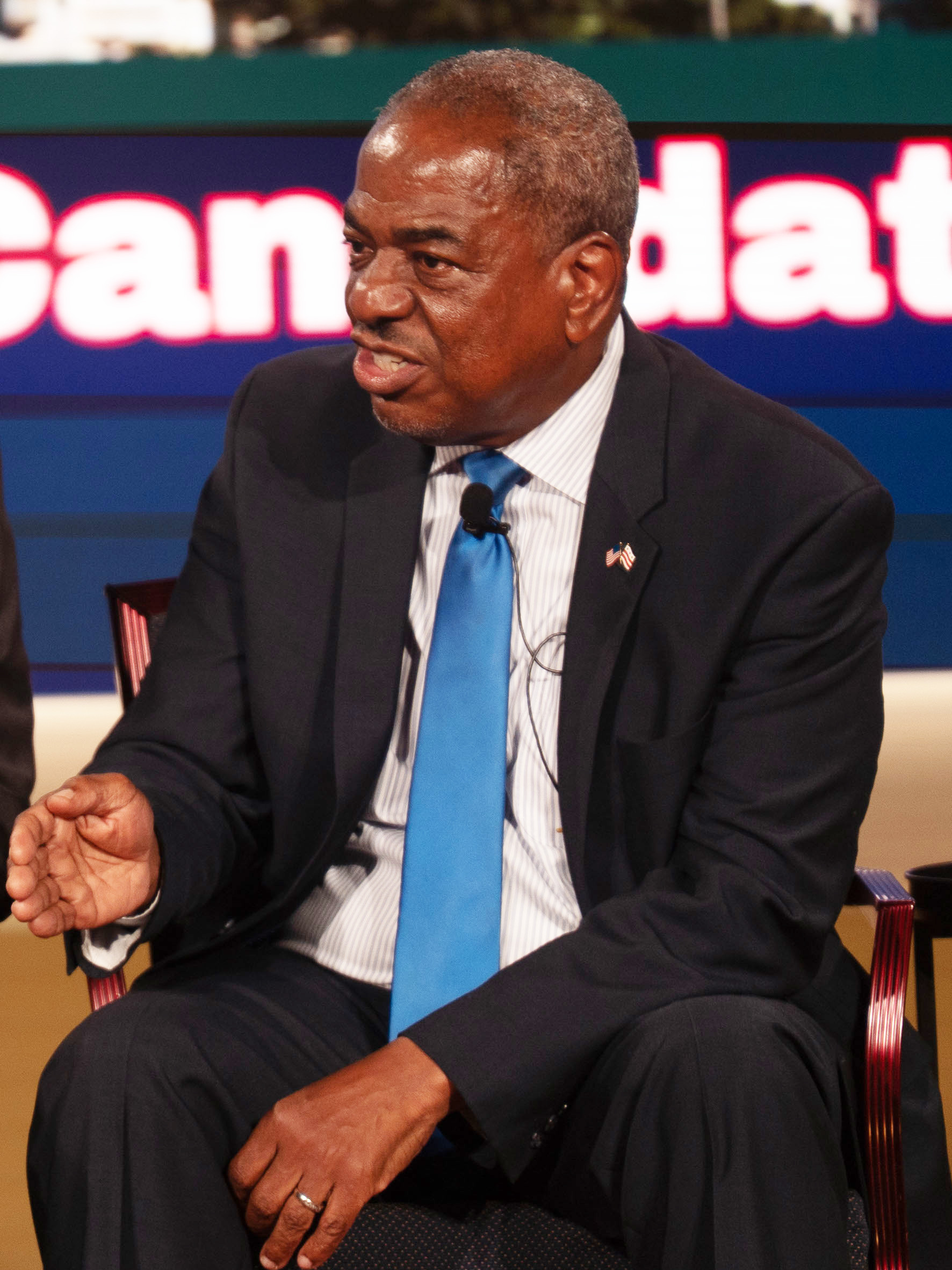

Nominee	Vincent Orange	Ian Alexander
Party	Democratic	Republican
Popular vote	14,394	1,599
Percentage	89.05%	9.89%
Councilmember before election
Harry Thomas Sr.
Democratic
Elected Councilmember
Vincent Orange
Democratic

Incumbent Councilmember Harry Thomas Sr. lost re-election to challenger Vincent Orange in the primary, who cruised to victory against Republican candidate Ian Alexander in the general election. Orange had run against and lost to Thomas in the 1994 Council of the District of Columbia election.

=== Democratic primary ===
Candidates

- William Boston, education activist
- Pat Mitchell, community activist
- Vincent Orange, lawyer and community activist
- Harry Thomas Sr., incumbent Ward 5 Councilmember
- Virgil Thompson, former Advisory Neighborhood Commissioner

Endorsements

Vincent Orange

Publications

- The Washington Post
Harry Thomas Sr.

Labor unions

- AFL-CIO Metropolitan Washington Council
- Washington Teachers' Union

1998 Council of the District of Columbia Ward 5 Democratic primary
Party	Candidate	Votes	%
Democratic	Vincent Orange	4,605	37.42%
Democratic	Harry Thomas Sr. (inc.)	4,246	34.51%
Democratic	Pat Mitchell	2,669	21.69%
Democratic	Virgil Thompson	447	3.63%
Democratic	William Boston	294	2.39%
Write-in		44	0.36%
Total votes		12,305	100%

=== Republican party ===
Candidates

- Ian Alexander, Catholic University of America student
- Edward Henry Wolterbeek, real estate broker

1998 Council of the District of Columbia Ward 5 Republican primary
Party	Candidate	Votes	%
Republican	Ian Alexander	142	67.62%
Republican	Edward Henry Wolterbeek	43	20.48%
Write-in		25	11.90%
Total votes		210	100%

=== General election ===
1998 Council of the District of Columbia Ward 5 election
Party	Candidate	Votes	%
Democratic	Vincent Orange	14,394	89.05%
Republican	Ian Alexander	1,599	9.89%
Write-in		171	1.06%
Total votes		16,164	100%

== Ward 6 ==
1998 Council of the District of Columbia Ward 6 special election
- November 3, 1998

Nominee	Sharon Ambrose	Richard de Beauvoir
Party	Democratic	Independent
Popular vote	13,906	1,106
Percentage	91.72%	7.30%
Councilmember before election
Sharon Ambrose
Democratic
Elected Councilmember
Sharon Ambrose
Democratic

After winning a plurality in the 1997 special election, incumbent Councilmember Sharon Ambrose easily won a rematch against main primary challenger George Augustus Stallings Jr. and cleaned up in the general election against independent Richard de Beauvoir.

=== Democratic primary ===
- Sharon Ambrose, incumbent Ward 6 Councilmember
- Benjamin Bonham, Ward 6 member of the District of Columbia State Board of Education
- George Augustus Stallings Jr., founder of the African-American Catholic Congregation

Endorsements

Sharon Ambrose

Labor unions

- AFL-CIO Metropolitan Washington Council

Publications

- The Washington Post

1998 Council of the District of Columbia Ward 6 Democratic primary
Party	Candidate	Votes	%
Democratic	Sharon Ambrose (inc.)	6,406	55.57%
Democratic	George Augustus Stallings Jr.	3,219	27.93%
Democratic	Benjamin Bonham	1,807	15.68%
Write-in		95	0.82%
Total votes		11,527	100%

=== Independents ===
Candidates

- Richard de Beauvoir, communications consultant

=== General election ===
1998 Council of the District of Columbia Ward 6 election
Party	Candidate	Votes	%
Democratic	Sharon Ambrose (inc.)	13,906	91.72%
Independent	Richard de Beauvoir	1,106	7.30%
Write-in		149	0.98%
Total votes		15,161	100%
