= 1994 Council of the District of Columbia election =

U.S. election

- November 8, 1994

7 seats on the Council of the District of Columbia 7 seats needed for a majority
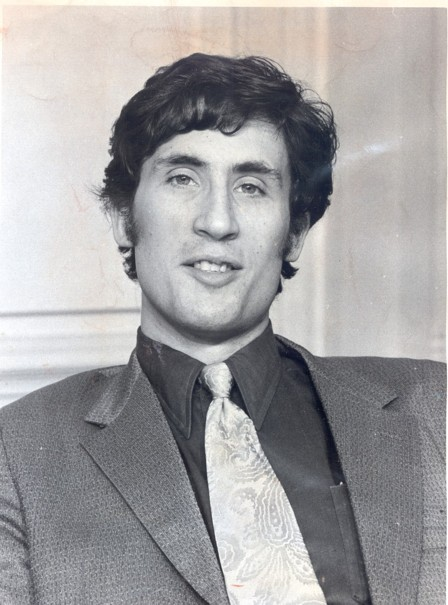

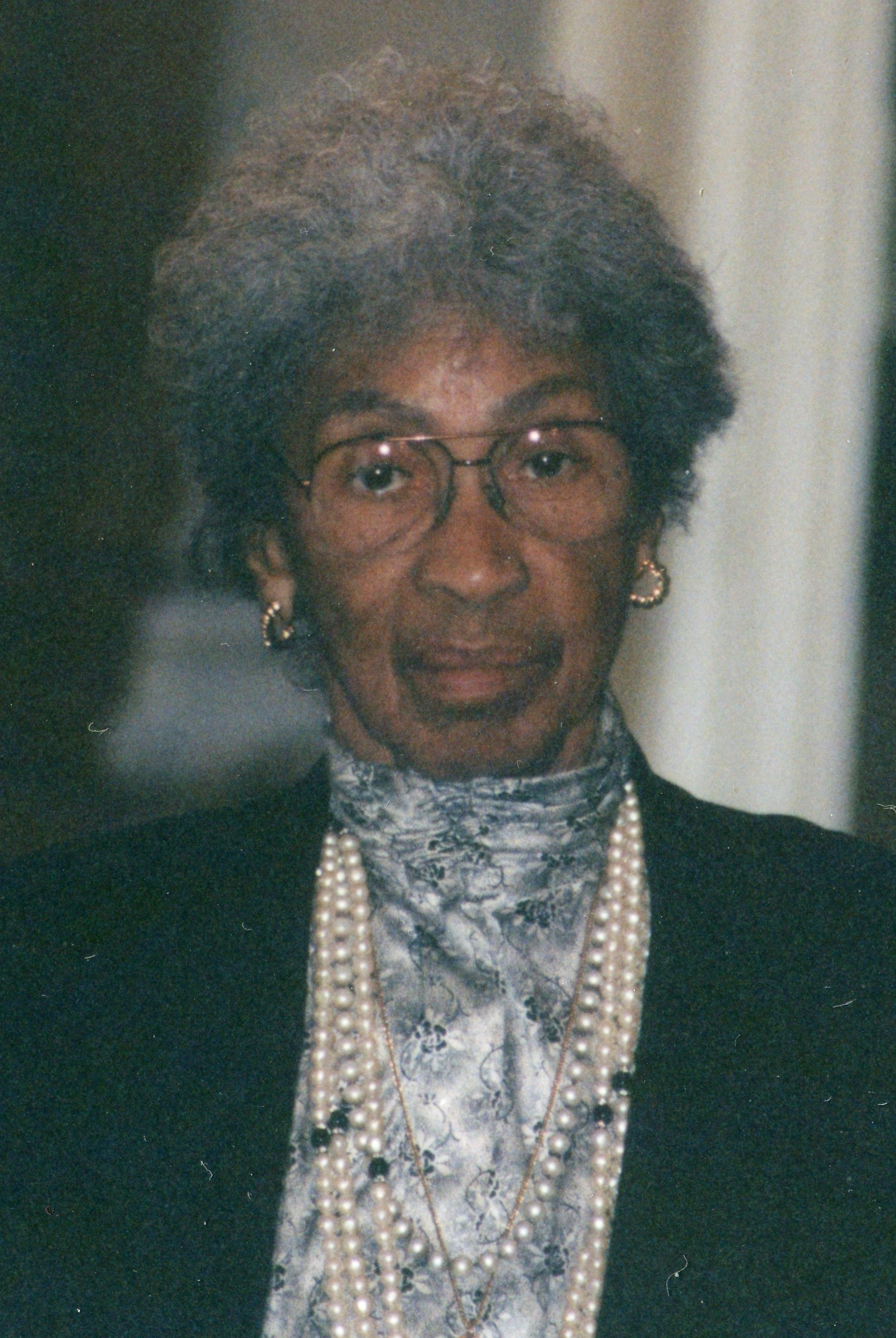

	Majority party	Minority party	Third party
Leader	David A. Clarke	Hilda Mason	William Lightfoot
Party	Democratic	DC Statehood	Independent
Seats before	10	1	1
Seats after	10	1	1
Seat change	Steady	Steady	Steady

The 1994 general election for the Council of the District of Columbia was held on November 8, with primaries taking place on September 13. David A. Clarke was reelected to his previously-held position as Council chairman, reentering the Council after his departure for a failed mayoral bid in 1990. All incumbents were reelcted except for Jim Nathanson, who lost his Ward 3 primary to challenger Kathleen Patterson

== Summary ==
Democrats remained the largest party on the council, with no seats being lost to other parties or independents.

=== At-large ===
Position	Incumbent				Candidates
Position	Member	Party	First elected	Status	Candidates
Chairperson	David A. Clarke	Democratic	1993 (special)	Incumbent re-elected.	▌ ✓ David A. Clarke 81.7%; ▌ Mark Thompson 7.5%; ▌ Minton Francis 7.3%; ▌ Jephunneh Lawrence 2.9%
At-large	Linda Cropp	Democratic	1990	Incumbent re-elected.	▌ ✓ Linda Cropp 45.9%; ▌ ✓ Hilda Mason 14.9%; ▌ R. David Hall 13.5%; ▌ Harry M. Singleton 3.9%; ▌ Jerry More III 8.6%; ▌ Kemry Hughes 3.4%; ▌ Charles J. Moreland 2.1%; ▌ David Asher Garrett 1.4%
At-large	Hilda Mason	D.C. Statehood	1977 (special)	Incumbent re-elected.	▌ ✓ Linda Cropp 45.9%; ▌ ✓ Hilda Mason 14.9%; ▌ R. David Hall 13.5%; ▌ Harry M. Singleton 3.9%; ▌ Jerry More III 8.6%; ▌ Kemry Hughes 3.4%; ▌ Charles J. Moreland 2.1%; ▌ David Asher Garrett 1.4%

=== Wards ===
Position	Incumbent				Candidates
Position	Member	Party	First elected	Status	Candidates
Ward 1	Frank Smith	Democratic	1982	Incumbent re-elected.	▌ ✓ Frank Smith 70.2%; ▌ Arturo Griffiths 10.5%; ▌ Marty Pearl 7.2%; ▌ Ernest Johnson 5.8%; ▌ Alejandro Arce 3.7%; ▌ Bob Clifton 2.0%
Ward 3	Jim Nathanson	Democratic	1986	Incumbent lost re-election. New councilmember elected. Democratic hold.	▌ ✓ Kathleen Patterson 76.6%; ▌ Philip Murphy 20.8%; ▌ John Hardison 2.3%
Ward 5	Harry Thomas Sr.	Democratic	1986	Incumbent re-elected.	▌ ✓ Harry Thomas Sr. 69.1%; ▌ Jeffrey G. Desmukes 16.5%; ▌ Dexter Chadwick 4.8%; ▌ William Howard Link 4.7%; ▌ Carlton G. Hawkins 4.2%
Ward 6	Harold Brazil	Democratic	1990	Incumbent re-elected.	▌ ✓ Harold Brazil 91.19%; ▌ Robert Bramson 8.30%

== Chairperson ==
1994 Council of the District of Columbia Chairperson election
- November 8, 1994
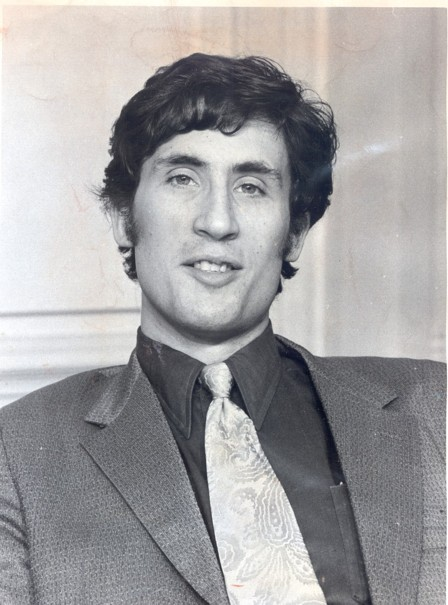

Nominee	David A. Clarke	Mark Thompson	Minton Francis
Party	Democratic	Umoja	Republican
Popular vote	139,879	12,843	12,419
Percentage	81.73%	7.50%	7.26%
Chairperson before election
David A. Clarke
Democratic
Elected Chairperson
David A. Clarke
Democratic

David A. Clarke was reelected to a full term as chairperson of the Council following his victory in the 1993 special election.

=== Democratic primary ===
Candidates

- David A. Clarke

1994 Council of the District of Columbia Chairperson Democratic primary
Party	Candidate	Votes	%
Democratic	David A. Clarke (inc.)	110,288	96.60%
Write-in		3,887	3.40%
Total votes		114,175	100%

=== Republican primary ===
No candidates filed for the primary, with Minton Francis winning the nomination through write-in votes.

1994 Council of the District of Columbia Chairperson Republican primary
Party	Candidate	Votes	%
	Write-in	611	100%
Total votes		611	100%

=== Independents ===
Candidates

- Jephunneh Lawrence

=== General election ===
1994 Council of the District of Columbia Chairperson election
Party	Candidate	Votes	%
Democratic	David A. Clarke (inc.)	139,879	81.73%
Umoja	Mark Thompson	12,843	7.50%
Republican	Minton Francis	12,419	7.26%
Independent	Jephunneh Lawrence	5,000	2.92%
Write-in		1,014	0.32%
Total votes		171,155	100%

== At-large ==
1994 Council of the District of Columbia At-large election
- November 8, 1994
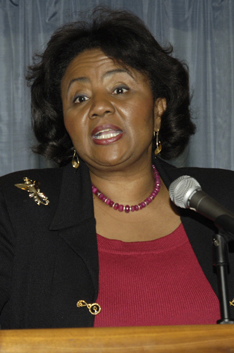

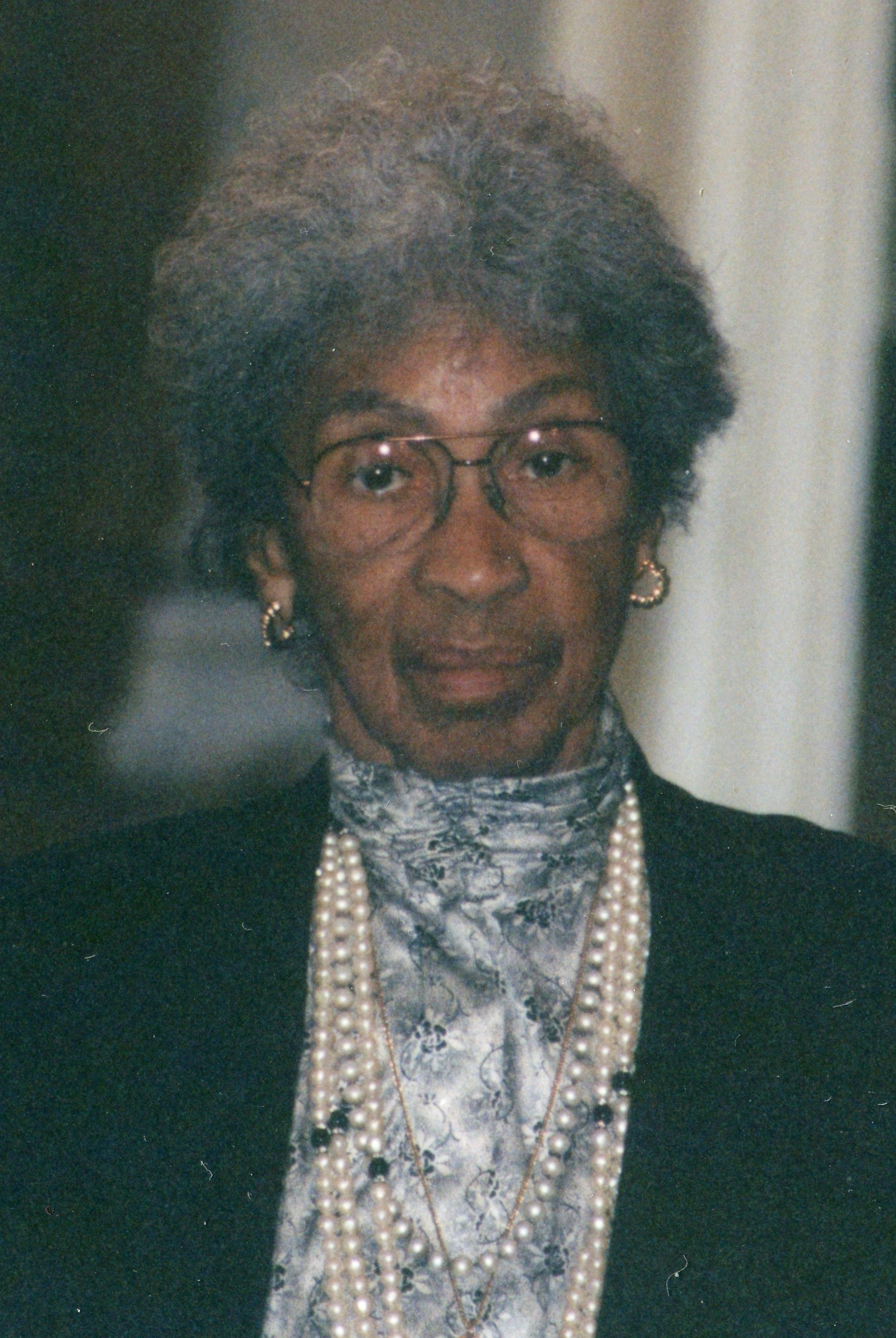

Nominee	Linda Cropp	Hilda Mason	R. David Hall
Party	Democratic	DC Statehood	Independent
Popular vote	106,414	34,541	31,260
Percentage	45.86%	14.89%	13.47%
Nominee	Harry M. Singleton	Jerry More III	Kemry Hughes
Party	Republican	Independent	Umoja
Popular vote	23,096	19,864	7,929
Percentage	9.95%	8.56%	3.42%
Councilmembers before election
Linda Cropp (Dem.)
Hilda Mason (D.C. Statehood)
Elected Councilmembers
Linda Cropp (Dem.)
Hilda Mason (D.C. Statehood)

Democratic incumbent Linda Cropp and Statehood incumbent Hilda Mason were both re-elected to the Council. The newly-founded Umoja Party successfully petitioned to appear on the ballot, with Kemry Hughes running under the banner.

=== Democratic primary ===
Candidates

- Linda Cropp
- Eddie Rhodes
- Karen Shook

1994 Council of the District of Columbia At-large Democratic primary
Party	Candidate	Votes	%
Democratic	Linda Cropp (inc.)	85,353	69.59%
Democratic	Karen Shook	26,017	21.21%
Democratic	Eddie Rhodes	9,545	7.78%
Write-in		1,743	1.42%
Total votes		122,658	100%

=== Statehood primary ===
Candidates

- John T. Harvey
- Sam Jordan
- Hilda Mason
- Darryl Wiggins

1994 Council of the District of Columbia At-large D.C. Statehood primary
Party	Candidate	Votes	%
DC Statehood	Hilda Mason (inc.)	346	38.83%
DC Statehood	Sam Jordan	234	26.26%
DC Statehood	Darryl Wiggins	169	18.97%
DC Statehood	John T. Harvey	101	11.34%
Write-in		41	4.60%
Total votes		891	100%

=== Republican primary ===
- Harry M. Singleton

1994 Council of the District of Columbia At-large Republican primary
Party	Candidate	Votes	%
Republican	Harry M. Singleton	3,964	94.47%
Write-in		232	5.53%
Total votes		4,196	100%

=== Independents ===
Candidates

- David Asher Garrett
- R. David Hall
- Jerry More III
- Charles J. Moreland

=== General election ===
1994 Council of the District of Columbia At-large election
Party	Candidate	Votes	%
Democratic	Linda Cropp (inc.)	106,414	45.86%
DC Statehood	Hilda Mason (inc.)	34,541	14.89%
Independent	R. David Hall	31,260	13.47%
Republican	Harry M. Singleton	23,096	9.95%
Independent	Jerry More III	19,864	8.56%
Umoja	Kemry Hughes	7,929	3.42%
Independent	Charles J. Moreland	4,921	2.12%
Independent	David Asher Garrett	3,282	1.41%
Write-in		738	0.32%
Total votes		232,045	100%

== Ward 1 ==
1994 Council of the District of Columbia Ward 1 election
- November 8, 1994
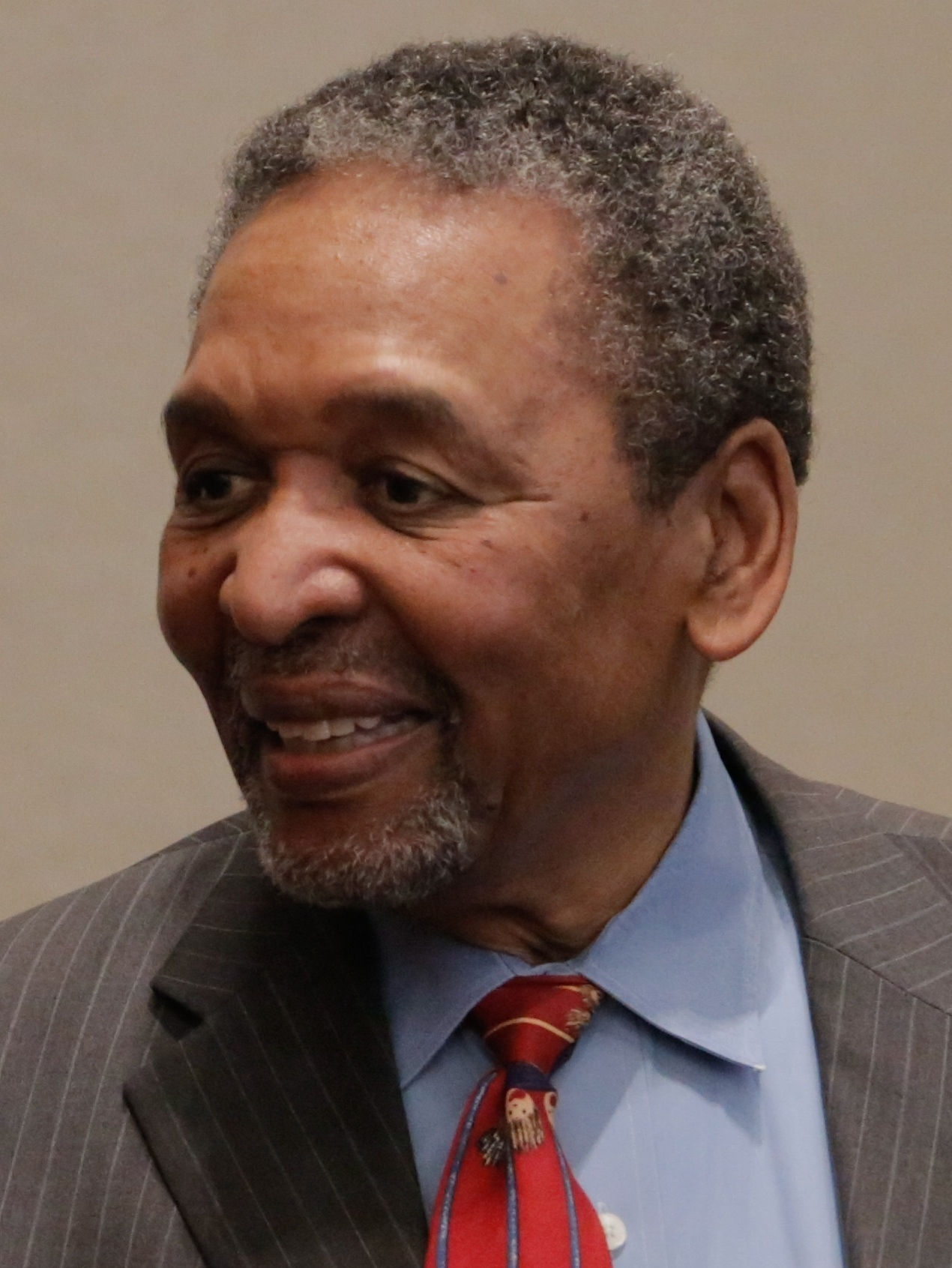

Nominee	Frank Smith	Arturo Griffiths	Marty Pearl
Party	Democratic	Independent	Republican
Popular vote	12,200	1,832	1,250
Percentage	70.17%	10.54%	7.19%
Councilmember before election
Frank Smith
Democratic
Elected Councilmember
Frank Smith
Democratic

Incumbent councilmember Frank Smith won re-election to his fourth term on the Council.

=== Democratic primary ===
Candidates

- Dorothy A. Brizill
- Ken Fealing
- Stan Mayes
- Lavert C. Seabron
- Frank Smith

1994 Council of the District of Columbia Ward 1 Democratic primary
Party	Candidate	Votes	%
Democratic	Frank Smith (inc.)	6,367	46.15%
Democratic	Dorothy A. Brizill	4,798	34.78%
Democratic	Ken Fealing	1,577	11.4%
Democratic	Stan Mayes	526	3.81%
Democratic	Lavert C. Seabron	427	3.09%
Write-in		209	5.20%
Total votes		13,797	100%

=== Republican primary ===
No candidates filed for the primary, with Marty Pearl winning the nomination through write-in votes.

1994 Council of the District of Columbia Ward 1 Republican primary
Party	Candidate	Votes	%
	Write-in	86	100%
Total votes		86	100%

=== Independents ===
Candidates

- Alejandro Arce
- Bob Clifton
- Arturo Griffiths
- Ernest Johnson

=== General Election ===
1994 Council of the District of Columbia Ward 1 election
Party	Candidate	Votes	%
Democratic	Frank Smith (inc.)	12,200	70.17%
Independent	Arturo Griffiths	1,832	10.54%
Republican	Marty Pearl	1,250	7.19%
Independent	Ernest Johnson	1,009	5.80%
Independent	Alejandro Arce	647	3.72%
Independent	Bob Clifton	339	1.95%
Write-in		110	0.63%
Total votes		17,387	100%

== Ward 3 ==
1994 Council of the District of Columbia Ward 3 election
- November 8, 1994

Nominee	Kathleen Patterson	Philip Murphy	John Hardison
Party	Democratic	Republican	Independent
Popular vote	21,098	5,726	632
Percentage	76.62%	20.79%	2.30%
Councilmember before election
Jim Nathanson
Democratic
Elected Councilmember
Kathleen Patterson
Democratic

Incumbent councilmember Jim Nathanson lost his primary to challenger Kathleen Patterson, who handily won the general election

=== Democratic primary ===
Candidates

- Jim Montgomery
- Jim Nathanson
- Kathleen Patterson

1994 Council of the District of Columbia Ward 3 Democratic primary
Party	Candidate	Votes	%
Democratic	Kathleen Patterson	10,538	60.09%
Democratic	Jim Nathanson (inc.)	6,670	38.03%
Democratic	Jim Montgomery	303	1.73%
Write-in		27	0.15%
Total votes		17,538	100%

=== Republican primary ===
Candidates

- Philip Murphy

1994 Council of the District of Columbia Ward 3 Republican primary
Party	Candidate	Votes	%
Republican	Philip Murphy	1,503	95.31%
Write-in		74	4.69%
Total votes		1,577	100%

=== Independents ===
Candidates

- John Hardison

=== General Election ===
1994 Council of the District of Columbia Ward 3 election
Party	Candidate	Votes	%
Democratic	Kathleen Patterson	21,098	76.62%
Republican	Philip Murphy	5,726	20.79%
Independent	John Hardison	632	2.30%
Write-in		80	0.29%
Total votes		27,536	100%

== Ward 5 ==
1994 Council of the District of Columbia Ward 5 election
- November 8, 1994

Nominee	Harry Thomas Sr.	Jeffrey G. Desmukes	Dexter Chadwick
Party	Democratic	Independent	DC Statehood
Popular vote	13,804	3,296	968
Percentage	69.06%	16.49%	4.84%
Councilmember before election
Harry Thomas Sr.
Democratic
Elected Councilmember
Harry Thomas Sr.
Democratic

Incumbent councilmember Harry Thomas Sr. won re-election to a third term.

=== Democratic primary ===
Candidates

- Robert Artisst
- Joseph Bowser
- James Chappelle
- Angelyn S. Flowers
- James W. Johnson
- Ron Magnus
- Vincent Orange
- Kathryn A. Pearson-West
- Roland Rier
- Harry Thomas Sr.

1994 Council of the District of Columbia Ward 5 Democratic primary
Party	Candidate	Votes	%
Democratic	Harry Thomas Sr. (inc.)	7,543	39.05%
Democratic	Vincent Orange	3,252	16.83%
Democratic	Ron Magnus	2,744	14.2%
Democratic	Angelyn S. Flowers	1,695	8.77%
Democratic	Robert Artisst	1,421	7.36%
Democratic	Roland Rier	813	4.21%
Democratic	James Chappelle	610	3.16%
Democratic	Kathryn A. Pearson-West	588	3.04%
Democratic	Joseph Bowser	326	1.69%
Democratic	240	1.24	14.2%
Write-in		85	0.44%
Total votes		19,317	100%

=== Republican primary ===
Candidates

- William Howard Link

1994 Council of the District of Columbia Ward 5 Republican primary
Party	Candidate	Votes	%
Republican	William Howard Link	239	83.28%
Write-in		48	16.72%
Total votes		287	100%

=== Statehood primary ===
No candidates filed for the primary, with Dexter Chadwick winning the nomination through write-in votes.

1994 Council of the District of Columbia Ward 5 Statehood primary
Party	Candidate	Votes	%
	Write-in	61	100%
Total votes		61	100%

=== Independents ===
Candidates

- Jeffrey G. Desmukes
- Carlton R. Hawkins

=== General Election ===
1994 Council of the District of Columbia Ward 5 election
Party	Candidate	Votes	%
Democratic	Harry Thomas Sr. (inc.)	13,804	69.06%
Independent	Jeffrey G. Desmukes	3,296	16.49%
DC Statehood	Dexter Chadwick	968	4.84%
Republican	William Howard Link	946	4.73%
Independent	Carlton G. Hawkins	841	4.21%
Write-in		133	0.67%
Total votes		19,988	100%

== Ward 6 ==
1994 Council of the District of Columbia Ward 6 election
- November 8, 1994
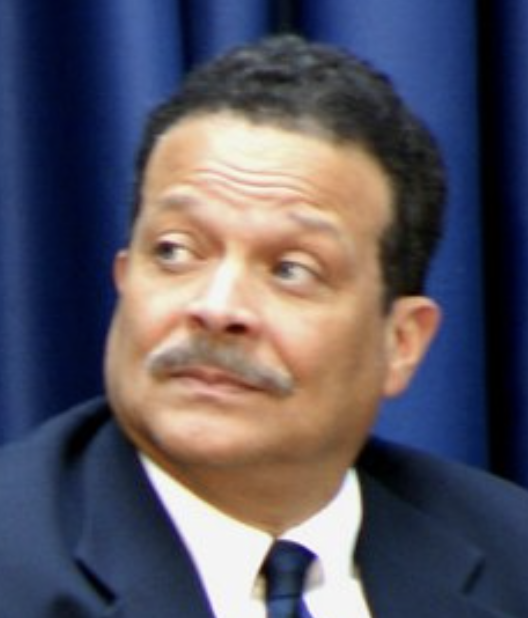

Nominee	Harold Brazil	Robert Bramson
Party	Democratic	Republican
Popular vote	18,066	1,644
Percentage	91.19%	8.30%
Councilmember before election
Harold Brazil
Democratic
Elected Councilmember
Harold Brazil
Democratic

Incumbent councilmember Harold Brazil won re-election to a second term.

=== Democratic primary ===
Candidates

- Harold Brazil
- David A. Gilmore
- Lawrence Gray

1994 Council of the District of Columbia Ward 6 Democratic primary
Party	Candidate	Votes	%
Democratic	Harold Brazil (inc.)	12,419	73.06%
Democratic	Lawrence Gray	2,763	16.25%
Democratic	David A. Gilmore	1,614	9.50%
Write-in		202	1.19%
Total votes		16,998	100%

=== Republican primary ===
No candidates filed for the primary, with Robert Bramson winning the nomination through write-in votes.

1994 Council of the District of Columbia Ward 6 Republican primary
Party	Candidate	Votes	%
	Write-in	119	100%
Total votes		119	100%

=== General Election ===
1994 Council of the District of Columbia Ward 6 election
Party	Candidate	Votes	%
Democratic	Harold Brazil (inc.)	18,066	91.19%
Republican	Robert Bramson	1,644	8.30%
Write-in		101	0.51%
Total votes		19,811	100%
