= Jim Graham =

Scottish-born American politician (1945–2017)

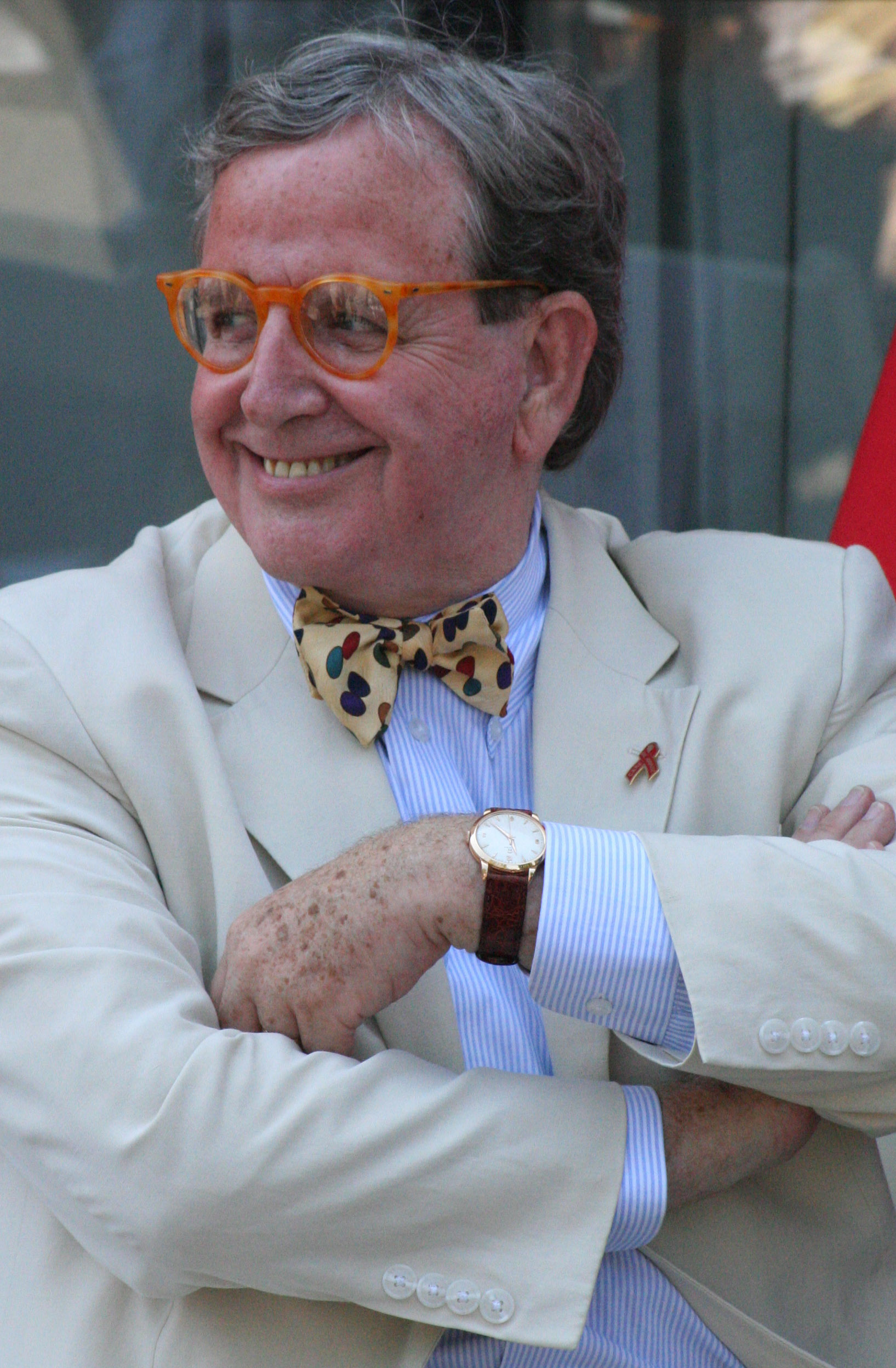

Member of the Council of the District of Columbia from Ward 1
- In office January 2, 1999 – January 2, 2015
- Preceded by: Frank Smith
- Succeeded by: Brianne Nadeau

Personal details
- Born: James McMillan Nielson Graham; August 26, 1945 Wishaw, Scotland, UK
- Died: June 11, 2017 (aged 71) Washington, D.C., U.S.
- Resting place: Congressional Cemetery
- Party: Democratic
- Education: Michigan State University (BA); University of Michigan (JD); Georgetown University (LLM)

James McMillan Nielson Graham (August 26, 1945 – June 11, 2017) was a Scottish-born American politician and a member of the Council of the District of Columbia. As a Democrat he represented Ward 1 in Washington, D.C. from 1999 until 2015.

== Life and education ==
Graham was born on August 26, 1945, in Wishaw, Scotland. Graham's parents, neither of whom had high school degrees, settled in Hyattsville, Maryland, after immigrating to the United States from Scotland.

A graduate of Michigan State University where he was a student politician and vice president of the National Student Association, Graham received a J.D. degree from the University of Michigan Law School and a L.L.M. from Georgetown University Law Center.

Graham worked as a clerk for Chief Justice Earl Warren and held a staff attorney position with the U.S. Senate Governmental Affairs Committee (chaired by Senator Abe Ribicoff, D-Connecticut). Graham served as an adjunct professor at Georgetown University Law Center and George Washington University, as well as supervising instructor at the University of Wisconsin Law School. Graham was licensed to practice law in the District of Columbia and before the U.S. Supreme Court.

Prior to taking a seat on the city council, Graham was executive director of the Whitman-Walker Clinic, a nonprofit organization providing services to people in Washington who have HIV and AIDS. Graham was a recovering alcoholic and came out as gay after leaving federal employment. He was the second openly gay elected official in D.C., after David Catania.

== Gay community ==
In October 1979, Graham joined Whitman-Walker Clinic's board. He helped the clinic survive its initial funding crises and in April 1981 became president of the board. Within three years, he became the executive director, leading the clinic's response to AIDS for 15 years (1984–1999). Under his leadership the clinic became a leading HIV/AIDS institution, with more than 1,200 volunteers, 270 full-time employees, and satellite operations in Southeast Washington, Maryland and Virginia. When Graham left Whitman-Walker in January 1999, it had become one of the most comprehensive community based medical organizations responding to HIV/AIDS in the country.

In 1984, dismayed by the quality of legal support, Graham himself undertook the legal aid counseling of those with AIDS for 18 months: "I went to dying people to straighten out their legal affairs ... in addition to other duties. It carried me right into the trenches; it created the whole experience. I vividly remember going to the bedsides, the horrible circumstances. ... It was extremely emotional." In an oral history for the Rainbow History Project, Graham commented, "We've had one of the greatest epidemics of all time and this was the history, the history of the community banding together and helping itself. It was a phenomenal story." He says of the time,

"It was the most difficult period that I've ever been through, there's no question."

== Public service ==
Graham was first elected in 1998 and won reelection in 2002, 2006, and 2010 but was defeated in his bid for a fifth term in the Democratic primary election on April 1, 2014, by a margin of 41 percent to 59 percent for challenger Brianne Nadeau.

Graham served as chairman of the Washington Metropolitan Area Transit Authority's board of directors twice—once in 2003 and again in 2009.

In 1999 and 2007, Graham donated a large collection of his personal and professional papers to the George Washington University. The collection is under the care of GWU's Special Collections Research Center, located in the Estelle and Melvin Gelman Library.

Committees

Graham served as a member of the following committees on the D.C. Council:

- Committee on Human Services (Chair)
- Committee of the Whole
- Committee on Business, Consumer and Regulatory Affairs
- Committee on Transportation and the Environment
- Committee on Workforce and Community Affairs

== Death ==
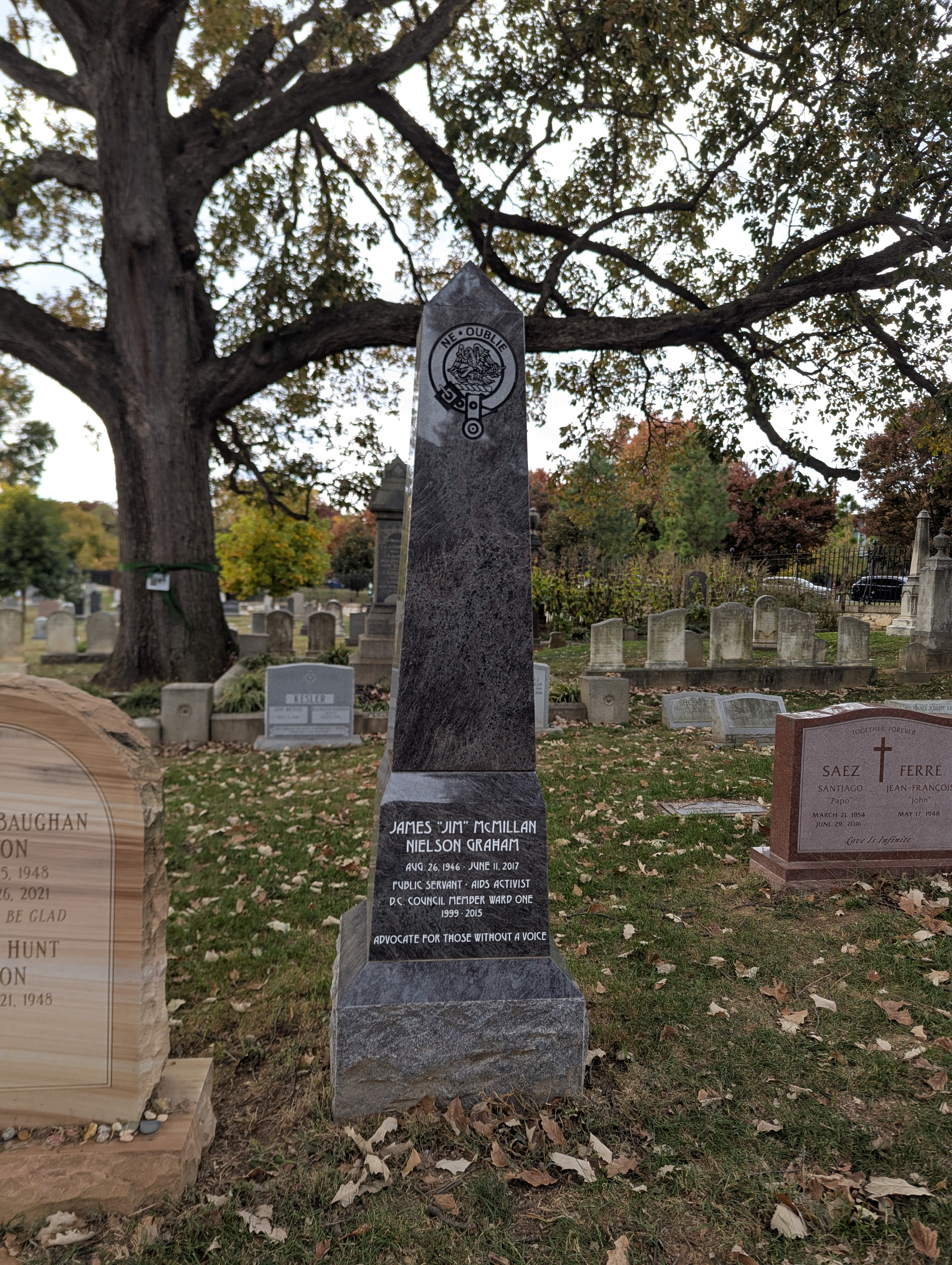
Graham's grave marker at Congressional Cemetery

Graham died June 11, 2017, at George Washington University Hospital from complications related to an infection and from chronic obstructive pulmonary disease (COPD).

== Organizations ==
- D.C. AIDS Task Force (member since 1983)
- AIDS Action Council (previous Board member)
- National Lesbian and Gay Health Foundation (previous Board member)
- Coalition for Consumers Health and Safety
- Washington AIDS Partnership (previous Advisory Committee member)
- Concerned Citizens on Alcohol and Drug Abuse, Inc. (previous Advisory Board member)
- National AIDS Network (previous Treasurer and Board member)
- Rock Hard DC Strip Club

== Criticism ==
In early 2005, Graham was accused (allegedly by Washington businessman Sinclair Skinner) of driving historically African-American businesses from the neighborhoods of Columbia Heights, Shaw, and the U Street corridor. The Washington City Paper reported on the accusation:

In early 2005, just as the Club U issue was heating up, posters portraying Graham as a reptile holding a pitchfork labeled "Grahamzilla" appeared on light poles and street signs around the ward. Another set of posters depicted Graham standing on a porch partying with young white men at the Graham "plantation." The latter included an illustration showing "Graham opponents" hanging from a gallows. The posters stretched the limits of political speech and disappeared quickly after they were put up.

On September 24, 2009, Graham's Chief of Staff, Ted Loza, was arrested by the FBI and charged with two counts of accepting bribes. The indictment alleges that Loza accepted two payments and promised to promote the legislation and policies concerning D.C. taxi cabs that the alleged briber wanted. Graham was the chairman of the committee that oversees taxi cab regulation, but voluntarily gave up oversight of cabs after Loza's arrest.

The District of Columbia Board of Ethics and Government Accountability found substantial evidence that Graham asked a developer to withdraw its bid for a real estate project so that another firm, who had donated to Graham, could win the bid. In exchange, Graham offered to support the firm's bid for a lottery contract, violating the District employees code of conduct. The District Council also reprimanded Graham for his inappropriate actions. Graham described his actions as political horsetrading rather than anything illegal or unethical.

== Election results ==
=== 1998 ===
1998 Democratic Primary, Council of the District of Columbia, Ward 1
Party	Candidate	Votes	%
Democratic	Jim Graham	4,894	49
Democratic	Frank Smith	3,219	32
Democratic	Todd Mosley	1,458	14
Democratic	Lenwood Orlando "Lenny" Johnson	232	2
Democratic	Baruti "BJ" Jahi	224	2
Democratic	Write-In	58	1

1998 General Election, Council of the District of Columbia, Ward 1
Party	Candidate	Votes	%
Democratic	Jim Graham	10,953	72
Umoja	Nik Earnes	1,927	13
Green	Scott McLarty	1,260	8
Republican	Mark Leventhal	868	6
	Write-In	125	1

=== 2002 ===
2002 Democratic Primary, Council of the District of Columbia, Ward 1
Party	Candidate	Votes	%
Democratic	Jim Graham	6,064	64
Democratic	Shelore Williams	1,586	17
Democratic	Dee Hunter	1,157	12
Democratic	Hector Rodriguez	436	5
Democratic	Tony De Pass	130	1
Democratic	Write-In	47	0

2002 General Election, Council of the District of Columbia, Ward 1
Party	Candidate	Votes	%
Democratic	Jim Graham	11,258	85
DC Statehood Green	Edward Chico Troy	1,910	14
	Write-In	129	1

=== 2006 ===
2006 Democratic Primary, Council of the District of Columbia, Ward 1
Party	Candidate	Votes	%
Democratic	Jim Graham	9,028	86
Democratic	Chad Williams	1,361	13
Democratic	Write-In	70	1

2006 General Election, Council of the District of Columbia, Ward 1
Party	Candidate	Votes	%
Democratic	Jim Graham	11,489	97
	Write-In	326	3

=== 2010 ===
2010 Democratic Primary, Council of the District of Columbia, Ward 1
Party	Candidate	Votes	%
Democratic	Jim Graham	8,381	57
Democratic	Jeff Smith	3,159	21
Democratic	Bryan Weaver	3,155	21
Democratic	Write-In	39	0

2010 General Election, Council of the District of Columbia, Ward 1
Party	Candidate	Votes	%
Democratic	Jim Graham	11,946	81
DC Statehood Green	Nancy Shia	1,376	9
Republican	Marc Morgan	1,137	8
	Write-In	233	2

=== 2014 ===
2014 Democratic Primary, Council of the District of Columbia, Ward 1
Party	Candidate	Votes	%
Democratic	Brianne K. Nadeau	6,688	59
Democratic	Jim Graham	4,642	41
Democratic	Write-In	57	1
