= James Nathanson =

James Nathanson may refer to:

- James Nathanson, a minor character in the American television drama 24
- James E. Nathanson, politician in Washington, D.C.
