= Polly Shackleton =

American politician (1910–1997)

Member of the Council of the District of Columbia from Ward 3
- In office January 2, 1975 – January 2, 1987
- Preceded by: Position established
- Succeeded by: James E. Nathanson

Member of the District of Columbia City Council
- In office November 3, 1967 – April 3, 1970
- Appointed by: Lyndon B. Johnson
- Preceded by: Position established
- Succeeded by: Carlton W. Veazey

Personal details
- Born: Pauline Ehrlich; June 19, 1910 Brookline, Massachusetts, U.S.
- Died: July 14, 1997 (aged 87) Washington, D.C., U.S.
- Party: Democratic
- Education: Simmons University (BA); Massachusetts Institute of Technology (attended); New School (attended)

Pauline "Polly" Ehrlich Shackleton (June 19, 1910 – July 14, 1997) was an American Democratic politician in Washington, D.C. She was elected as one of the original members of the Council of the District of Columbia in 1974 when D.C. gained home rule. She represented Ward 3 on the council from 1975 to 1987.

== Early life and career ==
Shackleton was born in Brookline, Massachusetts. Before moving to Washington, D.C., in 1939, she worked on Franklin Delano Roosevelt's presidential campaign, giving her a first taste of politics. Her early career included being an editor for Who's Who in American Art, as well as the American Art Annual. During World War II, Shackleton worked as an information specialist and researcher for the Office of War Information. She also held a position at the American Institute of Architects from 1951 to 1962.

== Political career ==
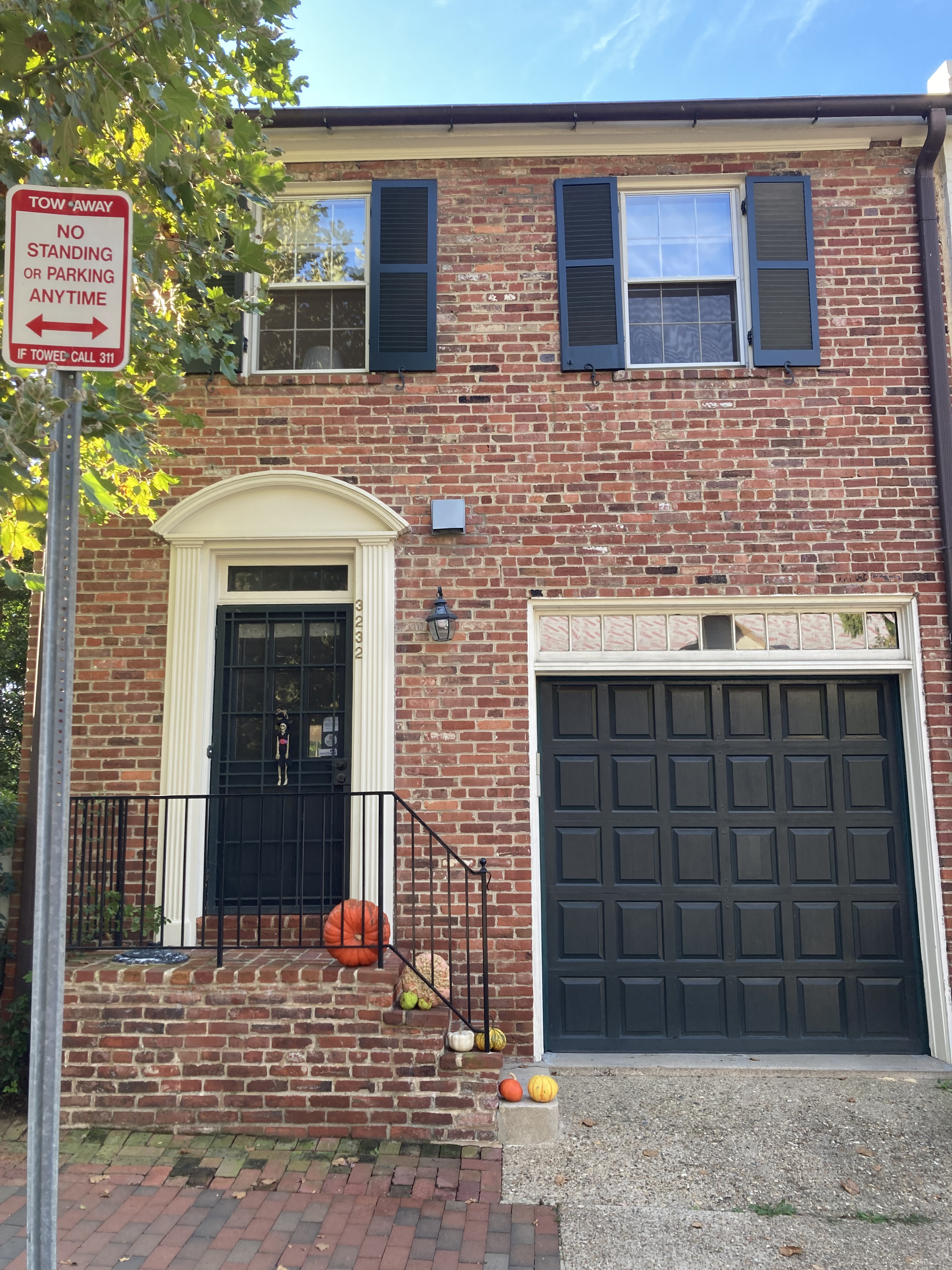
The house where Polly Shackleton lived from 1959 to 1997 in Georgetown is listed on the National Register of Historic Places.

Shackleton first participated in D.C. politics during the 1950s. When Adlai Stevenson ran for the Democratic Presidential nomination in 1952, she was actively involved in his campaign. Once Stevenson received the nomination, she became a member of the Democratic Central Committee, as well as an alternate Democratic National Committeewoman. In 1956, her political involvement expanded when she became a delegate to the Democratic National Convention and served on the platform committee. Eleven years later in 1967, President Johnson appointed Shackleton to the first D.C. City Council. When the District held its first elected Council in 1974, Shackleton received one of the seats. After being elected to additional terms in 1978 and 1982, she retired from public office in 1986. During her tenure on the Council, Shackleton served on various committees dedicated to health and welfare, citizen's rights, and childcare. She was well known for her social efforts for the poor, children, elderly, and infirm. Shackleton also advocated for District Home Rule and National Representation. When it came to issues surrounding transportation, she supported METRO legislation and the building of bicycle paths. In addition, she was an active supporter of Project Pride, a D.C. summer program involving youth who built community while beautifying various parts of the city. Her efforts in office aided in the passing of 60 pieces of legislation that later became D.C. law.
