= Sharon Ambrose =

American politician (1939–2017)

Member of the Council of the District of Columbia from Ward 6
- In office January 2, 1997 – January 2, 2007
- Preceded by: Harold Brazil
- Succeeded by: Tommy Wells

Personal details
- Born: September 3, 1939 Chicago, Illinois, U.S.
- Died: April 1, 2017 (aged 77) Washington, D.C., U.S.
- Party: Democratic
- Children: 4
- Education: Saint Xavier University (BA)

Sharon Ambrose (September 3, 1939 – April 1, 2017) was an American politician and teacher from Washington, D.C., who served as a member of the Council of the District of Columbia from 1997 to 2007, representing Ward 6 as a Democrat.

== Early life and education ==
Ambrose was born in Chicago, Illinois, on September 3, 1939. She graduated from Saint Xavier University.

== Career ==
Ambrose served on the Council of the District of Columbia from 1997 to 2007, representing Ward 6 as a Democrat. She retired after two terms to focus on an illness, which had been misdiagnosed as multiple sclerosis.

Following her retirement, Ambrose helped with the mayoral campaign of David Catania, as well as the campaign for an at-large council seat by David Grosso, a former staff person.

== Personal life and death ==
Ambrose was married and had four children. She died on April 1, 2017, at George Washington University Hospital in Washington, D.C., at the age of 77.
