= Sinclair Skinner =

American advisor and activist

Sinclair Matthew Skinner (born May 31, 1969) is an American engineer, human rights activist, political adviser, serial entrepreneur and former elected official in Washington, D.C. He is a Bitcoin and Blockchain Technology evangelist and an advocate of the advancement of African communities in relation to the African Diaspora. He holds a B.S. degree in Mechanical Engineering from Howard University and is a member of Kappa Alpha Psi fraternity. Skinner was first elected to public office in 1998 as an Advisory Neighborhood Commissioner in Washington, D.C.’s Ward 1 neighborhood.

He is currently the co-founder and CEO of Pan African Bitcoin startup Bitmari.

== Early life ==
Skinner was born on May 31,1969 in Great Falls Montana. He was raised by his father, a US Air Force officer, and his mother, a dedicated housewife.

In 1987, he enrolled in Alabama’s Tuskegee University, and was eventually elected President of the University's Student Government Association.

In 1993, the Skinner led a student protest of the “oppressive and misguided policies common at Historically Black Colleges and Universities (HBCU's)”, and organized African-Americans throughout the south in HBCU preservation efforts and demonstrations. Skinner's campus activism would force him to leave Tuskegee University and transfer to Howard University to continue his goal of becoming an engineer.

== Activism ==
In the summer of 1995 while at Howard, Skinner helped organize students nationally for the Million Man March, the largest all male march ever held in the United States with an estimated million African-American men in attendance. While at Howard, Skinner and Nik Eames worked with civil-rights giant Lawrence Guyot, who encouraged them to get involved in local politics in Washington, DC, ultimately leading them to run and win positions as advisory neighborhood commissioners—while still students.

After graduating from Howard University, Skinner purchased a former crack house across the street from Howard, and organized his neighbors to help eliminate drug trafficking on the block.

In 1999, Skinner opened the Georgia Avenue Kleaners which eventually grew to a chain of four locations. The dry-cleaners was not a financial success, but Skinner's success and reputation as a philanthropist grew within the Washington, DC African-American community.

In 2005, Skinner led a group of Howard University students and area residents in an effort to paint over gang-related graffiti in the neighborhood with a mural depicting Black historical leaders on a Howard University-owned wall near Howard's Georgia Avenue campus. The wall–which several university students and residents had complained about for years–took two weeks to paint. However, the university ordered the painting be removed after newer residents of the neighborhood complained. Skinner and the students were outraged that residents did not actively pursue the removal of the graffiti, but removed the image of Black leaders and positive families from this wall.

Skinner's Georgia Avenue organizing experience culminated when residents of D.C.’s wards 1 and 4 joined forces to reject the relocation of the Government of the District of Columbia's Department of Motor Vehicles to the intersection of Georgia Avenue and New Hampshire Avenue, just blocks from Skinner's home and dry-cleaners.

The effort forced the creation of the Georgia Avenue Steering committee which led to the smart development framework that influenced the Planned Unit Development, up-zoning and over $100M in neighborhood oriented, mixed-use developments that exists at this intersection currently.

In early 2005, Skinner accused D.C. City councilman of driving historically African-American businesses from the neighborhoods of Columbia Heights, Shaw, and the U Street corridor.

In 2009, Skinner led a group of Washington, DC activists in the donation of a retired District of Columbia fire truck and ambulance to the poverty stricken town of Sosua, Dominican Republic. However, political pressure surrounding then D.C. Mayor Adrian M. Fenty, and public backlash halted the transaction. The vehicles made it to Miami, but were ultimately returned and auctioned off as scrap metal.

In early 2011, Skinner called for an investigation into D.C. Councilman Jim Graham's involvement in a bribery scandal involving his chief of staff, Ted Loza. Loza, who had been Graham's main confidant in the Council office and who month's earlier was arrested by the FBI, had just pleaded guilty to two counts of accepting bribes. The indictment that was handed down charged that Loza had accepted cash payments in exchange for promoting legislation concerning D.C. taxi cabs until 2010 when Loza was arrested and Councilman Graham was stripped of his chairmanship, Graham had served as Chairman of the council's committee that oversees taxi cab regulation.

== Engineering ==
Skinner has worked for numerous engineering companies including Ohmeda, Inc., Honeywell, Pillsbury, McDonnell Douglas Corporation and The Architect of the Capitol where he performed testing and development for the Space Shuttle’s main engine controllers, manufacturing for a flour mill company and designed roadways in Macon County, Alabama where he was an apprentice to Curtis Pierce, the first African American county engineer in Macon County, Alabama. Skinner later became the first African American student named to the National Board of the American Society of Mechanical Engineers.

After completing his B.S. in mechanical engineering, Skinner worked in product development for Ohmeda, Inc., an international engineering company that designed incubators for premature babies.

Later, Skinner worked for the U.S. Patent and Trademark Office, and received his Engineer in Training certification in 1998. In 2007, Skinner founded Liberty Engineering and Design (LEAD), one of the few black owned engineering firms in Washington, D.C.

== Politics ==
In 1996, Skinner was the campaign manager for D.C. city council candidate Nik Eames of the “Umoja” political party. Eames became the first member of his party to get ballot representation for city council in Ward 1 of Washington, D.C.

Skinner's success organizing residents of his Georgia Avenue neighborhood in Washington, D.C. would lead to his election to the Advisory Neighborhood Commission as commissioner of jurisdiction 1B09 in 1998.

Later, Skinner would become the director of the Lower Georgia Avenue Business Association. Skinner also became publisher of The Georgia Ave Defender Newsletter, and founder of the Nile Valley Business Corridor Association–an organization that organized neighbors to “fight crime and take back their streets”.

In 2000, Skinner served as a senior campaign adviser to D.C. City Council candidate Adrian M. Fenty. Drawing from his years of experience in organizing, Skinner helped pave the way for Fenty to become the youngest member of D.C. City Council.

In 2006, Skinner helped Fenty coordinate a successful run for Mayor of Washington, D.C.

In 2012 Skinner served as Treasurer and primary donor to the super-PAC 1911 United. Backed by members of Kappa Alpha Psi and Omega Psi Phi, historically black fraternities, 1911 United aimed to raise $1.5 million toward training and organizing African-American voters in key battleground states to re-elect President Barack Obama. 1911 United also became the first super-PAC to accept bitcoins for contributions.

=== D.C. City Council investigation ===
In December 2009, Skinner was interviewed by the D.C. City Council as part of an investigation into the transfer of funds between District government agencies and his firm's subsequent award of an engineering sub-contract as part of an effort to build and renovate a dozen recreation centers, parks and public fields in the District.

The D.C. Council appointed a special Counsel to look into the transfer of funds between the government agencies as well as the contract that Skinner's company was awarded by the program management firm overseeing the contracts.

In 2011 Skinner held a news conference at the Wilson Building to share that the council's investigation into park contracts had "vindicated" him of any wrongdoing.

== Bitcoin ==
In 2015 Skinner co-founded BitMari, a Pan-African bitcoin-based financial solutions start-up, with Christopher Mapondera. Using BitMari's wallet, users can make mobile transactions across the African Diaspora using funds in the form of bitcoin.

In October 2016, Ebony Magazine reported that Skinner intends for BitMari to be a catalyst for financial empowerment in the global Black community. In that same interview he stated, “We think technology is a better method of solving problems than politics and a lot of these other things that we’re trying.”

=== Black Blockchain Summit ===
The Black Blockchain Summit, held annually at Howard University in Washington, D.C., is a gathering of approximately 1,500 mostly Black attendees focused on the intersection of cryptocurrency and social justice. The first summit was held in September 2018 and has become a widely heralded event in the crypto community. Unlike typical financial events, the summit emphasizes the potential of blockchain technology to disrupt oppressive economic systems. Sinclair Skinner, a key organizer, alongside Christopher Mapondera, co-founded BillMari, a service aimed at easing cryptocurrency transactions, particularly for the African diaspora. Their mission is to use blockchain to enhance the quality of life for marginalized communities, with a focus on reparations and economic empowerment.

Attendees, including crypto educators and market leaders, highlight the growing participation of people of color in cryptocurrency investments, which outpace other demographic groups. Skinner's personal journey into crypto was influenced by his desire to create an alternative to traditional financial systems that have historically excluded and exploited Black communities. He and Mapondera's work, such as partnering with Zimbabwe's Reserve Bank to reduce remittance fees, reflects the broader goal of decentralizing financial power and creating economic autonomy for people of African descent.

The summit's theme, "Reparations and Revolutions," underscores the belief that crypto represents an opportunity to combat systemic wealth disparities. The event brings together Black crypto innovators and experts to explore how decentralized currencies can empower Black people globally, offering both economic opportunities and a challenge to the mainstream financial system that has long perpetuated inequality. Skinner and others emphasize that blockchain could offer an alternative to centuries of wealth extraction and highlight the necessity of Black leadership in shaping the future of crypto.

== I Love Black People ==
=== I Love Black People APP ===
I Love Black People Safe Places App is a platform built by BillMari, which aims to protect Black people from racism and afrophobia around the world. They do this by Crowdsourcing Black friendly businesses from their members.

The guidebook The Negros Motorist Green Book was adapted and revamped for the app, creating the digital platform built by Black people for Black people.

First printed in 1937, the Green Book was an indispensable guide to Black friendly restaurants, hotels, gas stations, and more. The book was published during the Jim Crow laws, which enforced segregation, allowing white business owners to deny Black patrons service or even the use of the rest-room. Black people seeking assistance only to be met by a White hostile business owner could suffer life-threatening violence. Such extreme racism made difficult times for the black community in America. The green book served as a guide to safety, directing users to Black friendly establishments. The book was printed every year from 1937 to 1966.

The app is currently crowd-sourcing Black-owned and Black-friendly businesses to the digital app, making all information and resources available.

=== Global Green Book: A Black Survival Guide ===
In addition to the website and app, they have the Global Green Book: A Black Survival Guide. In 2020 the 1st edition was published, The Global Green Book: A Black Survival Guide: 2020 Healthcare Edition. This Black Survival Guide was created to help Black people access Black-owned and Black-friendly healthcare providers especially during the Covid-19 pandemic.

2020 Global Green Book: A Black Survival Guide: Healthcare Edition

2022 Global Green Book: A Black Survival Guide: Healthcare Edition

2023 Global Green Book: A Black Survival Guide: Healthcare Edition

2025 Global Green Book: A Black Survival Guide: Legal Edition

=== I Love Black People Radio Show ===
I Love Black People partnered with The Howard University Radio Network on HUR Voices-Sirius XM Station 141. I Love Black People Radio Show and is fearlessly navigating the issues relevant to Black people from an innovative perspective. They are committed to exploring how the global Black agenda meets revolutionary innovation to protect and improve the lives of Black people around the world. The show explores the cross section between emerging technologies, social and political changes and the new ways technology is transitioning how business is being done across the globe. Host Sinclair Skinner discusses these issues with special guests ranging from current/former elected officials, industry leaders, innovators, entrepreneurs, scholars, activists, and Black cultural icons. The show airs Thursday @ 9:30AM EST and is rebroadcast on Friday@5PM EST, Sunday @7:30PM EST and Tuesday @ 9:30AM EST.
