= Umoja Party =

Former far-left political party in Washington, D.C.

- Founder: Kemry Hughes, Mark Thompson
- Founded: 1993
- Dissolved: 2000
- Headquarters: Washington, D.C.
- Ideology: Afrocentrism; D.C. statehood
- Political position: Far-left
- Colors: Black

The Umoja Party was a far-left political party in the District of Columbia.

== History ==
=== Founding and 1994 general election ===
Kemry Hughes helped found the Umoja Party in December 1993, and the District of Columbia Board of Elections and Ethics approved its name on February 2, 1994. A 27-year-old student activist in favor of statehood, Hughes said the Umoja Party would focus on the specific needs of communities of people of color. Umoja is the Swahili word for unity.

Two individuals successfully petitioned to appear on the 1994 election ballot under the Umoja Party. Mark A. Thompson ran for chair of the Council of the District of Columbia, and Hughes ran for an at-large seat on the council. Thompson was a student activist and radio host. In 1990, Thompson led a protest that shut down the University of the District of Columbia for eleven days that resulted in the resignation of several members of the Board of Trustees. Hughes said he was running for office to help the disenfranchised.

Thompson received 12,843 votes in the general election, and Hughes received 7,929. Because Thompson's vote total exceeded 7,500 votes, the Umoja Party became eligible to hold primary elections, and the party secured a listing on voter registration forms.

=== 1995 special election ===
In 1995, the Umoja Party ran a candidate, Rahim Jenkins, in the special election for the Ward 8 seat on the council. Jenkins was the executive director of the D.C. Righteous Men's Commission. Jenkins received 128 votes, three percent of the total vote.

=== 1996 general election ===
With 750 registered voters, the Umoja Party fielded multiple candidates on the general election ballot in 1996. Thompson ran for the at-large seat on the council, and Jenkins ran for the Ward 8 seat on the council. Rick Malachi ran for the Ward 4 seat on the council. Malachi was a student at the University of the District of Columbia, working as a supervisor of the District's Summer Youth Employment Services program. George Pope Jr. ran for the District's shadow senator. Pope was a community activist and chair of D.C. Coalition to Save Our Schools, a group that advocated for the privatization of public schools in the District.

The Umoja Party's platform advocated for better education and medical services, preferential hiring of District residents, income tax on non-residents working in the District, ending the tax exemption for nonprofit organizations.

Thompson campaigned door-to-door, emphasizing constituent services and self-determination and reducing Congressional financial oversight. Thompson said that, while the District's mayor and Council had lax oversight of the District's finances, the degree of corruption in the District government had been exaggerated and that there were still good people working in the government.

Thompson protested the Central Intelligence Agency's admitted drug trafficking in Los Angeles to support Nicaraguan Contras. Thompson said United States Attorney Eric Holder and the Metropolitan Police Department should investigate whether the CIA was involved in drug trafficking in the District as well. Thompson was arrested at the Drug Enforcement Administration during the protest.

Malachi advocated for more public participation in the political process. He said that Council hearings and school board hearings were held in the middle of weekdays in order to silence dissent.

Thompson received 15,796 votes, enough for the Umoji Party to continue to qualify to appear on voter registration forms and hold primary elections. Malachi received 21 percent of the vote in the Ward 4 race, Jenkins received six percent in the Ward 8 race, and Pope received nine percent for shadow senator.

=== 1997 special election ===
Thompson considered moving from Ward 2 to Ward 6 to run for the Ward 6 seat on the council. Instead, Archbishop George Augustus Stallings Jr. ran for the seat under the Umoja Party. Stallings was a former Roman Catholic priest who left the Catholic Church after two former altar boys said he had raped them when they were 11 and 16 years old. Stallings founded the African American Catholic Church, which combined Catholic rites with African themes, and served as the head of Imani Temple. Stallings said he was running for office in order to improve the District's schools, finances, and independence.

Stallings said he would increase funding to social programs, such as job training, health care, education, and welfare. He supported balancing the budget through reductions in energy costs and printing costs, sale of vacant government-owned land to private companies, ending the income tax exemption for non-residents working in the District, and layoffs of some of the government's management personnel. He advocated reducing crime through community-oriented policing.

Stallings came in second place in the election, receiving 18 percent of the vote.

In November 1997, Umoja Party co-founder Brian Harris was murdered in an alley behind a church near H Street NE after being robbed of his cash and leather coat.

=== 1998 general election ===
In 1998, Nik Earnes declared his candidacy for the Ward 1 seat on the council, running against incumbent Frank Smith Jr. Earns was an engineering student at Howard University and an Advisory Neighborhood Commissioner for LeDroit Park. Earnes said that the Councilmember representing Ward 1 should be a person of color because African Americans and Latinos are the majority of the residents there.

George Pope ran an at-large seat on the District of Columbia Board of Education, officially nonpartisan on the ballot. Pope stressed parental involvement, leadership, and experience.

Thompson announced that he would run for an at-large seat on the council, trying to unseat incumbents Hilda Mason and David A. Catania. Thompson said he would focus on employment, elder services, education, law enforcement, affordable housing, and health care. He said that economic development was especially needed for Anacostia, U Street, and Barracks Row. Anita Bonds served as the chair of Thompson's campaign.

In July 1998, Thompson's wife testified that Thompson severely beat every week for several months while she was pregnant with their daughter. His wife said, after they separated, Thompson broke into her apartment and beat her in front of their daughter. According to his wife, Thompson claimed to be untouchable because his activism and community connections would make sure no one would believe her if she told anyone about the domestic abuse. His wife filed for divorce and child support. Thompson was convicted of assault and sentenced to two years of probation. He was required to perform 150 hours of community service, attend counselling, and ordered to remain away from his wife. Thompson was convicted of assault. Thomas said he would remain a candidate for Council.

Following the Democratic primary election, Thompson expressed concern at the possibility of the majority of the Council being white. If that were to happen, Thompson said rent control, home rule, and employment would be in serious risk. He later said that white politicians do not generally vote in favor of these issues that are critical to African Americans.

Council Member Marion Barry and former Council Member H. R. Crawford both endorsed Thompson's candidacy in October. The District of Columbia Chamber of Commerce also endorsed Thompson's candidacy.

Thomas' divorce proceedings in October revealed that Thompson was delinquent on paying child support for his five-year-old daughter and did not file income tax returns for the previous six years. His wife said her car had been impounded because of unpaid parking tickets Thomas received while driving her car. She also said he violated the restraining order by calling and harassing her. Thomas declined to comment.

Following reports of Thomas' domestic violence conviction, child support payment delinquency, and non-filing of tax returns, the District of Columbia Chamber of Commerce withdrew its support of Thomas. Thompson declined to drop out of the race, saying he would continue to run as long as his candidacy was "valid and meaningful to the residents of the District of Columbia". Incumbent Councilmember Hilda Mason]said Thomas was unfit for office because of his income tax delinquency.

In September, Thomas pleaded guilty to not paying District taxes and not filing District income tax returns for 1995. In exchange for pleading guilty, prosecutors dropped the charges for 1996 and 1997. Sentencing was scheduled for after the general election.

Thompson received 9,733 votes, and came in fifth place with five percent of the vote, for at-large member of the council. Earnes came in second place, with thirteen percent of the vote, for the Ward 1 seat on the council. Pope came in eighth place, with six percent of the vote, for an at-large seat on the Board of Education.

In December 1999, Thompson received a one-year jail term on the tax charges. The judge suspended the sentence and put Thomas on probation for three years on the condition that Thomas pays four years of back taxes, files and pays all future taxes, and obeys the law.

=== 2000 general election ===
In July 2000, the Umoja Party had one candidate on the ballot, Kalonji T. Olusegun ran for shadow representative. Olusegun was a retired social service administrator who highlighted his advocacy for the poor and disenfranchised as well as his forty years of social activism. He said he would advocate for justice, truth, and democracy.

Thompson said he would not run for office in 2000 because he did not have the energy after his runs for Council in 1994, 1996, and 1998.

The party platform included establishing a living wage, expanding the earned income tax credit, affordable housing, government-subsidized health insurance for all poor children, and preserving the University of the District of Columbia and D.C. General Hospital.

When asked about the possibility that African Americans may no longer hold the majority of the seats on the Board of Education, Marilyn Preston Killingham, deputy chairman of the Umoja Party, said, "The general design for D.C. is one of white takeover. I think that this follows that general design and plan. ... A racist design will lead to a racist conglomeration."

In the general election, Olusegun came in fourth place with 4,032 votes, fewer than the 7,500 needed to retain its major-party status in the District.
