= James E. Nathanson =

American politician (born 1932)

Jim Nathanson

Member of the Council of the District of Columbia from Ward 3
- In office January 2, 1987 – January 2, 1995
- Preceded by: Polly Shackleton
- Succeeded by: Kathleen Patterson

Personal details
- Born: September 26, 1932 (age 94) Boston, Massachusetts, U.S.
- Party: Democratic
- Education: Harvard University (BA); George Washington University (LLB)

James E. "Jim" Nathanson (born September 26, 1932 in Boston) is a former politician and lawyer in Washington, D.C. He was elected to represent Ward 3 on the Council of the District of Columbia in 1987 and served until 1995.

Nathanson was a teacher at Duke Ellington School of the Arts in February 1986 when he announced his run for the Ward 3 council seat of Polly Shackleton, who was not running for reelection. He won the 1986 election and was reelected in 1990, but was defeated in an upset by Kathleen Patterson in the 1994 Democratic primary. Patterson emphasized her commitment to district-wide issues and criticized Nathanson's commitment to fiscal responsibility.
