= Kathleen Patterson =

American politician

Kathy Patterson

Auditor of the District of Columbia
- Incumbent
- Assumed office January 2, 2015
- Mayor: Muriel Bowser
- Preceded by: Yolanda Branche

Member of the Council of the District of Columbia from Ward 3
- In office January 2, 1995 – January 2, 2007
- Preceded by: James E. Nathanson
- Succeeded by: Mary Cheh

Personal details
- Born: June 21, 1948 (age 77) Washington, D.C., U.S.
- Party: Democratic
- Education: Northwestern University (BA); Georgetown University (MA)

Kathleen "Kathy" Patterson (born June 21, 1948) is an American politician from Washington, D.C. From 1995 to 2007, she was a Democratic member of the Council of the District of Columbia, where she served as the elected member for Ward 3, a post now held by Matthew Frumin. In 2014, she returned to government when she was nominated as Auditor of the District of Columbia.

== Early life and education ==
Originally from Chico, California, Patterson came to the District in January 1977 to be a Washington correspondent for The Kansas City Star. Patterson holds a degree in journalism from Northwestern University and a master's degree in English literature from Georgetown University.

== Career in politics ==
Patterson ran for council in 1994, presenting herself as a parent concerned about public education in the District. At the time she was working as communications director for the American Public Welfare Association, a national nonprofit organization that represents state human service agencies and works with Congress and the White House on poverty and children's issues. Her grassroots campaign successfully ousted two-term incumbent James E. Nathanson in the Democratic primary. The voters of Ward 3 returned her to the Council three times, in 2002 with nearly 80 percent of the vote.

On the council, Patterson focused on fiscal responsibility, stronger public schools, and accountability from District government officials. She served as chair of the Committee on Government Operations from 1997 through 2000, the Committee on the Judiciary from January 2001 through 2004, and finally the Committee on Education, Libraries, and Recreation.

Patterson ran for council chairman and was beaten in a landslide by Vincent C. Gray on September 12, 2006. Her election loss was attributed to racial politics by some Patterson supporters, while others felt that her tough-talking style was too abrasive to lead the council. Patterson said afterwards, "I have no apologies, and I have no regrets."

Political offices
Preceded by Yolanda Branche	Auditor of the District of Columbia; 2015–present	Incumbent
