= Frank Smith (D.C. Council) =

American politician and activist (born 1942)

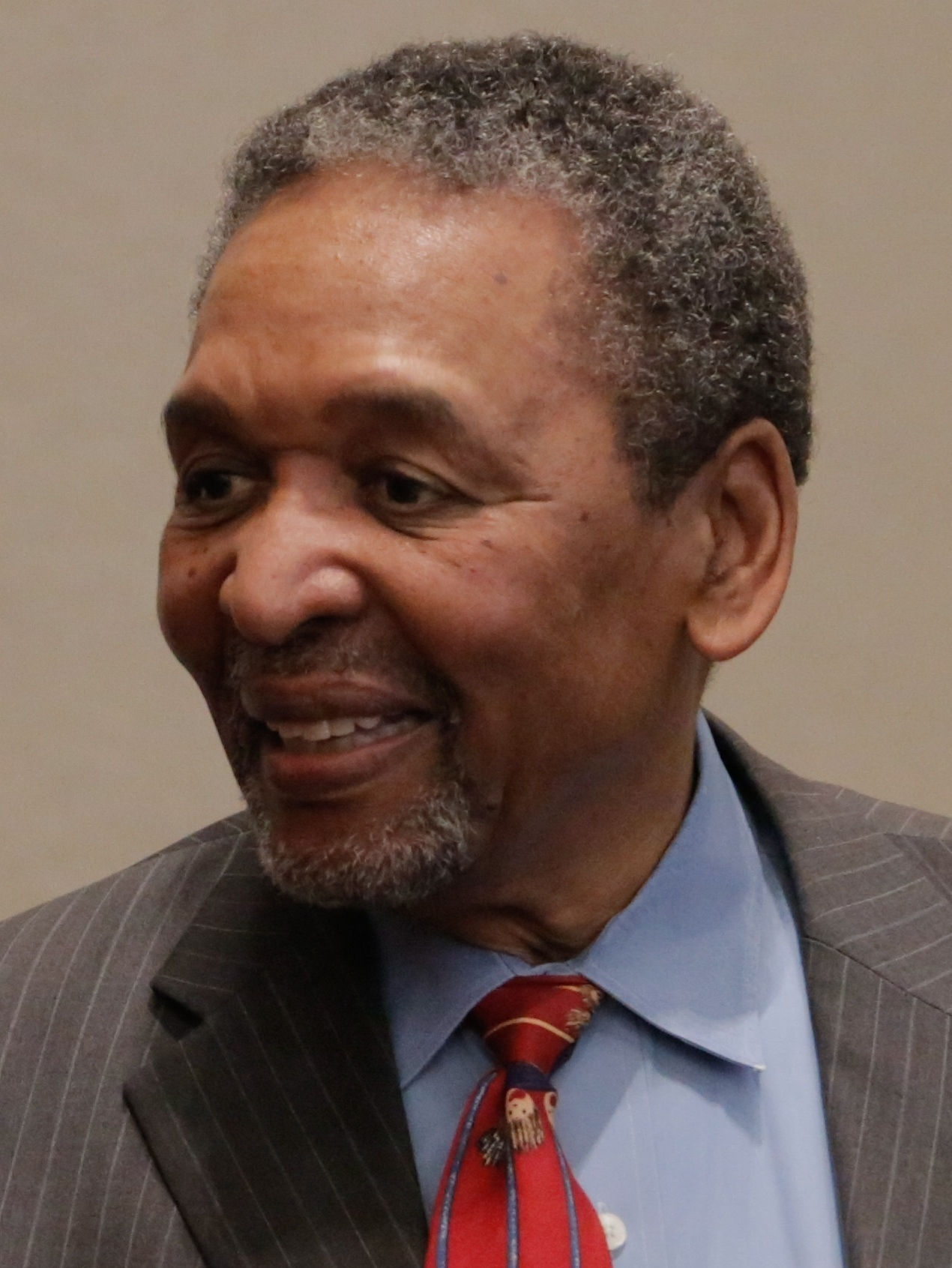
- Smith in 2018

Member of the Council of the District of Columbia from Ward 1
- In office January 2, 1983 – January 2, 1999
- Preceded by: David A. Clarke
- Succeeded by: Jim Graham

Personal details
- Born: September 17, 1942 (age 83) Newnan, Georgia, U.S.
- Education: Morehouse College (attended)

Frank Smith Jr. (born September 17, 1942), is an American civil rights activist and politician in Washington, D.C.

== Early years ==
Born in Newnan, Georgia, in 1942, Smith attended Morehouse College where he developed his appetite for activism.

== Work with Student Nonviolent Coordinating Committee ==
Smith left school to organize the Student Nonviolent Coordinating Committee (SNCC), which used nonviolence to challenge racial segregation. He had initially planned only to leave school until the next quarter started. However, when Emmett Till was murdered, there was a note attached saying that "This is what happens when you civil rights workers come and then leave." This motivated Smith to drop out of school entirely and to stay with the Committee for six years.

In 1960, Smith participated in the Rich's Department Store boycotts in Atlanta. He was the first SNCC worker sent into Mississippi to register voters, and while based in Holly Springs, Mississippi, he worked in some of the state's most brutal and racist counties. He was also one of the few SNCC workers employed in the original Head Start program. Working with the Child Development Group of Mississippi, his program was based in Jackson, Mississippi.

Smith worked with Mississippi sharecroppers who had been evicted from their homes when they requested a pay raise in the men's salaries from a flat rate of $6.00 per day to $1.25 per hour. The sharecroppers, Smith and his first wife, Jean Smith, purchased land, lived in tents where they were regular and ongoing targets for the plantation owner and friends, and established one of the first black cooperative communities in Mississippi—Strike City.

As part of Freedom Summer in 1964, Smith and Frank Soracco, another SNCC worker, traveled the United States to raise funds for travel and expenses for the Mississippi Freedom Democratic Party and for his friend and colleague, Fannie Lou Hamer, to attend the 1964 Democratic National Convention. With the help of Vice President Hubert Humphrey and party leader Walter Mondale, Johnson engineered a compromise in which the Democratic National Committee offered the Mississippi Freedom Party two at-large seats, allowing them to watch the floor proceedings but not take part. The party refused this compromise, which permitted the undemocratic, white-only regulars to keep their seats and denied votes to the Mississippi Freedom Party. While they were unsuccessful at being seated, their presence and Hamer's testimony led to the passage of the Voting Rights Act of 1965.

During the Civil Rights Movement, Smith organized two writers to write The Student Voice (published in Atlanta), which Frank he to as "the movement newspaper." It covered the Atlanta movement and other small towns around the area, and was an important tool for the SNCC community.

Smith also helped integrate schools and helped with transportation to and from school. He helped tutor the children who were going to be integrating the schools when most other activists would not do so due to fear of what might happen to them.

== Political career ==
After leaving Mississippi, Smith relocated to Washington, D.C., where he continued his service to community. He was elected to the D.C. Board of Education in 1979 and subsequently to the Council of the District of Columbia in 1982, where he served for 16 years. His work focused on housing and economic development. While on the Council, he served as chair of the Housing and Economic Development Committee, the Washington Metropolitan Area Transit Authority, and the Baseball Commission. As a council member, he shared his passion for gardening by introducing legislation to maintain the original victory gardens and to allow residents to garden on vacant, District-owned properties. Smith's urban housing activities included setting up the original Neimiah project in the District of Columbia and introducing legislation for urban homesteading. He also served as chair of the District of Columbia Housing Authority. Smith's office records from his time as a District council member are under the care of the Special Collections Research Center at the George Washington University.

== Nonprofit organization leadership ==
After Smith's term on the Council, he focused on his passion, African American history, and found funding to build the African American Civil War Memorial and establish a nonprofit organization that supports the accompanying museum. Smith is a founding executive director and board member of the museum.
