= David Catania =

American politician (born 1968)

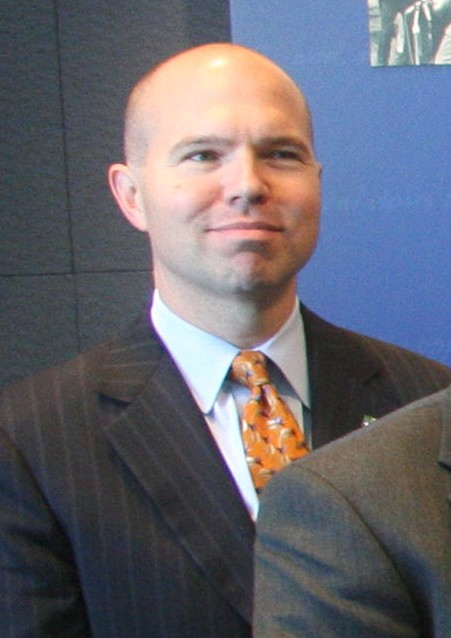

Member of the Council of the District of Columbia from the at-large district
- In office December 15, 1997 – January 2, 2015
- Preceded by: Arrington Dixon
- Succeeded by: Elissa Silverman

Personal details
- Born: January 16, 1968 (age 58) Kansas City, Missouri, U.S.
- Party: Republican (before 2004); Independent (2004–present)
- Spouse: Bill Enright (m. 2017–2021)
- Education: Georgetown University (BS, JD)

David A. Catania (born January 16, 1968) is an American politician and lawyer from Washington, D.C. He was formerly an at-large member of the Council of the District of Columbia, which he gave up to pursue an unsuccessful run in the 2014 mayoral election.

== Early life and education ==
Born in Kansas City, Missouri, Catania is a graduate of Georgetown University's School of Foreign Service and Georgetown University Law Center. He served on the Advisory Neighborhood Commission from Ward 1's 1st district from 1997 to 1999, preceded by Kathleen Early and succeeded by Lance Salonia.

== D.C. Council ==
He was elected to the council as a Republican in a 1997 special election with 7% voter turnout, but elected to a full term in 1998, and re-elected in 2002 and 2006. Catania lives in the Dupont Circle neighborhood.

Catania was the first openly gay member of the D.C. Council and one of a small number of openly gay Republican office-holders. This led to a conflict within his party when President George W. Bush spoke in favor of an amendment to the United States Constitution to ban same-sex marriage. Catania opposed the amendment and became a vocal opponent of Bush's 2004 re-election. In response, the District of Columbia Republican Committee decertified him as a delegate to the 2004 Republican National Convention. Catania announced his endorsement of the Democratic presidential candidate, John Kerry, one week prior to the convention. In September 2004, Catania left the party and became an independent, citing his displeasure with its direction on urban and social issues. He was re-elected in 2006 and 2010 as an independent.

Catania was most recently the chairperson of the council's Committee on Education and was a member of the Committee on Government Operations, the Committee on Finance and Revenue, and the Committee on Health. Catania chaired the Committee on Health between 2005 and 2012. As one of two openly gay members then serving on the council, Catania played a major role in the city's recognition of same-sex unions and legalization of same-sex marriage.

=== Positions ===
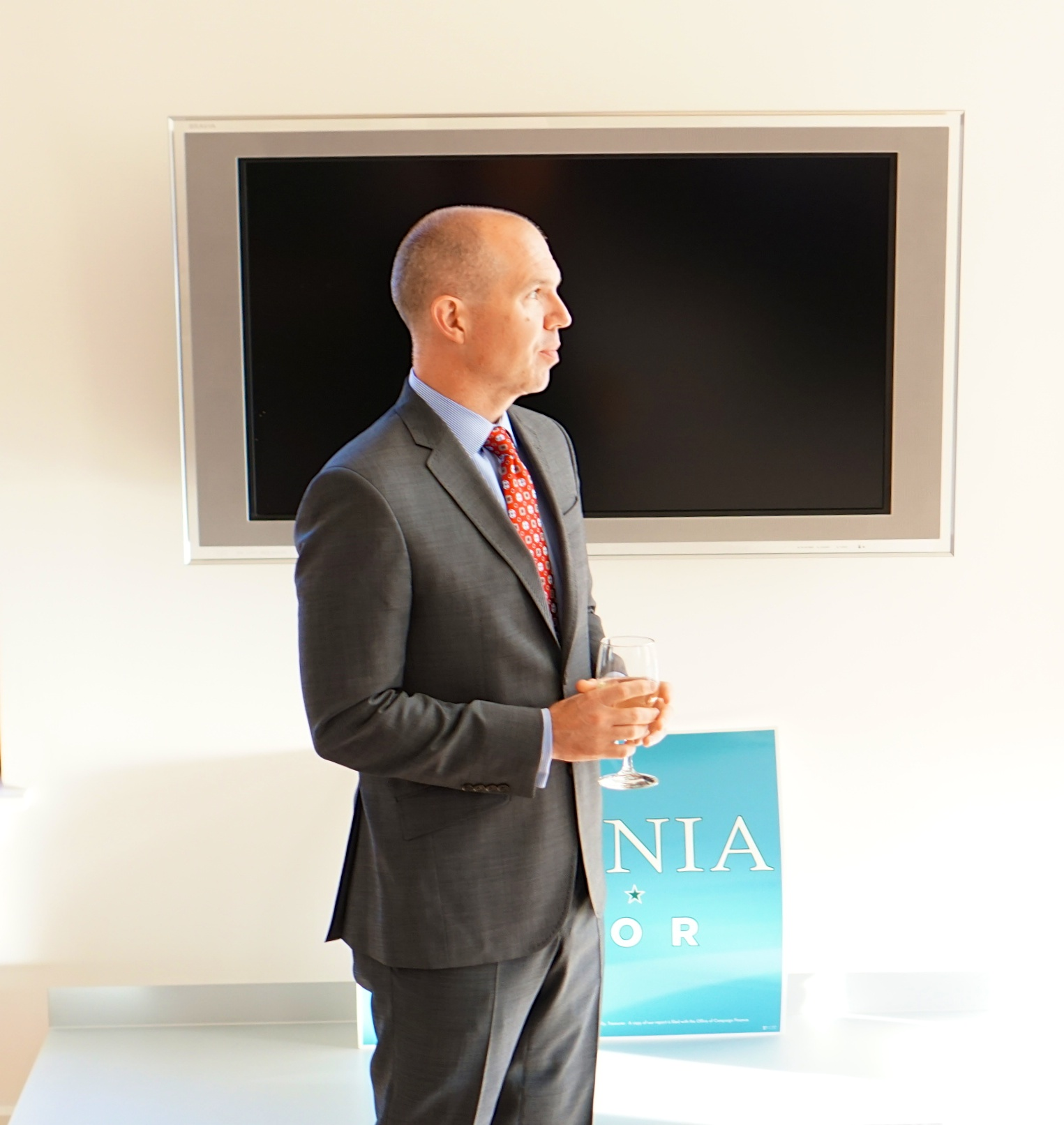
Catania speaking at an event for his 2014 mayoral campaign

Catania opposed terms limits for elected officials. In 2001, Catania voted in favor of legislation that overturned the results of a popular referendum limiting members of the D.C. Council to two terms.

== Post-Council career ==
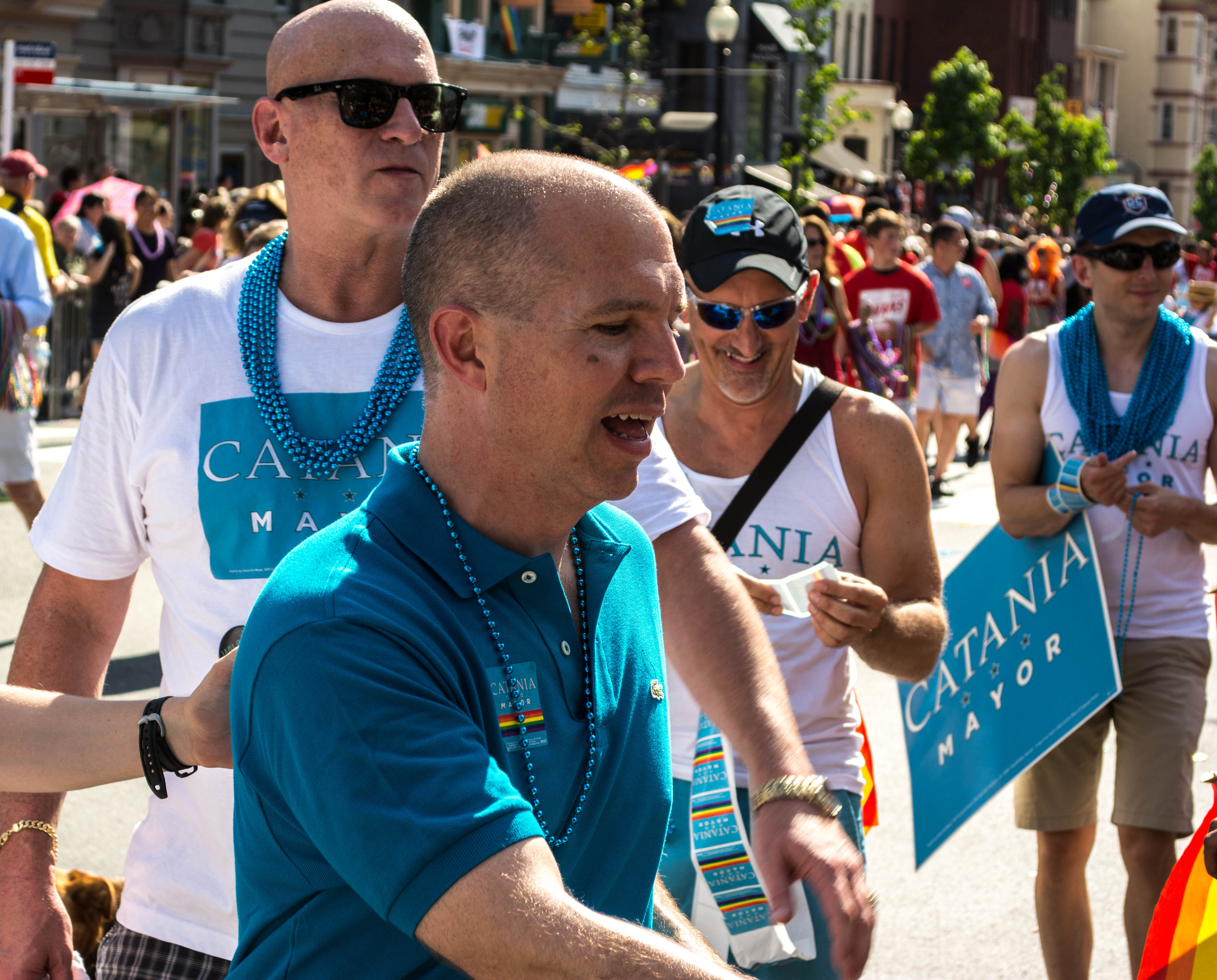
DC Capital Pride Parade, 2014

In 2014, Catania was unsuccessful in a bid for mayor of Washington, D.C. In 2015, he joined the international law firm Greenberg Traurig, where he focuses his practice on healthcare, government law and strategy, and public policy.

In 2018, he served as the U.S. Head of Public Affairs for Starship Technologies, a robotic delivery company. In February, Catania opened a District-based lobbying firm with Benjamin Young, his former chief of staff and campaign manager.

In 2018, Catania was campaign co-chair for S. Kathryn Allen, a former insurance executive who sought Catania's former seat on the council, held by Elissa Silverman. An investigation determined that more than half of Allen's signatures were fraudulently collected and her name was not included on the ballot.

== Personal life ==
Catania married floral designer Bill Enright on August 5, 2017, in a ceremony officiated by his former Council colleague Mary Cheh. Catania and Enright finalized their divorce on July 21, 2021.
