= Advisory neighborhood commission =

Local government bodies in Washington, D.C., United States

Advisory Neighborhood Commission
Agency overview
- Formed: 1974
- Jurisdiction: District of Columbia, United States
- Headquarters: John A. Wilson Building, Washington DC
- Parent agency: Council of the District of Columbia
- Website: anc.dc.gov

Advisory neighborhood commissions (ANCs) are bodies of local government in the District of Columbia, in the United States. The ANC system was created in 1974 through a referendum (73 percent voted "yes") in the District of Columbia Home Rule Act. The first elections for Advisory Neighborhood Commissioners were held in the fall of 1975, and commissions began operating in 1976. Congressman Don Fraser (D-Minn) and D.C. resident Milton Kotler helped to draft the ANC language in the Home Rule Act based on the success of Adams Morgan Organization (AMO) in Adams Morgan and on a 1970 report of the Minneapolis Citizen League, as well as on related neighborhood corporations in Pittsburgh; Brooklyn, New York; Chicago; and Columbus, Ohio.

ANCs consider a wide range of policies and programs affecting their neighborhoods, including traffic, parking, recreation, street improvements, liquor licenses, zoning, economic development, police protection, sanitation and trash collection, and the district's annual budget. Commissioners serve two-year terms and receive no salary, but commissions do receive funds for the general purpose of improving their area and hiring staff. This policy has come under scrutiny because of the misuse of funds by commissioners and their employees. Candidates can accept campaign donations up to $25 per person.

As of 2023, ANCs represent more than 100 neighborhoods.

== Powers ==
The powers of the ANC system are enumerated by the DC Code § 1–207.38:

1. May advise the District government on matters of public policy including decisions regarding planning, streets, recreation, social services programs, health, safety, and sanitation in that neighborhood commission area;
2. May employ staff and expend, for public purposes within its neighborhood commission area, public funds and other funds donated to it; and
3. Shall have such other powers and duties as may be provided by act of the council.

The ANCs present their positions and recommendations on issues to various District government agencies, the Executive Branch, and the council. They also present testimony to independent agencies, boards, and commissions, usually under the rules of procedure specific to those entities. By law, the ANCs may present their positions to Federal agencies. One of the most common cases of ANC involvement is in the giving of liquor licenses, where the approval or disapproval of the commission, despite having no legal power, represents a veto to the district government.

== Membership and qualifications ==
Each ANC Commissioner is nominated and elected by the registered voters who reside in the same Single Member District as the candidate. The ANC Commissioner is an official representing her or his neighborhood community (Single Member District) on the Advisory Neighborhood Commission.

In order to hold the office of advisory neighborhood commissioner, an individual must be a registered voter (or must be able to register to vote within two years) in the District, as defined by DC Code Section 1-1001.02; have resided continuously in the Single Member District from which they are nominated for the 60-day period immediately preceding the day on which the nominating petition is filed; and hold no other public office. In order to enter the public ballot, they must receive 25 signatures from registered voters in their district.

== Single Member Districts ==
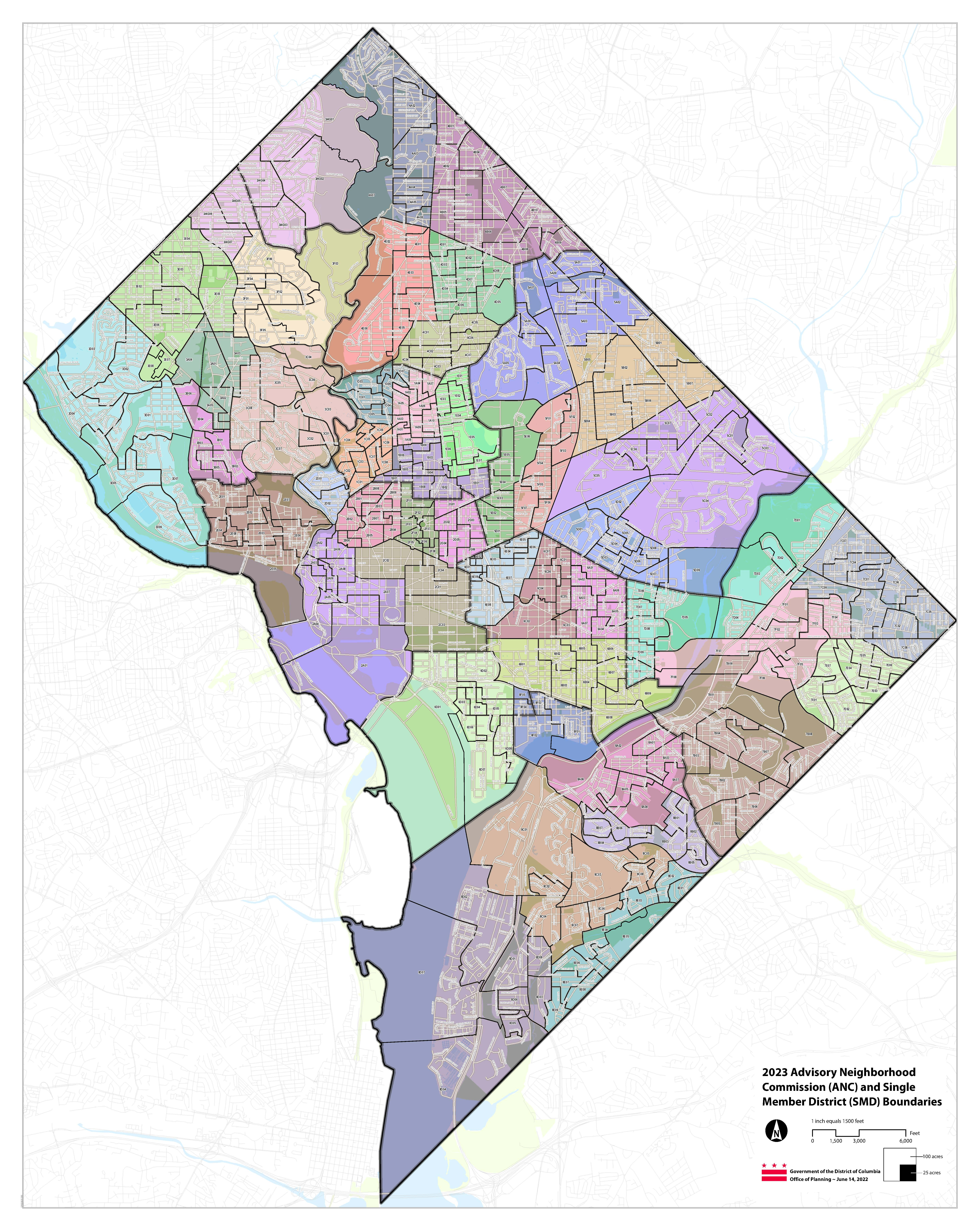
The District of Columbia is divided into 8 wards, each of which is further divided into local ANCs.

The District of Columbia is divided into eight wards, each of which elects a representative to the Council of the District of Columbia.

Each ward is further subdivided into smaller areas known as advisory neighborhood commissions (ANCs). Within each ANC, there are even smaller areas called Single Member Districts (SMDs), each typically representing about 2,000 residents. Although the SMDs should have equal populations, ANCs may vary widely in size. The largest ANCs have 10 SMDs while the smallest just have two.

Following population growth indicated by the 2020 census, the District now has 46 ANCs, consisting of 345 SMDs.

Each ANC is named by its ward number followed by a letter, assigned alphabetically starting with 'A'. For example, ANC 3B refers to the second ANC in Ward 3.

Each SMD is named by its ANC number followed by a two-digit number starting with '01'. For example, SMD 3B05 is the fifth single member district within ANC 3B.

Due to population growth and redistricting, these boundaries often change, causing shifts in power and election turnout.

=== Ward 1 ===
- 1A - Columbia Heights
- 1B - LeDroit Park, U Street, and northern Shaw
- 1C - Adams Morgan, Kalorama Heights, and Lanier Heights
- 1D - Mount Pleasant
- 1E - Park View, Pleasant Plains, and Howard University

=== Ward 2 ===
- 2A - Foggy Bottom, West End
- 2B - Dupont Circle
- 2C - Chinatown, Penn Quarter
- 2D - Kalorama, Sheridan
- 2E - Burleith, Georgetown, Hillandale
- 2F - Logan Circle

=== Ward 3 ===
- 3B - Cathedral Heights, Glover Park
- 3C - Cathedral Heights, Cleveland Park, Massachusetts Heights, McLean Gardens, Woodley Park
- 3D - American University, Foxhall, Kent, The Palisades, Spring Valley, Wesley Heights
- 3E - American University Park, Friendship Heights, Tenleytown, Wakefield, Chevy Chase, Ft Gaines
- 3F - Forest Hills, North Cleveland Park, Tenleytown, Wakefield
- 3/4G - Chevy Chase

=== Ward 4 ===
- 4A - Brightwood, Colonial Village, Crestwood, Shepherd Park, Sixteenth Street Heights
- 4B - Brightwood, Riggs Park, Manor Park, Riggs Park, South Manor Park, Takoma, Fort Stevens Ridge
- 4C - Columbia Heights, Petworth, Sixteenth Street Heights
- 4D - Petworth, Brightwood Park

=== Ward 5 ===
- 5A - North Michigan Park, Michigan Park, Fort Totten, Pleasant Hills, Fort Totten Park, parts of Catholic University and other Catholic Institutions, parts of Riggs Park
- 5B - Brookland, University Heights, parts of Woodridge, parts of Queens Chapel, parts of Michigan Park
- 5C - Langdon, Fort Lincoln, Brentwood, Arboretum, Northeast, Mt. Olivet Cemetery
- 5D - Carver Langston, Trinidad, Gallaudet University, Ivy City, Capital City Market
- 5E - Bloomingdale, Stronghold, parts of Truxton Circle, parts of Edgewood, Washington Hospital Center, Glenwood/St. Mary's Cemeteries, McMillan Sand Filtration Site
- 5F - Eckington, parts of Edgewood, parts of Truxton Circle

=== Ward 6 ===
- 6A - North Lincoln Park, Rosedale, H St. corridor (eastern half)
- 6B - Barney Circle, Capitol Hill (southern half), Eastern Market
- 6C - Near Northeast, NoMa, Union Station, H St. corridor (western half)
- 6D - Carrollsburg, Fort McNair, Navy Yard, Near Southwest/Southeast, Waterfront
- 6E - Shaw, Northwest One, and Mount Vernon Triangle

=== Ward 7 ===
- 7B - Dupont Park, Fairfax Village, Greenway (part), Hillcrest, Naylor Gardens, Penn Branch, Randle Highlands, Twining
- 7C - Benning Heights, Burrville, Deanwood, Grant Park, Lincoln Heights
- 7D - Eastland Gardens, Kenilworth, Kingman Park, Mayfair, River Terrace
- 7E - Benning Ridge (part), Capitol View, Fort Davis, Marshall Heights
- 7F - Benning Ridge (part), Fort Dupont, Greenway (part), Hill East (part, including D.C. Jail)

=== Ward 8 ===
- 8A - Anacostia, Fairlawn, Fort Stanton, Hillsdale
- 8B - Garfield Heights, Knox Hill, Shipley Terrace
- 8C - Barry Farm, Bolling Air Force Base, Congress Heights, St. Elizabeths Hospital
- 8D - Bellevue, Far Southwest
- 8E - Congress Heights, Valley Green, Washington Highlands

== See also ==
- Neighborhoods in Washington, D.C.
