= Outline of Washington, D.C. =

Capital city of the United States

The Flag of the District of Columbia

The Great Seal of the District of Columbia

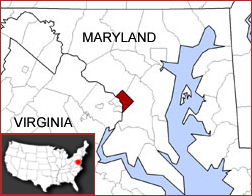
The location of the District of Columbia in the United States of America

The following outline is provided as an overview of and topical guide to the District of Columbia:

Washington, D.C., legally named the District of Columbia, in the United States of America, was founded on July 16, 1790, after the inauguration of City of Washington, the new capital of the country. The area given to District of Columbia, was originally 100 square miles (259 km^{2}) ceded by the states of Maryland and Virginia in accordance with the Residence Act; however, in 1846, the retrocession of the District of Columbia, meant that the area of 31 square miles (80 km^{2}) which was ceded by Virginia was returned, leaving 69 square miles (179 km^{2}) of territory originally ceded by Maryland as the current area of the District in its entirety.

The City of Washington was originally a separate municipality within the Territory of Columbia until the District of Columbia Organic Act of 1871 effectively merged the City and the Territory into a single entity. It is for this reason that everything within its boundaries is legally the District of Columbia.

== General reference ==
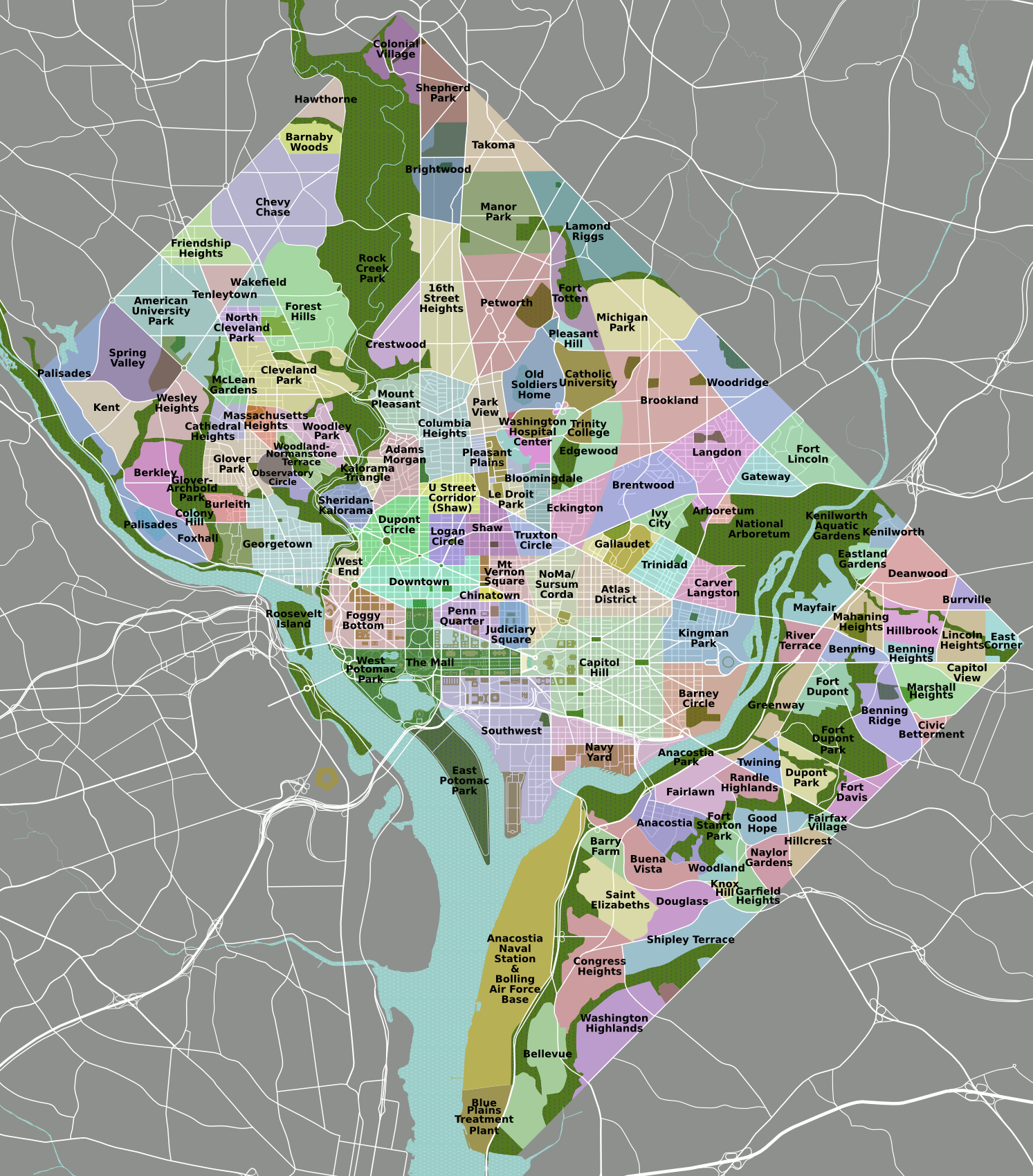
An enlargeable map of the United States District of Columbia

- Names
  - Common name: Washington, D.C.
  - Official name: District of Columbia
  - Abbreviations and name codes
    - Postal symbol: DC
    - ISO 3166-2 code: US-DC
    - Internet second-level domain: .dc.us
- Adjectivals:
  - District of Columbia
  - District
  - DC
- Demonym: Washingtonian

== Geography of Washington, D.C. ==
- The District of Columbia is: The federal capital district of the United States of America
- Location
  - Northern Hemisphere
  - Western Hemisphere
    - Americas
      - North America
        - Anglo America
        - Northern America
          - United States of America
            - Contiguous United States
              - Eastern United States
                - East Coast of the United States – even though the District of Columbia does not include any coastline, it is generally considered to be part of the Eastern Seaboard region.
                  - Northeast megalopolis
                - Mid-Atlantic states
- Population of Washington, D.C.: 689,545 (2020 U.S. Census)
- Area of Washington, D.C.: 63.8 mi sq

=== Geographic features of Washington, D.C. ===
- Atlantic coastal plain
- Atlantic Seaboard fall line
- Boundary Channel
- Buzzard Point
- Capitol Hill
- Columbia Island
- Georgetown Reservoir
- Hains Point
- Dalecarlia Reservoir
- McMillan Reservoir
- Meridian Hill
- Piedmont (United States)
- Southwest Waterfront
- Theodore Roosevelt Island
- Rivers of Washington, D.C.
- Three Sisters
- Tidal Basin
- Washington Channel

=== Places in Washington, D.C. ===
- Historic places in Washington, D.C.
  - Boundary Markers of the Original District of Columbia
  - Chesapeake and Ohio Canal
  - Jefferson Pier
  - National Historic Landmarks in Washington, D.C.
  - National Register of Historic Places listings in Washington, D.C.
    - Bridges on the National Register of Historic Places in Washington, D.C.
    - National Register of Historic Places listings in Northeast Quadrant, Washington, D.C.
    - National Register of Historic Places listings in Southeast Quadrant, Washington, D.C.
    - National Register of Historic Places listings in Southwest Quadrant, Washington, D.C.
    - National Register of Historic Places listings in Northwest Quadrant, Washington, D.C.
  - National Monuments in Washington, D.C.
    - President Lincoln's Cottage at the Soldiers' Home
- National Natural Landmarks in Washington, D.C.: none
- Bridges in Washington, D.C.
  - 11th Street Bridges
  - 14th Street Bridges
  - Arlington Memorial Bridge
  - Boulder Bridge
  - Boundary Channel Bridge
  - Chain Bridge
  - Connecticut Avenue Bridge (Klingle Valley Bridge)
  - Dunbarton Bridge
  - Francis Scott Key Bridge
  - Frederick Douglass Memorial Bridge
  - Kutz Memorial Bridge
  - New York Avenue Bridge
  - Theodore Roosevelt Bridge
  - Pennsylvania Avenue Bridge
  - Ross Drive Bridge
  - William Howard Taft Bridge
  - Woodrow Wilson Memorial Bridge
- Neighborhoods in Washington, D.C.
- National Parks in Washington, D.C. (official units of the U.S. National Park System)
  - Benjamin Banneker Park
  - Carter G. Woodson Home National Historic Site
  - Battleground National Cemetery
  - Clara Barton Parkway
  - Constitution Gardens
  - East Potomac Park
  - Ford's Theatre National Historic Site
  - Fort Circle Parks
  - Franklin D. Roosevelt Memorial
  - Frederick Douglass National Historic Site
  - Freedom Plaza
  - Korean War Veterans Memorial
  - Lincoln Memorial
  - Lyndon Baines Johnson Memorial Grove on the Potomac
  - Mary McLeod Bethune Council House National Historic Site
  - National Capital Parks
    - Chesapeake and Ohio Canal National Historical Park
    - George Washington Memorial Parkway
    - National Capital Parks-East
    - National Mall and Memorial Parks
      - National Mall
    - President's Park
      - Lafayette Square
      - The Ellipse
      - White House
    - Rock Creek Park
  - Jefferson Memorial
  - Pennsylvania Avenue National Historic Site
  - Theodore Roosevelt Island
  - Vietnam Veterans Memorial
  - Washington Monument
  - West Potomac Park
  - World War II Memorial
- United States Capitol Complex
  - Union Square
    - Capitol Reflecting Pool
    - Ulysses S. Grant Memorial
  - United States Botanic Garden
  - United States Capitol
    - Apotheosis of Democracy
    - Hall of Columns
    - National Statuary Hall
    - National Statuary Hall Collection
    - Old Senate Chamber
    - Old Supreme Court Chamber
    - Statue of Freedom
    - United States Capitol crypt
    - United States Capitol dome
    - United States Capitol rotunda
    - United States Senate chamber
    - Washington's Tomb (United States Capitol)
  - United States Capitol Visitor Center
  - United States National Arboretum
- Washington Aqueduct

=== Environment of Washington, D.C. ===
- Climate of Washington, D.C.
  - Hurricanes in Washington, D.C.
  - Tornados in Washington, D.C.
- Superfund sites in Washington, D.C.

=== Subdivisions of Washington, D.C. ===
- District of Columbia's at-large congressional district
- District of Columbia census statistical areas

==== Quadrants of Washington, D.C. ====
- Northwest, Washington, D.C.
- Northeast, Washington, D.C.
- Southeast, Washington, D.C.
- Southwest, Washington, D.C.

==== Neighborhoods of Washington, D.C. ====
The District of Columbia is divided into eight wards and 37 Advisory Neighborhood Commissions (ANCs) within these wards.

===== Ward 1 =====
Adams Morgan • Columbia Heights • Kalorama • LeDroit Park • Mount Pleasant • Park View • Pleasant Plains • Shaw

===== Ward 2 =====
Burleith • Downtown • Dupont Circle • Foggy Bottom • Georgetown • Sheridan Kalorama • Logan Circle • Mount Vernon Square • Shaw • West End

===== Ward 3 =====
American University Park • Berkley • Cathedral Heights • Chevy Chase • Cleveland Park • Colony Hill • Forest Hills • Foxhall • Friendship Heights • Glover Park • Kent • Massachusetts Heights • McLean Gardens • North Cleveland Park • Observatory Circle • The Palisades • Potomac Heights • Spring Valley • Tenleytown • Wakefield • Wesley Heights • Woodland-Normanstone Terrace • Woodley Park (Part of the neighborhood is also in Ward 1)

===== Ward 4 =====
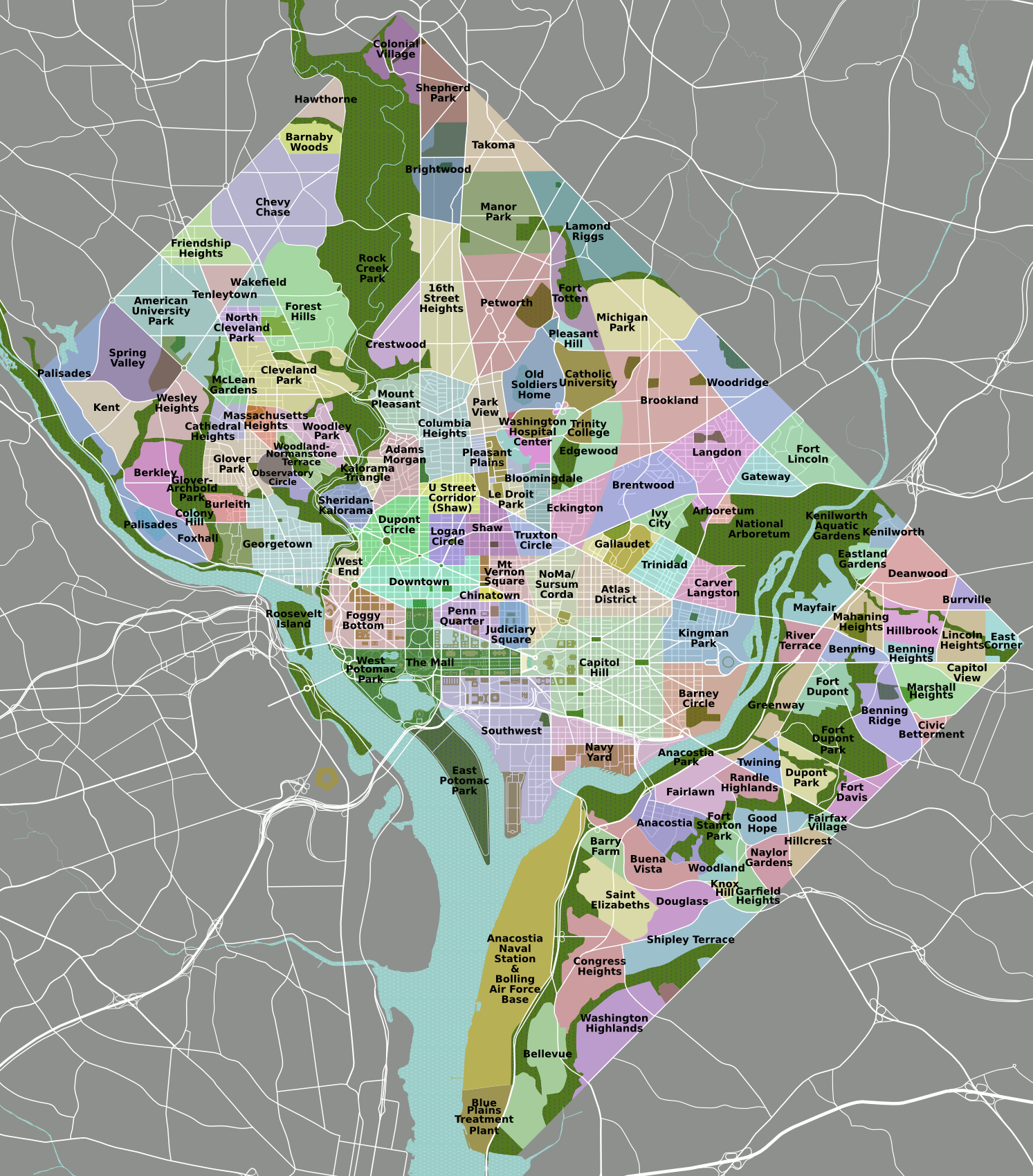
DC neighborhoods map

Barnaby Woods • Brightwood • Brightwood Park • Chevy Chase (Part of the neighborhood is also in Ward 3) • Colonial Village • Crestwood • Fort Totten • Hawthorne • Manor Park • Petworth • Riggs Park • Lamond-Riggs • Shepherd Park • Sixteenth Street Heights • Takoma

===== Ward 5 =====
Arboretum • Bloomingdale • Brentwood • Brookland • Carver Langston • Eckington • Edgewood • Fort Lincoln • Fort Totten (Part of the neighborhood is also in Ward 4) • Gateway • Ivy City • Riggs Park (Part of the neighborhood is also in Ward 4) • Langdon • Michigan Park • North Michigan Park • Pleasant Hill • Stronghold/Metropolis View • Trinidad • Truxton Circle • Woodridge

===== Ward 6 =====
Barney Circle • Capitol Hill • Chinatown • Judiciary Square • Kingman Park • Navy Yard/Near Southeast • Near Northeast • Penn Quarter • NoMa, Washington, D.C. • Southwest Federal Center • Southwest Waterfront • Sursum Corda • Swampoodle • Union Station

===== Ward 7 =====
Benning Heights • Benning Ridge • Benning • Burrville • Capitol View • Civic Betterment • Deanwood • Dupont Park • Eastland Gardens • Fairfax Village • Fairlawn • Fort Davis • Fort Dupont • Good Hope • Grant Park • Greenway • Hillbrook • Hillcrest • Kenilworth • Kingman Park • Lincoln Heights • Mahaning Heights • Marshall Heights • Mayfair • Naylor Gardens • Penn Branch • Randle Highlands • River Terrace • Skyland • Summit Park • Twining

===== Ward 8 =====
Anacostia • Barry Farm • Bellevue • Buena Vista • Congress Heights • Douglass • Fairlawn • Garfield Heights • Knox Hill • Shipley Terrace • Washington Highlands • Woodland

=== Demography of Washington, D.C. ===
- Political party strength in Washington, D.C.

== Government and politics of Washington, D.C. ==
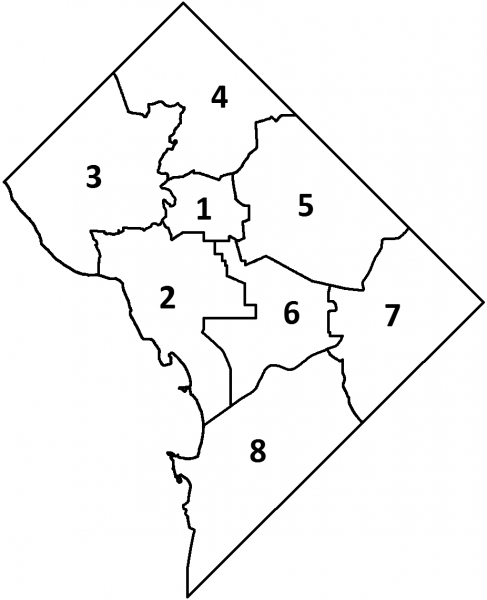
The District of Columbia is divided into 8 wards to elect councilmembers.

- Elections in the District of Columbia
- List of District of Columbia symbols

=== Structure of the government of Washington, D.C. ===
- District of Columbia home rule
  - There are two committees in the United States Congress that oversee the District of Columbia:
    - The United States House Committee on Oversight and Government Reform,
      which is the successor committee to the United States House Committee on the District of Columbia, and
    - The United States Senate Committee on Homeland Security and Governmental Affairs
- District of Columbia's at-large congressional district (one non-voting delegate)

==== Branches of the government of Washington, D.C. ====
===== Executive branch of the government of Washington, D.C. =====
- Mayor of Washington, D.C.
  - Advisory Neighborhood Commissions

===== Legislative branch of the government of Washington, D.C. =====
- Council of the District of Columbia

===== Judicial branch of the government of Washington, D.C. =====
- District of Columbia Court of Appeals (equivalent to a state supreme court)
  - Superior Court of the District of Columbia

=== Law and order in Washington, D.C. ===
- Cannabis in Washington, D.C.
- Crime in Washington, D.C.
- Gun laws in Washington, D.C.
- Law enforcement in Washington, D.C.
  - Metropolitan Police Department of the District of Columbia
- Recognition of same-sex unions in the District of Columbia
- Voting rights in the District of Columbia

=== Military in Washington, D.C. ===
- District of Columbia National Guard
- Military District of Washington
- Joint Force Headquarters National Capital Region

== History of Washington, D.C. ==
- L'Enfant Plan
- District of Columbia retrocession
- Residence Act

=== History of the District of Columbia, by period ===
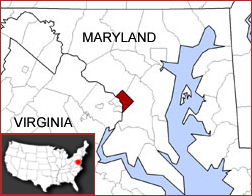
The location of the District of Columbia in the United States of America

- Indigenous peoples
- American Revolutionary War, April 19, 1775 – September 3, 1783
  - United States Declaration of Independence, July 4, 1776
  - Treaty of Paris, September 3, 1783
- State of Maryland, (1776–1791)
- Commonwealth of Virginia, (1776–1791)
- District of Columbia since March 3, 1791
  - President George Washington signs An Act for establishing the temporary and permanent seat of the Government of the United States on July 16, 1790
  - President George Washington proclaims location of the district for the permanent seat of the Government of the United States on January 24, 1791
  - President George Washington signs An Act to amend "An Act for establishing the temporary and permanent seat of the Government of the United States" on March 3, 1791
  - President John Adams moves into new White House on November 1, 1800
  - Sixth United States Congress meets in new United States Capitol on November 17, 1800
  - War of 1812, June 18, 1812 – March 23, 1815
    - Burning of Washington, August 24–25, 1814
    - Treaty of Ghent, December 24, 1814
  - Mexican–American War, April 25, 1846 – February 2, 1848
  - Retrocession of the District of Columbia, 1847
  - Know-Nothing Riot, 1857
  - American Civil War, April 12, 1861 – May 13, 1865
    - District of Columbia in the American Civil War
    - Assassination of President Abraham Lincoln on April 14, 1865
      - President Lincoln dies on April 15, 1865
  - Streetcars in the District of Columbia, 1862–1962
  - Assassination of President James A. Garfield on July 2, 1881
    - President Garfield dies on September 19, 1881
  - Protest marches on Washington, D.C. since 1894
  - McMillan Plan, 1901
  - United States Capitol shooting incident on March 1, 1954
  - Civil Rights Movement from December 1, 1955, to January 20, 1969
    - March on Washington for Jobs and Freedom on August 28, 1963
      - Martin Luther King Jr. delivers his I Have a Dream speech
    - President Lyndon Johnson signs the National Voting Rights Act on August 6, 1965
  - Twenty-third Amendment to the United States Constitution, 1960–1961
  - District of Columbia riots of 1968
  - District of Columbia Home Rule Act of 1973
  - United States Senate bombing of 1983
  - United States Capitol shooting incident of 1998
  - Attacks on the United States, including the Pentagon, on September 11, 2001

== Culture of Washington, D.C. ==
- Architecture of Washington, D.C.
  - Tallest buildings in Washington, D.C.
- Museums in Washington, D.C.
- People from Washington, D.C.
- Scouting in Washington, D.C.
- Symbols of the District of Columbia
  - Flag of the District of Columbia (Washington, D.C.)
  - Great Seal of the District of Columbia

=== The Arts in Washington, D.C. ===
- Music of Washington, D.C.
- Outdoor sculpture in Washington, D.C.
- Theater in Washington, D.C.

== Economy and infrastructure of Washington, D.C. ==
- Communications in Washington, D.C.
  - District of Columbia Public Library
  - Media in Washington, D.C.
    - Newspapers in Washington, D.C.
    - Radio stations in Washington, D.C.
    - Television stations in Washington, D.C.
  - Telephone service in Washington, D.C.
    - Area code 202
- Healthcare in Washington, D.C.
  - Hospitals in Washington, D.C.
- Transportation in Washington, D.C.
  - Metrobus
    - Metrobus routes in Washington, D.C.
  - Airports in Washington, D.C.: none
  - Rail transport in Washington, D.C.
    - Railroads in Washington, D.C.
    - Washington Metro
    - Baltimore-Washington D.C. Maglev (proposed project)
  - Roads in Washington, D.C.
    - Circles in Washington, D.C.
    - Washington, D.C. numbered highways
- Water in Washington, D.C.
  - Washington Aqueduct
  - District of Columbia Water and Sewer Authority
  - Lead contamination in Washington, D.C. drinking water

== Education in Washington, D.C. ==
- Schools in Washington, D.C.
  - District of Columbia Public Schools
    - High schools in Washington, D.C.
  - Colleges and universities in Washington, D.C.

== See also ==
- Topic overview:
  - Washington, D.C.
  - Index of Washington, D.C.-related articles
