= Quadrants of Washington, D.C. =

Geographical quadrant

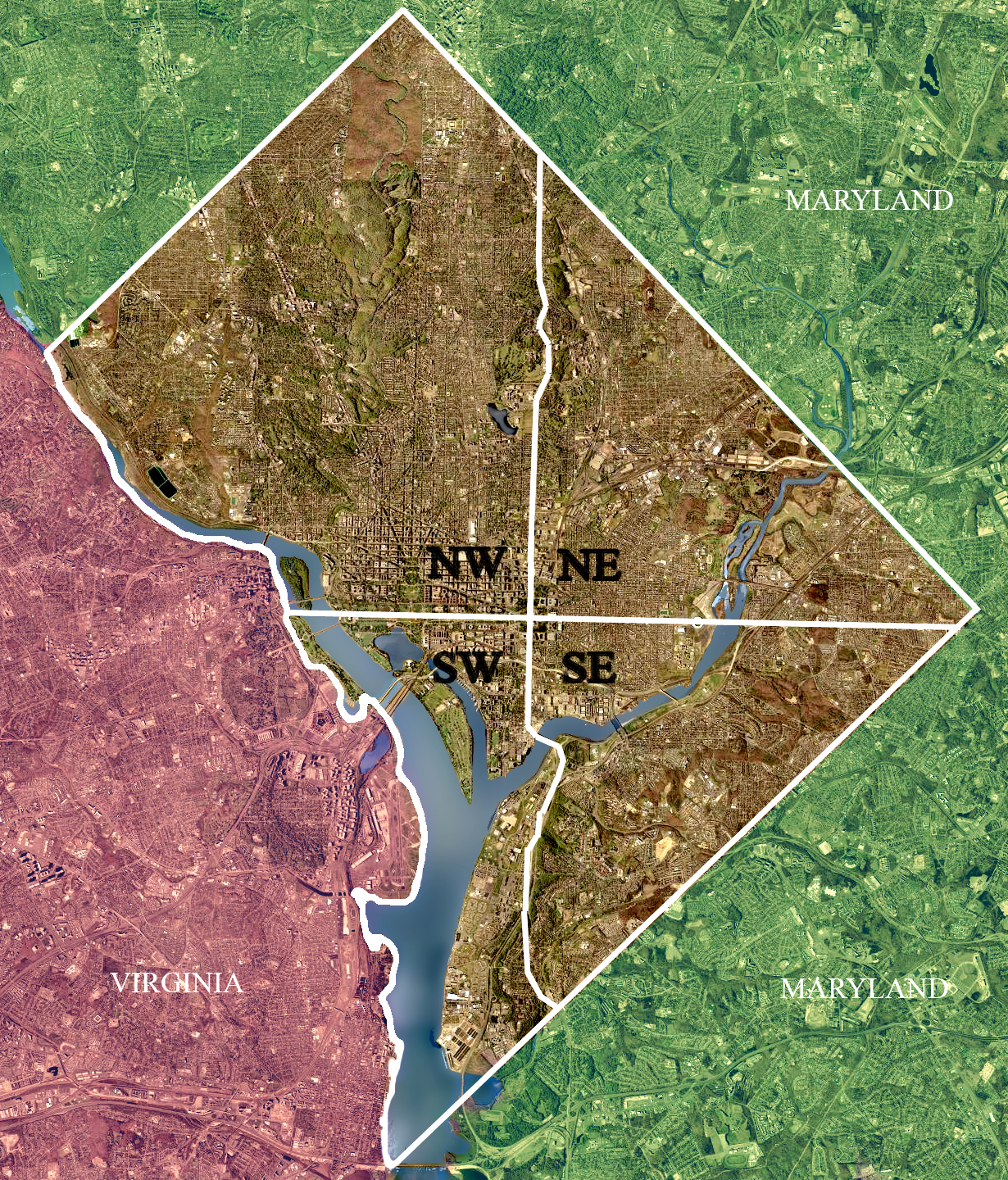
Color-enhanced USGS satellite image of Washington, D.C., taken April 26, 2002. The "crosshairs" in the image mark the quadrant divisions of Washington, with the United States Capitol at the center of the dividing lines. To the west of the Capitol extends the National Mall, visible as a slight green band in the image. The Northwest quadrant is the largest, located north of the Mall and west of North Capitol Street.

Washington, D.C., is administratively divided into four geographical quadrants of unequal size, each delineated by their ordinal directions from the medallion located in the Crypt under the Rotunda of the Capitol. Street and number addressing, centered on the Capitol, radiates out into each of the quadrants, producing a number of intersections of identically named cross-streets in each quadrant. Originally, the District of Columbia was a near-perfect square but contained more than one settlement; the Capitol was to be the center of the City of Washington. Thus, the Capitol was never located at the geographic center of the whole territory, which was eventually north of the Potomac River, consolidated into one city. (The geographic center was located near the onetime marshy area of the present-day intersection of 17th Street, NW and Constitution Ave.) As a result, the quadrants are of greatly varying size. Northwest is quite large, encompassing over a third of the city's geographical area, while Southwest is little more than a few neighborhoods, large parks, and a military base.

The boundaries of the quadrants are not necessarily straight lines radiating from the medallion, but in three instances follow the paths of the boundary streets (which in some cases curve around topographical features): North Capitol Street, South Capitol Street, and East Capitol Street. The axis of the National Mall through the Washington Monument and the Lincoln Memorial forms the boundary running west of the medallion.

== Northwest ==
"Northwest" (also written as NW or N.W.) is located north of the National Mall and west of North Capitol Street. It is the largest of the four quadrants of the city, containing more than 42% of the entire city's area and over half of its population. It includes the central business district, Federal Triangle, the Smithsonian National Zoo, and the museums along the northern side of the National Mall, as well as such prestigious neighborhoods as Foggy Bottom, West End, Columbia Heights, Petworth, Dupont Circle, Logan Circle, LeDroit Park, Georgetown, Adams Morgan, Embassy Row, Glover Park, Tenleytown, Piney Branch, Shepherd Park, Crestwood, Bloomingdale, and Friendship Heights. The large Rock Creek Park divides the northwest quadrant in two.

== Northeast ==
"Northeast" (NE or N.E.) is located north of East Capitol Street and east of North Capitol Street. Northeast neighborhoods include Brentwood, Brookland, Ivy City, Marshall Heights, NoMa, Pleasant Hill, Stanton Park, Trinidad, Michigan Park, Riggs Park, Fort Totten, Fort Lincoln, Edgewood, and Woodridge, as well as much of Capitol Hill. Notable landmarks include the Supreme Court, Union Station, the Catholic University of America, Trinity University, National Shrine of the Immaculate Conception, Franciscan Monastery, Providence Hospital, Gallaudet University, the National Arboretum, Kenilworth Aquatic Gardens, and the Benning Road Power Plant.

== Southeast ==
"Southeast" (SE or S.E.) is located south of East Capitol Street and east of South Capitol Street. It has a rich cultural history, including the historic Capitol Hill and Anacostia neighborhoods, the Hill East neighborhood, the Navy Yard, the Marine Barracks, the Anacostia River waterfront, historic Eastern Market, the remains of several Civil War-era forts, historic St. Elizabeths Hospital, RFK Stadium, Nationals Park, and the Congressional Cemetery. The quadrant is divided by the Anacostia River, with the portion that is west of the river sometimes referred to as "Near Southeast" and the portion east of the river is known as "River East." Many people mistakenly (or in some instances, pejoratively) call the entire eastern portion of the quadrant Anacostia, although the name refers only to a small area along Martin Luther King Jr. Avenue.

== Southwest ==
"Southwest" (SW or S.W.) is located south of the National Mall and west of South Capitol Street and is the smallest quadrant of the city. Although roughly half of the quadrant is located south of the Anacostia River in Anacostia, references to "Southwest" generally allude to the area near downtown, within about a mile of the Capitol, much of which was demolished and redeveloped in the 1960s with modern federal office and apartment buildings. Fort McNair and the National War College are also there. The section south of the river, except for the Bellevue neighborhood, is almost entirely devoted to Joint Base Anacostia-Bolling, the U.S. Naval Research Laboratory, and the Blue Plains Advanced Wastewater Treatment Plant.

== See also ==
- District of Columbia retrocession
