= Michigan Park =

Michigan Park or Park Michigan may refer to:

- Michigan Park, Washington, D.C.
- List of Michigan state parks

== See also ==
- North Michigan Park, Washington, D.C.
- Park Township, Michigan (disambiguation)
