= Queens Chapel =

Coordinates: 38.9546°N 76.9974°W

- Neighborhood
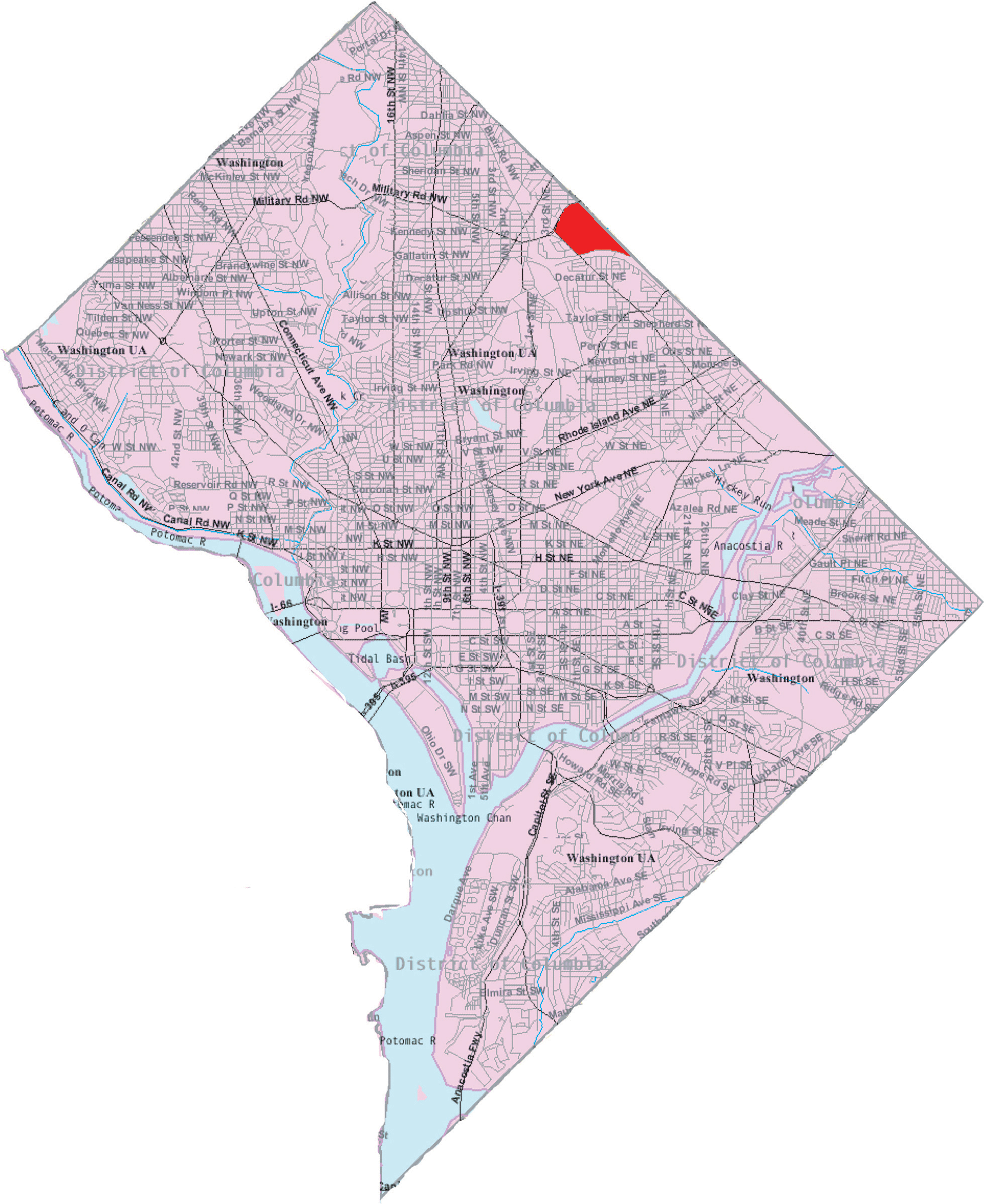
- Queens Chapel within the District of Columbia
- Country: United States
- District: Washington, D.C.
- Ward: Ward 5

Government
  - Councilmember: Zachary Parker

Queens Chapel is a mostly residential neighborhood with commercial elements located in Ward 5 of Northeast Washington, D.C.

Its namesake is the Queens Family Chapel, the first Catholic parish in DC. It burned to the ground multiple times, the last fire occurring during the Battle of Bladensburg. It was later rebuilt as St Francis de Sales Church in 1906.

== Boundaries ==
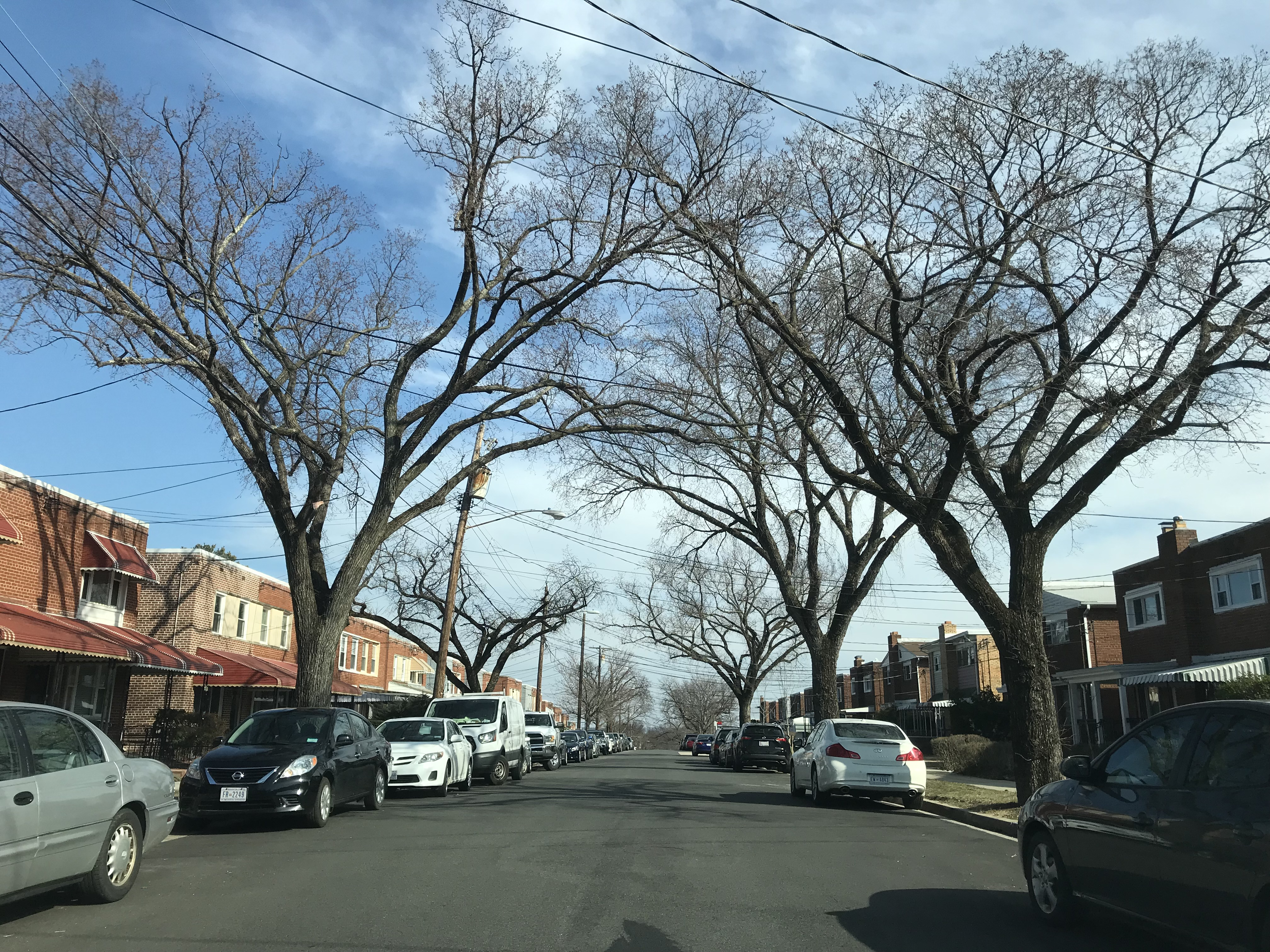
Near the intersection of Jefferson St. and Chillum Pl. NE, in Queens Chapel, in February 2018

Queens Chapel is contained between Eastern Avenue N.E. to the north, Galloway Street N.E. to the south, Riggs Rd N.E. to the north, and the Washington Metropolitan Area Red Line train tracks to the west. Queens Chapel borders the adjacent neighborhoods of Riggs Park, Fort Totten, North Michigan Park, and Michigan Park, which also are located in Ward 5 of Northeast Washington D.C. In addition to these Ward 5 neighborhoods of Northeast Washington D.C., Queens Chapel also borders the neighborhood of Chillum, which is located in Prince George's County, Maryland.

The Queens Chapel neighborhood is often confused with the Queens Chapel Neighborhood Association which is located in the Michigan Park neighborhood. It was named for early landowner Richard Queen.

== Notable places ==
Queens Chapel is home to the Bertie Backus Community College (formerly Bertie Backus Middle School, which closed and was demolished in 2008), the Lamond-Riggs Library, Food & Friends, and the Art Place at Fort Totten development.
