= Pleasant Hill (Washington, D.C.) =

Residential neighborhood in Northeast Washington, D.C.

- Neighborhood of Washington, D.C.
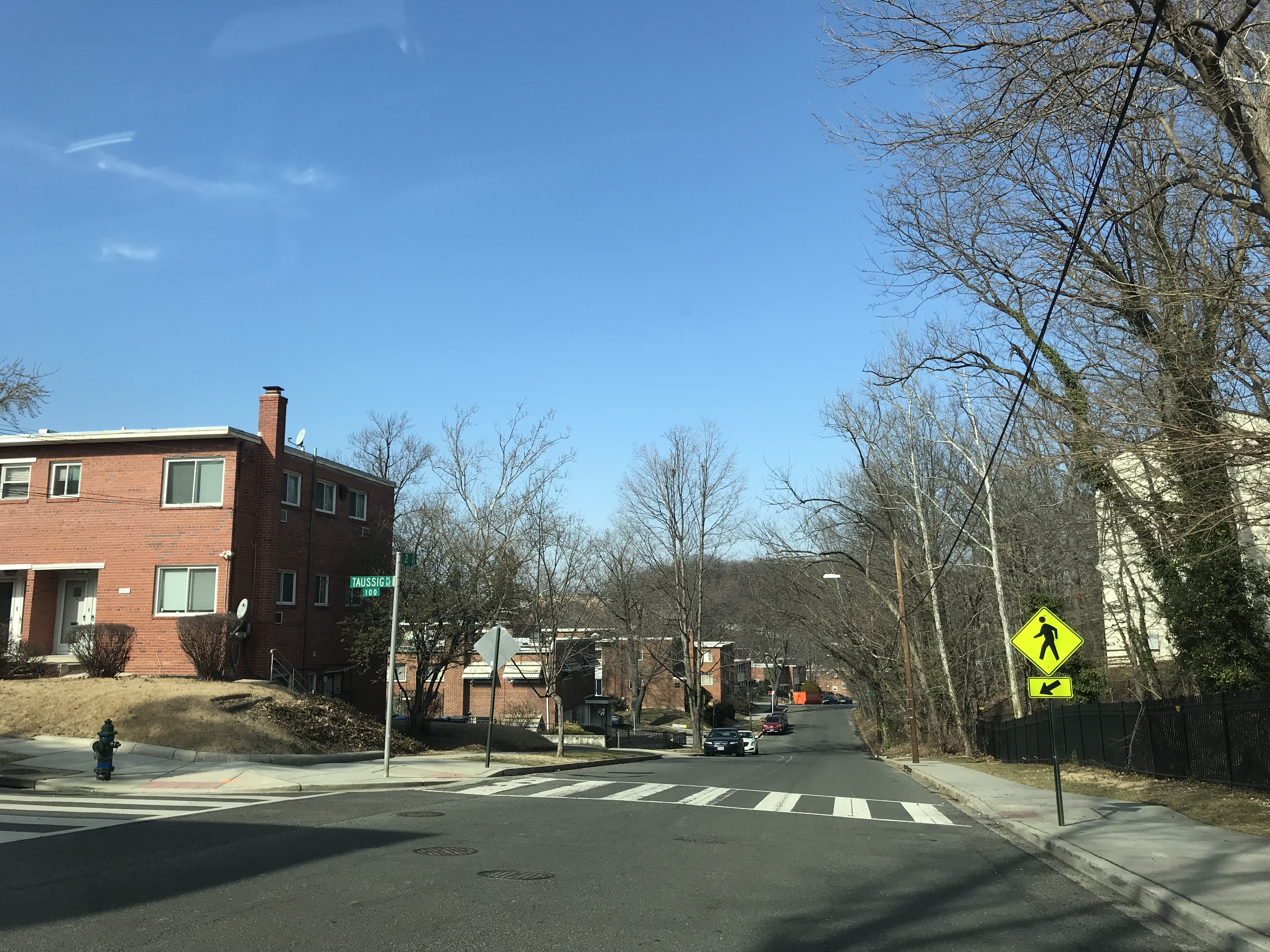
- Taussig Place and 2nd Street NE, Pleasant Hill, February 2018

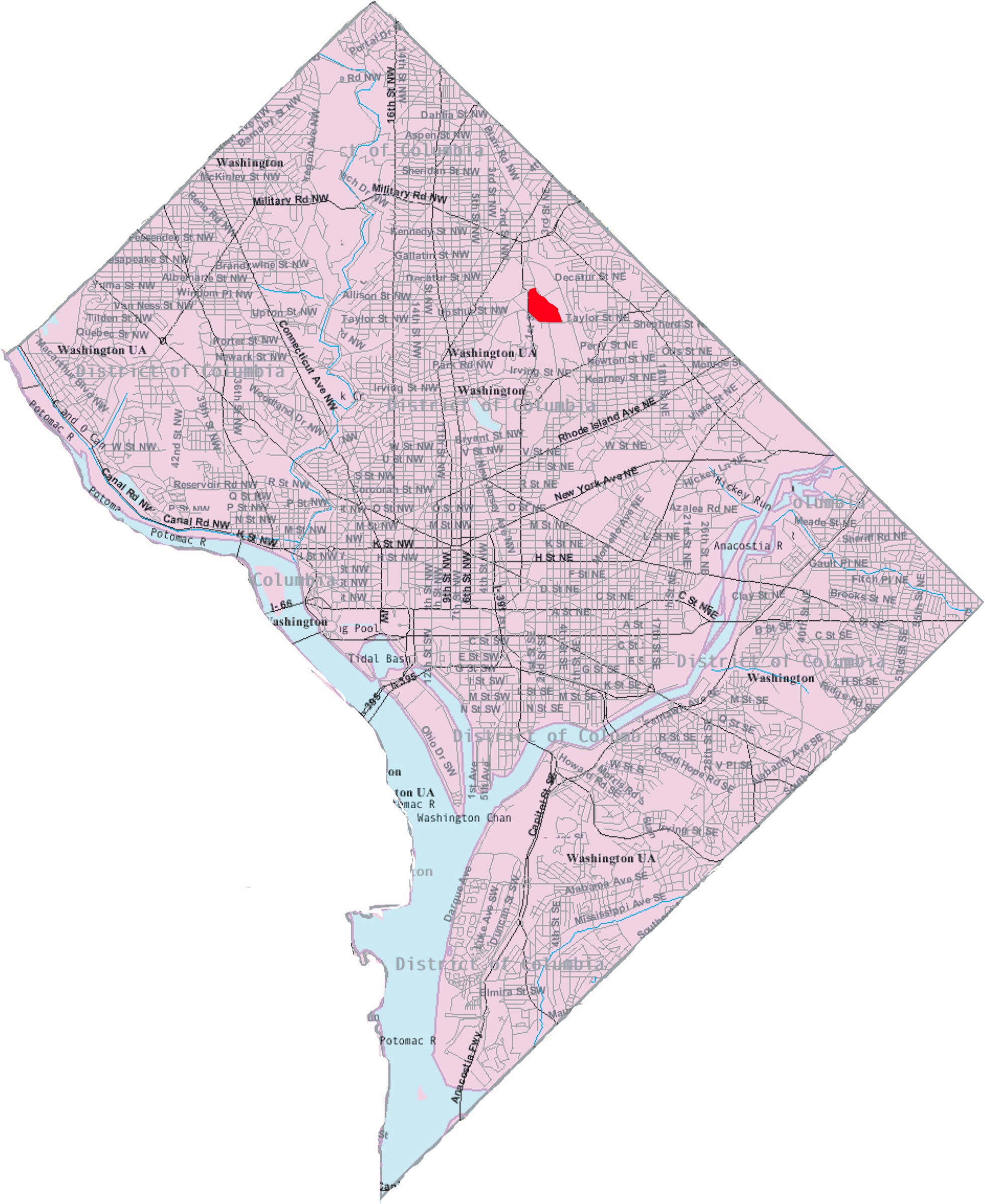
- Pleasant Hill within the District of Columbia
- Coordinates: 38.9198°N 77.02°W
- Country: United States
- District: Washington, D.C.
- Ward: Ward 5

Government
  - Councilmember: Zachary Parker
- Postal code: ZIP code

Pleasant Hill is a neighborhood located in Ward 5 of Northeast Washington, D.C. Pleasant Hill is contained between Allison Street NE and Bates Road NE to the north, Taylor Street NE to the south, the Washington Metropolitan Area Red Line tracks to the east, and North Capitol Street NW to the west. Pleasant Hill borders the adjacent neighborhoods of Fort Totten (north), North Michigan Park (northeast), Michigan Park (east), University Heights (south), Petworth (west), Brightwood Park (northwest), and Park View (southwest). It is adjacent to the Catholic University of America and houses CUA's soccer and football fields as well as its Raymond A. DuFour Athletic Center.

Pleasant Hill also borders Fort Totten Park and Fort Totten waste disposal facility on its northern end. Pleasant Hill also features direct access to the Metropolitan Branch Trail as well. The Pleasant Hill neighborhood is also located within very close proximity to Providence Hospital in the adjacent Michigan Park neighborhood, as well as the Armed Forces Retirement Home, Veterans Affairs Medical Center, MedStar Washington Hospital Center, and Children's National Hospital in the adjacent Park View neighborhood. In terms of educational institutions, the Pleasant Hill neighborhood houses Washington Yu Ying Public Charter School and the Cooper Campus of Washington Latin Public Charter School (formerly the Kirov Academy of Ballet). Residents of the Pleasant Hill neighborhood also have convenient access to the Archbishop Carroll High School in the adjacent University Heights neighborhood.

In terms of housing, Pleasant Hill generally features medium-sized brick homes constructed between the 1930s to the 1950s and contains several apartment complex, which notably are the Hawaiian Gardens apartments, Clermont Apartments, Pleasant Hills Village Apartments, and Brookland Ridge Apartments. In terms of commerce, the Pleasant Hill contains the Heights Shopping center strip mall.

In terms of transportation, residents of the Pleasant Hill neighborhood have access to Metrorail stations at Fort Totten, Brookland-CUA, and Georgia Avenue - Petworth.
