= Theological College (Catholic University of America) =

National Catholic diocesan seminary of the U.S.

Coordinates: 38°55′51″N 76°59′58″W

- Latin: Seminarium Sancti Sulpitii
- Former names: Sulpician Seminary (1917–1940)
- Type: Catholic seminary
- Established: 1917
- Affiliations: United States Conference of Catholic Bishops; Congregation for the Clergy
- Religious affiliation: Catholic Church (Catholic University of America, Society of Saint-Sulpice)
- Rector: Gladstone Stevens, P.S.S.
- Vice-Rector: Chris Arockiaraj, P.S.S.
- Students: 45
- Location: Washington, D.C., United States
- Website: theologicalcollege.org

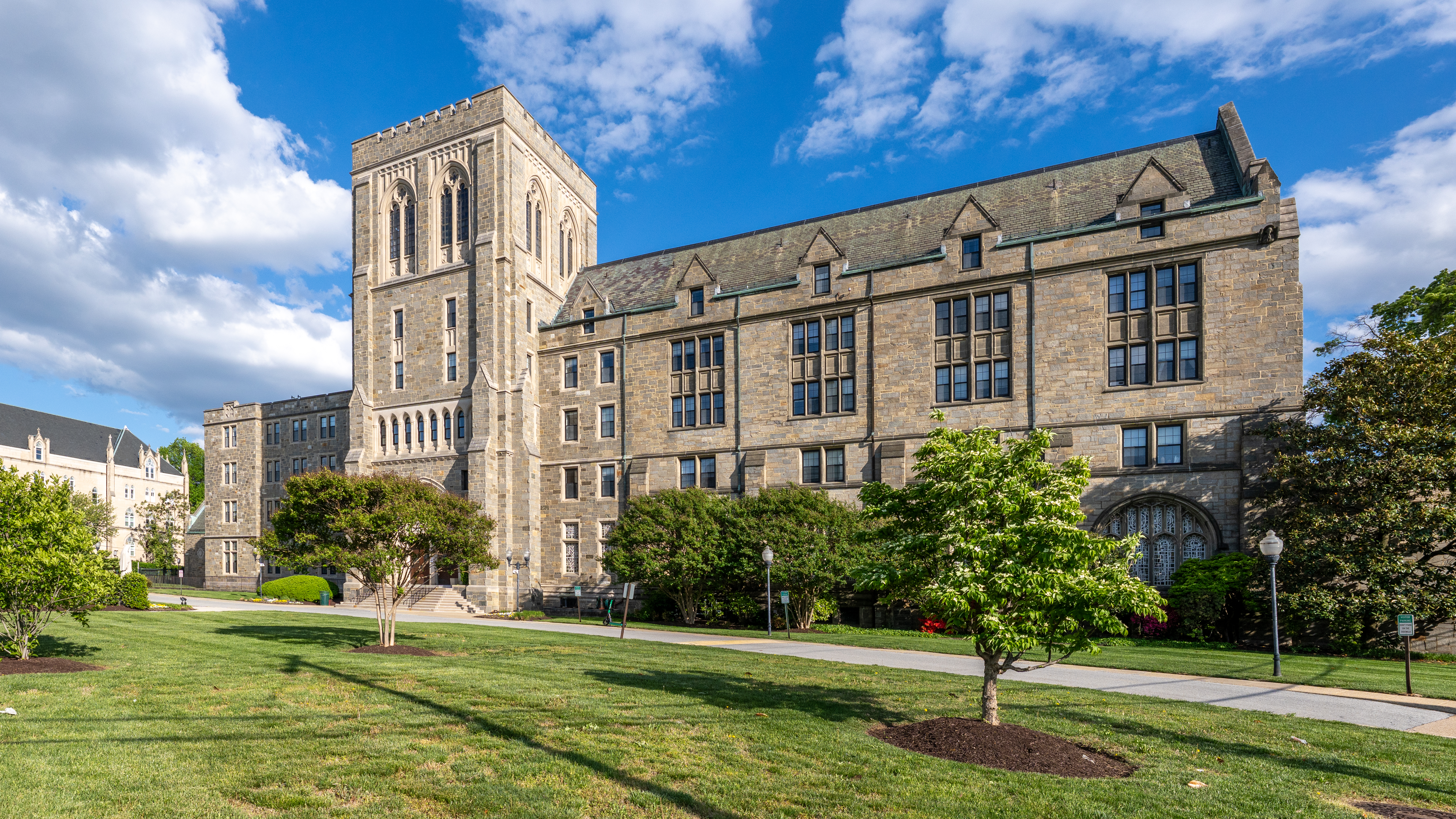
Theological College

Theological College is the national Catholic diocesan seminary for the Latin Church in the United States. The school was founded in 1917 and is located in Washington, D.C. It is affiliated with the Catholic University of America and is owned and administered by priests of the Society of the Priests of Saint Sulpice.

It is located near the campus of CUA, across from the Basilica of the National Shrine of the Immaculate Conception, and close to other Brookland-area Catholic institutions such as Capuchin College, the house of the Missionary Oblates of Mary Immaculate, and the Dominican House of Studies. The larger neighborhood is for this reason referred to as "Little Rome".

== History ==
In 1889, priests belonging to the Society of the Priests of Saint Sulpice were asked to administer the divinity college of the Catholic University of America. In 1917, they began building their own seminary next to the university. The Sulpician Seminary was first run as an extension of Saint Mary Seminary in Baltimore, Maryland, but became an independent institution in 1924. In 1940, the Catholic University school of theology assumed responsibility for training its seminarians, whereupon the seminary was renamed Theological College.

== Sulpician tradition ==
The formation program of Theological College is guided by the principles and ethos of the Sulpician Fathers as articulated by Father Jean-Jacques Olier, founder of the Society of St. Sulpice: “to live supremely for God in Christ Jesus our Lord, so much so that the inner life of His only Son should penetrate to the inmost depths of our heart and to such an extent that everyone should be able to say ‘It is no longer I who live, but Christ who lives in me.'” Founded to reform the clergy in 1630s France, the Society retains its commitment of “developing men of character, educating effective priests, forming pastoral leaders and nurturing an apostolic spirit.”

The Society's five hallmarks are a commitment to ministerial priesthood, the cultivation of an apostolic spirit, an emphasis on spiritual formation, the creation of a formational community, and the exercise of collegiality.

This approach gives special emphasis and recognition to the importance of mental prayer and spiritual direction. Particular devotion to Our Lady under the title Sedes Sapientiae, Seat of Wisdom, is another distinctive characteristic.

== Academic programs ==
The Order of Saint-Sulpice focuses on training priests through its seminaries. To that end, the Theological College provides priestly formation through three separate academic programs: a two-year certified pre-theology program; a theology program; and the Basselin scholars program for undergraduate-level seminarians. The latter, an eponymous endowed scholarship of Theodore B. Basselin for “the very best and brightest seminarians”, is administered by the Catholic University school of philosophy and students complete both a Ph.B and a Ph.L in Philosophy through this program.

The theology program at Theological College offers three degree tracks for prospective seminarians: an S.T.B./M.Div. program, an S.T.B./S.T.L. program adding an extra year of studies after priestly ordination, and an S.T.B./J.C.L. program adding two extra years of study after priestly ordination.

The seminary houses and forms seminarians from the following dioceses: Charleston, Corpus Christi, Dallas, Los Angeles, Fort Worth, Little Rock, Lafayette, Louisville, Memphis, New York, Pittsburgh, Portland, Raleigh, Richmond, Rockville Centre, Salt Lake City, Santa Fe, St. Augustine, Syracuse, Washington, and Worcester.

== Rectors ==
No.	Name	Years served
1.	Rev. Francis Havey, PSS	1917–1924; 1926
2.	Rev. John F. Fenlon, PSS	1924–1925
3.	Rev. J. Benjamin Tennelly, PSS	1926–1931
4.	Rev. Anthony Vieban, PSS	1932–1944
5.	Rev. Lloyd P. McDonald, PSS	1944–1949
6.	Rev. John P. McCormick, PSS	1949–1968
7.	Rev. Eugene A. Walsh, PSS	1968–1971
8.	Rev. Edward J. Frazer, PSS	1971–1976
9.	Rev. Anthony F. Lobo, PSS	1976–1982
10.	Rev. Albert C. Giaquinto, PSS	1982–1986
11.	Rev. Lawrence B. Terrien, PSS	1986–1992
12.	Rev. Howard P. Bleichner, PSS	1992–2002
13.	Rev. Thomas Hurst, PSS	2002–2007
14.	Rev. Mel Blanchette, PSS	2007–2011
15.	Rev. Phillip J. Brown, PSS	2011–2016
16.	Rev. Gerald D. McBrearity, PSS	2016–2020
17.	Rev. Dominic G. Ciriaco, ex-PSS	2020–2023
18.	Rev. Gladstone Stevens, PSS	2023–present

== Faculty ==
The eighteenth and current rector of Theological College is the Reverend Gladstone Stevens, PSS, Ph.D., who assumed this position in August 2023. He succeeded Reverend Dominic Ciriaco, PSS, who served as rector from 2020 to 2023. The current vice-rector is Reverend Chris Arockiaraj, PSS, M.S., S.T.B., Ph.L., Ph.D., D. Min., The faculty includes seven priests, six of whom are Sulpicians who are appointed by the Sulpician Provincial Council. The position of rector must be approved by both the president of the Catholic University and the archbishop of Washington.

== Notable alumni ==
Theological College is the alma mater of over 1,500 priests, including 45 bishops and six cardinals. These include:

- Cardinal Joseph Bernardin
- Cardinal Raymond Leo Burke (B.A., 1970; M.A., 1971)
- Cardinal Daniel DiNardo (B.A., M.A.)
- Cardinal James Aloysius Hickey
- Cardinal Humberto Sousa Medeiros
- Cardinal Donald Wuerl (B.A., 1962; M.A., 1963)
- Archbishop Philip Hannan (M.A.)
- Bishop Robert Barron
- Bishop Martin Holley
- Bishop William Clifford Newman
- Bishop Michael Fors Olson (B.A., 1988; M.A., 1989)
- Bishop Mitchell T. Rozanski
- Monsignor Stephen Joseph Rossetti
- Monsignor John F. Wippel (B.A., 1955; M.A., 1956)
- Father Raymond E. Brown, S.S. (B.A., 1948; M.A. 1949)
