= Stronghold (Washington, D.C.) =

Stronghold/Metropolis View
- Neighborhood of Washington, D.C.
- Interactive map of Stronghold/Metropolis View
- Coordinates: 38.9249°N 77.0084°W
- Country: United States
- District: Washington, D.C.
- Ward: Ward 5

Government
  - Councilmember: Zachary Parker
- Postal code: ZIP code

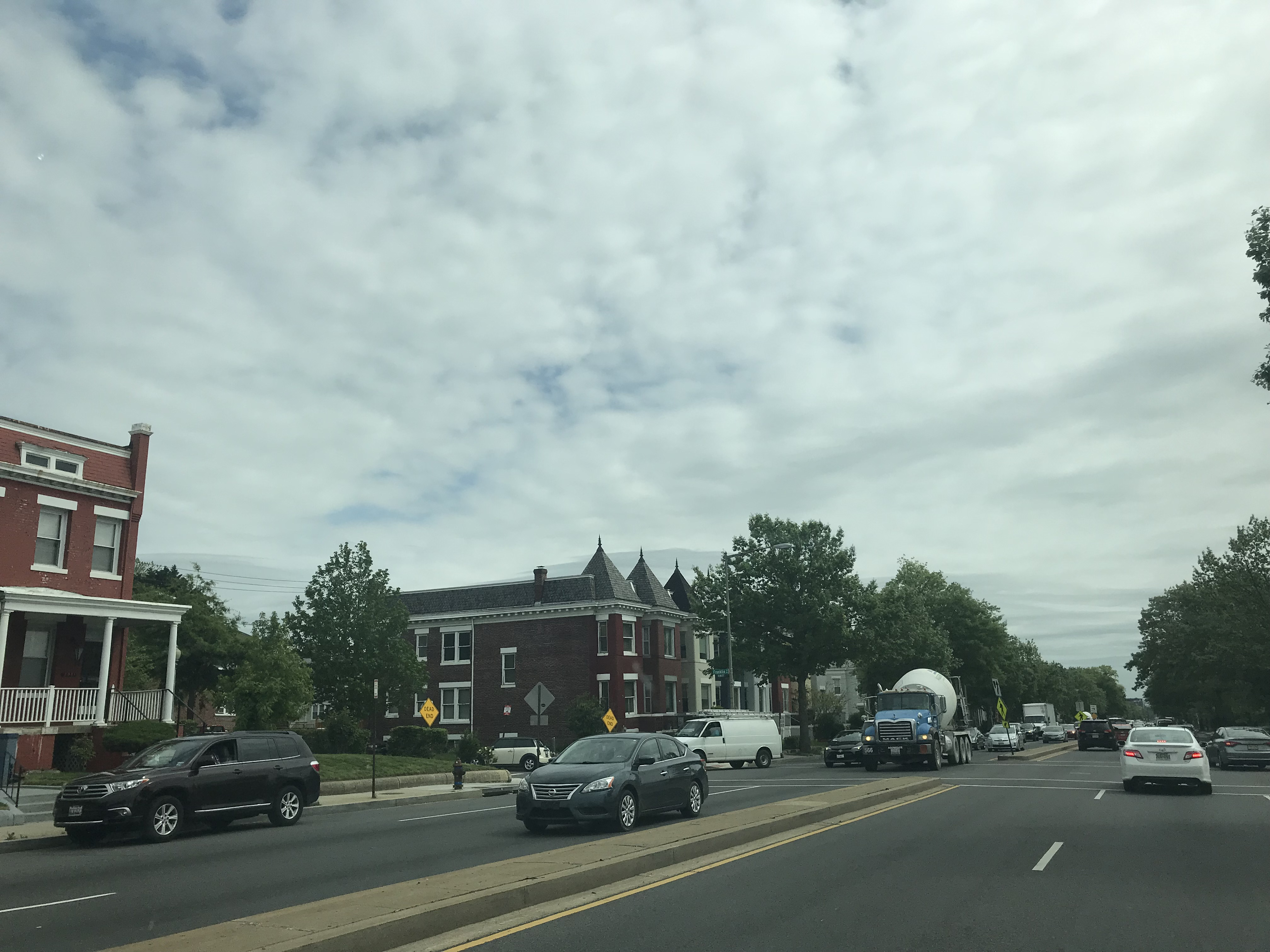
Stronghold. Intersection of North Capitol St. and Franklin St. NE, April 2019

Stronghold is a neighborhood in Ward 5 of Northeast Washington D.C. Stronghold is contained between Michigan Avenue N.E. to the north, North Capitol Street N.W. to the west, and Glenwood Cemetery to both the south and east. Stronghold borders the adjacent neighborhoods of Edgewood, University Heights, and Brookland in Ward 5 of Northeast Washington D.C.

In terms of public transportation, the closest subway stations are the Brookland-CUA and Rhode Island Avenue stations, which are both served by the Washington Metro's Red Line.
