= Park Township, Michigan =

Park Township is the name of some places in the U.S. state of Michigan:

- Park Township, Ottawa County, Michigan
- Park Township, St. Joseph County, Michigan
