= University Heights (Washington, D.C.) =

Coordinates: 38.9398°N 76.9936°W

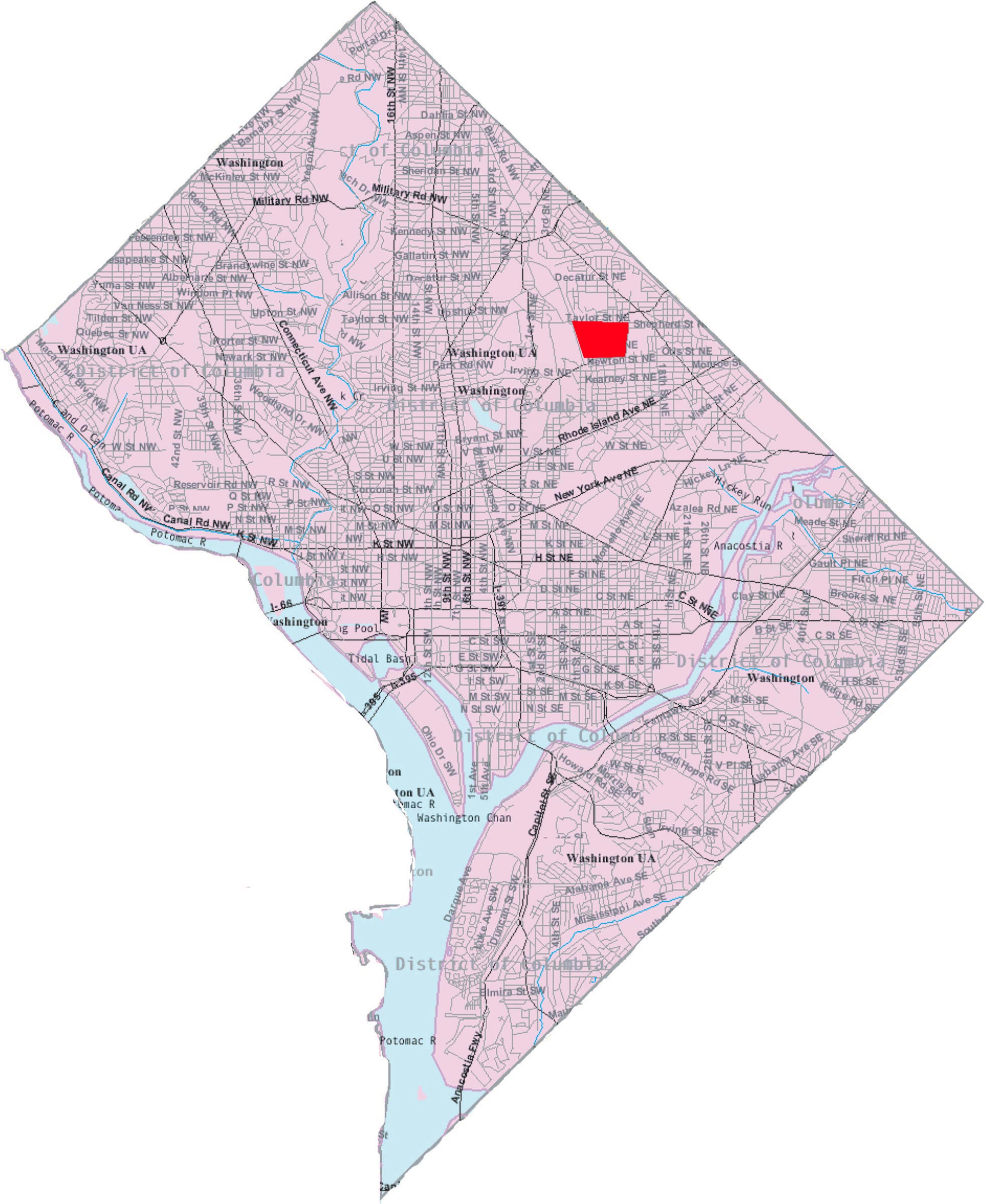
Map of Washington, D.C., with University Heights highlighted in red

University Heights is a neighborhood adjacent to The Catholic University of America in Ward 5 of Northeast Washington, D.C. in the Upper Northeast area element. It is located east of the University and west of the Franciscan Monastery, bounded by the tracks for the Red Line of the Washington Metro to the west; 14th Street NE to the east; Taylor Street to the north; and Otis Street to the south. University Heights is in DC Neighborhood Cluster 20 along with the Michigan Park and North Michigan Park neighborhoods.

University Heights is often thought of as a section of the Brookland neighborhood, largely because Brookland Elementary School is inside University Heights, but is actually a separate neighborhood north of Brookland proper.

Contained within University Heights are Fort Bunker Hill Park and Turkey Thicket Park & Recreation Center.
