= Capuchin College =

Catholic seminary in Washington, D.C., U.S.

- Type: Catholic seminary (Roman Rite)
- Location: 4121 Harewood Rd NE, Washington, D.C. 20017, United States; 38°56′25″N 77°0′7″W
- Website: http://www.capuchin.com/, http://capuchincollege.com/

Capuchin College is a Catholic seminary located in Washington, D.C., United States. It is owned and administered by the Order of Friars Minor Capuchin.

Built in the early 1900s, it serves as a house of Post-Novitiate training in the United States and belongs to the Capuchin Province of St. Augustine.

The college is located in close proximity to the Catholic University of America, the Basilica of the National Shrine of the Immaculate Conception, the Dominican House of Studies, and Theological College.

== Notable alumni ==
- Cardinal Seán Patrick O'Malley - Archbishop of Boston (2003 - Present)
- Archbishop Charles J. Chaput - Archbishop of Philadelphia (2011 - 2020)
