= Northeast (Washington, D.C.) =

Coordinates: 38°57′51.8″N 77°0′16.5″W

- Quadrant
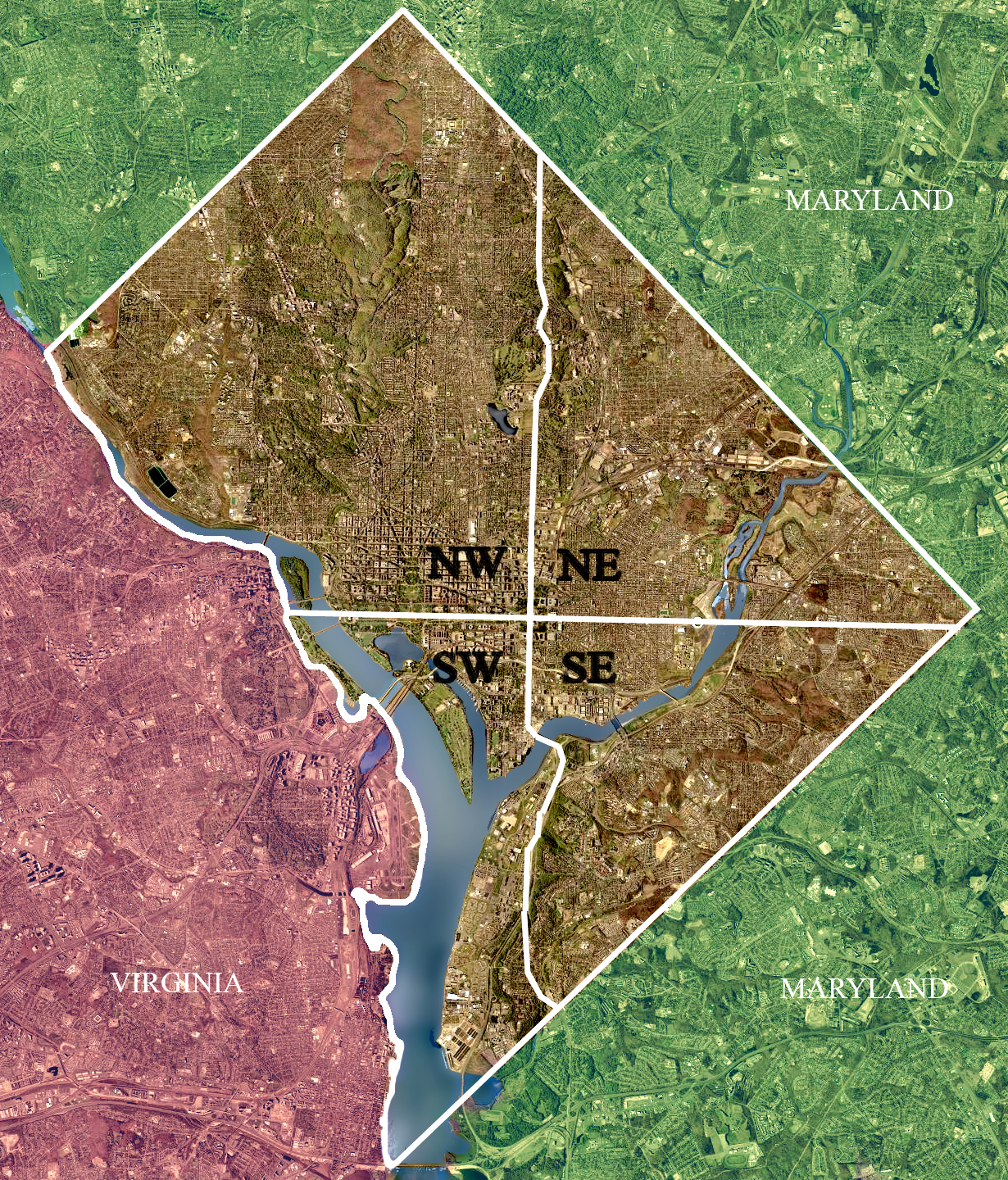
- Color-enhanced 2002 USGS satellite image of Washington, D.C. The crosshairs in the image mark the quadrant divisions of Washington, D.C., with the United States Capitol at the center of the dividing lines. To the west of the Capitol is the National Mall, which is visible as a slight green band in the image. The Northwest quadrant is the largest, located north of the National Mall and west of North Capitol Street.
- Interactive map of Northeast
- Country: United States
- District: Washington, D.C.

Northeast (NE or N.E.) is the northeastern quadrant of Washington, D.C., the capital of the United States. It encompasses the area located north of East Capitol Street and east of North Capitol Street.

== Geography ==
Northeast includes the 35 neighborhoods of:

- Arboretum
- Benning
- Benning Heights
- Brentwood
- Brookland
- Burrville
- Carver Langston
- Capitol Hill
- Central Northeast/Mahaning Heights
- Deanwood
- East Corner
- Eastland Gardens
- Eckington
- Edgewood
- Fort Lincoln
- Fort Totten
- Gateway
- Hillbrook
- Ivy City
- Kenilworth
- Kingman Park
- Lamond Riggs
- Langdon
- Lincoln Heights
- Mayfair
- Michigan Park
- Near Northeast
- North Michigan Park
- Pleasant Hill
- Riggs Park
- River Terrace
- Stronghold
- Trinidad
- Woodridge

A significant section of Capitol Hill is also located in Northeast, as is part of NoMa.

== Landmarks ==
Northeast is home to Gallaudet University, a federally chartered private university for the education of the deaf and hard of hearing located in the Trinidad neighborhood. It is also home to The Catholic University of America and Trinity Washington University, two of the Catholic institutions which give the Brookland neighborhood its nickname of "Little Rome" or "Little Vatican." Others include the Basilica of the National Shrine of the Immaculate Conception, the Saint John Paul II National Shrine, the Mount St. Sepulchre Franciscan Monastery, the Ukrainian Catholic National Shrine of the Holy Family, Saint Anselm's Abbey Benedictine Monastery, the Dominican House of Studies, the Missionaries of Charity Gift of Peace Home, the Capuchin College, and the headquarters of the United States Conference of Catholic Bishops.

The quadrant is home to two large public gardens located below the waistline of the Anacostia River: the United States National Arboretum and Kenilworth Aquatic Gardens. The headquarters of The Heritage Foundation, one of the nation's largest think tanks, and The Washington Times, a daily newspaper in the city, are also located in Northeast.

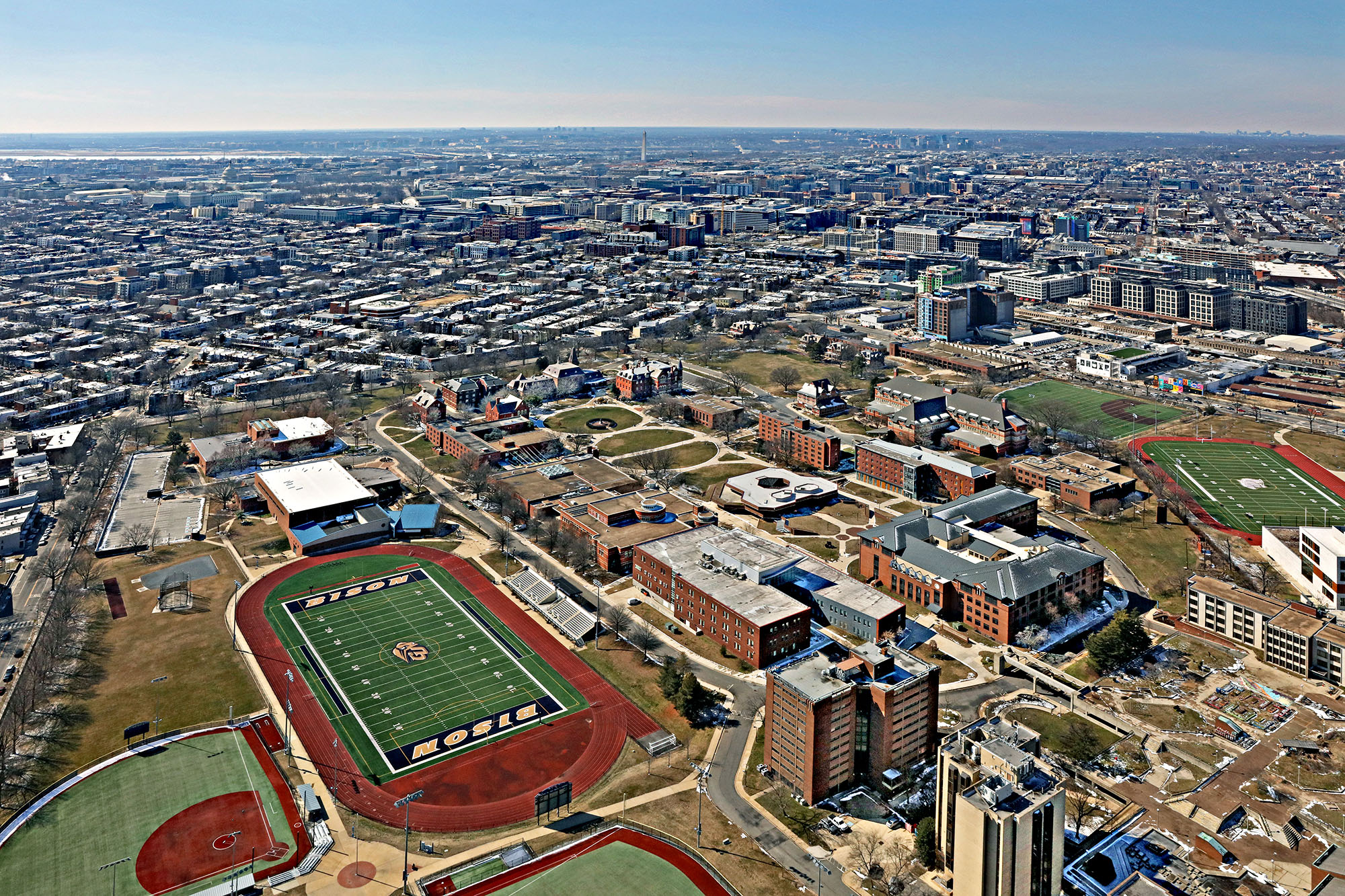
Gallaudet University

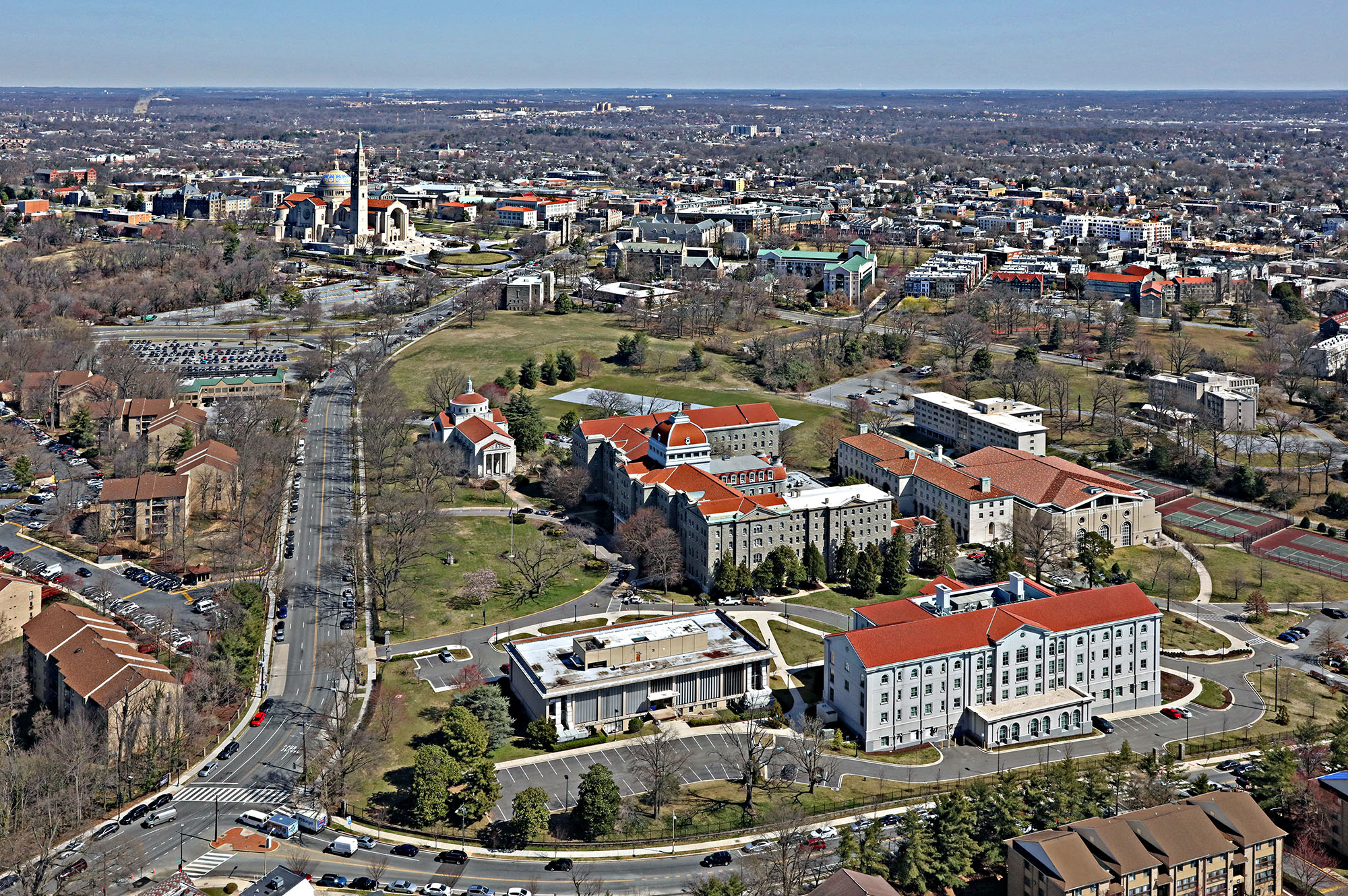
Trinity Washington University

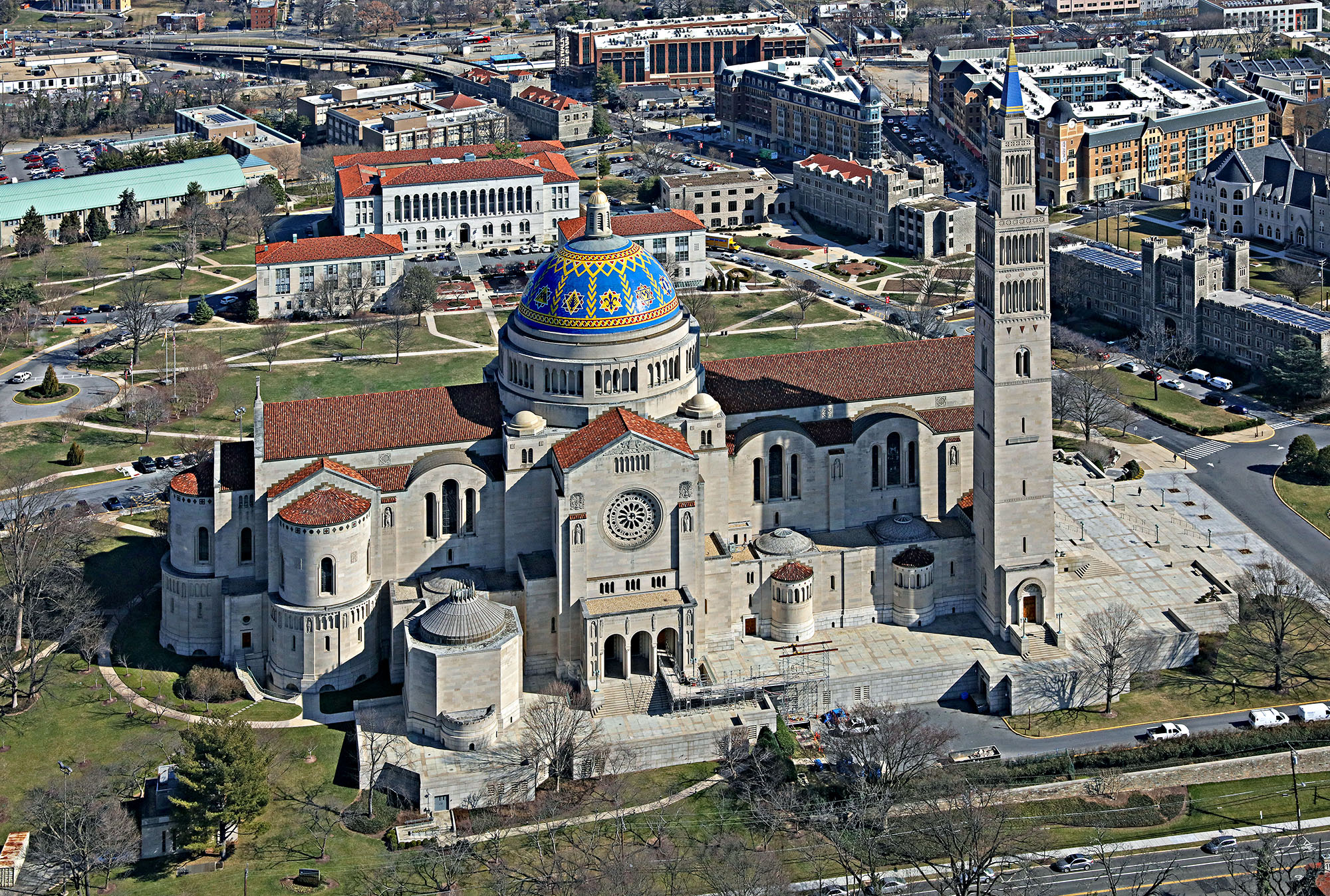
Basilica of the National Shrine of the Immaculate Conception

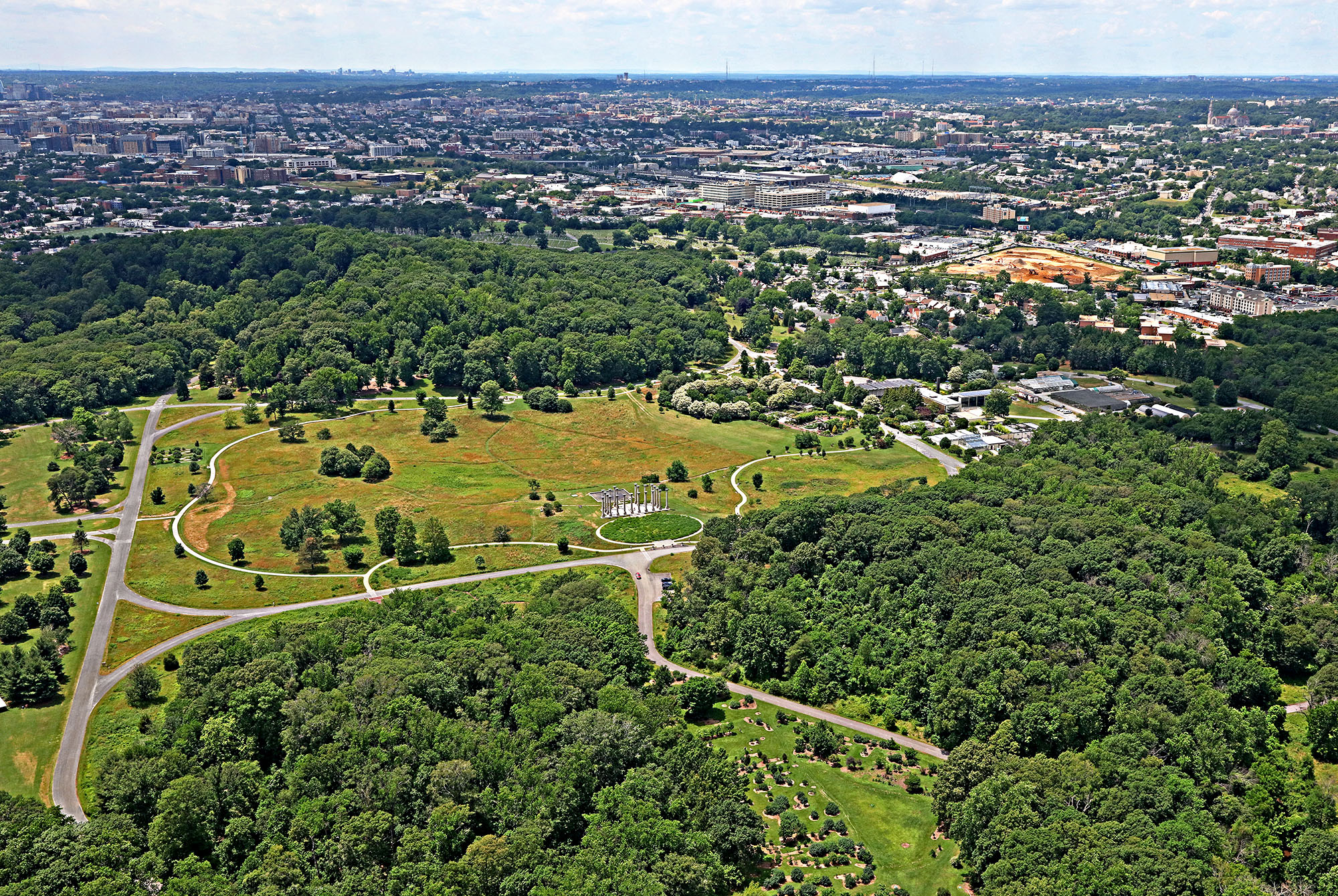
United States National Arboretum

== Transportation ==
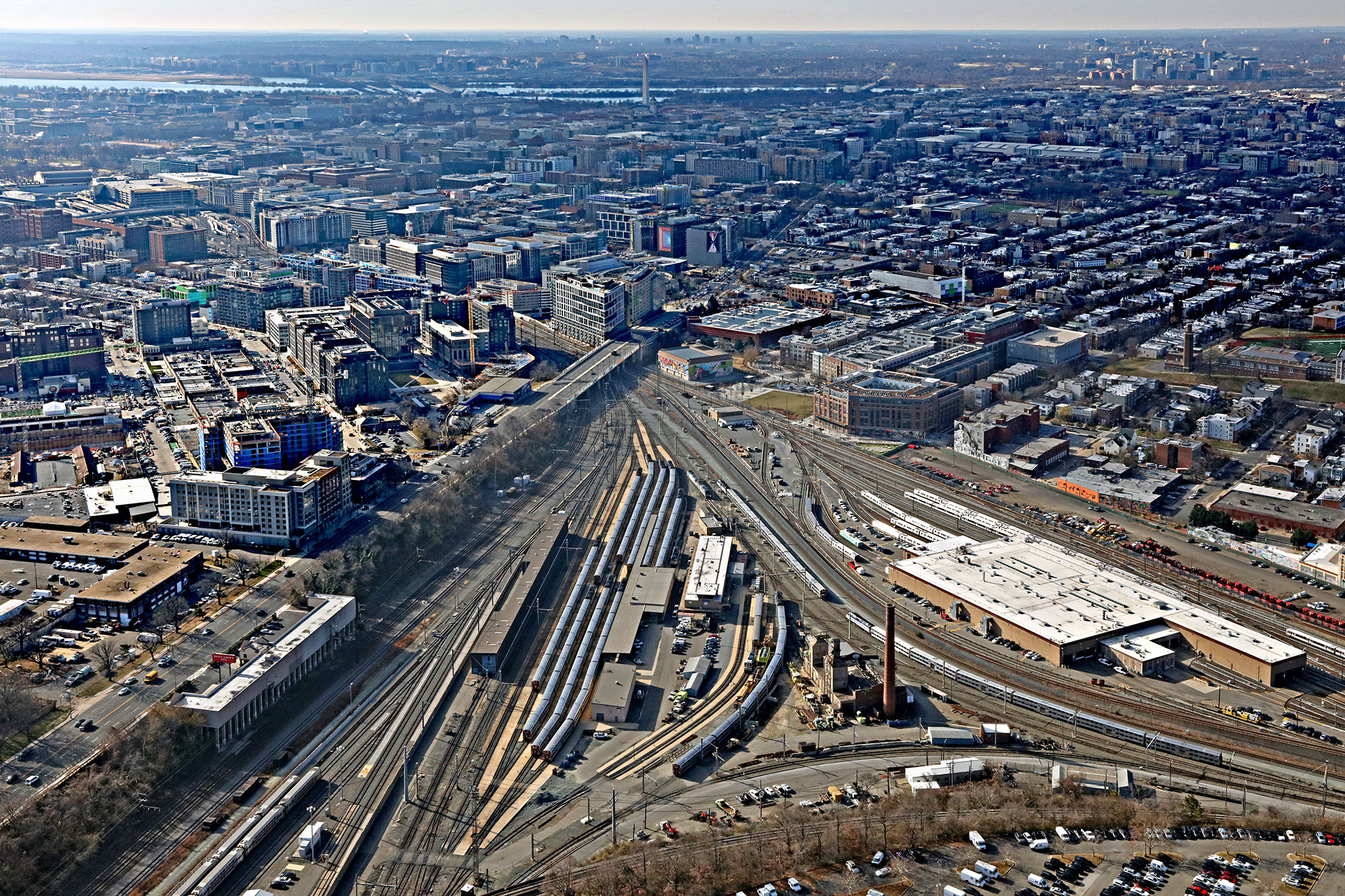
Amtrak Coach Yard and the Washington Metropolitan Area Transit Authority Brentwood Rail Yard

Northeast is bounded by North Capitol Street on the west, Eastern Avenue to the east, and East Capitol Street to the south. Other principal roads include the Baltimore–Washington Parkway (DC 295); Bladensburg Road and South Dakota Avenue running north–south; and Florida Avenue, Benning Road, New York Avenue (U.S. Route 50), and Rhode Island Avenue (U.S. Route 1) running east–west.

Northeast is served by five of the six lines of the Washington Metro: the Orange, Silver, Red, Blue, and Green Lines. Washington Union Station is a major intermodal hub, combining the busiest station in the Metrorail system; rail service by Amtrak, MARC, and Virginia Railway Express commuter rail systems. Bus services are provided by Greyhound, Peter Pan, Trailways, Megabus, and other companies. The DC Streetcar's H Street NE/Benning Road Line also serves the area.

== Politics ==
Politically, Northeast includes most of Ward 5, much of Ward 6 and Ward 7, and parts of Ward 4.

== Demographics ==
The population of Northeast Washington is 42% Non-Hispanic White, 36% Black, 5% Asian, 1% Pacific Islander, 10% Hispanic White, 7% Other.

== See also ==
- SW – Southwest, Washington, D.C.
- SE – Southeast, Washington, D.C.
- NW – Northwest, Washington, D.C.
