= Riggs Park =

Riggs Park (Lamond Riggs)
- Neighborhood of Washington, D.C.
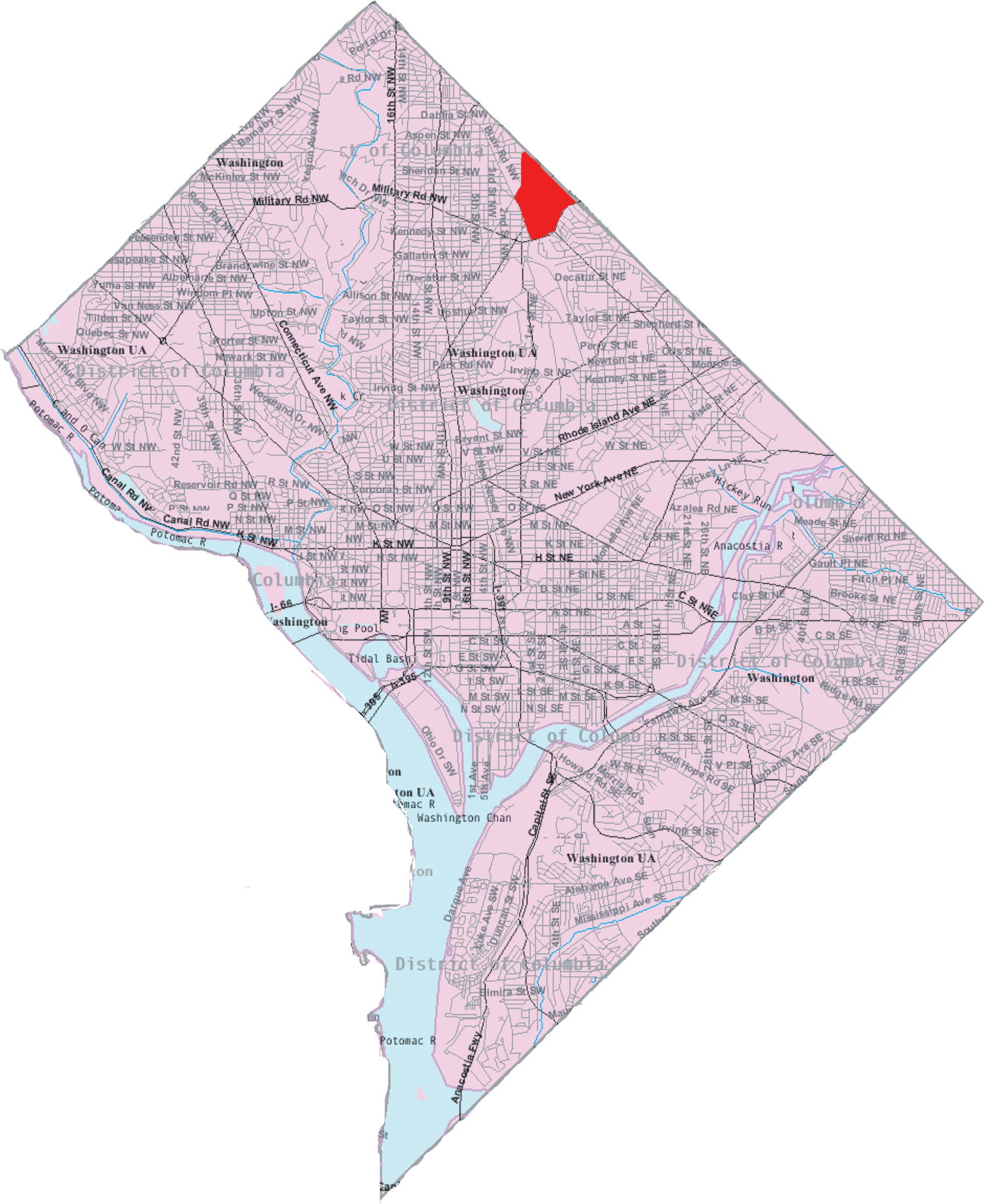
- Riggs Park within the District of Columbia
- Coordinates: 38.9539°N 76.9942°W
- Country: United States
- District: Washington, D.C.
- Ward: 4

Government
  - Councilmember: Janeese Lewis George
- ZIP code: 20011
- Area code: 202

Riggs Park is a residential neighborhood in Ward 4 of Northeast Washington, D.C. It is part of the greater Lamond-Riggs community (comprising the Lamond neighborhood to the north, and Riggs Park to the south). Riggs Park is bounded by South Dakota Ave NE to the west, Eastern Ave NE to the east, Galloway St NE to the south, and New Hampshire Ave NE to the north. Riggs Park is adjacent to the neighborhoods of Michigan Park, and Fort Totten, located in Ward 5 of Northeast Washington D.C. In addition to these neighborhoods, Riggs Park also borders the city/neighborhood Chillum, which is located in Prince George's County, Maryland. The WMATA Red Line train tracks pass through the Riggs Park neighborhood when traveling between the Takoma and Fort Totten Metro stations, alongside the adjacent CSX, MARC, and Amtrak train tracks.

== History ==
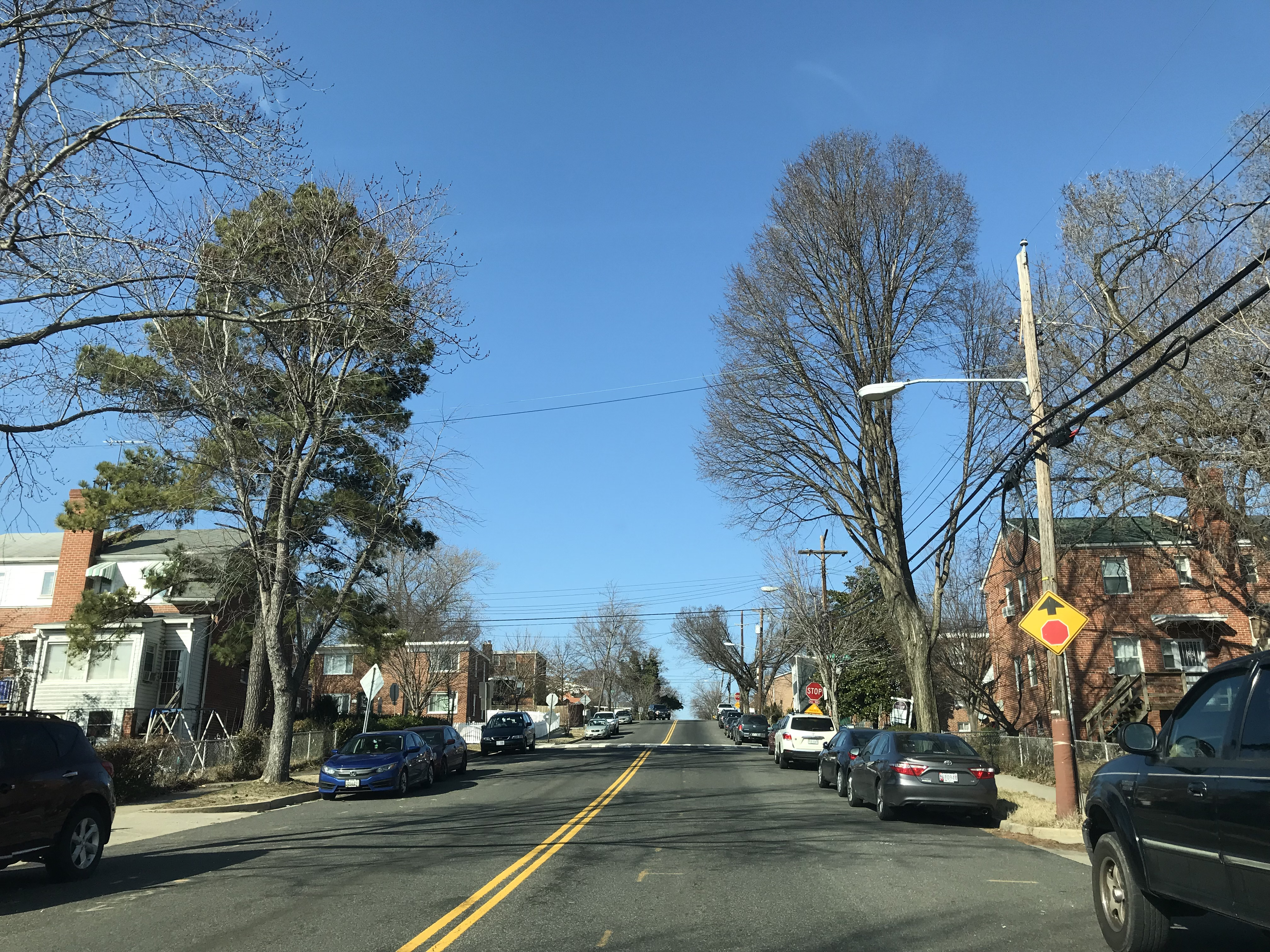
Intersection of 3rd St and Nicholson St. NE, Riggs Park, February 2018

Most of Riggs Park's residents were white and Jewish until the 1960s when most of them began leaving the city to settle in the suburbs. Riggs Park's combination of affordable housing and convenience/proximity to Downtown Washington, D.C., attracted many African-American residents to move in. Riggs Park was home to two synagogues in the 1950s, including a Conservative synagogue named Shaare Tefila Congregation. Shaare Tefila was relocated to White Oak in 1965. In 2011, Shaare Tefila was relocated again to Olney, where many young members now live. During the height of the Jewish community, Riggs Park was known as the "Little Tel Aviv" of Washington, D.C., and was home to a large population of young Jewish couples and their families. The Jewish community grew quickly in the 1950s because many Jews who had served in the military were eligible to purchase a home under the G.I. Bill. As African-Americans began to move to Riggs Park in the 1960s, the majority of Jews in the neighborhood sold their homes and moved to suburban Maryland. By the early 1980s, Riggs Park was home to a large middle-class black population.

In 2001, Chevron told residents of Riggs Park that gasoline had spilled just across the Maryland state line 12 years prior and that the fuel had seeped under 169 residents' houses, an elementary school, and a church. Residents filed a lawsuit in United States District Court. Chevron said it had complied with laws by informing the state of Maryland about the leak after its discovery and that it was pumping the gas out of the ground and removing the contaminated dirt. In 2007, the Environmental Protection Agency announced plans to clean up leaked gasoline, to be paid for by Chevron. In 2009, the District of Columbia released environmental test results, and perchloroethylene and methyl tert-butyl ether were detected in shallow groundwater samples. Gasoline was detected in soil samples. Chevron settled a lawsuit with the District of Columbia Department of the Environment in 2011. Chevron agreed to pay for the installation of Vapor Mitigation Systems into 43 homes in Riggs Park.
