= Fort Totten (Washington, D.C.) =

- Neighborhood of Washington, D.C.
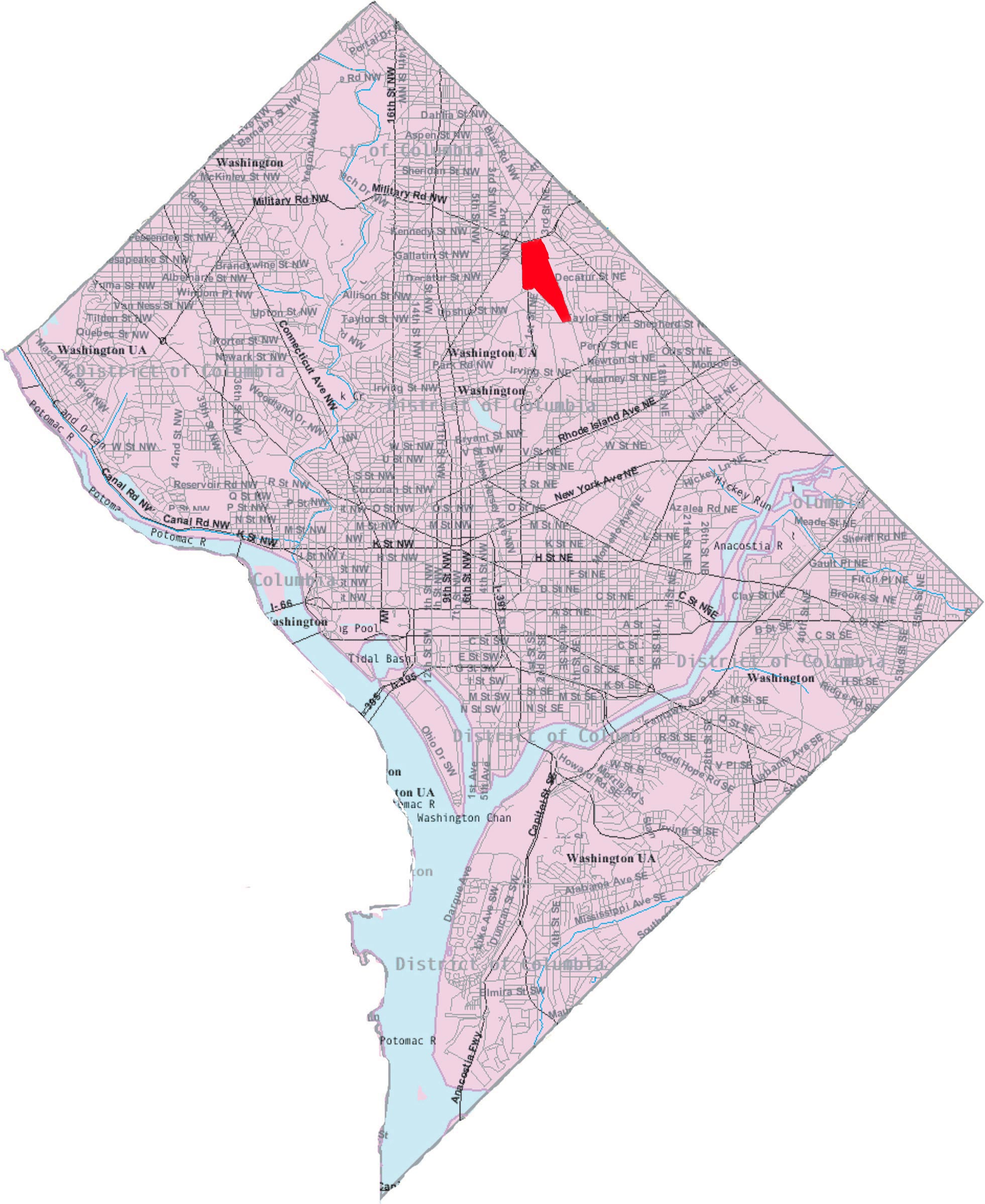
- Fort Totten within the District of Columbia
- Coordinates: 38°56′49″N 77°00′15″W
- Country: United States
- District: Washington, D.C.
- Ward: Ward 5

Government
  - Councilmember: Kenyan McDuffie
- Time zone: UTC−05:00 (EST)
  - Summer (DST): UTC−04:00 (EDT)
- ZIP Code: 20011
- Area code: 202
- Geocode: 87C4WXXV+9V

Fort Totten is a neighborhood located in Ward 5 of Northeast Washington, D.C.

Fort Totten is located between Riggs Road N.E. to the north, Bates Rd N.E., Allison Street N.E., and the southern end of Fort Totten Park to the south, the Washington Metro Red Line tracks to the east, and North Capitol Street NW to the west.

The Washington Metro's Green Line tracks also go through the Fort Totten neighborhood through a tunnel that goes through Fort Totten Park when traveling between the Fort Totten and Georgia Avenue-Petworth Metro Stations. Fort Totten borders the adjacent neighborhood of Riggs Park in Ward 4 of Northeast Washington D.C., Queens Chapel and Michigan Park in Ward 5 of Northeast Washington D.C., Brightwood Park and Petworth in Ward 4 of Northwest Washington D.C.

Fort Totten is close to the Catholic University of America, Providence Hospital, Armed Forces Retirement Home, Rock Creek Cemetery, President Lincoln's Cottage, and Soldiers' Home Cemetery. The Fort Totten neighborhood of Washington, D.C. is named after a Civil War-era fort built by General Joseph Gilbert Totten, the Chief Engineer of the antebellum United States Army.

Residents of Fort Totten not only have access to Fort Totten Park, but also to the Washington Metropolitan Branch Trail which runs all the way from the Silver Spring Metro Station to Washington Union Station in the Capitol Hill neighborhood of Washington, D.C. Residents who live in the Fort Totten neighborhood have access to the Fort Totten Metro Station, which has primarily been served by the Red Line since the station first opened on February 6, 1978, as well as the Green Line which has been serving the station since December 11, 1993, and the Yellow Line, which has been serving the station since May, 2006. In addition to these Metrorail Lines, residents of Fort Totten are also served by many Metrobus routes as well.

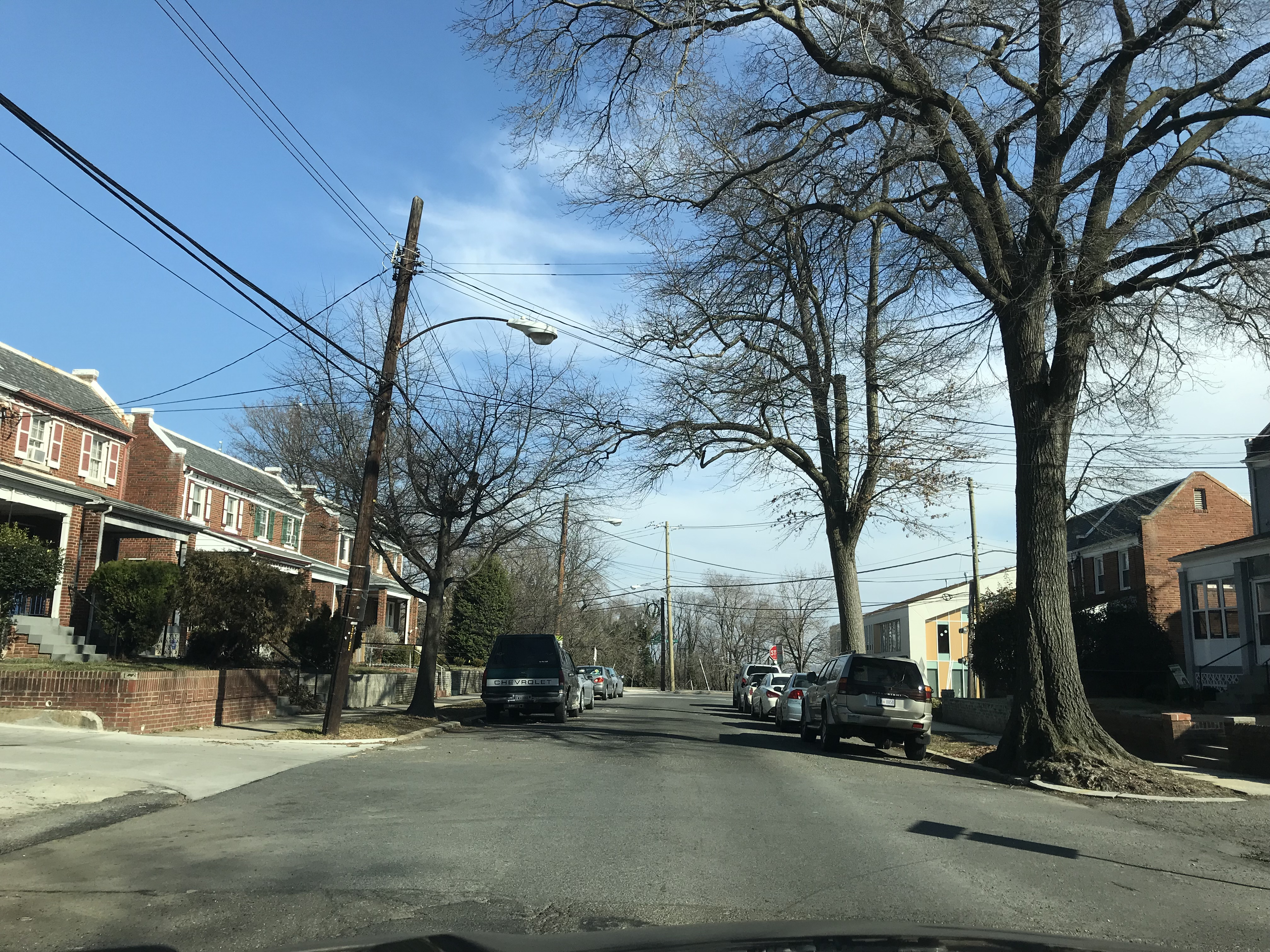
Intersection of Hamilton St and Rock Creek Church Rd, NE, February 2018

== Civil War Fort ==
The neighborhood takes its name from the Civil War fort located at the top of the hill. It was built in 1861 and completed in 1863 to provide protection to the capital during the civil war. The fort is named for Joseph Gilbert Totten, a general in the War of 1812.

The earthworks of the main fort are still clearly visible today, including the surrounding ditch, ramparts, and the walls of the two magazines within the fort. The smaller Totten Battery, which lies 1000 feet to the north, and the connecting rifle trenches can be easily seen as well. The modern-day park is home to a number of picnic benches as well as a Civil War centennial plaque marking the main entrance to the remains of the fort.

== Bibliography ==
- Hannings, Bud (2006). Forts of the United States: An Historical Dictionary, 16th through 19th Centuries. Jefferson, North Carolina: McFarland. ISBN 978-0-7864-1796-4.
