= North Michigan Park =

- Neighborhood of Washington, D.C.
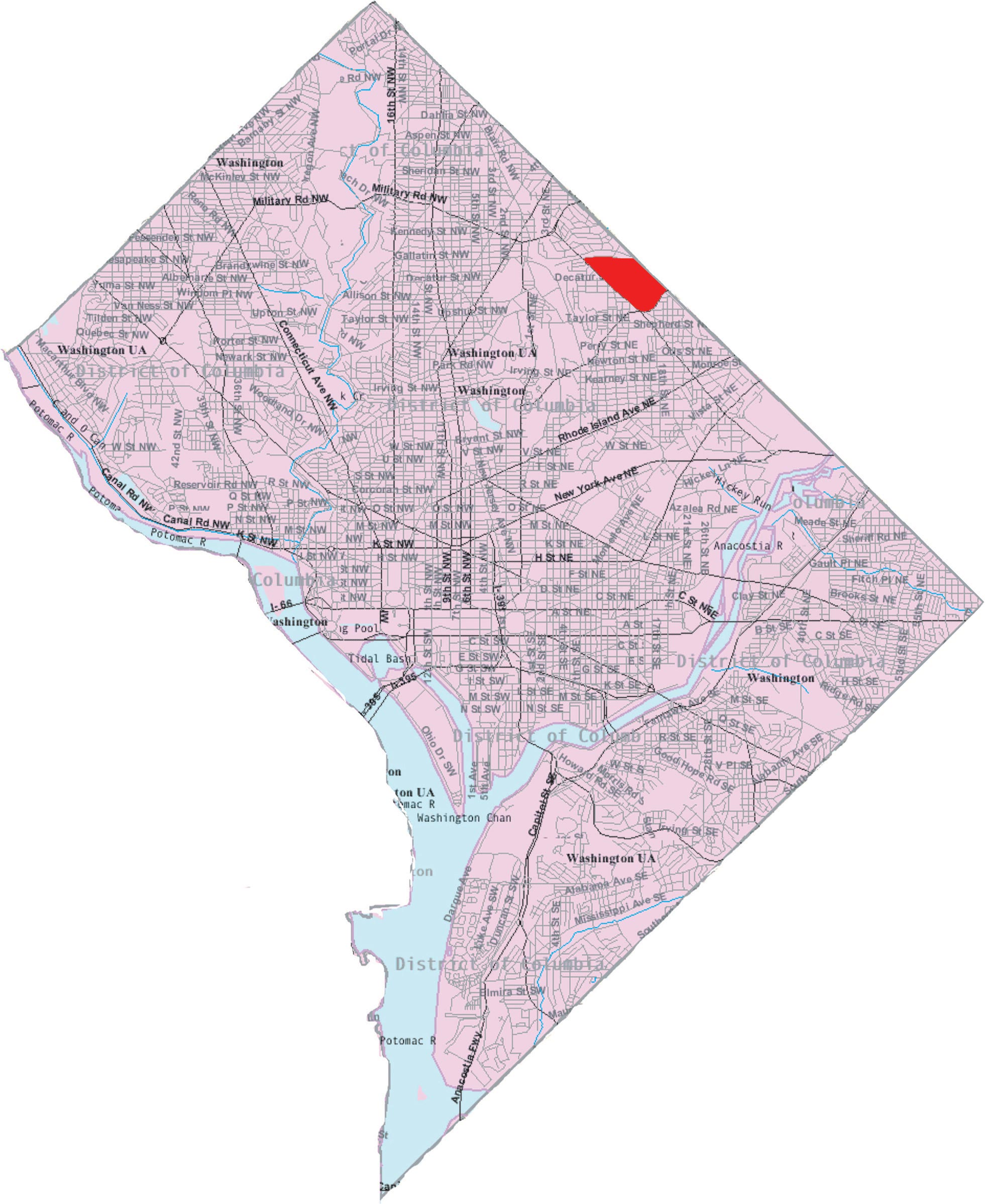
- North Michigan Park within the District of Columbia
- Coordinates: 38.9454°N 76.996°W
- Country: United States
- District: Washington, D.C.
- Ward: Ward 5

Government
  - Councilmember: Zachary Parker
- Postal code: ZIP code

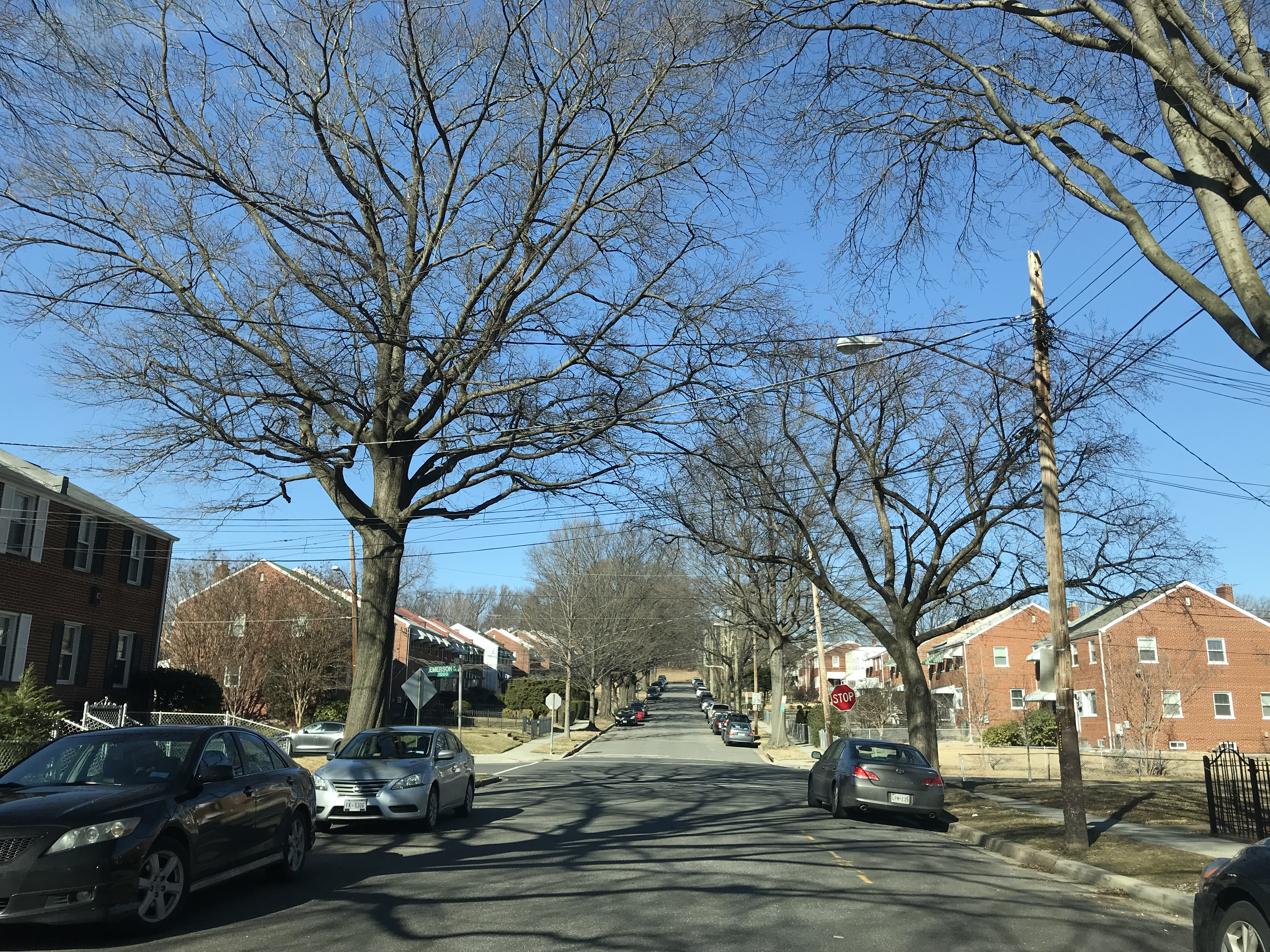
Intersection of 11th St. and Emerson St., NE, in North Michigan Park, February 2019

North Michigan Park is a neighborhood located in Ward 5 of Northeast Washington, D.C. North Michigan Park is contained between Eastern Avenue N.E. to the east, Gallatin Street N.E. to the north, Michigan Avenue N.E. to the south, and South Dakota Avenue N.E. to the west. North Michigan Park borders the neighborhoods of Michigan Park, Queens Chapel, and Woodridge, which also are located in Ward 5 of Northeast Washington D.C. In addition to these neighborhoods in Ward 5 of Northeast Washington D.C., North Michigan Park also borders the adjacent neighborhoods of Avondale and Chillum, which are both located in Prince George's County, Maryland. North Michigan Park neighborhood is often confused with the North Michigan Park Civic Association which has boundaries that include both North Michigan Park and Michigan Park. North Michigan Park and Michigan Park neighborhoods have been historically designated as separate neighborhoods because they were segregated by race. North Michigan Park was the less desirable neighborhood where African-Americans lived while Michigan Park was a much more desirable neighborhood where the neighborhood where their white counterparts lived. Both neighborhoods are separated from each other by South Dakota Avenue N.E. The Washington Metropolitan Area Green Line train tracks pass through the North Michigan Park neighborhood, notably, through a tunnel when traveling between the West Hyattsville and Fort Totten Metro Stations. The Washington Metropolitan Area Green Line train tracks initially are above ground when traveling between the West Hyattsville Metro Station and a certain portion of the neighborhood of Avondale. The Washington Metropolitan Area Green Line tracks then gradually enter a tunnel, which they use throughout the rest of the Avondale neighborhood, a small portion of the Chillum neighborhood, the North Michigan Park neighborhood, and Queens Chapel neighborhood before entering the lower level portion of the Fort Totten Metro Station, located below the Washington Metropolitan Area Red Line train tracks.
