= Zachary Parker =

American activist & politician (born 1986/87)

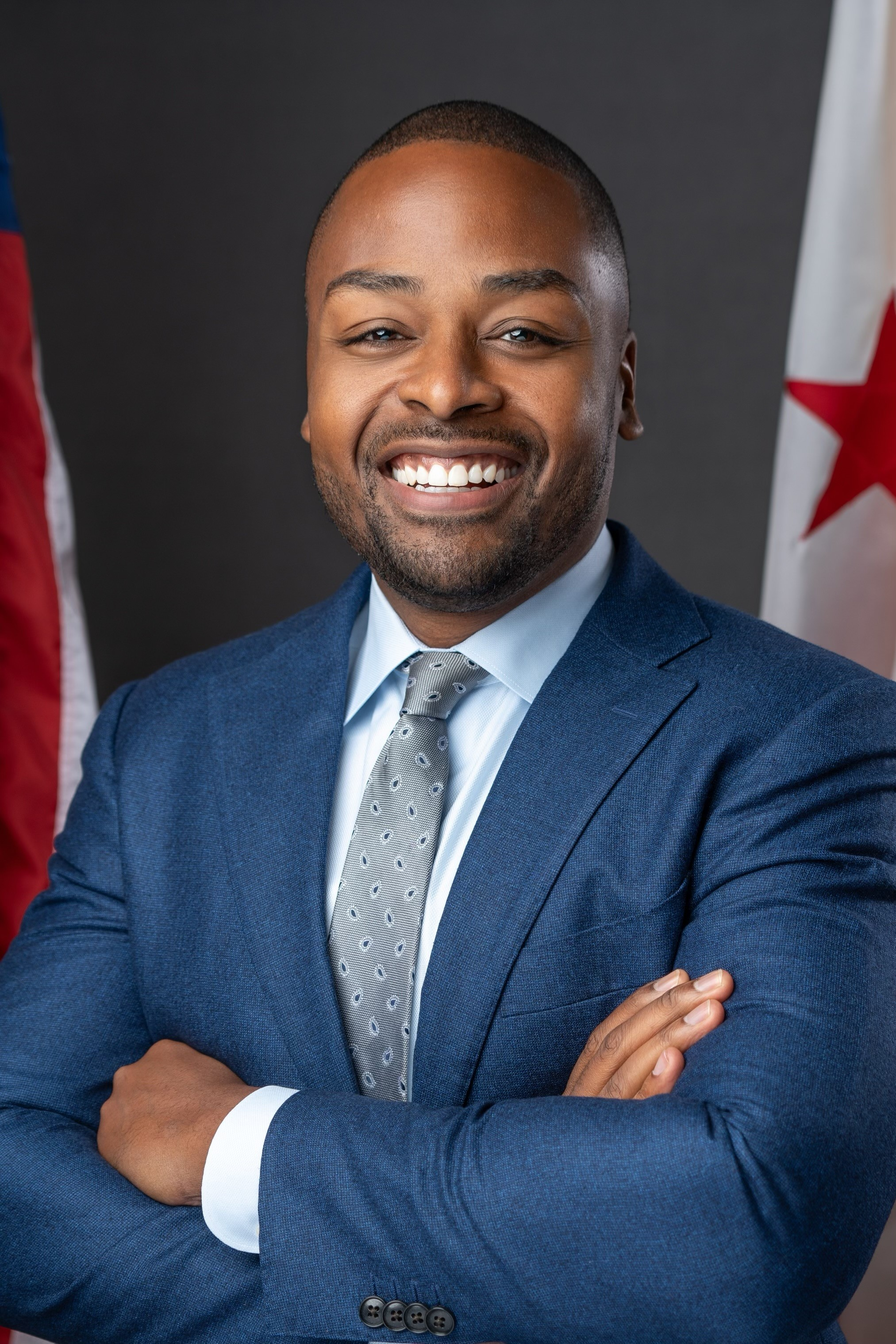
- Official portrait, 2023

Member for the Council of the District of Columbia from Ward 5
- Incumbent
- Assumed office January 2, 2023
- Preceded by: Kenyan McDuffie

Personal details
- Born: 1986 or 1987 (age 39–40) Chicago, Illinois, U.S.
- Party: Democratic
- Education: Northwestern University (BA); Columbia University (MEd)
- Website: Office website Campaign website

Zachary Parker (born 1986/1987) is an educator and American politician, currently serving as a member of the Council of the District of Columbia, representing Ward 5 since January 2023.

== Early life and education ==
Parker was born in Chicago. He received a BS in Speech and Language Pathology from Northwestern University and a MA in Education Policy and Leadership from Columbia University.

== Career ==
Parker worked as a math teacher with Teach for America and won his first election to the State Board of Education Ward 5 seat in 2018. In 2021, Parker served as president of the State Board of Education.

== Council of the District of Columbia ==
Parker was elected to the Council of the District of Columbia during the 2022 election cycle, besting a field of six other candidates which included former councilman Vincent Orange. Parker eventually succeeded Kenyan McDuffie, who was elected to the At-Large council seat. In 2025 Parker was assigned to serve as the Chair of the Committee on Youth Affairs.

=== Ward 5 Day ===
Since taking office, Parker has hosted the annual Ward 5 Day, a community festival celebrating local residents and businesses. The 2025 event at Turkey Thicket Recreation Center featured live music, local food vendors, historical exhibits, and resource tables from community organizations. The celebration also included a "Walk Thru Ward 5" history display, youth entrepreneur fair, and pet adoptions in partnership with Brandywine Valley SPCA, with support from DPR, MedStar Health, and Casey Trees.

== Personal life ==
In 2022, Parker publicly came out as gay in a video statement posted to Twitter, stating his family and community already knew and that he wanted to share his identity publicly.
