= Michigan Park (Washington, D.C.) =

- Neighborhood of Washington, D.C.
- Interactive map of Michigan Park
- Coordinates: 38.9483°N 76.9858°W
- Country: United States
- District: Washington, D.C.
- Ward: Ward 5

Government
  - Councilmember: Zachary Parker
- Postal code: ZIP code

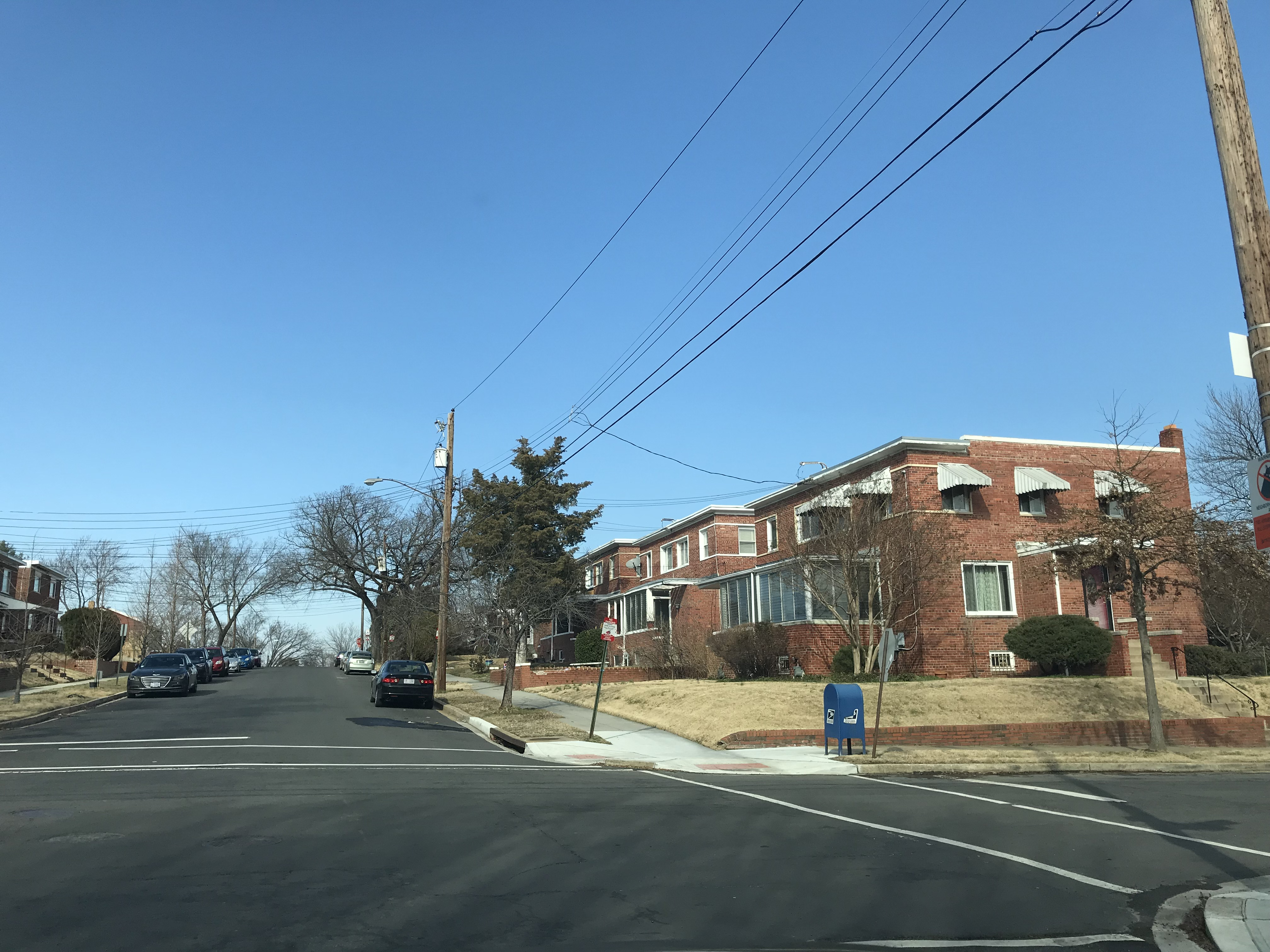
Intersection of 8th St and Crittenden St, NE, Michigan Park, February 2018

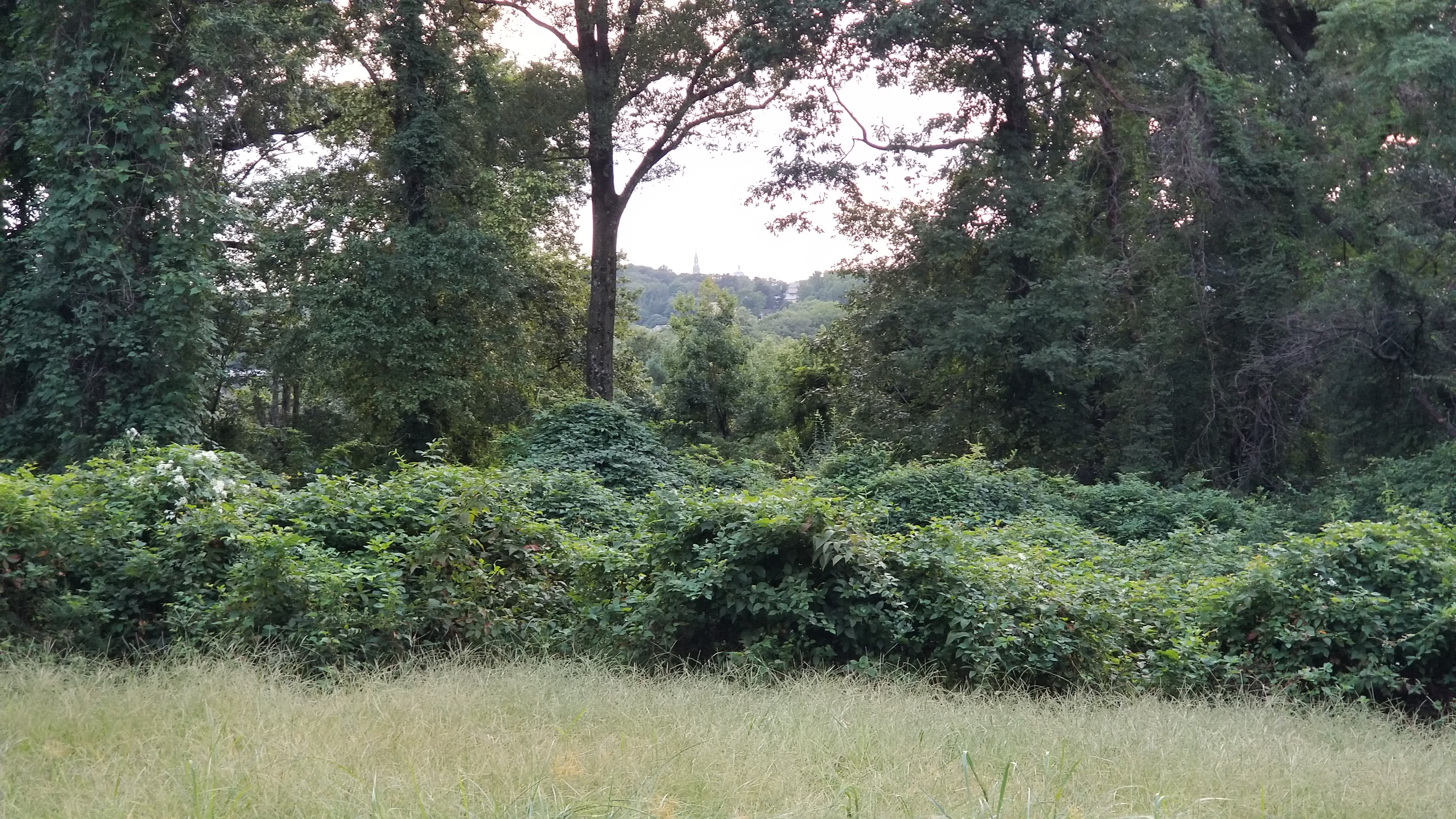
Barnard Hill Park

Michigan Park is a neighborhood in Ward 5 of Northeast Washington, D.C. in the Upper Northeast area element. The boundaries of Michigan Park and North Michigan Park neighborhoods are contested due to the history of racial disparity between the two, but in general Michigan Park is considered to be contained between South Dakota Avenue to the west, Eastern Avenue to the east, Galloway Street NE to the north and Taylor Street NE to the South. Both neighborhoods are in DC Neighborhood Cluster 20 along with the University Heights neighborhood. Michigan Park is home to two established Civic Associations: the North Michigan Park Civic Association which has its established boundaries that include both Michigan Park which includes North Michigan Park are bounded by Taylor Street NE, Michigan Avenue NE, Fort Totten Metro Train Tracks, Gallatin Street NE, Eastern Avenue NE.

Michigan Park is easily accessible by Fort Totten and Brookland-CUA Metro Stations on the Washington Metropolitan Area Red Line.

Michigan Park also has Barnard Hill, a Fort Circle Park named for Major General John G. Barnard, that has excellent views of Upper Northeast.
