= Hilltop =

Hilltop or Hill Top is the top of a hill and may refer to:

== Place names ==
=== United Kingdom ===
- Hill Top, Cumbria, a house in England
- Hill Top, Stanley, County Durham, England
- Hill Top, Teesdale, County Durham, England
- Hilltop, Buckinghamshire

=== United States ===
- Hilltop, Arizona
- Hilltop, the former name of Fuller Acres, California
- Hilltop, Denver, Hilltop (Columbus, Ohio) rado
- Hilltop, Georgia
- Hilltop, Kentucky (disambiguation)
- Hill Top, Maryland
- Hilltop, Minnesota
- Hilltop, Nevada
- Hilltop, Jersey City, New Jersey
- Hilltop, Ohio, a census-designated place in Trumbull County
- Hilltop (Columbus, Ohio), a neighborhood
- Hilltop, Pennsylvania
- Hilltop, South Carolina
- Hilltop, Texas
- Hilltop, Starr County, Texas
- Hill Top, West Virginia
- Hilltop, Tacoma, Washington, a neighborhood
- Fairmede-Hilltop, Richmond, California, commonly referred to as Hilltop
- Hilltop Mall, Richmond, California

=== Lesotho ===
- Hill Top, Qacha's Nek, Lesotho

=== Elsewhere ===
- Hill Top, New South Wales, Australia
- Hilltop, Alberta, Canada
- Hilltop, Manitoba, Canada
- Hilltop, New Zealand, suburb of Taupō

== Arts, entertainment, and media ==
- Hilltop Hoods, an Australian hip-hop group
- "Hilltop", the iconic Coca-Cola commercial by McCann Erikson that introduced the song, "I'd Like to Teach the World to Sing (In Perfect Harmony)"
- Hilltop, a fictional walled community introduced in The Walking Dead (season 6)

== Other uses ==
- Hilltop (Staunton, Virginia), a historic building on the Mary Baldwin University campus
- Hilltop algorithm, an algorithm used to find topic-relevant documents to a particular keyword topic, acquired by Google
- Hilltop F.C., a football club based in Stonebridge, London, England
- Hilltop, an acute care center at the former mental hospital Haverford State Hospital, Haverford Township, Pennsylvania

== See also ==
- Hilltop Manor (disambiguation)
- The Hilltop (disambiguation)
- Hill-topping (disambiguation)
