= List of parishes in the Archdiocese of Washington =

The following is a list of parishes in the Roman Catholic Archdiocese of Washington.

== Montgomery County ==
Parishes of the archdiocese located in Montgomery County, Maryland.

=== Upper Montgomery East Deanery ===
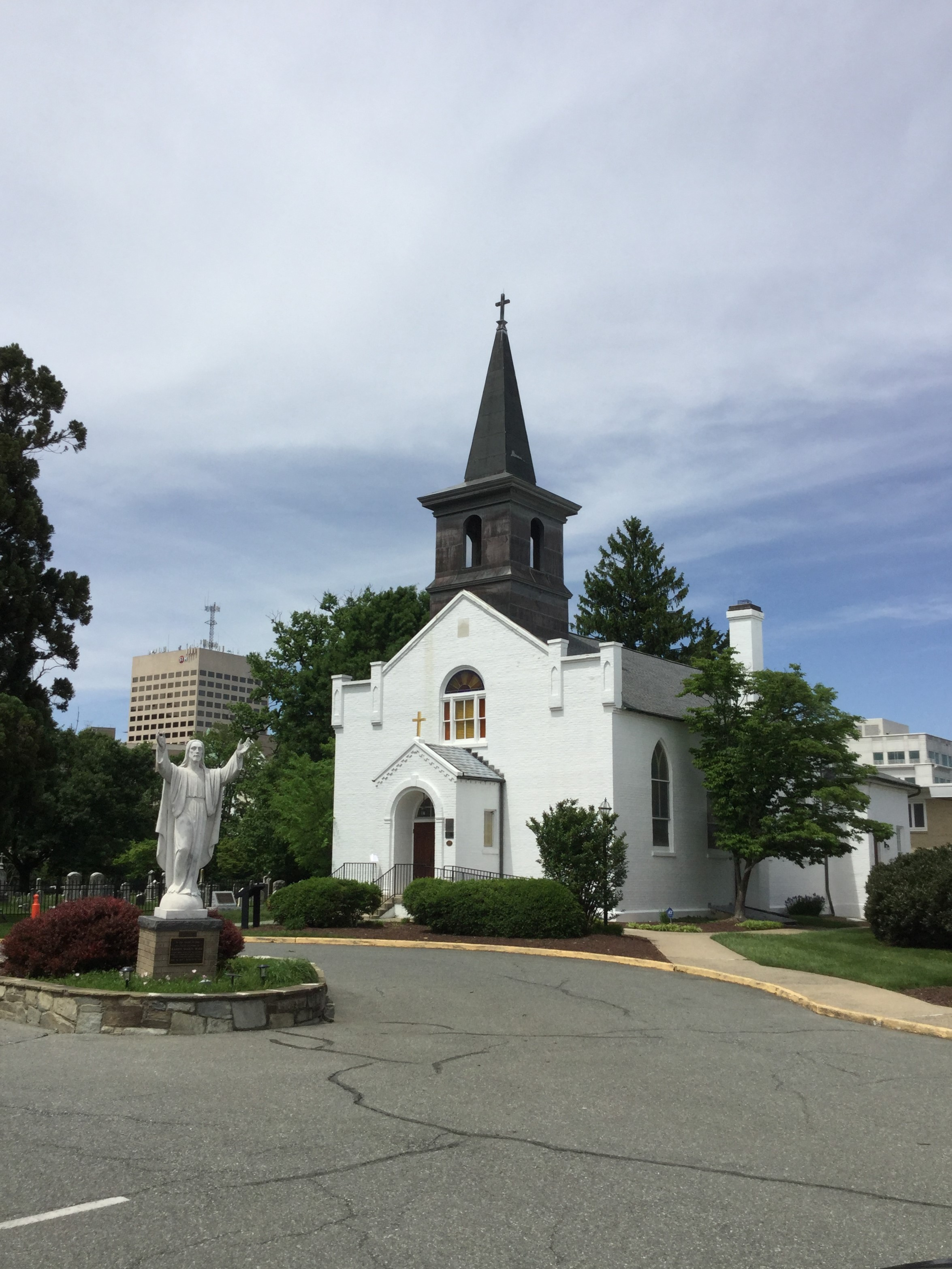
Old St Mary Church, Rockville MD. Built in 1817. 39.082166°N 77.144964°W

Parish	Location	Founded	Map Coordinates
Resurrection	Burtonsville	1981	39.097186°N 76.943586°W
St. Francis of Assisi	Derwood	1972	39.141552°N 77.135429°W
St. Andrew Kim	Olney	1974	39.145254°N 77.050578°W
St. Peter	Olney	1953	39.148525°N 77.062166°W
Shrine of St. Jude	Rockville	1956	39.065139°N 77.096883°W
St. Mary	Rockville	1813	39.081600°N 77.144562°W
Our Lady of China (Pastoral Mission) (Chinese Community)	Rockville	1983	39.081600°N 77.144562°W
St. Patrick	Rockville	1966	39.108494°N 77.082249°W
Misión San Andrés	Silver Spring	1959	39.056262°N 77.049367°W
Our Lady of Grace	Silver Spring	1983	39.112216°N 77.067743°W
Saint Andrew the Apostle	Silver Spring	1959	39.047105°N 77.031283°W
St. Catherine Labouré	Wheaton	1951	39.048318°N 77.068650°W

=== Upper Montgomery West Deanery ===
Parish	Location	Founded	Map Coordinates
St. Mary	Barnesville	1807	39.221058°N 77.380628°W
St. Paul	Damascus	1957	39.283404°N 77.193002°W
Our Lady of the Visitation	Darnestown	1991	39.102787°N 77.294836°W
St. John Neumann	Gaithersburg	1978	39.193992°N 77.186107°W
St. Martin of Tours	Gaithersburg	1920	39.138421°N 77.194362°W
St. Rose of Lima	Gaithersburg	1972	39.150227°N 77.241612°W
Mother Seton	Germantown	1974	39.182952°N 77.273180°W
Our Lady of the Presentation	Poolesville	1992	39.135328°N 77.404768°W

=== Middle Montgomery County Deanery ===
Parish	Location	Founded	Map Coordinates
German Pastoral Mission (Connelly School of the Holy Child)	Bethesda	1992	39.000220°N 77.187652°W
Little Flower	Bethesda	1948	38.961689°N 77.112265°W
Our Lady of Lourdes	Bethesda	1926	38.985317°N 77.091673°W
St. Bartholomew	Bethesda	1960	38.983959°N 77.140594°W
St. Jane Frances de Chantal	Bethesda	1950	39.013253°N 77.116526°W
Holy Cross	Garrett Park	1960	39.033501°N 77.098091°W
Holy Redeemer	Kensington	1948	39.013813°N 77.084784°W
Our Lady of Mercy	Potomac	1959	39.009332°N 77.173272°W
St. Elizabeth	Rockville	1964	39.054421°N 77.136734°W
St. Raphael	Rockville	1966	39.061712°N 77.175873°W

=== Lower Montgomery County Deanery ===
	Parish	Location	Founded	Map Coordinates
	Christ the King	Silver Spring	1961	38.994582°N 77.048585°W
Our Lady Queen of Poland Church side view	Our Lady, Queen of Poland and St. Maximilian Kolbe	Silver Spring	1983	39.016046°N 77.051503°W
	Our Lady of Vietnam	Silver Spring	1990	39.049785°N 76.994408°W
	St. Bernadette	Silver Spring	1948	39.020178°N 77.008787°W
	St. Camillus	Silver Spring	1951	39.009519°N 76.981753°W
	St. John the Baptist	Silver Spring	1960	39.058381°N 76.995516°W
	St. John the Evangelist	Silver Spring	1774	39.022459°N 77.044459°W
	St. Michael the Archangel	Silver Spring	1930	38.996929°N 77.022876°W
	Our Lady of Sorrows	Takoma Park	1932	38.977637°N 76.991178°W

== Prince George’s County ==
Parishes of the archdiocese located in Prince George's County, Maryland.

=== Upper Prince George’s County Deanery ===
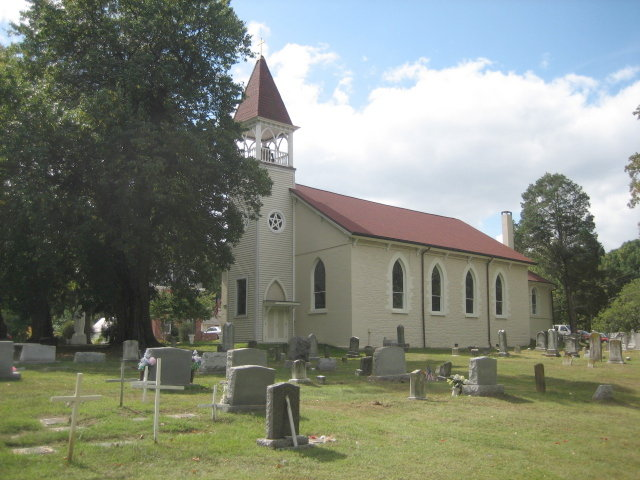
Old Sacred Heart Church, Bowie, MD 38.98304°N 76.71951°W

Parish	Location	Founded	Map Coordinates
St. Joseph	Beltsville	1956	39.036149°N 76.920937°W
Ascension	Bowie	1893	39.006268°N 76.787877°W
Sacred Heart	Bowie	1965	38.983402°N 76.721473°W
St. Edward the Confessor	Bowie	1972	38.914939°N 76.723368°W
St. Pius X	Bowie	1962	38.976187°N 76.750171°W
St. Hugh of Grenoble	Greenbelt	1947	39.004941°N 76.879514°W
St. Matthias the Apostle	Lanham	1961	38.964347°N 76.840831°W
St. Mary of the Mills	Laurel	1843	39.108006°N 76.855919°W
St. Nicholas	Laurel	1967	39.072289°N 76.858635°W

=== Middle Prince George’s County Deanery ===
Parish	Location	Founded	Map Coordinates
St. Ambrose	Cheverly	1949	38.928985°N 76.908225°W
St. John Baptist de La Salle	Chillum	1951	38.960338°N 76.987249°W
Holy Redeemer	College Park	1912	38.994727°N 76.928379°W
St. Jerome	Hyattsville	1886	38.953365°N 76.942763°W
St. Mark the Evangelist	Hyattsville	1958	38.982305°N 76.954433°W
St. Mary	Landover Hills	1960	38.947532°N 76.888307°W
St. Joseph	Largo	1922	38.918075°N 76.843723°W
St. James	Mt. Rainier	1946	38.937986°N 76.958319°W
St. Margaret of Scotland	Seat Pleasant	1908	38.882736°N 76.896769°W
St. Bernard of Clairvaux	Riverdale Park	1948	38.957414°N 76.915518°W
Our Lady of Fatima (Portuguese Community)	Riverdale Park	1999	38.957414°N 76.915518°W

=== Lower Prince George’s County Deanery ===
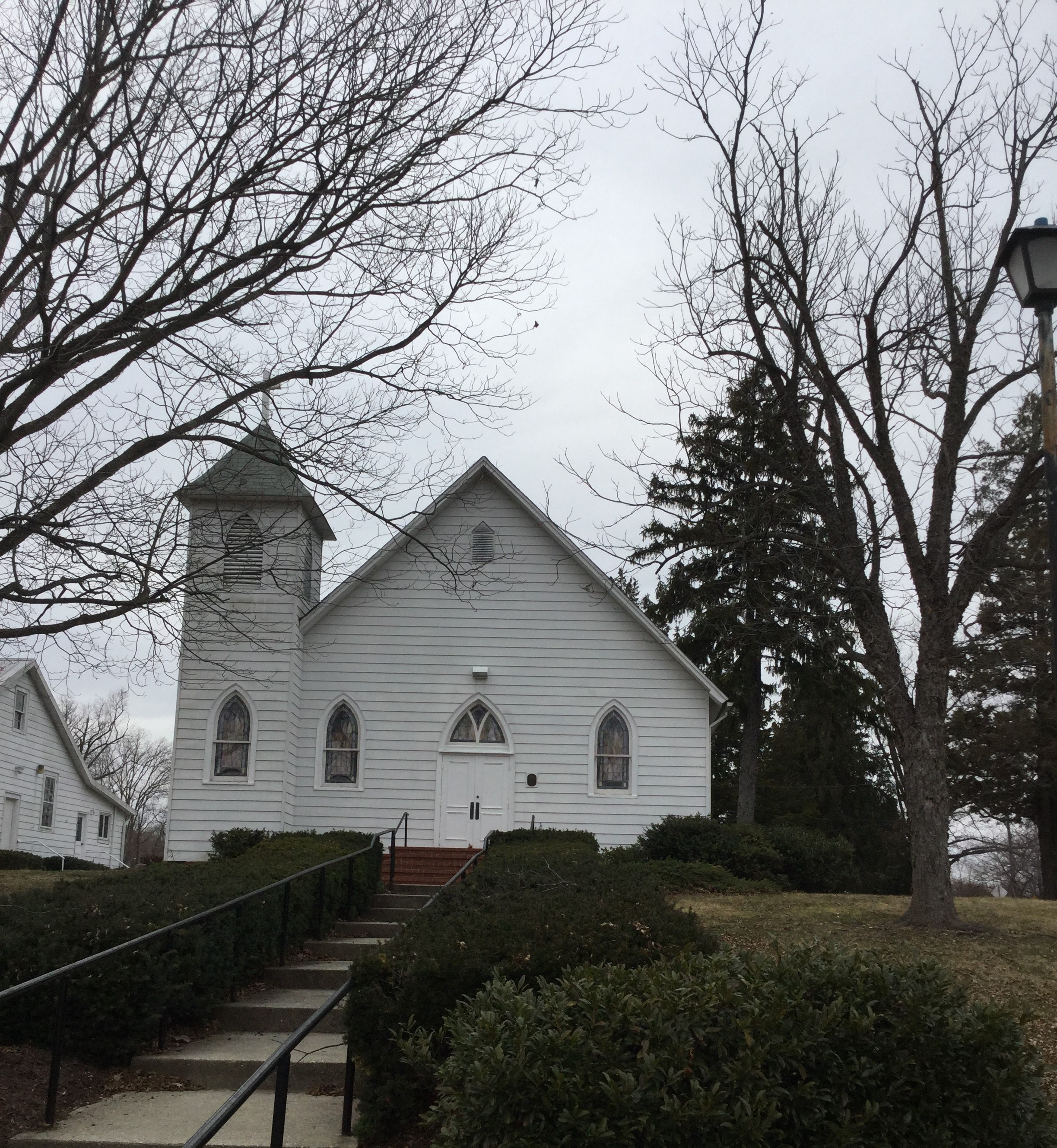
Front view of Old Most Holy Rosary Church, Rosaryville, MD 38.756985°N 76.811449°W

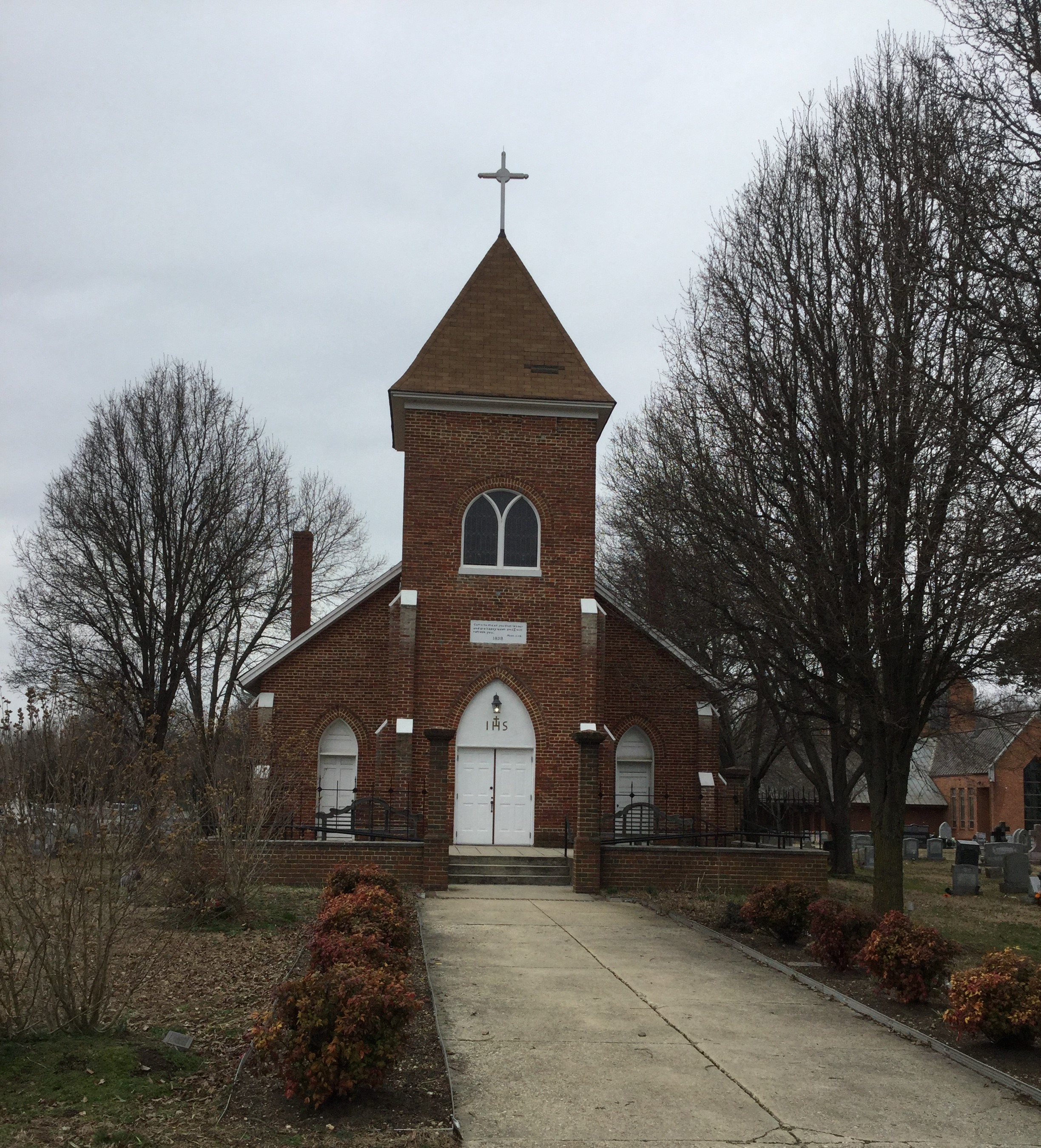
Front view of Old St Mary Church, Piscataway, MD 38.704375°N 76.967066°W

Parish	Location	Founded	Map Coordinates
St. Philip the Apostle	Camp Springs	1957	38.822040°N 76.912950°W
St. John the Evangelist	Clinton	1875	38.767344°N 76.898138°W
St. Mary, Piscataway	Clinton	1830	38.704982°N 76.967892°W
Holy Spirit	Forestville	1966	38.867129°N 76.863518°W
Mount Calvary	Forestville	1942	38.852397°N 76.890598°W
Holy Family	Hillcrest Heights	1952	38.835862°N 76.965253°W
Holy Family	Mitchellville	1938	38.922774°N 76.796798°W
St. Ignatius	Oxon Hill	1849	38.804485°N 76.966669°W
St. Columba	Oxon Hill	1960	38.783699°N 76.991085°W
Most Holy Rosary	Rosaryville	1966	38.749159°N 76.804868°W
St. Bernardine of Siena	Suitland	1966	38.857797°N 76.920259°W
St. Mary of the Assumption	Upper Marlboro	1824	38.818677°N 76.748152°W

== Southern Maryland ==
Parishes of the archdiocese located in Calvert County, Charles County, and St. Mary's County of Southern Maryland.

=== Calvert County Deanery ===
Parish	Location	Founded	Map Coordinates
Jesus the Divine Word	Huntingtown	1994	38.610723°N 76.594148°W
St. Anthony	North Beach	1962	38.703254°N 76.533658°W
Jesus the Good Shepherd	Owings	1985	38.709016°N 76.638141°W
St. John Vianney	Prince Frederick	1965	38.537595°N 76.580676°W
Our Lady Star of the Sea	Solomons	1888	38.324649°N 76.458659°W

=== Charles County Deanery ===
Parish	Location	Founded	Map Coordinates
St. Dominic	Aquasco	1974	38.581861°N 76.723854°W
St. Michael	Baden	1957	38.649774°N 76.770322°W
St. Francis de Sales	Benedict	1903	38.514441°N 76.679040°W
St. Mary	Bryantown	1793	38.539452°N 76.837188°W
St. Ignatius	Chapel Point	1641 (c.)	38.465522°N 77.023855°W
St. Ignatius of Loyola	Hilltop	1851	38.483943°N 77.140641°W
St. Mary, Star of the Sea	Indian Head	1901	38.596054°N 77.167594°W
Holy Ghost	Issue	1904	38.299068°N 76.880452°W
Sacred Heart	La Plata	1755	38.526222°N 76.978855°W
St. Catherine of Alexandria	McConchie	1911	38.502587°N 77.058458°W
St. Mary	Newport	1674	38.433720°N 76.909659°W
St. Joseph	Pomfret	1763	38.586694°N 77.024245°W
Our Lady Help of Christians	Waldorf	1980	38.602674°N 76.898308°W
St. Peter	Waldorf	1700	38.620057°N 76.861267°W

=== St. Mary’s County Deanery ===
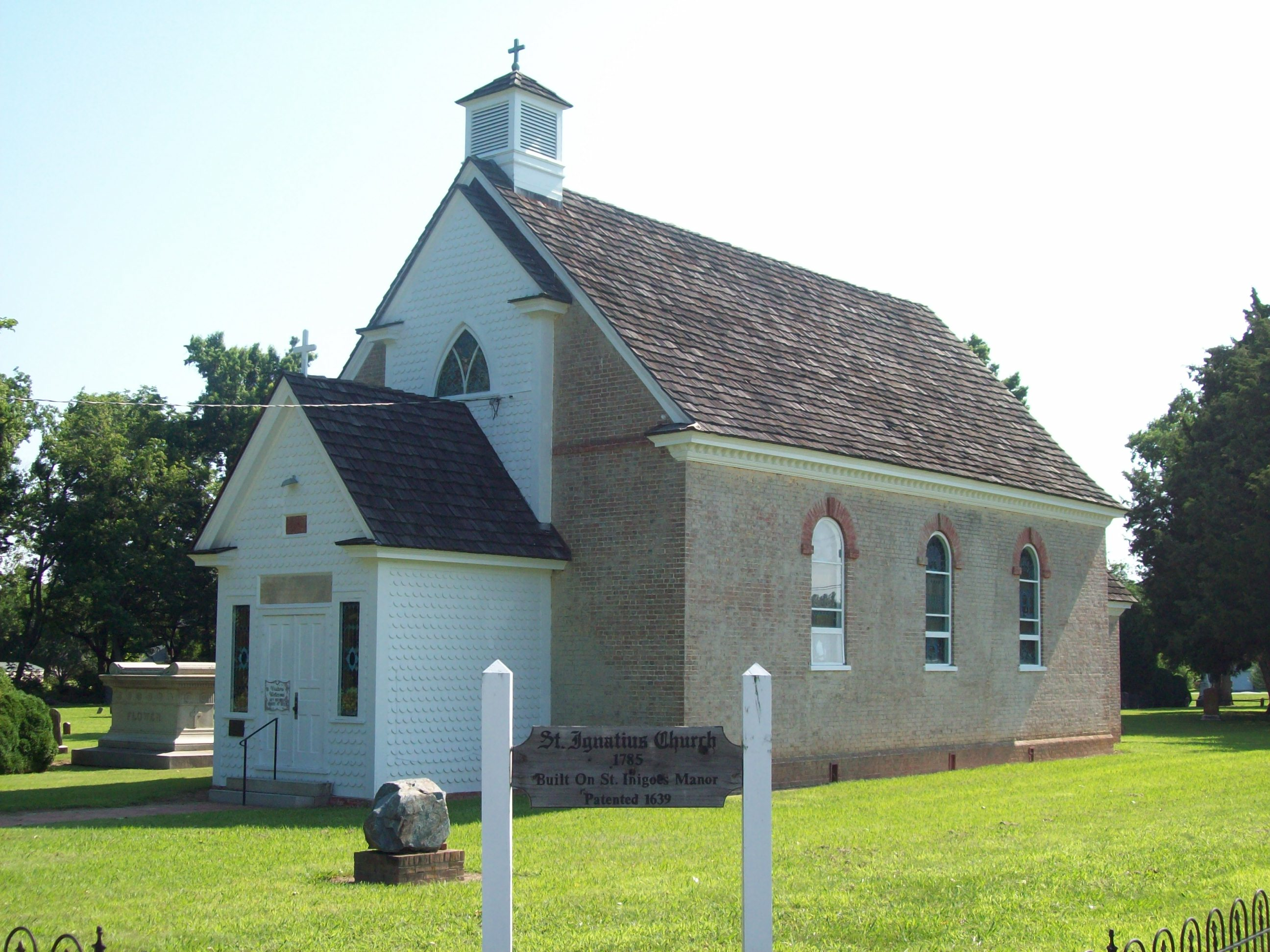
Historic St. Ignatius, located in St. Inigoes, St. Mary's County, Maryland, was the First Catholic parish in English speaking North America. 38.150327°N 76.423943°W

Parish	Location	Founded	Map Coordinates
Holy Angels	Avenue	1906	38.254756°N 76.768398°W
Sacred Heart	Bushwood	1755	38.302415°N 76.792218°W
Our Lady of the Wayside	Chaptico	1938	38.367196°N 76.777396°W
Holy Face	Great Mills	1879	38.239203°N 76.509159°W
St. John Francis Regis	Hollywood	1690	38.332558°N 76.559112°W
St. Aloysius	Leonardtown	1710	38.294658°N 76.635027°W
Immaculate Heart of Mary	Lexington Park	1947	38.280683°N 76.472482°W
Immaculate Conception	Mechanicsville	1876	38.442831°N 76.748233°W
Our Lady’s Church at Medley’s Neck	Medley’s Neck	1776	38.261122°N 76.620520°W
St. Joseph	Morganza	1700	38.375978°N 76.696992°W
St. Francis Xavier	Newtowne	1640	38.255698°N 76.700042°W
St. Michael	Ridge	1890	38.121551°N 76.367045°W
St. Peter Claver	St. Inigoes	1952	38.131517°N 76.381721°W
St. Cecilia	St. Mary’s City	1975	38.191053°N 76.416890°W
St. George	Valley Lee	1851	38.194954°N 76.503304°W

== Washington, D.C. ==
Parishes of the archdiocese located in Washington, D.C.

=== Northwest-East Deanery ===
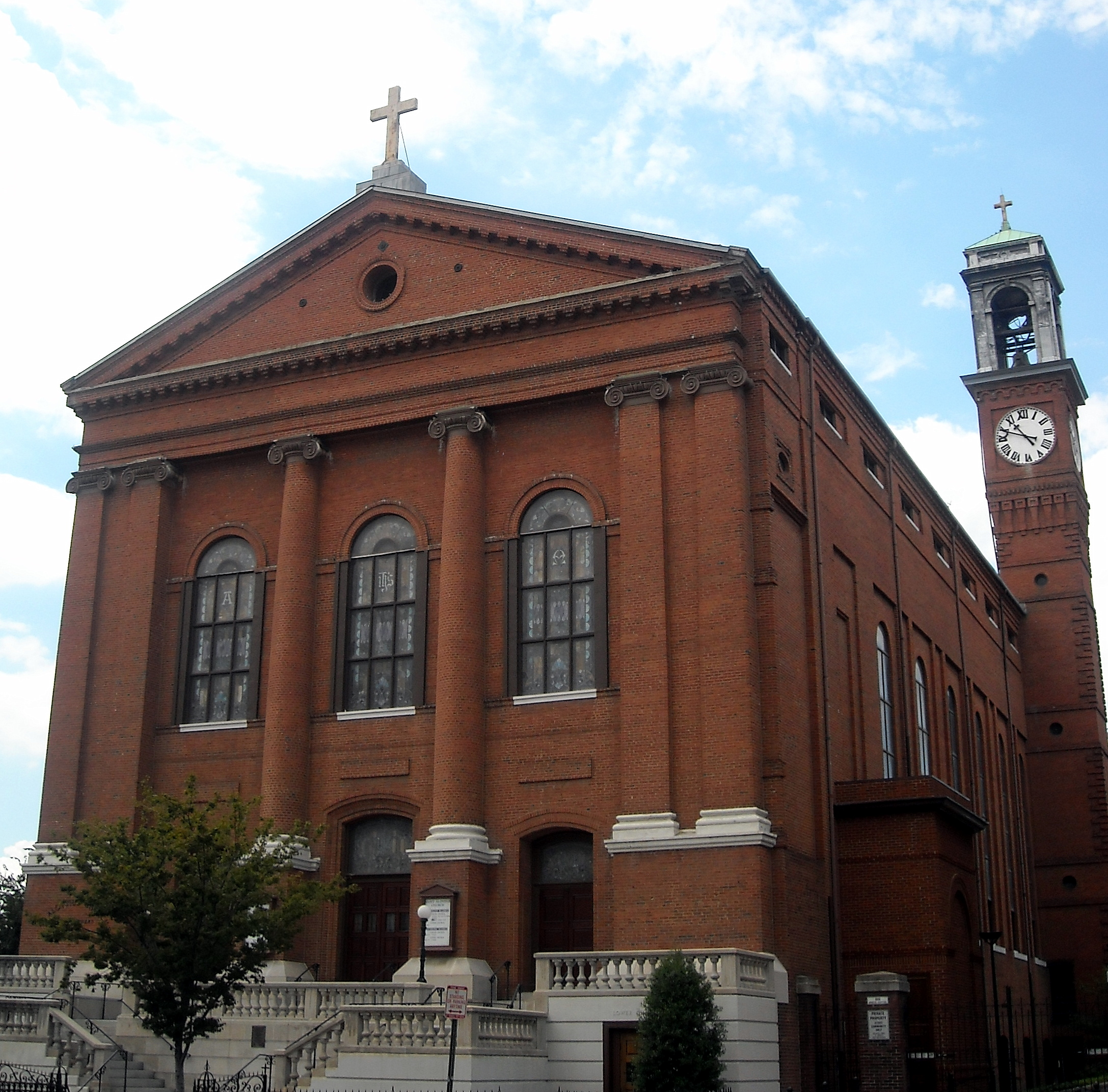
St. Aloysius was a parish church from 1859 until 2012 when it was merged with Holy Redeemer parish. 38.901559°N 77.009452°W

Parish	Founded	Map Coordinates
Holy Redeemer	1922	38.905339°N 77.014175°W
Holy Rosary	1913	38.897583°N 77.015036°W
Immaculate Conception	1864	38.907398°N 77.022583°W
Nativity	1901	38.963225°N 77.029088°W
St. Augustine	1865	38.918341°N 77.034254°W
St. Gabriel	1920	38.943728°N 77.020003°W
St. Martin of Tours	1801	38.915779°N 77.009330°W
St. Mary, Mother of God	1845	38.899362°N 77.018749°W
St. Patrick	1794	38.897921°N 77.025811°W

=== Northwest-West Deanery ===
Parish	Founded	Map Coordinates
Annunciation	1948	38.930191°N 77.075766°W
Blessed Sacrament	1911	38.968386°N 77.075413°W
Cathedral of St. Matthew	1840	38.906224°N 77.040129°W
Epiphany	1925	38.907579°N 77.056438°W
Holy Trinity	1791	38.907175°N 77.070122°W
Our Lady, Queen of the Americas	1985	38.915845°N 77.049173°W
Our Lady of Victory	1910	38.916283°N 77.094899°W
St. Blaise (Pastoral Mission) (Croatian Community)		38.916283°N 77.094899°W
Sacred Heart	1911	38.931175°N 77.035910°W
St. Ann	1869	38.946567°N 77.079283°W
St. Louis de France	1978	38.956201°N 77.081804°W
St. Stephen, Martyr	1867	38.903307°N 77.053050°W
St. Thomas the Apostle	1913	38.925986°N 77.055046°W

=== Northeast Deanery ===
Parish	Founded	Map Coordinates
Holy Comforter-St. Cyprian	1893	38.889558°N 76.986046°W
Holy Name	1892	38.901905°N 76.991706°W
St. Anthony of Padua	1892	38.932290°N 76.991200°W
St. Benedict the Moor	1946	38.893865°N 76.975304°W
St. Dominic	1852	38.882954°N 77.020264°W
St. Francis de Sales	1722	38.929141°N 76.975546°W
St. Joseph's on Capitol Hill	1868	38.893812°N 77.003339°W
St. Peter's on Capitol Hill	1820	38.885825°N 77.003760°W
St. Vincent de Paul	1903	38.876692°N 77.008835°W
Kidane-Mehret Ge’ez Rite Catholic Church (Ethiopian Community)		38.876692°N 77.008835°W

=== Southeast Deanery ===
Parish	Founded	Map Coordinates
Assumption	1916	38.841103°N 77.004015°W
Incarnation	1925	38.901564°N 76.920739°W
Our Lady, Queen of Peace	1948	38.883020°N 76.947909°W
Our Lady of Perpetual Help	1920	38.857396°N 76.982325°W
St. Francis Xavier	1924	38.872409°N 76.967353°W
St. Luke	1957	38.889378°N 76.930805°W
St. Teresa of Avila	1879	38.865570°N 76.987743°W
St. Thomas More	1952	38.825445°N 77.000027°W
