= Hill Top, County Durham =

There are two places in County Durham called Hill Top:

- Hill Top, Stanley, near Stanley, County Durham
- Hill Top, Teesdale
