= Annunciation Catholic Church =

Annunciation Catholic Church may refer to:

- Annunciation Catholic Church (Washington, D.C.)
- Church of the Annunciation (Minneapolis)

== See also ==
- St. Mary of the Annunciation Catholic Church (disambiguation)
- Annunciation Church (disambiguation)
