= Hilltop Manor =

Hilltop Manor may refer to:

- Hilltop Manor (Bladensburg, Maryland), listed on the National Register of Historic Places (NRHP)
- Hilltop Manor (The Cavalier Apartment Building), NRHP-listed in Washington, D.C.

== See also ==
- Hilltop (disambiguation)
- Hilltop Lodge, a historic motel in Albuquerque, New Mexico
