= Hill-topping =

Hill topping may refer to:

- Hill-topping (biology), a mate-location behaviour seen in many insects including butterflies, dragonflies, wasps, beetles, and flies
- Hill jumping, the act of accelerating a motor vehicle as it approaches the top of a hill, causing the vehicle to go airborne
- Hilltopping, a fox hunt by horse but without jumping or in an automobile

== See also ==
- Hilltop (disambiguation)
