= Edgewood (Washington, D.C.) =

- Neighborhood of Washington, D.C.
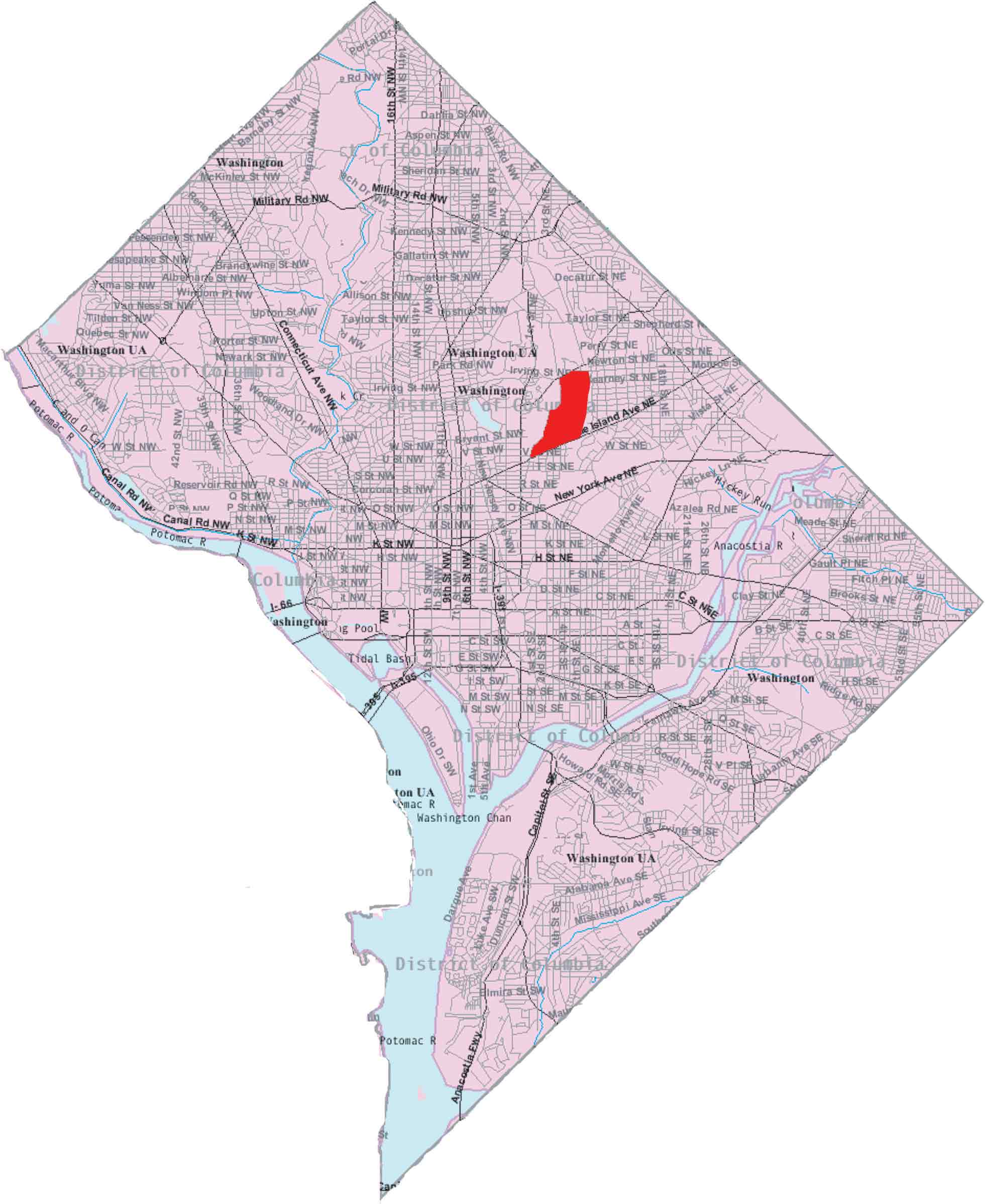
- Edgewood within the District of Columbia
- Coordinates: 38.9226°N 77.0005°W
- Country: United States
- District: Washington, D.C.
- Ward: Ward 5

Government
  - Councilmember: Kenyan McDuffie
- Postal code: ZIP code

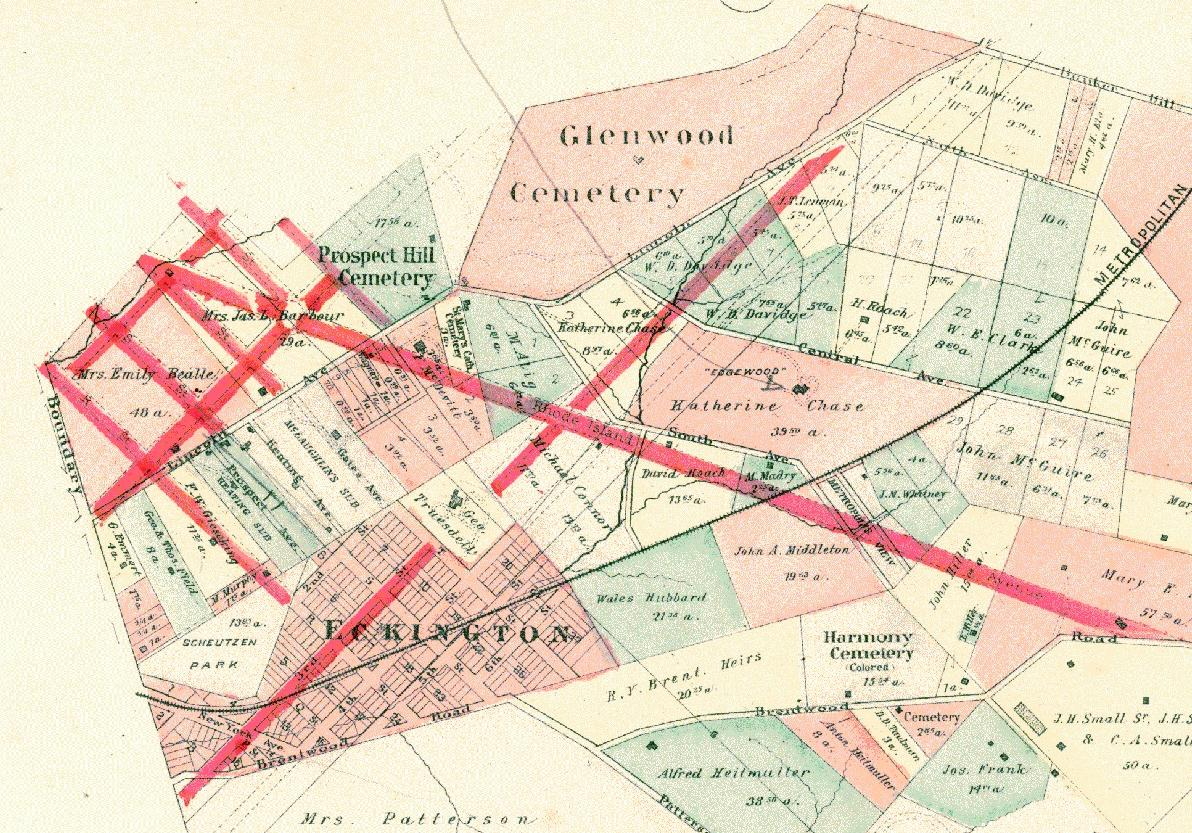
Edgewood Estate, 1887

Edgewood is a neighborhood located in Ward 5 of Northeast Washington, D.C. Edgewood is bounded by Michigan Avenue NE to the north, Rhode Island Avenue NE to the south, North Capitol Street to the west, and the Washington Metro's Red Line to the east. The eastern boundary originates with the establishment of the former Metropolitan Branch of the Baltimore and Ohio Railroad in 1873, creating the physical barrier which today separates Edgewood from Brookland to the east.

== History ==
=== 19th century ===
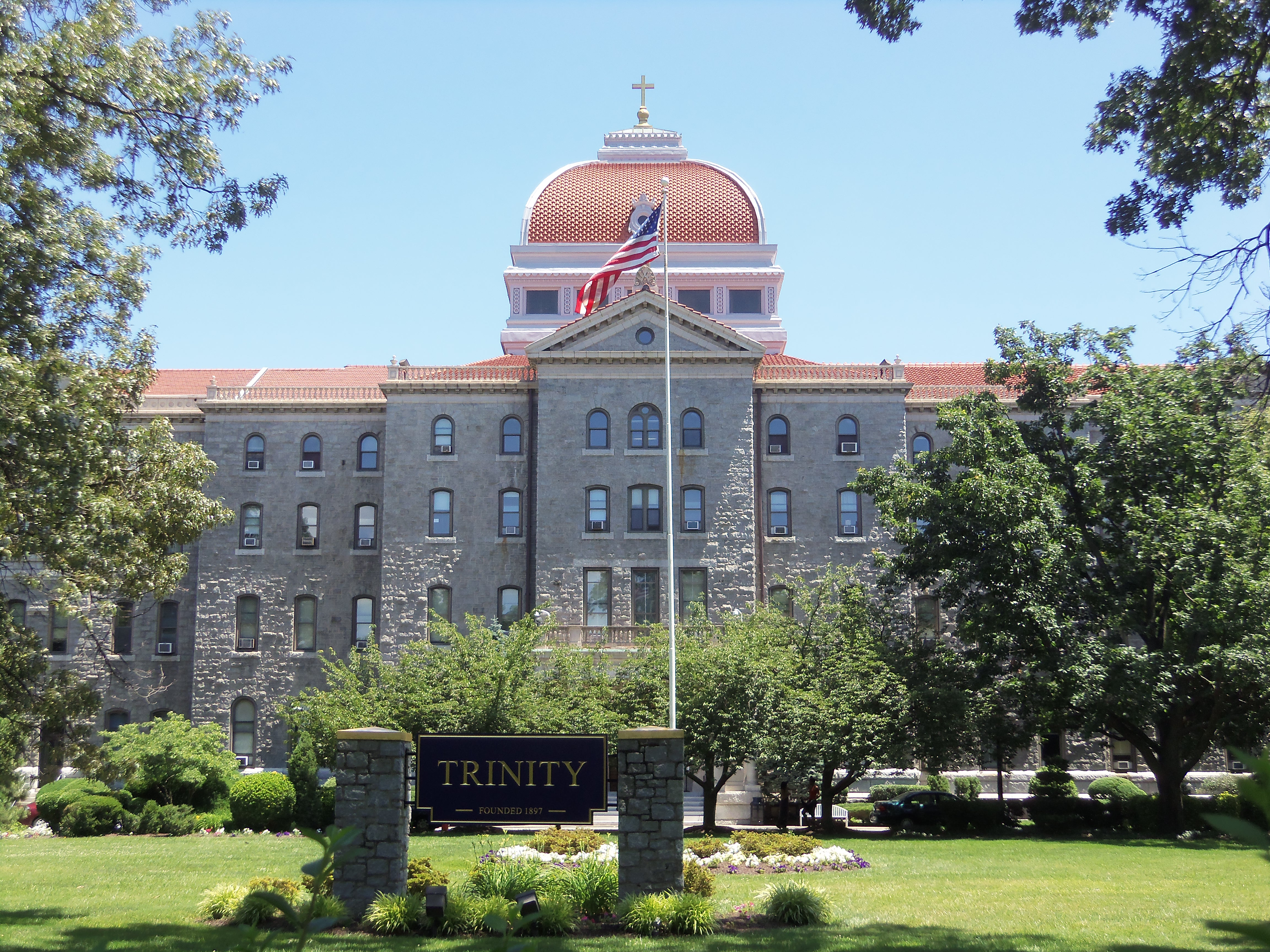
Trinity Washington University along Michigan Avenue

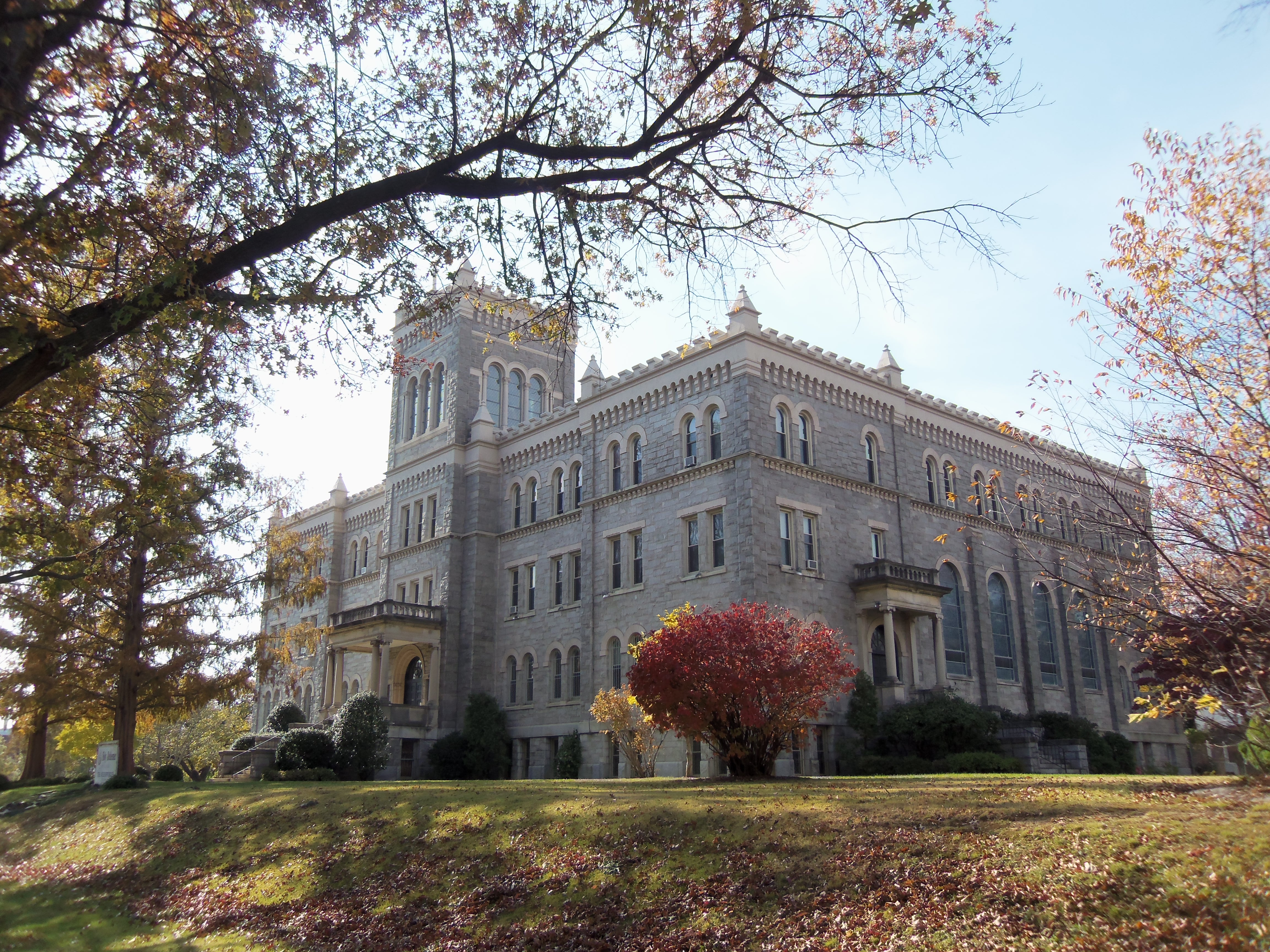
Holy Redeemer College

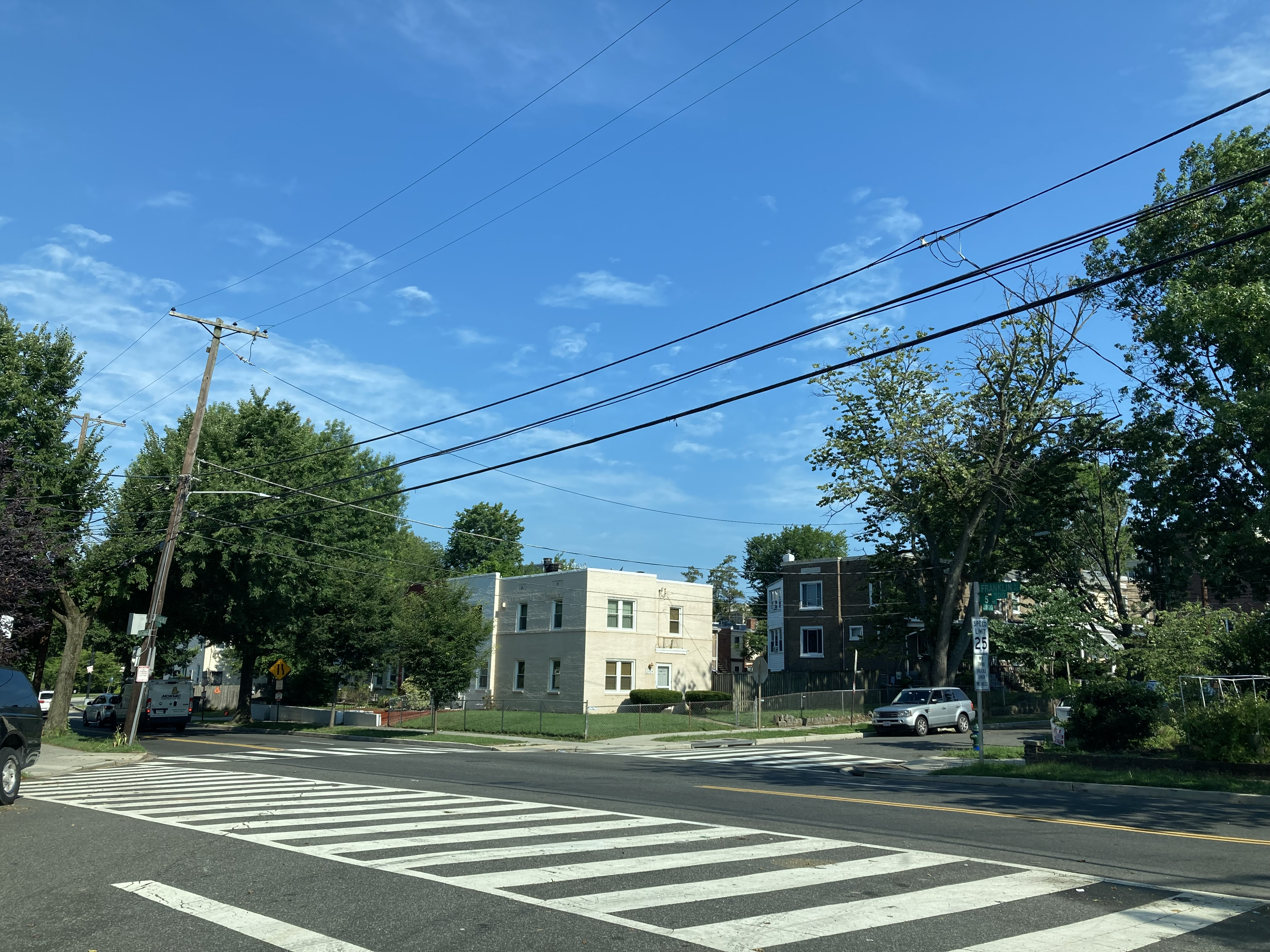
Intersection of Franklin St. and 5th St. NE, in Edgewood, July 2021

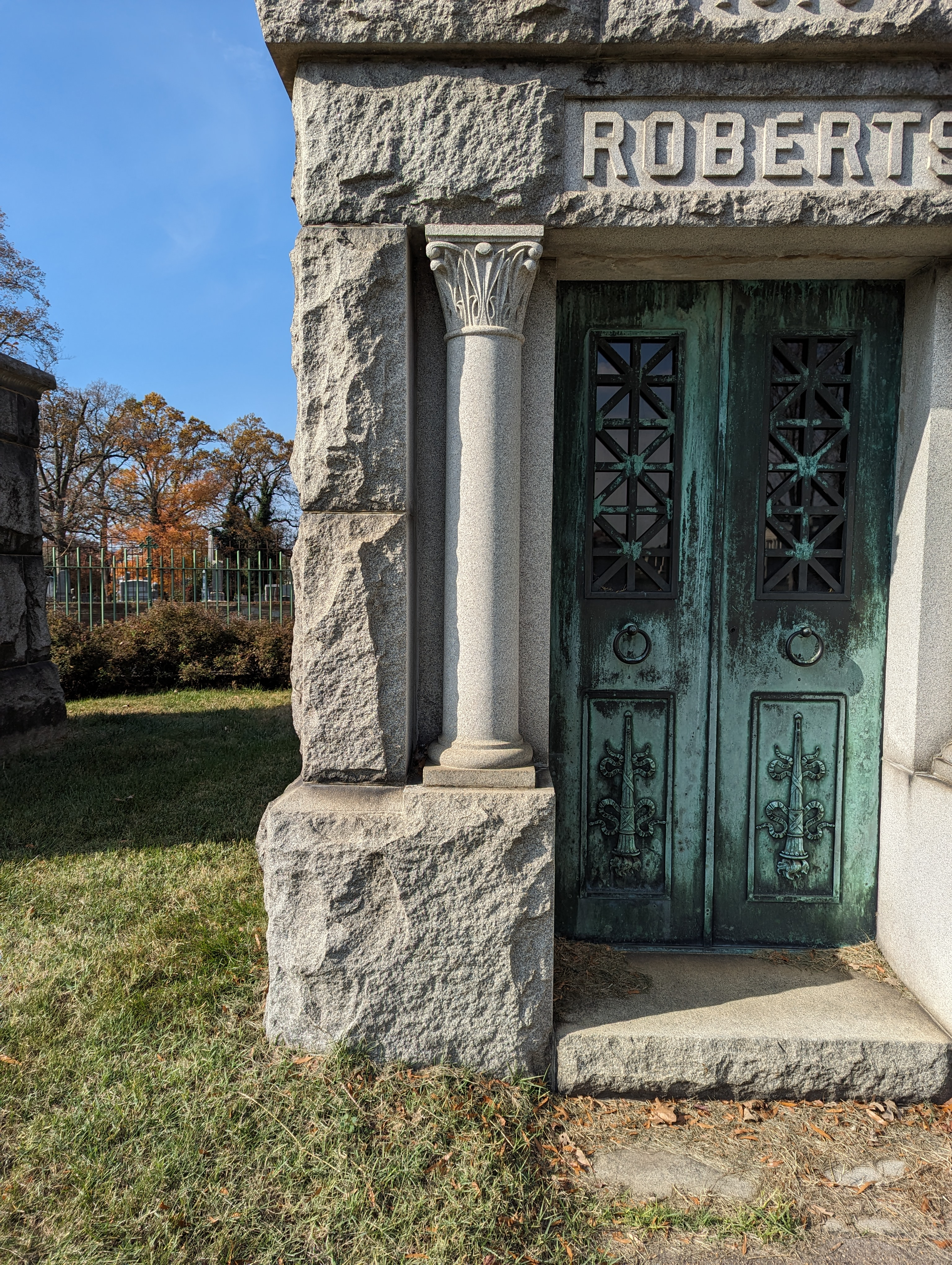
A mausoleum in Saint Mary's Catholic Cemetery in Edgewood

What is today the neighborhood of Edgewood derives its name from the “Edgewood” estate of Salmon P. Chase. Appointed by President Abraham Lincoln, Chase served as U.S. Treasury Secretary from 1861 to 1864. During this period, Chase purchased part of a 30-acre (120,000 m^{2}) plot called Metropolis View as well as another 20 acres (81,000 m^{2}) of nearby land. Here, he built an estate at what is now 4th and Edgewood Streets NE and named the newly expanded property Edgewood, with building completed in 1865.

Following his time at the Department of Treasury, Lincoln also appointed him to serve as Chief Justice of the United States, where he presided until his death in 1873. Upon his passing, Chase's will left his estate equally to his two daughters – Katherine Chase Sprague and Janet Ralston “Nettie” Chase Hoyt. Nettie, happily married to William Sprague Hoyt since 1871 and financially well-off at the time, had no interest in the property. She later sold her share to her sister for $16,875 (at six percent interest), making Kate the estate's sole owner.

The combination of her father's death, the Panic of 1873, and her divorce from William Sprague in 1882 put Kate into dire financial straits and unable to maintain Edgewood. By the 1890s, in an effort to make the estate a going concern, she grew vegetables and raised chickens on the grounds – even delivering eggs into Washington in her own carriage. This approach proved unsuccessful, as the estate required near constant upkeep. Washington Loan and Trust, which held the mortgage on Edgewood, attempted to auction the estate's effects in January 1895 to recover outstanding amounts due on the loan. The company did succeed in partially emptying the estate's contents before Kate could secure a stay; however, within six months, the bank foreclosed on the estate – giving Kate until February 1, 1896, to bring her account current.

Seeking financial assistance, Kate left Washington to enlist help from old friends and past admirers of her father. She first traveled to her home state of Ohio, and, when that proved futile, she went to New York. There, she sought to secure funds for Edgewood under the guise of preserving it as “a historic landmark in appreciation of the value of her father’s public service.” She endeavored to persuaded Henry Villard – a powerful journalist and financier from the Chases’ past – to arrange a group of donors to support the estate. Villard obliged because he remembered Kate fondly for her generosity to him early in his career. In addition to Villard, backers included notable individuals like J. P. Morgan (of today's JPMorgan Chase, for whom Kate's father is a partial, historical namesake), Collis Potter Huntington, and Levi P. Morton. The group established a trust fund in the amount of $80,000, which was sufficient to bring Edgewood out of foreclosure and to provide Kate a small stipend for a few years until the estate could be sold for a profit.

Hardship and poverty eventually got the better of Kate before she could realize these plans for the dilapidated estate. On the morning of July 31, 1899, she died at age 58 of what was then called Bright's disease. Kate's daughters Ethel and Portia subsequently shuttered Edgewood, and went back to their respective homes in Brooklyn and Narragansett Pier.

=== 20th century ===
In 1900, having outgrown its original 10th and G location, St. Vincent's Orphan Asylum for Girls purchased Edgewood and moved operations to the vacant estate. As a Catholic organization, this was a logical choice given the property's considerable acreage and its proximity to the Catholic University of America (Catholic University). The orphanage's final decades saw a precipitous decline in the number of girls served, with only girls between the ages of six and twelve being accepted by 1959. Interestingly, while St. Vincent's possible population was limited by age, the orphanage was notable for being racially integrated – though there were few African-American girls. In 1968, the orphanage ceased operations, with Edgewood being its final home.

The mansion was eventually razed in the proceeding years. The vast majority of the land that was occupied by the estate's grounds became what is now Edgewood Commons, formerly known as Edgewood Terrace, and Rhode Island Avenue Shopping Center, a large complex of mixed-income and senior citizen public housing, opened in 1972.

== Catholic institutions ==
Edgewood, together with its surrounding neighborhoods, has been at times referred to as "Little Rome" because of the many Catholic organizations and institutions clustered around Catholic University. The university itself does not lie within Edgewood's borders, but since the Catholic Church purchased the Middletown estate, adjacent to Edgewood, in 1887, many Catholic groups have established themselves there and in the neighboring communities of Brookland and Michigan Park. Ordered by year of establishment, major Catholic organizations that are physically located in Edgewood include:

- Trinity Washington University (1897)
- Priory of the Immaculate Conception (1905)
- St. Paul's College (1914)
- Discalced Carmelites Friars – Washington Province (1916)
- Catholic University Theological College (1917)
- Holy Redeemer College (1933)
- United States Conference of Catholic Bishops (1966)

== Landmarks ==
- Edgewood Wall is part of Open Walls DC, a public art initiative that provides spaces and walls for graffiti artists, street artists, muralists, art students, emerging and established artists who love to paint outdoors and large. The goal of Open Walls DC is to create large ever-changing murals that beautify our city and are unusual creative public spaces.
- Glenwood Cemetery
- Greater Mount Calvary Holy Church
- St. Mary's Cemetery
- Basilica of the National Shrine of the Immaculate Conception

== Businesses ==
"In November 2011, D.C. based real estate developer Abdo broke ground on a large mixed-use development spread over a previously underutilized 8.9-acre plot. The project, known as Monroe Street Market, was fully completed in 2014. Despite the word "BROOKLAND" prominently painted on the main building, the entire complex lies within Edgewood. This area includes 27 artists' studios on an "Arts Walk" and commercial businesses & restaurants. While there are future projects slated, at least part of the community believes the area is being overly developed, which has led to a few court battles with developers.

== Transportation ==
Edgewood does not have a dedicated Metro station within its borders. Given that the neighborhood's eastern boundary is the Washington Metro's Red Line, Edgewood is served by the Brookland–CUA station and the Rhode Island Avenue–Brentwood station. The latter was one of Metro's original six stations opened on March 29, 1976.

The Metropolitan Branch Trail travels through Edgewood on its way from the transit center in Silver Spring, Maryland to Washington Union Station in the NoMa neighborhood. There are three entry/exit points within Edgewood at the following locations (north to south):

- 800 block of Michigan Avenue, NE
- 2800 block of Edgewood Street, NE
- 700 block of Rhode Island Avenue, NE (elevated)

== Gallery ==
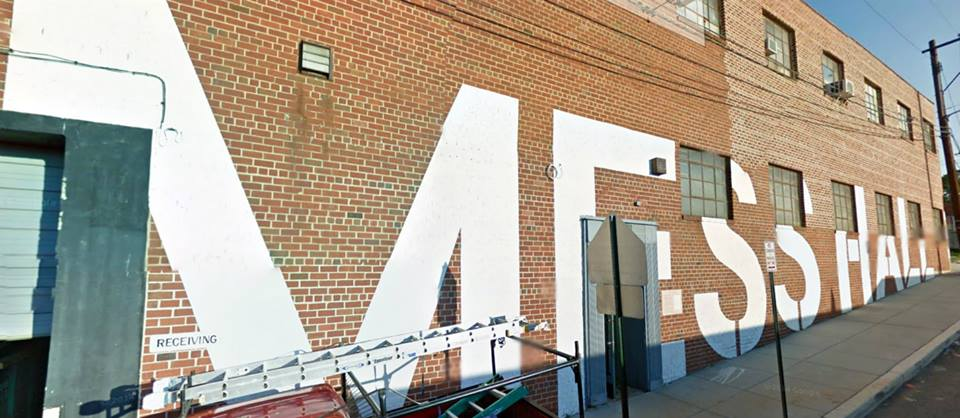
Mess Hall

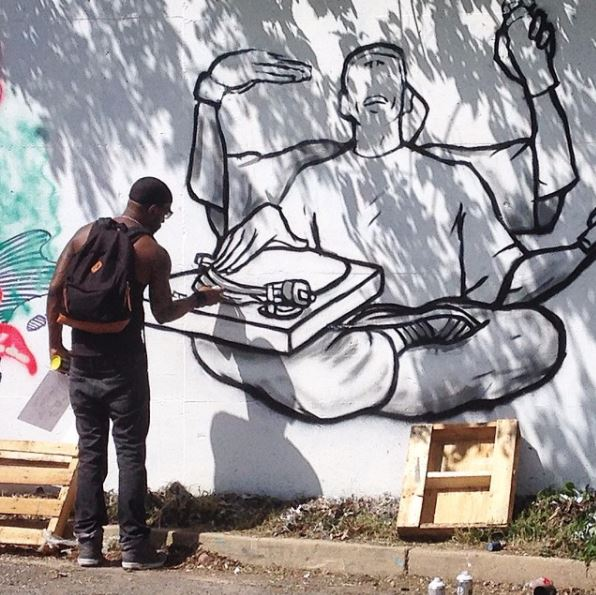
Edgewood Wall

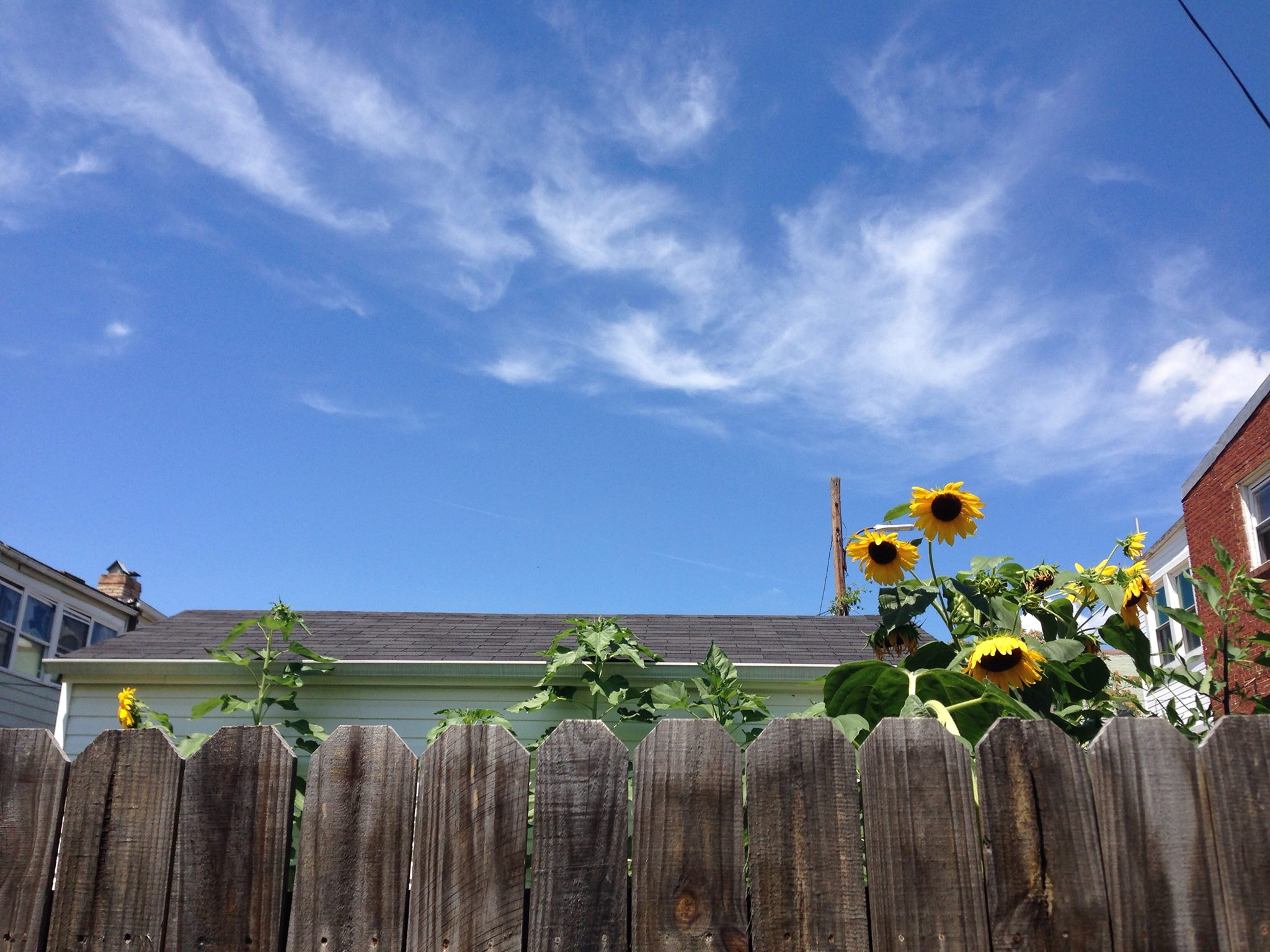
Sunflowers on Douglas St. NE in Edgewood

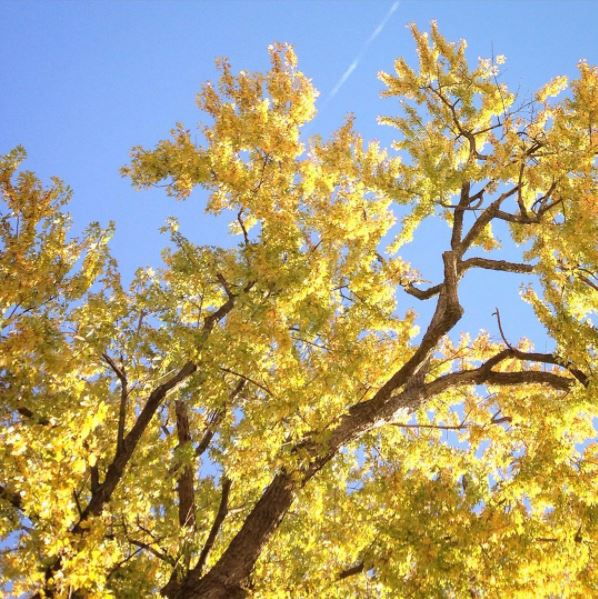
Fall foliage in Edgewood
