= Hill Top, Kentucky =

Hill Top, Kentucky or Hilltop, Kentucky may refer to:

- Hill Top, Fleming County, Kentucky
- Hill Top, McCreary County, Kentucky
- Hill Top, Menifee County, Kentucky
- Hilltop, Kentucky
