= Holy Redeemer College =

- U.S. National Register of Historic Places
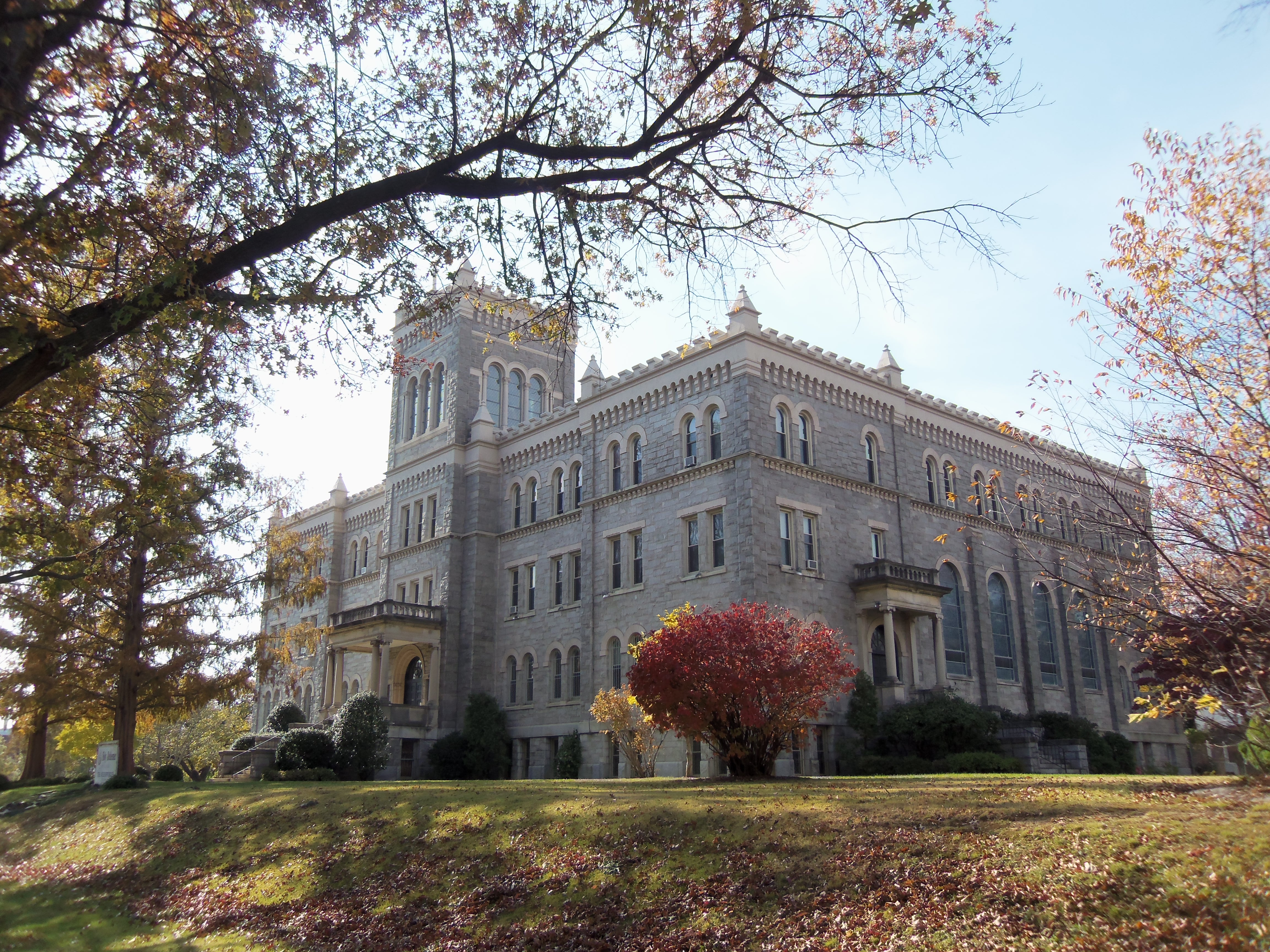

- Location within District of Columbia
- Location: 3112 Seventh St. NE; Washington, D.C.
- Coordinates: 38°55′43.7″N 76°59′48.1″W
- NRHP reference No.: 100003958
- Added to NRHP: May 17, 2019

Holy Redeemer College is a Roman Catholic institution that provides housing to priests and religious brothers who are pursuing studies in Washington, D.C. Located at 3112 7th Street, NE in the city's Brookland neighborhood, it is run by the Baltimore Province of the Congregation of the Most Holy Redeemer, better known as the Redemptorists. The college's proximity to several other Catholic institutions means that it is part of the Edgewood, Brookland, Michigan Park area sometimes referred to as "Little Rome".

Despite its name, "college" does not represent the modern educational definition but rather the more classical definition. Here, "college" is related to the Latin word collegium, meaning "collection", which is often used in the Catholic Church.

In early 2015, plans were announced to add 41 rowhouses to the property that will be located to the north and south of the current building (which will remain). It was listed on the National Register of Historic Places in 2019.
