= Hill Top, Menifee County, Kentucky =

Unincorporated community in Kentucky, United States

Hill Top, Kentucky
- Unincorporated community
- Location within Kentucky Location within the United States
- Coordinates: 37°59′10″N 83°37′09″W
- Country: United States
- State: Kentucky
- County: Menifee
- Elevation: 1,129 ft (344 m)
- Time zone: UTC-5 (Eastern (EST))
  - Summer (DST): UTC-4 (EDT)
- Area code: 606
- GNIS feature ID: 2400783

Hill Top is an unincorporated community in Menifee County, Kentucky, United States. Hill Top is located on Kentucky Route 36 2.4 miles (3.9 km) north of Frenchburg.
