= St. Ambrose Church (Cheverly, Maryland) =

St. Ambrose Catholic Church
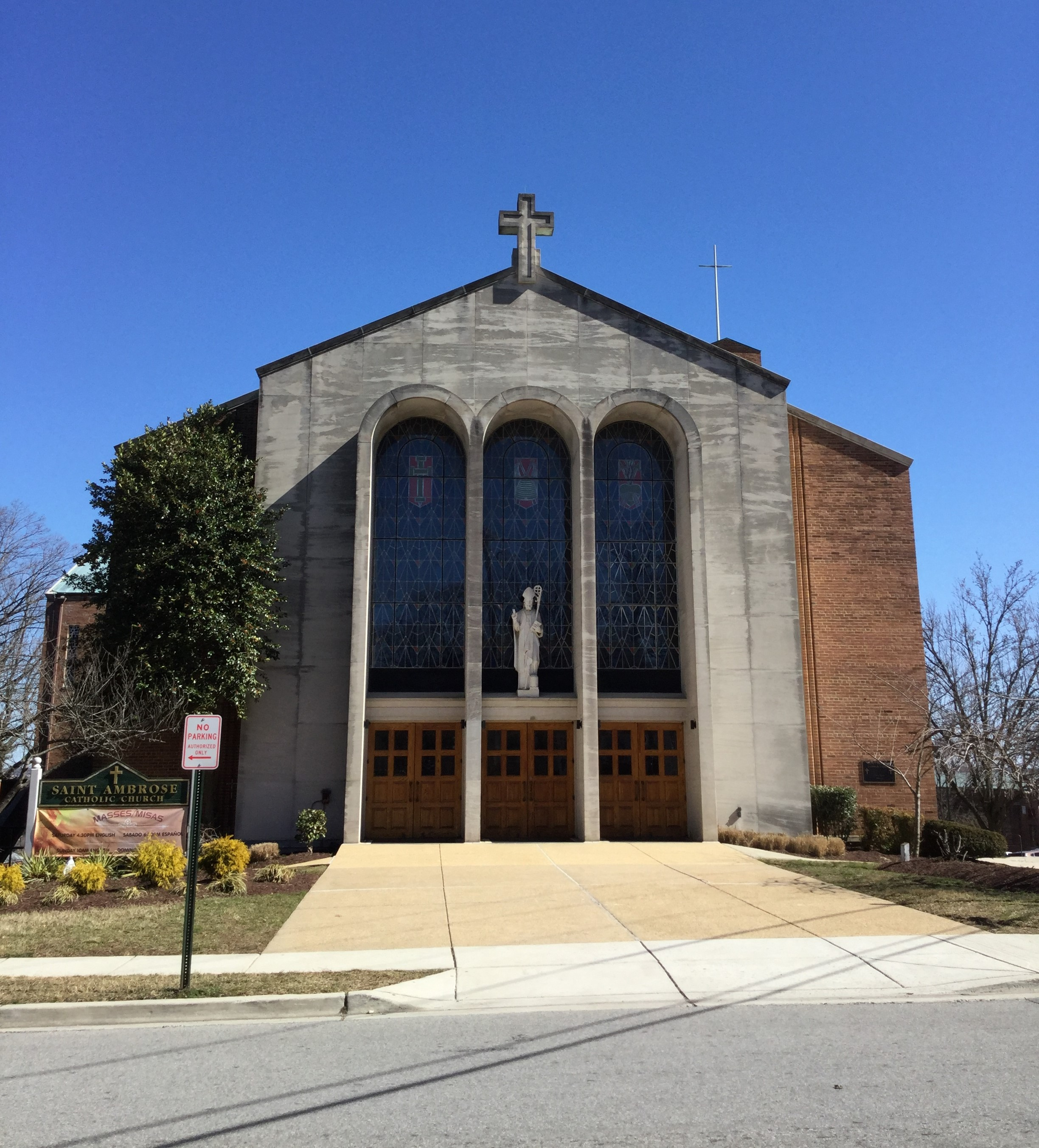
- St. Ambrose Catholic Church
- St. Ambrose Catholic Church
- 38.928985°N 76.908225°W
- Location: 3107 63rd Ave, Cheverly, Maryland
- Country: United States
- Denomination: Roman Catholic

Administration
- Archdiocese: Washington

St. Ambrose Catholic Church is parish of the Roman Catholic Church located at 3107 63rd Ave in Cheverly, Maryland, in the Archdiocese of Washington.

== History ==
The area was first part of the parish of St. Mary of the Mills in Laurel, then transferred to the parish of Saint Jerome in Hyattsville. In 1886, a small mission chapel was built on property donated by the Wilson family in Landover, Maryland. This chapel remained in use until 1960, when demolished to make way for the John Hanson Highway.

The community was erected as an independent parish in 1948, and the parish settled in its present location in 1950 with the opening of a Saint Ambrose Catholic School at 6310 Jason St. and a convent located across Jason St. Mass was held in the school gymnasium until the parish church was later built in 1961. A rectory was later built next door to the church on 63rd Ave.

== Parish Groups ==
St. Ambrose Church features several groups including the Ladies of Charity, the Men's Club, the St. Vincent de Paul Society, and several choirs that sing at mass each week.
