= Saint Mary, Mother of God Catholic Church (Washington, D.C.) =

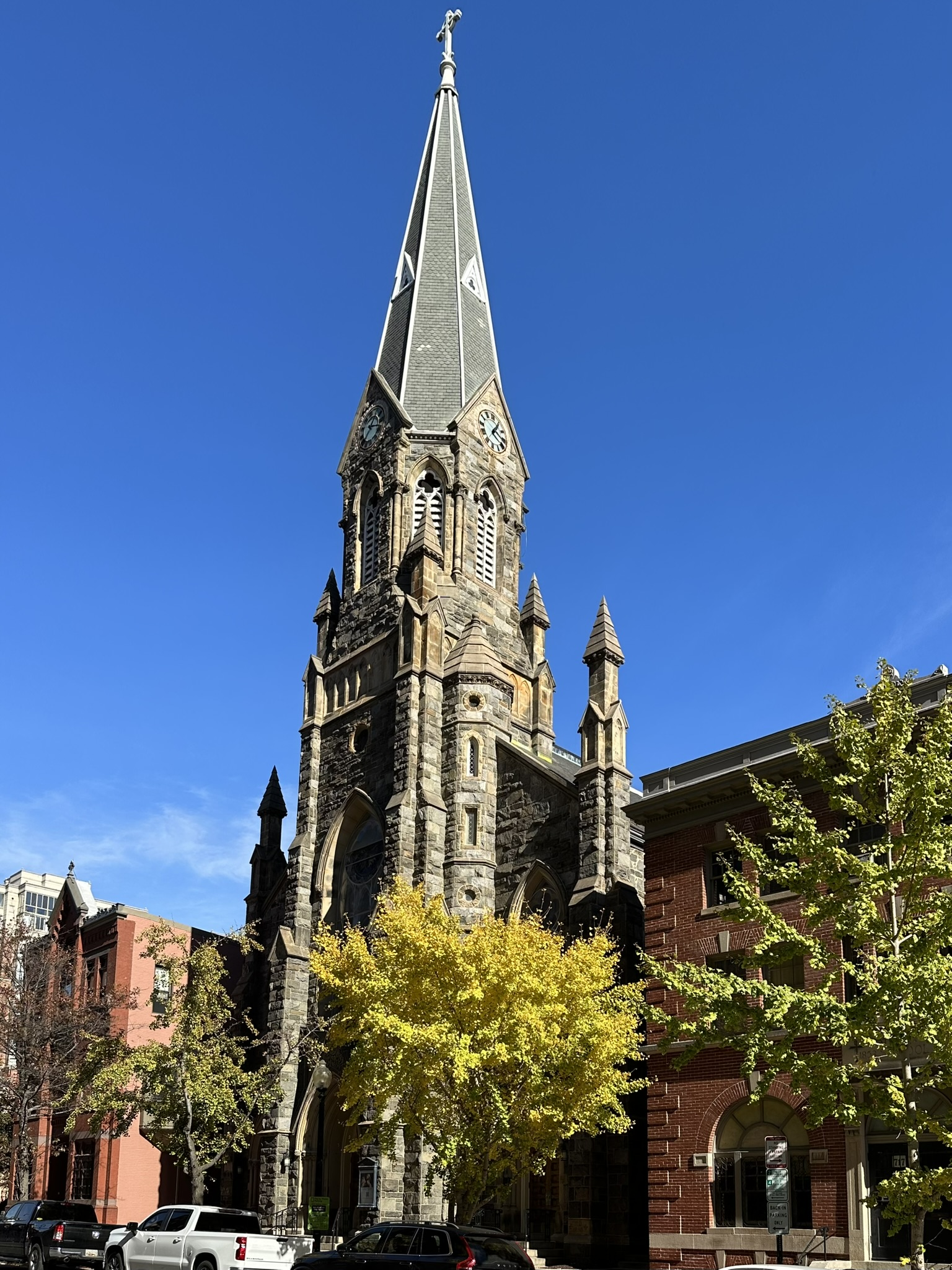
- Saint Mary, Mother of God in 2023
- Saint Mary, Mother of God Catholic Church
- 38°53′58″N 77°01′07″W
- Location: 727 Fifth Street, NW, Washington, D.C.
- Country: United States
- Denomination: Roman Catholic
- Website: saintmarymotherofgod.org

History
- Founded: 1845
- Dedicated: 1890

Administration
- Archdiocese: Washington
- Deanery: Northwest-East

Clergy
- Pastor: Fr. Vincent De Rosa

Saint Mary, Mother of God, previously known as St. Mary's German Catholic Church, was founded in 1845 by German immigrants and was dedicated in 1890 as a parish. It is in the Roman Catholic Archdiocese of Washington's northwest-east deanery, and is known for formerly celebrating the traditional Tridentine Mass.

== Location ==
Saint Mary, Mother of God Catholic Church is located at 727 Fifth Street, NW in Washington, DC near the Government Accountability Office Building, the National Building Museum, and Gallery Place Chinatown metro station.

== History ==
=== Parish priests ===
- Fr. Mark Ivany (2025-present)
- Fr. Vincent DeRosa (2018–2025)
- Fr. Alfred J. Harris (2006–2018)
- George Glaab, DD (1891)
- Rev. Fr. Mathias Alig (1845)

== Art and music ==
=== Architecture ===
The current building was designed by the Baltimore architectural firm of Baldwin & Pennington and erected in 1890-91.

=== Organ ===
The organ in the church was made by George S. Hutchings of Boston and was installed in 1891.

== Cemetery ==
St. Mary's Cemetery
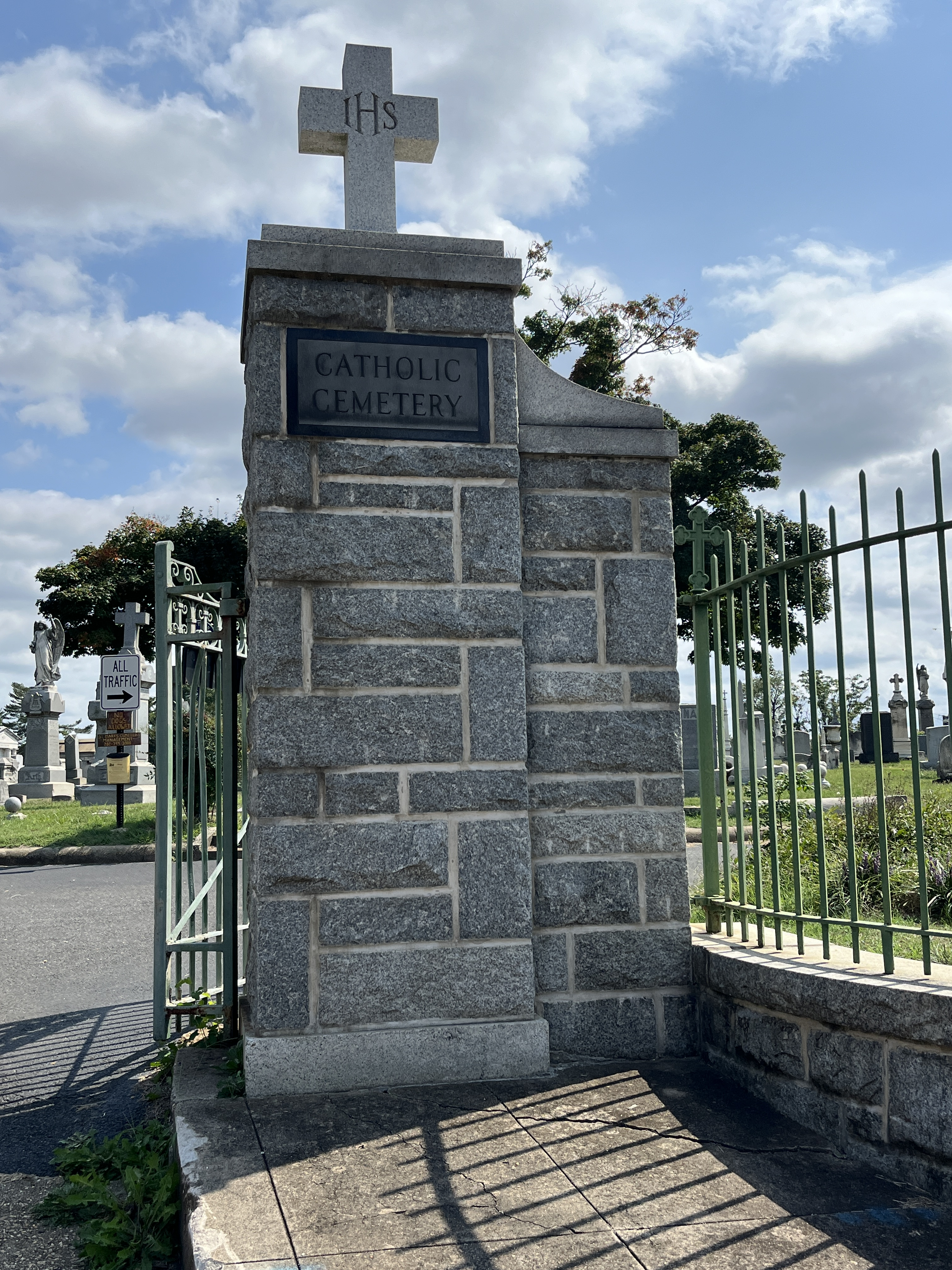
- Part of the entrance, 2024
- Interactive map of St. Mary's Cemetery

Details
- Established: March 25, 1870
- Location: 2121 Lincoln Road NE, Washington, D.C., 20002
- Country: United States
- Coordinates: 38°55′09″N 77°00′19″W

St. Mary's Cemetery (also known as the Saint Mary Mother of God German Catholic Church Cemetery and the St. Mary's German Catholic Cemetery) is a Catholic cemetery in Washington, D.C., United States, overseen by the Roman Catholic Archdiocese of Washington.

St. Mary's Cemetery was consecrated on March 25, 1870, the day of the Feast of the Annunciation, following a march from the church by several community groups and sermons in both German and English. Its neighbor immediately to the east is Glenwood Cemetery. In an 1882 obituary for the Saint Mary, Mother of God Catholic Church parish priest, Mathias Alig, who had served for almost 40 years, it was called "the new Metropolis (German Catholic) Cemetery." The District of Columbia's Office of Planning says: "Established in 1875 initially to serve German congregants of the church that dated to 1846, later also accepted a large number of Greek and Italian burials; initially located on O Street between North Capitol and 1st Streets, NE." Another source places the first graveyard on "O north between North Capitol and 3rd west."

According to The Washington Post: "Gates are open daily from sunrise to sunset. Originally this was a cemetery for St. Mary Mother of God Parish, established in 1845 at 725 Fifth St. NW. This was a working-class cemetery first for German butchers, bakers and others, later for Italians who were stonecutters and laborers. The oldest gravestone is dated Nov. 16, 1862."

Circa 1901, a destitute 60-year-old man known only as Frenchy lived in adjacent to St. Mary's Cemetery, originally in a hand-dug cave in the woods and later in a stable situated on the fenceline. He was possibly a veteran of the Franco-Prussian War, and he decorated his coat with bits of metal he found discarded on the grounds. Frenchy spent his Sundays visiting every Catholic Church in the city, ending his day with prayers in the St. Mary's graveyard.

During World War I, which saw an increase in anti-German sentiment in the United States, German-American veterans of the American Civil War showcased their patriotism by marching with flags and decorating the graves of veterans buried at St. Mary's Cemetery. The gesture was apparently ineffectual as Congress passed a law banning Germans from living in the capital city, including Fr. John Roth, the German-born priest of St. Mary's.

== See also ==
- Basilica of St. Mary (Alexandria, Virginia)
- List of cemeteries in the United States
- List of parishes in the Roman Catholic Archdiocese of Washington
