= Hill Top, West Virginia =

- Unincorporated community
- Location within West Virginia Location within the United States
- Coordinates: 37°27′55″N 80°54′30″W
- Country: United States
- State: West Virginia
- County: Summers
- Elevation: 2,018 ft (615 m)
- Time zone: UTC-5 (Eastern (EST))
  - Summer (DST): UTC-4 (EDT)
- Area codes: 304 & 681
- GNIS feature ID: 1549742

Hill Top is an unincorporated community in Summers County, West Virginia, United States, located 23 miles (37 km) south of Hinton.

A variant name was Tophet.
