= Hilltop Lodge =

- U.S. National Register of Historic Places
- NM State Register of Cultural Properties
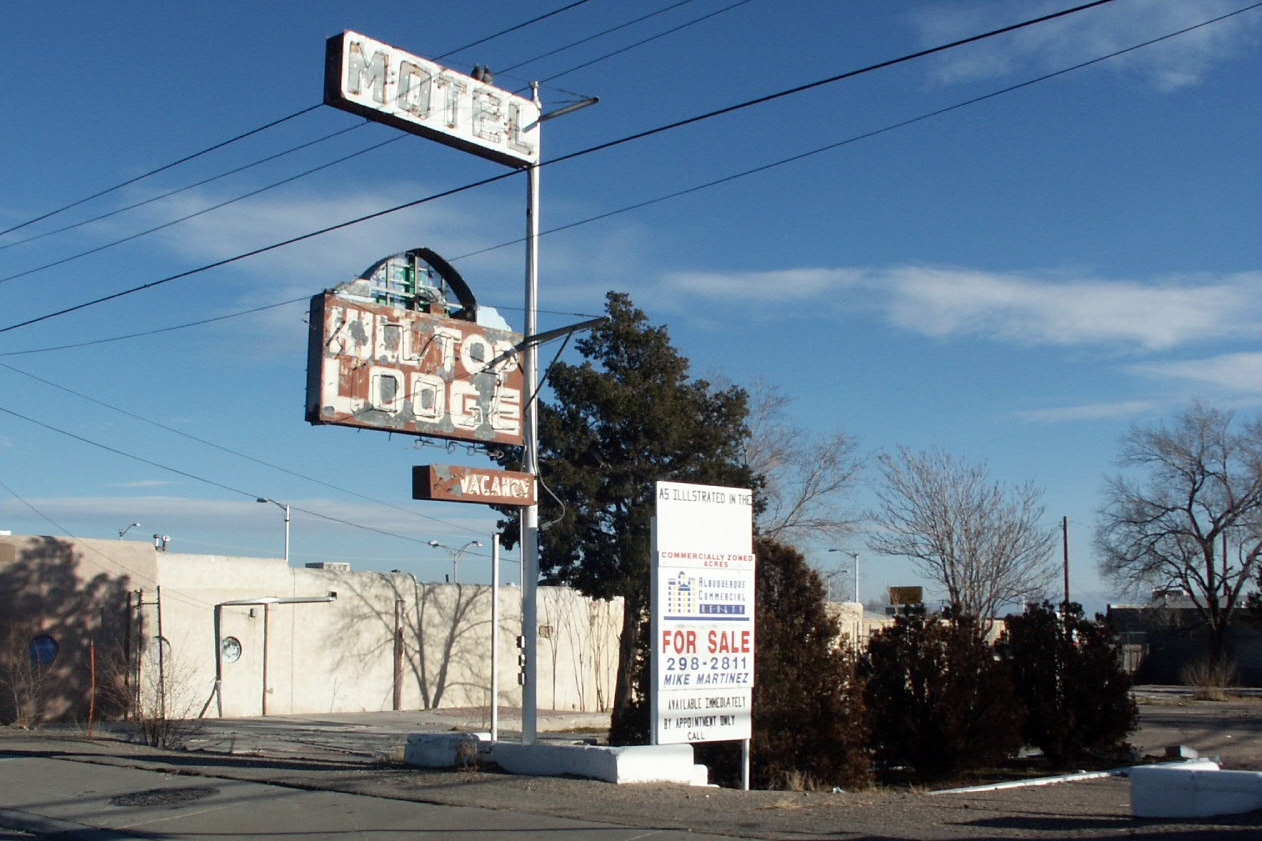
- The site of the former motel in 2004

- Location within New Mexico Location within the United States
- Location: 5410 Central Ave. SW, Albuquerque, New Mexico
- Coordinates: 35°4′56″N 106°41′47″W
- Built: 1946
- NRHP reference No.: 97001597
- NMSRCP No.: 1679

Significant dates
- Added to NRHP: January 9, 1998
- Designated NMSRCP: May 9, 1997

The Hilltop Lodge was a historic motel on Central Avenue (former U.S. Route 66) in Albuquerque, New Mexico, which was notable as one of the best-preserved Route 66 motels remaining in the city. It began as a small three-unit lodging in 1941, and was expanded to 12 units by owner E. H. Stopple in 1946. The property was added to the New Mexico State Register of Cultural Properties in 1997 and the National Register of Historic Places in 1998. The motel was demolished in 2003 after being shut down by the city as a nuisance property. The remainder of the site, including the neon sign, was cleared around 2017 for a realignment of Yucca Drive due to the Albuquerque Rapid Transit project.

The motel was a one-story, L-shaped building with 12 rooms. The office and manager's residence were at the front of the building, which had a decorative stepped parapet and a small porch.

== See also ==
- List of motels
