= St. John the Evangelist Catholic Church (Silver Spring, Maryland) =

Catholic parish in Maryland, US

Coordinates: 39°1′20.8″N 77°2′40″W

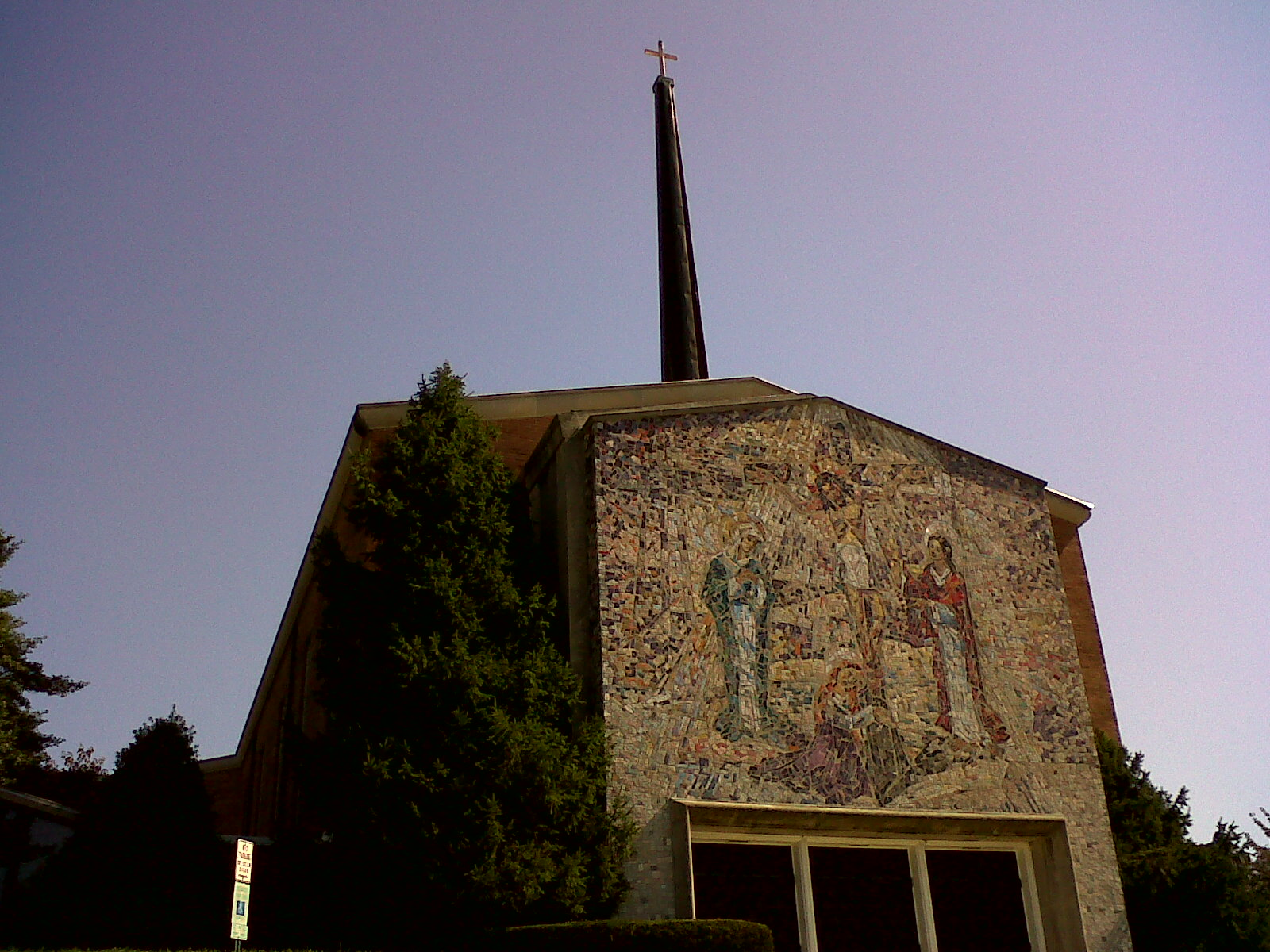

Religion
- Affiliation: Catholic Church
- Province: Archdiocese of Washington

Location
- Location: 10103 Georgia Ave., Silver Spring, Maryland, U.S.
- Interactive map of St. John the Evangelist Catholic Church

Architecture
- Style: Modern
- Completed: 1962
- Materials: Brick

Website
- www.sjeparish.org

Saint John the Evangelist Catholic Church is a parish of the Catholic Church in Maryland in the United States founded by Fr. John Carroll in 1774. It falls under the jurisdiction of the Archdiocese of Washington and its archbishop. It is named after John the Evangelist.

== History ==
The community has existed for well over 200 years. In 1774, the first chapel was built on land owned by Carroll's mother. Carroll worked as a missionary in Maryland and Virginia. Carroll moved to Baltimore in late 1786, and the parish was attended by Jesuit missionaries until 1813.

The parish currently owns two separate church buildings, known as the "Main" or "New Church" located at 10103 Georgia Ave Silver Spring, Maryland, and the "Historic" or "Old Church" located at 9700 Rosensteel Ave. Forest Glen, Maryland, built in 1894. The main church, designed by Johnson & Boutin, was built in 1962.

The "historic" church is currently used by St. John the Evangelist. The pastor is Rev. Joseph Calis. Our Lady Queen of Poland - St. Maximillian Kolbe Parish. The pastor of Our Lady Queen of Poland and St. Maximillian Kolbe is Fr. Jerzy Frydrych of the Society of Christ.

The church/school community offers First Communion, Sunday School, grades Pre-Kindergarten through 8, and reconciliation. The current principal of the school is Caitlin Keeton. Across from the school, there is also a convent that consists of nuns who are Sisters, Servants of the Immaculate Heart of Mary (I.H.M.).

In Cardinal James Gibbons' speech at the laying of the cornerstone of the old church at Forest Glen, he stated that St. John the Evangelist was "...the Bethlehem of the church in America..." with the understood metaphor of Baltimore being the Jerusalem.

== Personnel ==
- Pastor: Rev. Joseph Calis

== Gallery ==
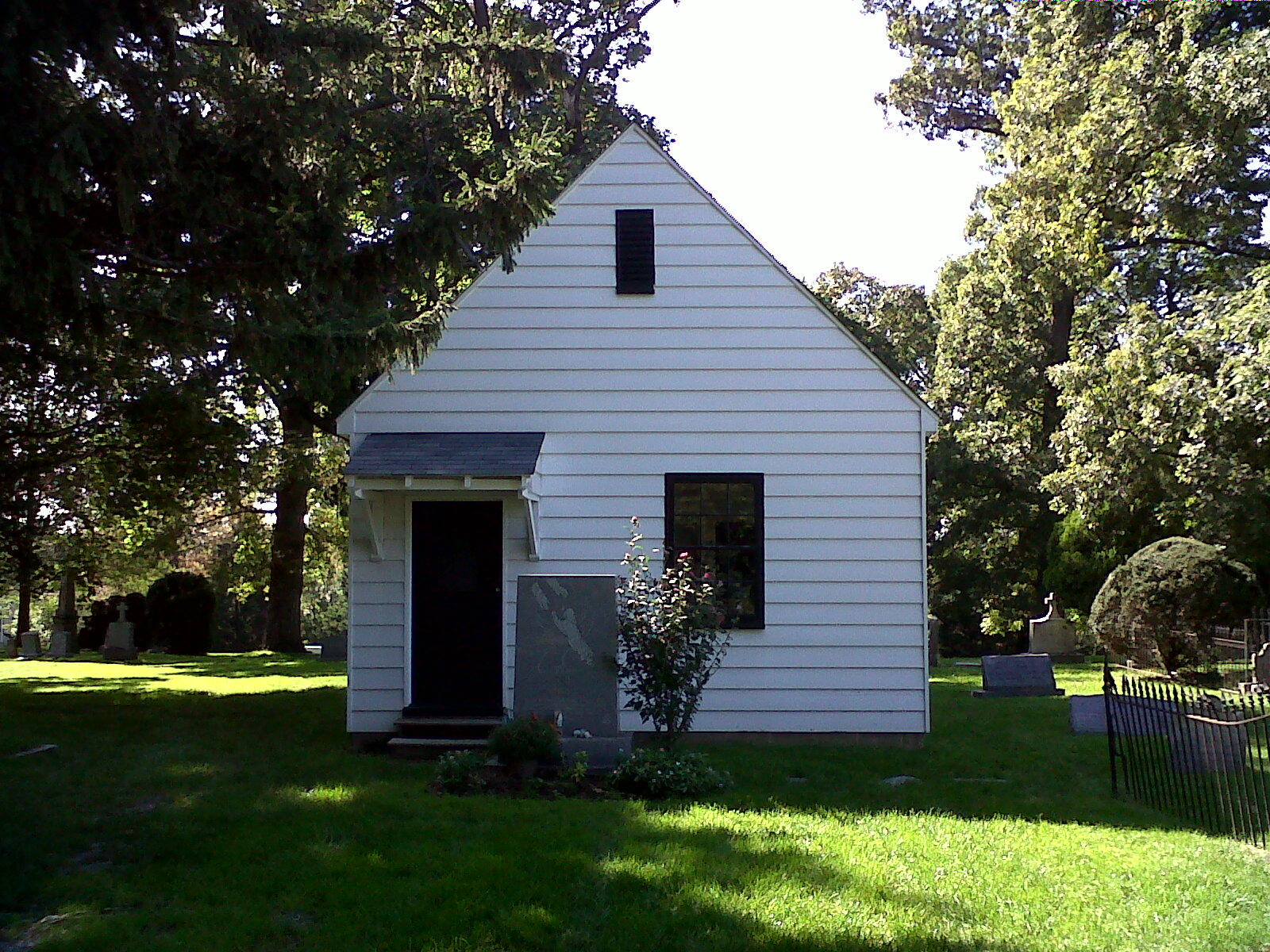
20th-century reconstruction of the original St. John's Church

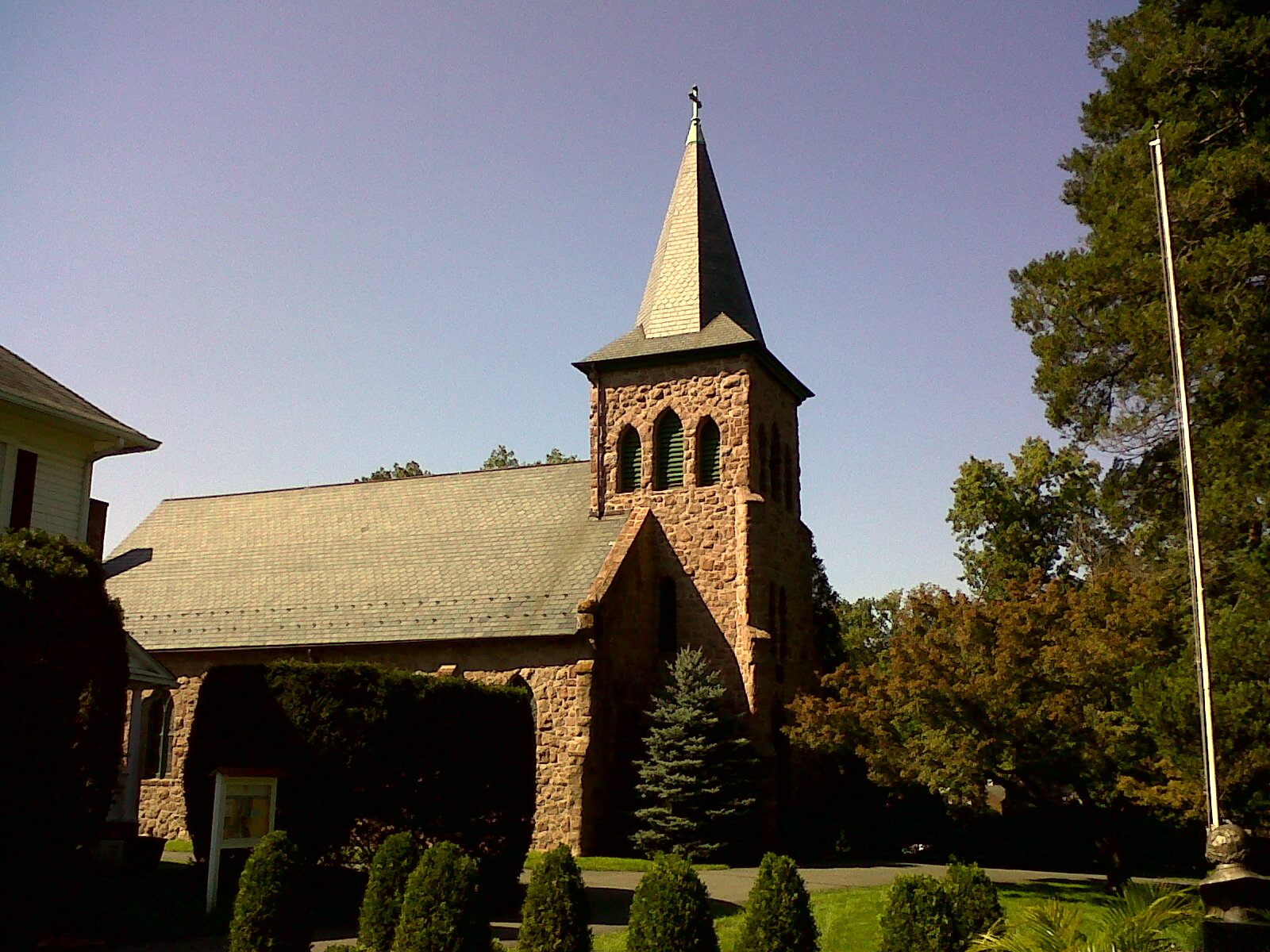
St. John's Church built in 1894

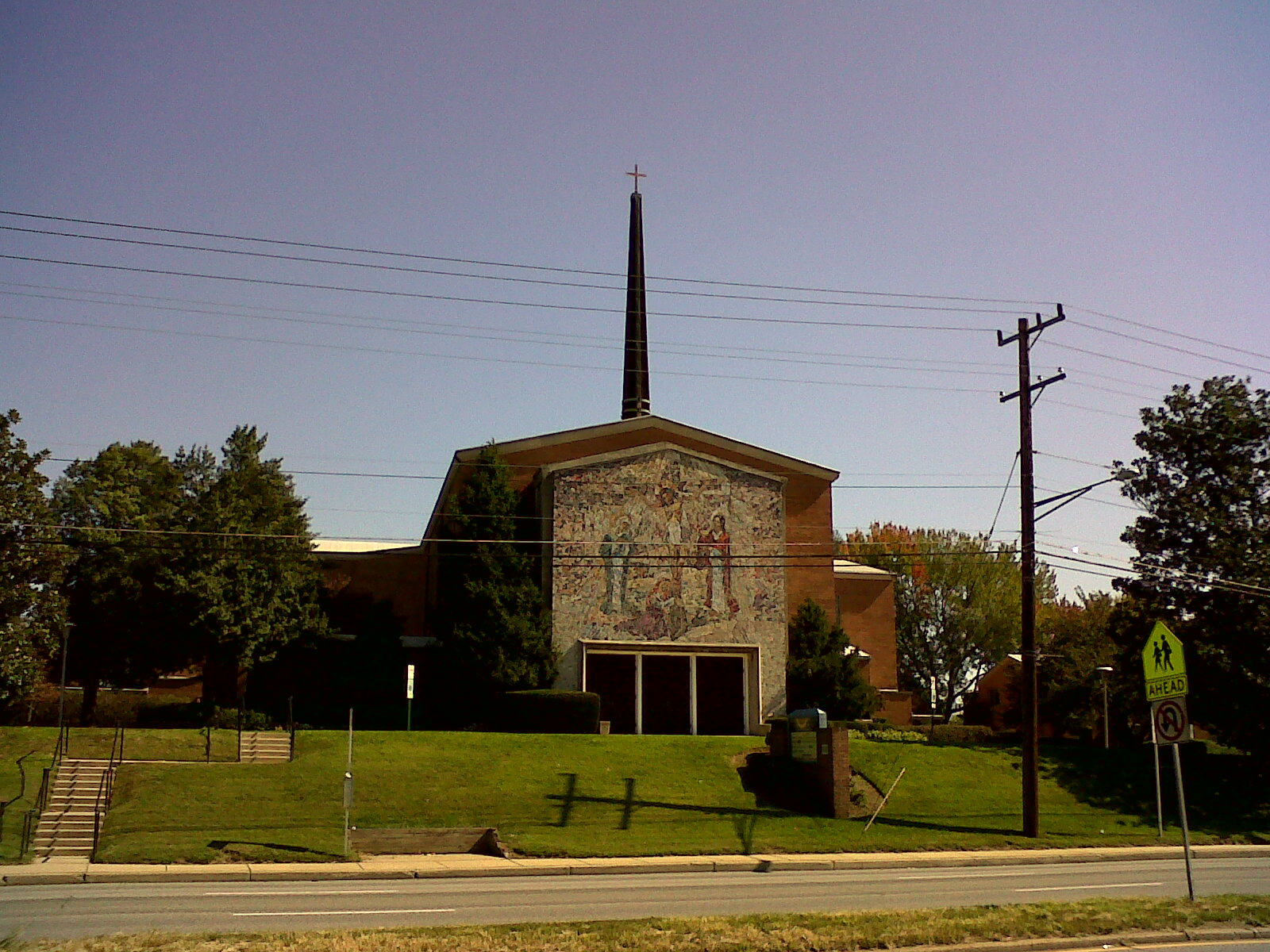
View of the church across Georgia Avenue

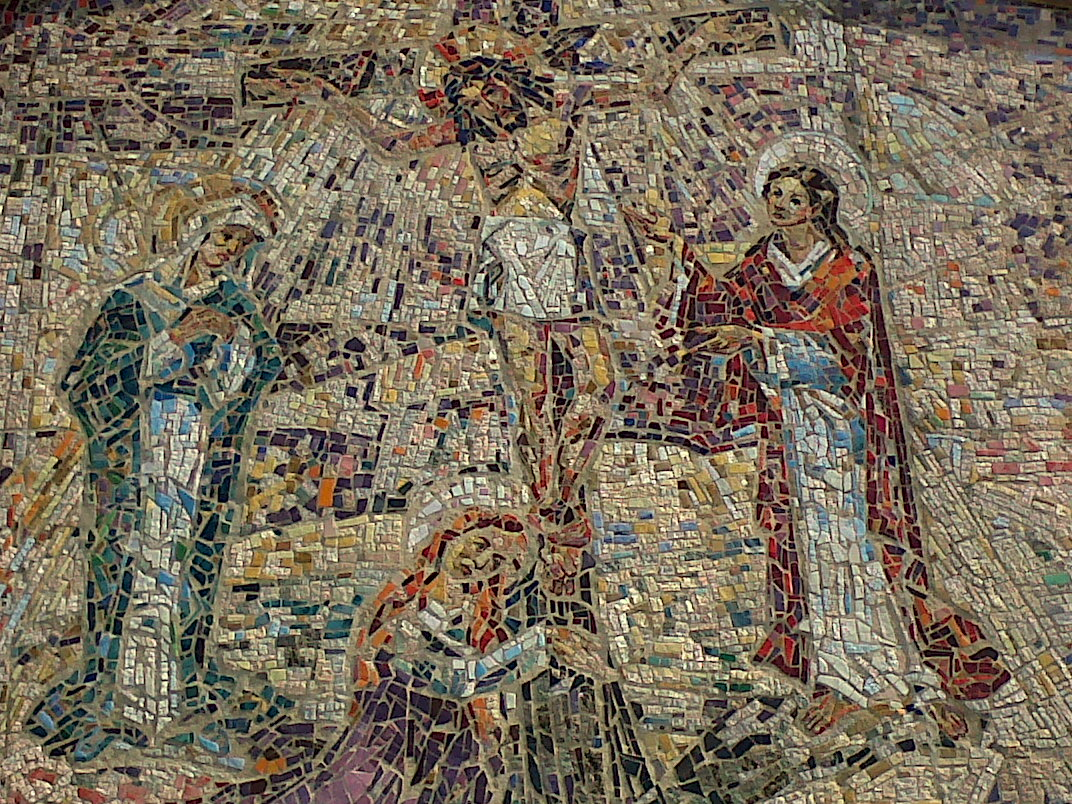
Detail of the Mosaic on the façade of the church
