= Hill Top, McCreary County, Kentucky =

Unincorporated community in Kentucky, United States

Hill Top, Kentucky
- Unincorporated community
- Location within Kentucky Location within the United States
- Coordinates: 36°43′21″N 84°32′00″W
- Country: United States
- State: Kentucky
- County: McCreary
- Elevation: 1,217 ft (371 m)
- Time zone: UTC-5 (Eastern (EST))
  - Summer (DST): UTC-4 (EDT)
- Area code: 606
- GNIS feature ID: 512709

Hill Top is an unincorporated community in McCreary County, Kentucky, United States. Hill Top is located on Kentucky Route 92 near the Big South Fork of the Cumberland River, 3.5 miles (5.6 km) west of Whitley City.

A post office was established in the community in 1925, and named for its scenic overlooks.
