= The Hilltop =

The Hilltop may refer to:

- The Hilltop (newspaper), the student newspaper of Howard University in Washington, D.C.
- The Hilltop (novel), a 2013 Israeli novel by Assaf Gavron
- Hilltop, Columbus, Ohio
- "The Hilltop", a nickname for Georgetown University in Washington, D.C.
- "The Hilltop", a nickname for Saint Anselm College in Manchester, N.H.
- "The Hilltop", a nickname for Southern Methodist University in Dallas, TX
- Nickname for the University of San Francisco in San Francisco, CA
- Hilltop Park, an early Major League Baseball park in New York City
