= Our Lady, Queen of the Americas (Washington, D.C.) =

Our Lady, Queen of the Americas Catholic Church
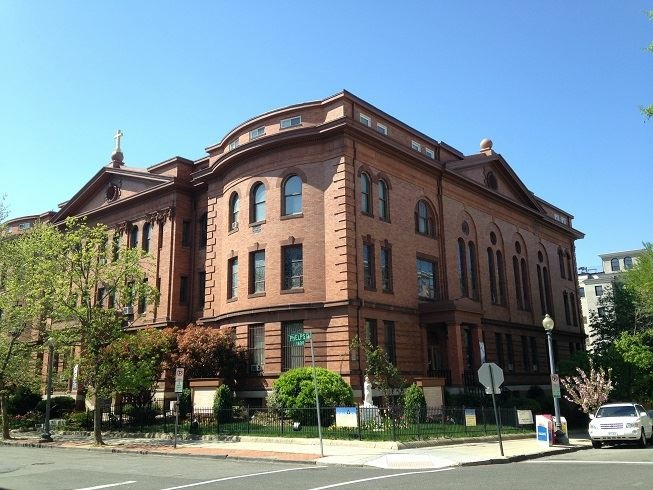
- Our Lady, Queen of the Americas Catholic Church
- Our Lady, Queen of the Americas Catholic Church
- 38.915845°N 77.049173°W
- Location: 2200 California St., NW; Washington, D.C.
- Country: United States
- Denomination: Roman Catholic
- Website: http://ourladyqueenoftheamericasdc.org

Administration
- Archdiocese: Archdiocese of Washington

Clergy
- Archbishop: Wilton D. Gregory

Our Lady Queen of the Americas is a Roman Catholic church serving the Hispanic community in the Washington, DC area.

== History ==
In 1955, the directory of the Archdioceses of Washington included St. Ann's Asylum and Maternity Home at 2200 California St NW, Washington, D.C., established 1869.

In 1967, to serve the spiritual and social needs of the growing Hispanic population of the Washington Metropolitan Area, the Archdiocese of Washington established the Mission known as "Capilla Latina" at 2200 California St., NW (at the time the Cathedral Latin School). The chapel and classrooms were leased evenings during the week and on weekends to celebrate Mass in Spanish and Portuguese, and to teach English, basic skills and literacy classes.

In 1986, the Capilla Latina (Latin Chapel in Spanish) became the Parish of Our Lady Queen of the Americas and Cuban-born Fr. José Somoza O.F.M. was appointed pastor.

In 1989, the property and building at 2200 California Street, N. W., were transferred to Our Lady Queen of the Americas for the purpose of serving the Hispanic and Portuguese communities, and for building of the premises the Educational and Pastoral Center and the Church.

In 1993, at the request of Our Lady Queen of the Americas Catholic Church, a handful of volunteers taught evening and Sunday classes to 200 Central American parishioners. With access to a single computer, classes focused on English as a second language, graduate equivalency degrees, and U.S. Citizenship. Job openings were posted on a bulletin board.

From that beginning, Washington English Center has expanded the English literacy education and workforce preparation programs provided by volunteer teachers and tutors to adult immigrants from across the greater Washington area. Today, students, who represent over 100 countries and a variety of world religions, learn from 350 volunteer teachers each term. Students use two computer labs for language lesson reinforcement, computer literacy instruction and job searches. The Employment Services program combines job counseling with industry certification and career workshops. Conversation reading, chorus clubs, class field trips, and local services and health fairs create a strong sense of community.

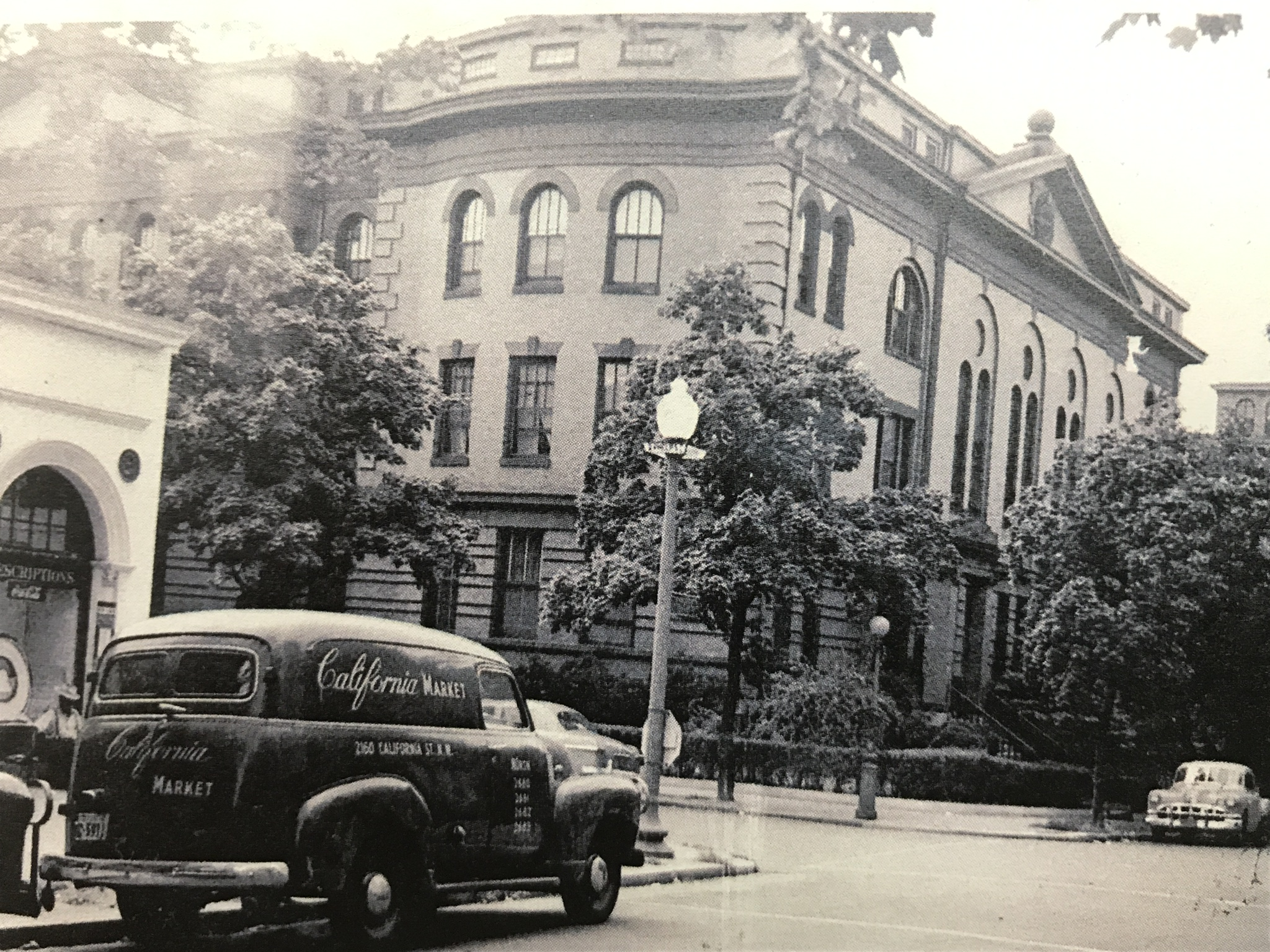
St. Annes Infant Asylum in 1951, which in 1967 became Our Lady, Queen of the Americas parish.
