= St. Mary of the Annunciation Catholic Church =

St. Mary of the Annunciation Catholic Church may refer to:

- St. Mary of the Annunciation Catholic Church (Charleston, South Carolina)
- St. Mary of the Annunciation Catholic Church (Portsmouth, Ohio)
