= Hilltop, Nevada =

- Ghost town
- Location within the state of Nevada Hilltop, Nevada (the United States)
- Coordinates: 40°24′53″N 116°48′01″W
- Country: United States
- State: Nevada
- County: Lander
- Elevation: 6,460 ft (1,969 m)
- Time zone: UTC-8 (Pacific (PST))
  - Summer (DST): UTC-7 (PDT)
- GNIS feature ID: 856043

Hilltop is an extinct town in Lander County in the U.S. state of Nevada. The Geographic Names Information System classifies it as a populated place. It was named for its lofty elevation.

== History ==
The mining district was discovered in 1906 and boomed in 1908. In 1912, a 10-stamp amalgamation mill was built and later converted for the cyanide process. A post office was established at Hilltop in 1909 and operated until 1931.
