= Annunciation Catholic Church (Washington, D.C.) =

Church in the District of Columbia

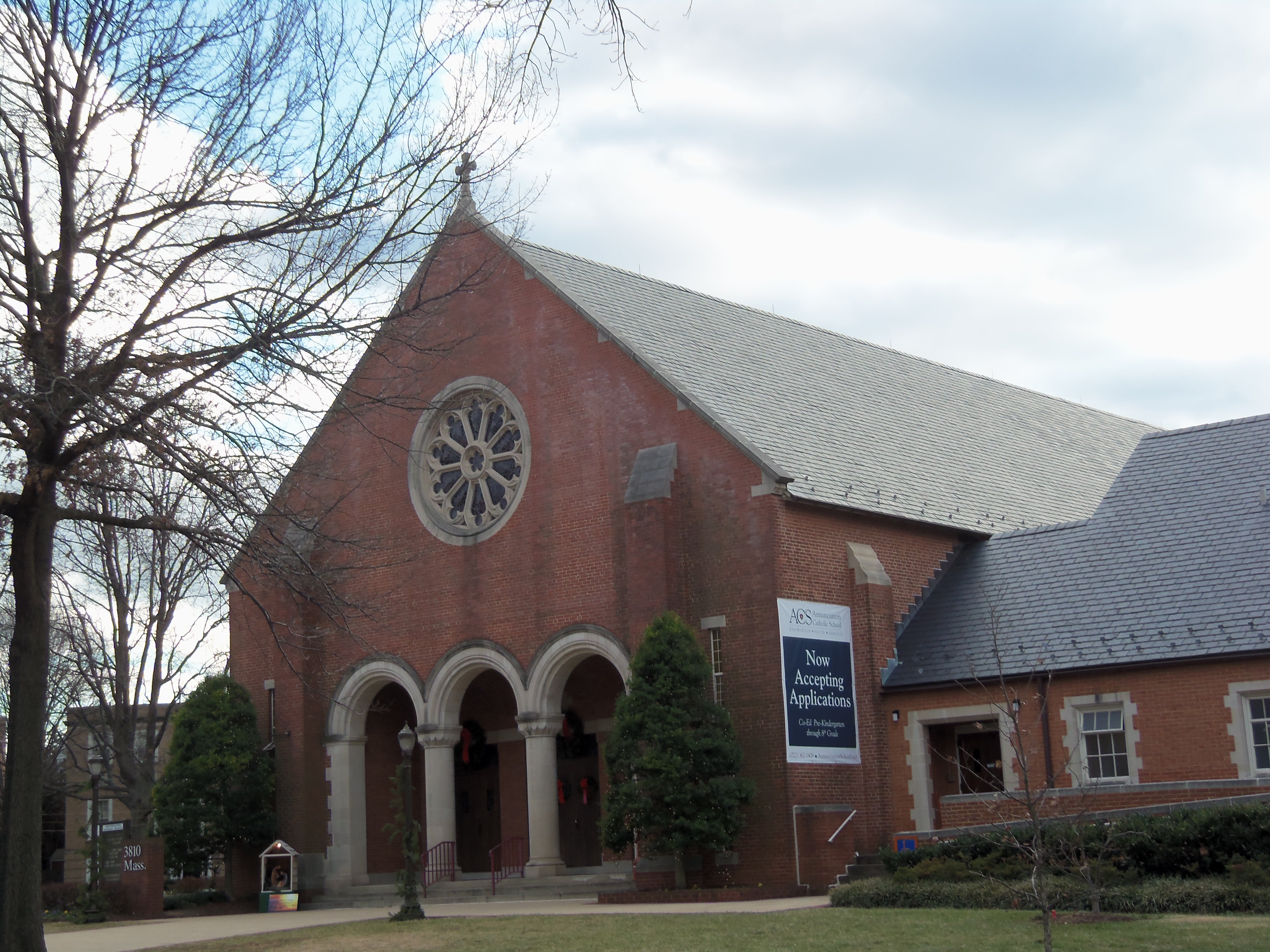

- Location in Washington, DC Annunciation Catholic Church (the United States)
- 38.930189°N 77.075804°W
- Location: 3810 Massachusetts Ave NW; Washington, D.C.
- Country: USA
- Denomination: Roman Catholic
- Website: www.annunciationdc.org

History
- Status: Active

Architecture
- Functional status: Parish church

Administration
- Archdiocese: Washington

Clergy
- Pastor: Fr. Scott Hahn

Annunciation Catholic Church is a parish of the Roman Catholic Church in Northwest Washington, D.C. Its parish church and hall and a parochial school, Annunciation Catholic School, are located along Massachusetts Avenue in the Cathedral Heights neighborhood, part of the Northwest-West Deanery within the Archdiocese of Washington.

The parish is known for hosting regular musical performances, the Catherine and Mary Roth Concerts Series.

== History ==
Michael Joseph Curley, Archbishop of Baltimore, acquired the property where the current parish buildings are now located in 1937, but the outbreak of World War II prevented construction from going forward. As an alternative, he purchased a structure from parish of Our Lady of Lourdes in Bethesda and opened it as the Church of the Annunciation on July 11, 1943 as a mission of St. Ann's in Tenley Circle.

Annunciation was designated a parish in its own right on June 12, 1948, with Fr. Russell Phelan named the first pastor. Construction of the school, convent, and parish hall was completed by 1954. Annunciation Catholic School opened the same year, staffed by religious sisters from the Society of the Holy Child Jesus. Fr. Phelan was succeeded in 1963 by Msgr. William Hoffman, and he in 1966 by Msgr. E. Robert Arthur. Msgr. James F. Montgomery served as the pastor from 1972 until 2000. In July 2023, after a three-year investigation by the Archdiocese, he was placed on the diocese's list of priests credibly accused of sexual abuse of a minor.

In August 1976, the church hosted Karol Wojtyla, then cardinal and Archbishop of Krakow, later elected Pope John Paul II and canonized in 2014.

In June 2025, Cardinal Robert McElroy appointed Fr. Scott Hahn as pastor, effective July 9, 2025.

== See also ==
- Official website
- School website
