= Hill Top, Stanley =

Village in County Durham, England

Coordinates: 54°53′10″N 1°44′56″W

Hill Top is a village in County Durham, England. It is situated to the west of Tantobie, near Stanley.
