= Hill jumping =

Rally driving manoeuvre

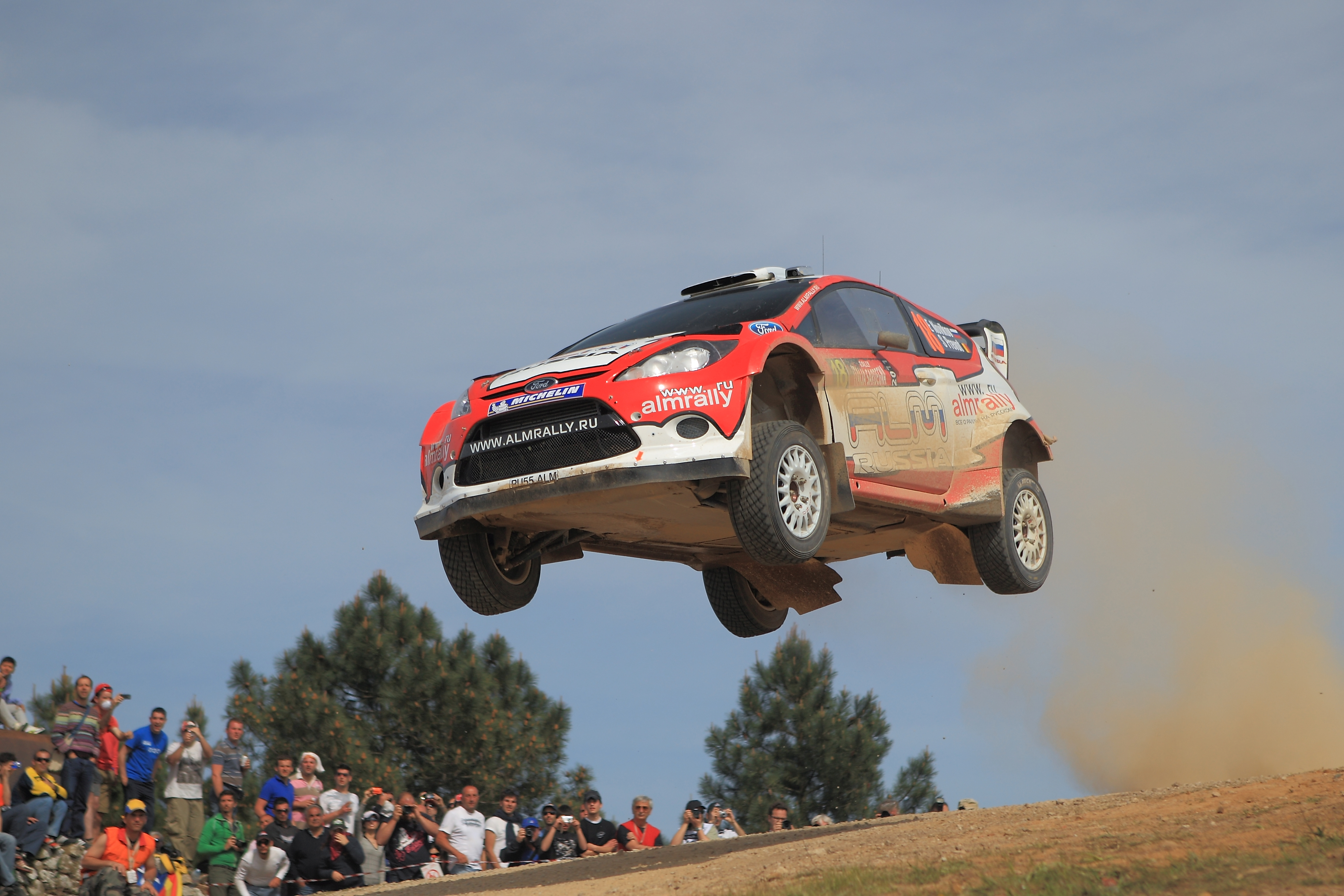
Airborne rally vehicle in Sardinia

Hill jumping is the act of accelerating a rally vehicle as it approaches the top of a hill, causing the vehicle to go airborne. The activity is also called "hill topping" and "yumping".

Hill jumping may take place at formal rally racing events. Or, at substantial risk to the health and safety of participants and third parties, it may take place on public roads at informal gatherings or by thrill seeking individuals. Hill jumping can also be performed on skateboards, it can take place on roads, trails, or even ramps. Depending on the height of the hill, it can result in injury or death.
