= Hill Top, Maryland =

Hill Top
- Unincorporated community
- Location within the state of Maryland
- Coordinates: 38°29′20″N 077°07′19″W
- Country: United States
- State: Maryland
- County: Charles
- Time zone: UTC-5 (Eastern (EST))
  - Summer (DST): UTC-4 (EDT)

Hill Top, Maryland, is a rural community in Charles County, 2.4 km (1.5 mi) west-northwest of Welcome and 3.2 km (2 mi) east-southeast of Ironsides, on Hilltop Road, a loop off of Maryland Route 6 (locally known as Port Tobacco Road), and about 7 miles west of Port Tobacco. Hill Top existed as a community as early as 1850, in which year it is shown in the U.S. Federal Census as a census district. Hilltop is the seat of a Roman Catholic parish founded in 1851, whose first church building, St. Ignatius Church, was constructed in 1859.

At the outbreak of the Civil War in 1861, a corps of Union artillery was stationed at Hill Top, a consequence of the county's perceived Southern sympathies. Hill Top is in the Nanjemoy Creek watershed.
