= Hill Top, Teesdale =

Village in County Durham, England

Coordinates: 54°36′56″N 2°0′32″W

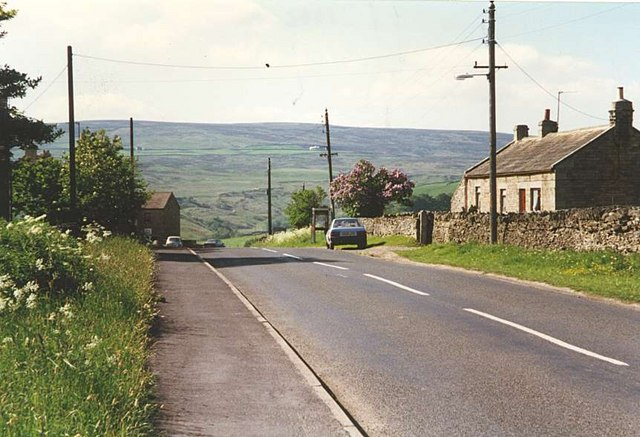
Teesdale viewed from Hill Top

Hill Top is a small village in County Durham, in England. It is situated to the north of Eggleston.
