= John N. Robinson =

American painter

- "In the Studio", 1945
- Born: John Nathaniel Robinson; February 18, 1912; Washington, D.C.
- Died: October 17, 1994 (aged 82); Washington, D.C.

John N. Robinson (February 8, 1912 – October 17, 1994) was an African-American artist who lived and worked in Washington, D.C. He made realist paintings showing the people and places of his family home, his neighborhood, and the city in which he lived. Called "quiet and conscientious" and praised for works of "sincerity and humility," he was particularly noted for portraits that showed his sitters in a way that successfully revealed their individual character. A critic for Washington Post characterized his paintings as "hymns to the ordinary" and said they were "warmed by gratitude and gentleness."

== Early life and training ==
Robinson was born in Washington, D.C., on February 18, 1912. Eight years later he and his four siblings were effectively orphaned when their mother died and their father abandoned the family. Adopted by his maternal grandparents, he attended public schools, but dropped out before completing junior high. While still in school he began to make small paintings while doing part-time evening work in a nearby automotive service station where his grandfather was a night watchman. Having seen some of these paintings, the chauffeur of one of the station's clients borrowed a few and showed them to his sister. She showed them to an acquaintance, James V. Herring, then head of the art department at Howard University, and he arranged for Robinson to study under a Howard art teacher, James A. Porter, in return for light cleaning chores. Financial need kept Robinson from working with Porter as long was he wished, but, as he later said, "what I learned at Howard under Professors Herring and Porter was the basis of my efforts in art." After resuming both day and evening jobs, he nonetheless continued to paint, as he later said, whenever and wherever he could, "painting everything from church murals to door decorations." He made his first mural when he was 17, a depiction of Christ at Gethsemane, at the Emmanuel Baptist Church in Anacostia, where his grandparents had moved in 1929. This commission led to others, all within the African-American neighborhoods of the city.

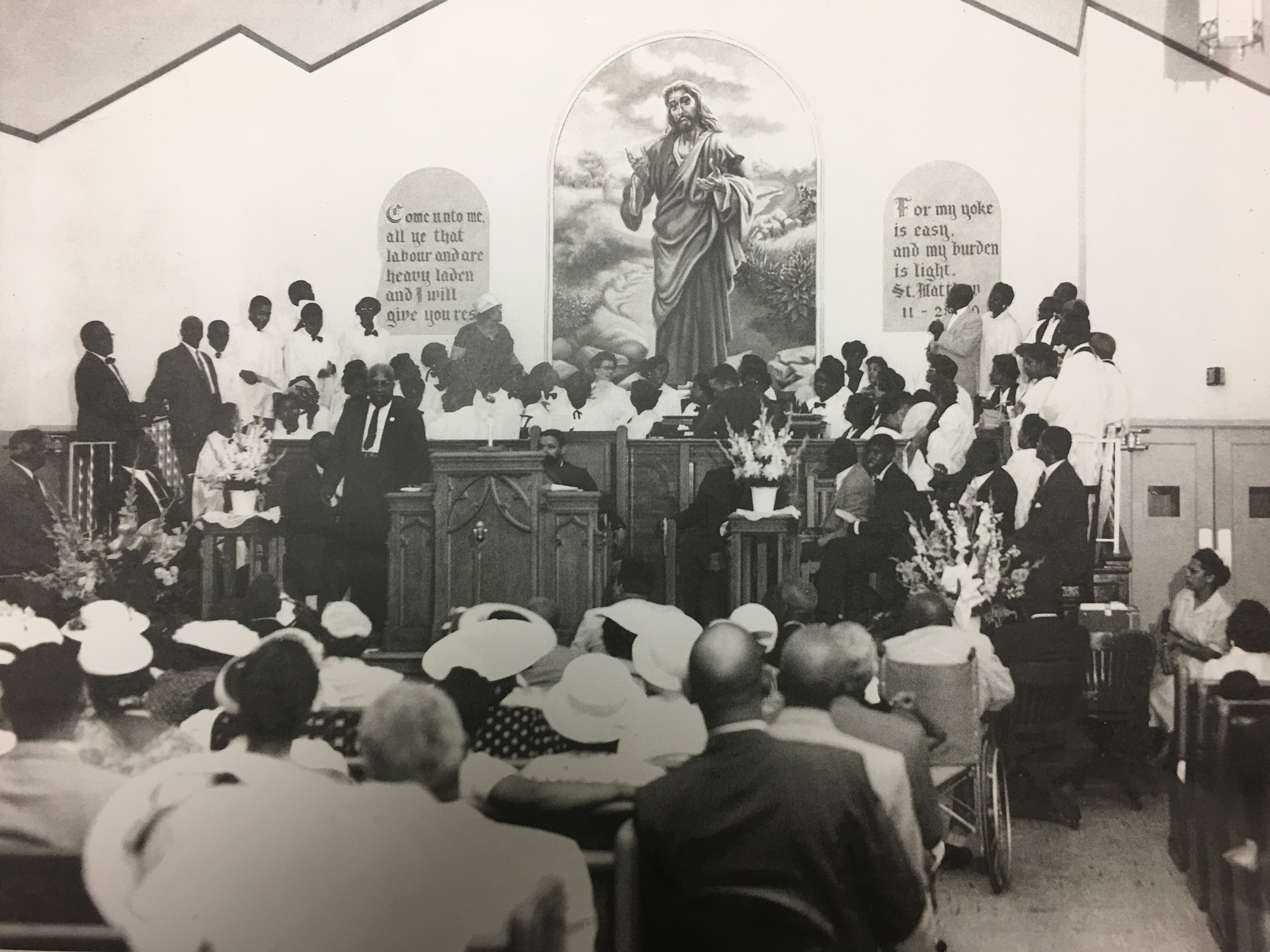
John N. Robinson, Christ at Gethsemane, 1932, mural at the Emmanuel Baptist Church

== Career in art ==
John N. Robinson, Art Fair, 1946, oil on canvas, 35 3/8 × 39 3/8 inches

During the 1930s he obtained full-time employment first in the Civilian Conservation Corps and then as a laborer at the Washington Navy Yard. In 1935 he found work at St. Elizabeths Hospital, which, like the Navy Yard, lay not far from his home in Anacostia. In each of these occupations, he painted when not working and, particularly at St. Elizabeths, was able to sell portraits to some of his fellow workers. Like other African-American artists in segregated Washington, he was unable to find a commercial gallery that would show his work, but, beginning in 1938, he was an eager participant in an annual series of outdoor exhibits sponsored by the Times-Herald newspaper. At these art fairs he would both sell his paintings and make what he called "minute sketches" of passersby charging thirty-five cents each. He befriended area artists and made connections that led to part-time work making backgrounds for a photographic portrait studio. (Note: The Times-Herald art fairs were held annually from 1938 through the end of the 1940s. They took place in city parks, including President's Park (now called Lafayette Square), Franklin Park (now called Franklin Square), and the west side of the Ellipse (sometimes called President's Park South. The first one was held in 1938. The fifth, in 1942, was directed by the journalist and author Blake Ehrlich. Of the sixth, held the following year, a critic for the Washington Post gave favorable notice to the presence of African-American artists and wrote: "In the future, if this show becomes selective it will lose much of it verve. As it stands, it contains more life and interest than many gallery exhibits that we have seen." The last for which there is a public record was held June 21–29, 1947 President's Park.) Shown at left is a painting Robinson made in 1946 showing the crowd at the fair, held that year in President's Park (now called Lafayette Square).

John N. Robinson, Mr and Mrs Barton, 1942, oil on canvas, 39×31 inches

In 1943 a small, nonprofit art gallery opened within a private home near Howard University. Called the Barnett Aden Gallery, it broke with tradition by showing works by African-American as well as white artists. In February 1945 Robinson's paintings were included in a group show held there. (Note: Other artists in the group were William H. Johnson, Lois Mailou Jones, James A. Porter, Céline Marie Tabary, Prentiss Taylor and Hale Woodruff.(p. 193)) (Note: Atlanta University held its first annual Exhibition of Paintings, Prints and Sculpture by Negro Artists of America in 1942. Directed by the artist, Hale Woodruff, the juried exhibition displayed the work of African-American artists a time when racial segregation policies severely limited their opportunities to exhibit.) Later that year he won an award for his painting, "Mr and Mrs Barton," at the fourth annual Exhibition of Paintings held at Atlanta University. This painting, shown at right, is a portrait of the artist's grandparents.

In 1946, 1947, 1948, and 1952 he again appeared with other artists in Barnett Aden shows. (Note: In 1946 the other artists were Jack Berman, Richard Dempsey, Aaron Douglas, Robert Jackson, Lois M. Jones, Herman Maril, Laura Wheeler Waring, Ellis Wilson. In 1947 they were Samuel J. Brown, David Burliuk, Calvin Burnett, Calvin Burnett, Elizabeth Catlett, Minna Citron, Eldzier Cortor, Ralston Crawford, Charles Davis, John Gerard, Malvin Gray Johnson, William H. Johnson, Jacob Lawrence, Herman Maril, I. Rice Pereira, James A. Porter, Laura Wheeler Waring, Ellis Wilson, and Hale Woodruff. In 1948 they were Eldzier Cortor, Aaron Douglas, James Farrar, Lois Mailou Jones, I. Rice Pereira, James A. Porter, Tony Sisti, Henry O. Tanner, Laura Wheeler Waring, Charles White, Ellis Wilson, and Hale Woodruff. In 1952 they were Elizabeth Catlett, Bernice Cross, Richard Dempsey, Robin Jackson, Lois M. Jones, Herman Maril, I. Rice Pereira, Jack Perlmutter, James A. Porter, Candido Portinari, Merton Simpson, Theodore Stamos, James L. Wells, and Ellis Wilson.(pp. 193-197)) During the Barnett Aden exhibition held in 1947 the Evening Star reproduced his portrait, "Mother and Child," and its critic wrote, "John Robinson's naturalistic works comprise the most ingratiating group from the lay standpoint. Among them are a speaking likeness of the Barnett Aden Gallery, a clever self-portrait with reflections on the glass, and a sympathetic 'Mother and Child.'" A year later, when the Greater Washington Area Council of the American Veterans' Committee included works by Robinson in its second annual art exhibition, the same Evening Star critic praised his "phenomenal industry, patience and sharp-focus vision," but said, regarding his painting showing the outdoor art fair that he needed to learn to simplify. (Note: The critic was Florence S. Berryman. A Washington native, she was art critic for the Evening Star during the 1930s and 1940s. She was the sister of James T. Berryman and daughter of Clifford K. Berryman, both of whom won Pulitzer Prizes for their political cartoons.)

Robinson did not court publicity and his financial success was limited by his reluctance to participate in the local art scene through the social functions that brought artists together with collectors and other prospective buyers. He was quoted as having said, "I cannot, I feel, have any regrets about my accomplishments. What comes from art will just come. I don’t feel any need to strive." When his paintings began to command high prices he would still sell them for less, saying that a lot of people who admired his work simply could not afford the going rate. Partly for this reason, his paintings began to sell for much greater sums after his death than they had during his life. In a 2004 auction, one painting brought $9,500 and another sold for $10,000 after a bidding war that set collectors against dealers.

=== Artistic style ===
John N. Robinson, Woman Reading a Bible (Maude Jones), 1940, oil on canvas, 27 3/16 × 23 1/4 inches

Robinson was a realist who painted the people and places of his family home, his neighborhood, and the city in which he lived. Called "quiet and conscientious" and using an approach that was said to be founded on "sincerity and humility," he painted his sitters in a way that revealed their individual character. His work shows no resentment at the injustices he endured through loss of his parents while young and a life marked by poverty and the scourges of then-prevailing racial prejudice, but rather, as one critic said, brought "back the days of traditional family life, love, and happiness." Critics praised his technique but suggested that he tried to put too much detail into some of his work and in other cases he verged perilously close to sentimentality. A 1940 painting, Woman Reading a Bible (Maude Jones), shown at left, is considered to be one of Robinson's best portraits. It was commissioned by a woman who sold newspapers in downtown Washington. In 1994 Robinson said he invited her to his house but after she had sat for him several Sundays, she disappeared and he never saw her again.

In an obituary, the Washington Post's Paul Richard characterized Robinson's paintings as "hymns to the ordinary." Calling them "intimate and accurate," he said, "they tend to be close studies of small domestic wonders - of fluorescent light reflected on a waxed linoleum floor, or his children in the dining room, or lilacs glimpsed in spring through the raindrops on a windowpane," and added that, his pictures were "warmed by gratitude and gentleness."

== Personal life and family ==
Robinson was born on February 18, 1912, in a low-income neighborhood of Georgetown, which, due to the presence of Georgetown University, Holy Trinity church, and the Convent of the Visitation, was known as Holy Hill. (Note: At the time Robinson of his birth Holy Hill was occupied mainly by Irish immigrants and Irish-American families, but, at least partly because it lay not far west of the predominantly African-American neighborhood called Herring Hill, it also attracted many African American residents.) His birth name was John Nathaniel Robinson. His mother having died when he was eight years old and his father having permanently departed, he was taken in and raised by his maternal grandparents, Ignatius Barton and his wife, Anna.

Ignatius (born about 1870) had joined U.S. Army in 1899 and became a Buffalo Soldier in both the 9th and 10th cavalry regiments during the Spanish–American War and subsequent Philippine–American War. He later served at Fort Myer in Virginia. He left active service prior to the outbreak of World War I and subsequently was employed as a night watchman in an automobile service and storage organization called the Key Bridge Garage located near Georgetown at 1213 Bank Street Northwest, Washington, D.C. Robinson described him as a kind man with a gruff exterior. Anna (born about 1886), took in laundry which Robinson and his siblings would pick up and deliver for her. He remembered her as "a warm lovely person."

Robinson had four siblings, including a sister, Margaret (born about 1915), two brothers, Elgin (born about 1914) and Henery (born about 1917). The fourth sibling, born about 1910, has not been identified.

He attended two Washington, D.C., public schools, first Briggs-Montgomery Elementary School and then Francis Junior High School. He dropped out of the latter before graduating. (Note: Located at 22nd and E Streets NW, Briggs-Montgomery Elementary School opened in 1903. Francis Junior High School, at 24th and N Streets NW, opened in 1927.)

In 1924, while still in school, Robinson helped to support his family by sweeping the floor and dusting cars in the evening at the garage where his grandfather worked. After leaving school he continued evening work at the garage and, during the day, did odd jobs in the city and also caddied at two suburban golf courses: (Congressional and Burning Tree).

In 1929 he stayed with his grandparents when they moved from Holy Hill to a new home they had built on a lot they owned in the Garfield Heights section of Anacostia.

In 1933 and 1934 Robinson worked for the Civilian Conservation Corps at a camp near Lynchburg, Virginia. (Note: Of the camps near Lynchburg, Camp Snowden is the most probable. Like other camps in Virginia, Snowden was segregated by race. Established in 1933 and continuing in operation until 1935, it contained about 200 men, all of them African-Americans from nearby jurisdictions, including Washington, D.C. Its main work was trail and road construction.)

In 1934 he married Gladys Ernestine Washington. Their children were John N. Jr. (born about 1935), twins: Robert and Roberta (born about 1937), Ronald (born about 1939 and called Pete), and Douglas, Blanche, Betty Anne (all born in 1940 or later). Until 1945 the family lived with Glady's grandparents in the Garfield Heights. Thereafter they lived in a house they bought across the street.

In 1935, after a brief stint as a laborer at the Navy Yard, Robinson took a job at St. Elizabeths Hospital. Over the next 35 years he worked his way up from kitchen helper, to cook, and finally supervisory cook. He retired in 1970. During the late 1930s and early 1940s he took a part-time job making backgrounds for two shops in the Capitol Photo Studios chain. He later said "I began to paint backgrounds for them using the medium of tempera, and covering a 6 x 8 canvas with a mixture of black and white paints, water, and glue. This extra work was a great help in raising a large family during the Depression and war years."

Robinson died on October 17, 1994. His wife, Gladys, died May 23, 2016.
