= Adolphus Ealey =

American curator, educator (1941–1992)

- Born: February 22, 1941; Atlanta, Georgia, U.S.
- Died: November 11, 1992 (aged 51); Washington, D.C., U.S.
- Education: Howard University, Académie de la Grande Chaumière, University of Wisconsin–Madison
- Occupations: Artist, curator, educator, writer, entrepreneur, art dealer

Adolphus Ealey (February 22, 1941 – November 11, 1992) was an American artist, curator, educator, writer, and entrepreneur. He was African-American and a noted Black art authority, and he was the longtime curator of the Barnett–Aden Collection of Black art.

== Early life and education ==
Adolphus Ealey was born on February 22, 1941, in Atlanta, Georgia. He attended Howard University (B.A. degree 1963) and studied under James V. Herring. He received a master's degree (1964) at Académie de la Grande Chaumière in Paris, and a Ph.D. in art from the University of Wisconsin.

== Career ==
"All things are interrelated and nourish one another. All cultures are interwoven."

— Adolphus Ealey (in 1991)

Ealey was a longtime curator of the Barnett–Aden Collection of Black art starting in 1969; the collection was formerly associated with Barnett-Aden Gallery and bequeathed to Ealey by James V. Herring. Later the collection was located at the Museum of African American Art in Tampa, Florida (which has since closed). He took an anthropological approach to the collection of objects, emphasized culture and organized them around a village concept.

Ealey was a professor at Washington Technical Institute (now University of the District of Columbia) from 1969 to 1971. He also taught art classes at Sharpe Health School in Washington, D.C., a school for children with disabilities, from 1972 to 1975. From 1976 to 1978, Ealey was the first director of the Afro-American Cultural and Historical Museum of Philadelphia (now the African American Museum in Philadelphia).

In 1985, he designed memorabilia for the first national celebration of Martin Luther King Jr. Day, commissioned by the King Center for Nonviolent Social Change; and it was said to have been personally approved by Coretta Scott King, the widow of Martin Luther King, Jr.

He was the president of Heritage Noir Inc. in 1983. Ealey had been friends with artist Alma W. Thomas.

== Death and legacy ==
He had AIDS and died of kidney failure on November 11, 1992, at Providence Hospital in Washington, D.C. He has artist files at the National Gallery of Art Library; and he is included in the public museum collection at the Baltimore Museum of Art.

== Exhibitions ==
- 1972, Reflections: the Afro-American Artist: an Exhibit of Paintings, Sculpture, and Graphics, group exhibition, Benton Convention Center, Winston-Salem, North Carolina
- 1973, Exhibition 73 (the D.C. Art Association), group exhibition, Anacostia Museum, and Smithsonian National Museum of African American History and Culture
- 1977, Black American Art from the Barnett Aden Collection, group exhibition, Frick Fine Arts Museum at the University of Pittsburgh
- 1979, Reflections of a Southern Heritage: 20th Century Black Artists of the Southeast, group exhibition, Gibbes Art Gallery, Charlestown, South Carolina

== Publications ==
- Ealey, Adolphus (Spring 1977). Lewis, Samella (ed.). "The Curator". Black Art: An International Quarterly. 1 (3).

== See also ==
- Evangeline Montgomery
- Guy McElroy
- Carol D. Lee
