= Nathaniel Parker Gage School =

- U.S. National Register of Historic Places
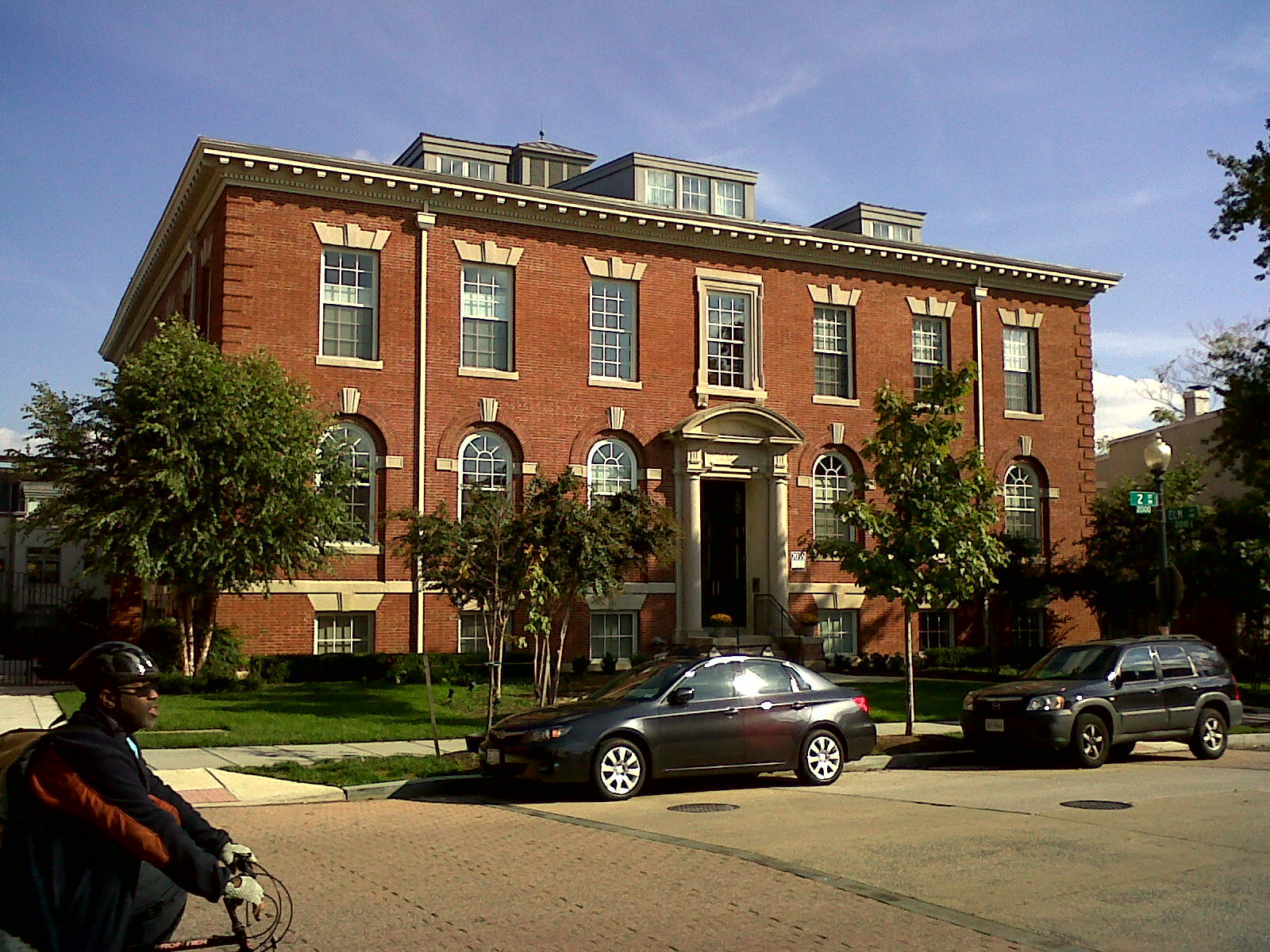
- Nathaniel Parker Gage School in 2011

- Location within Washington, D.C.
- Location: 2035 2nd St., NW; Washington, D.C.
- Coordinates: 38°55′03″N 77°00′51″W
- Built: 1904-1905
- Architect: Lemuel W. Norris
- Architectural style: Colonial Revival
- MPS: Public School Buildings of Washington, DC MPS
- NRHP reference No.: 08001064
- Added to NRHP: November 19, 2008

Nathaniel Parker Gage School is an historic structure located in the Bloomingdale neighborhood in the Northwest Quadrant of Washington, D.C. It was listed on the National Register of Historic Places in 2008. The building now houses condominiums.

== History ==
The Gage School was designed by Lemuel W. Norris in the high Colonial Revival style. It was built from 1904 to 1905. Snowden Ashford designed a complementary addition, which was built three years later. Students who came to this school lived in the LeDroit Park, Bloomingdale and the Eckington neighborhoods. It also served as community meeting and recreation facility.

== Parker Flats Condominiums ==
The former Gage school property has since been converted into a private condominium development, called the "Parker Flats" Designed by Architect David Haresign, AIA, Parker Flats is ranked among the top 12 Residential Designs for 2008. According to the AIA, "this old DC public school building near LeDroit Park in Northwest Washington had sat empty for more than 30 years. Today, the historic landmark is the centerpiece of a 92-unit condominium project that has catalyzed neighborhood revitalization. In addition to the complete restoration of the Gage School, the development includes two new flanking buildings that are in keeping with the architecture of the area’s early 20th century apartment buildings and row houses."
