= Lilian Thomas Burwell =

American painter (born 1927)

- Born: June 7, 1927 (age 98); Washington, D.C.
- Education: Pratt Institute, DC Teachers College, Catholic University
- Known for: sculpture, painting
- Website: burwellstudios.com

Lilian Thomas Burwell (born 1927) is a Washington, DC sculptor and painter whose shaped paintings often blur the line between the two disciplines. Her artwork uses abstraction to create a personal response to the natural world.

== Early life and education ==
Lilian Thomas Burwell was born in Washington, DC on June 7, 1927. Born into a creative family, her father was a photographer and her mother was an artist and craftsperson, and both taught art. Her aunt, Hilda Wilkinson Brown, was a renowned painter. She was educated at the prestigious High School of Music and Art in New York City and Dunbar High School in Washington, DC. She then went on to complete her studies at Pratt Institute in 1946 and earned a B.A. from DC Teachers College and M.F.A. in 1975 from Catholic University.

== Career ==
Lilian Thomas Burwell studied abstract expressionism with famed artist Benjamin Abramowitz in the mid-1960s and she worked in this genre until the early 1980s. Following the death of her mother, her work moved into the sculptural with hand carved wood and "paintings as sculpture".

She is a longtime member of the Washington, D.C. and African-American arts communities, and maintained close friendships with the painters Felrath Hines, Alma Thomas, and Sylvia Snowden.

Burwell has exhibited in over 20 exhibits in the United States and abroad, including the Smithsonian Institution's Anacostia Community Museum, the Chicago Museum of Science and Industry, the National Museum of Women in the Arts, the Baltimore Museum of Art, and the Martin Luther King Jr. Memorial Library. In 1997, Hampton University Museum held a 30-year retrospective of her work and published From Painting to Painting as Sculpture: the Journey of Lilian Thomas Burwell.

Her curatorial career spans 15 years and includes founding director of the Alma Thomas Memorial Gallery in Shaw for the D.C. Department of Education, curatorial director of the Sumner Museum and Archives, designer of arts curriculum for DCPS, art teacher at Pratt Institute NYC, head of visual arts department at the Duke Ellington School of the Arts, and adjunct art teacher as recently as 2012 at Anne Arundel Community College. She curated the exhibition "The Art of a People: Finding a Way Out of No Way" at the Banneker-Douglass Museum in 2015. In addition, Burwell has 30 years of graphic design experience, including work as a publications and exhibits specialist for the U.S. Department of Commerce.
