= Benjamin Abramowitz =

American painter and sculptor

- Born: Benjamin Abramowitz; July 3, 1917; Brooklyn, New York
- Died: November 21, 2011 (aged 94); Washington, D.C.
- Education: Brooklyn Museum Art School and National Academy Museum and School
- Known for: Painting, Drawing, Sculpture
- Movement: Expressionism; Realism; Postwar and Contemporary; Abstract art
- Website: benjaminabramowitz.com

Benjamin Abramowitz (also known as "Ben Hoffman" during the late 1930s and early 1940s) was an American painter, printmaker, and sculptor. First recognized for his contribution at age 19 as senior artist with the Federal Art Project of the Works Progress Administration (WPA) in New York City, he is among the most respected Washington, D.C., artists of the past century.

== Life and career ==
Abramowitz was born in Brooklyn, New York in 1917 to Russian immigrants. He studied life drawing at the Brooklyn Museum School, and had his first solo exhibition there at the age of 16. He attended the National Academy of Design. In 1936 he joined the Work Projects Administration (W.P.A.) using the name of Ben Hoffman and was a teacher, mural assistant, senior printmaker and painter. The Metropolitan Museum in New York holds eleven lithographs from the young artist.

In 1941, Abramowitz moved to Washington, D.C., taking on U.S. government graphic assignments. He chose to make Greenbelt his base for both home and studio for more than half a century. The postwar years were a time of critical personal and artistic evolution for him. By day a lithographer, each and every night driven by discipline, he drew and painted.

By the time he was in his early 30s, Abramowitz had become a celebrated star in the growing Washington, D.C.-Baltimore regional art scene. From the 1940s on, critics, curators and collectors enthusiastically sought out his work. His work began to be purchased for major regional collections among them, the Baltimore Museum of Art and the Phillips Collection. The Corcoran Gallery of Art selected his work annually for its biennial exhibitions.

By the mid-20th century, Abramowitz, was recognized not only as a painter, but also as a teacher and "art coach" throughout the Washington metropolitan area. Among his students was the D.C. painter and sculptor Lilian Thomas Burwell. The Ford Foundation sent him throughout the country, lecturing, conducting seminars and critiques as artist-in-residence. All the while, he kept journals and maintained an active correspondence with critics, curators and students.

By the 1970s, he diverged from painting, and turned to making wall works and freestanding sculptures. Additionally he designed four books illustrating the basic principles of the creative experience. Until his mid-80s, when diminishing vision essentially prevented him from continuing to work, he created steadily and with the same discipline and vigor that marked his earlier years.

Abramowitz' distinguished lifework has been cited in numerous prestigious biographical volumes. The National Archives of American Art holds hundreds of papers, letters and other materials.

== Legacy ==
The modern art movement in the Washington region started mid-century, and the first was the work of Ben Abramowitz," said Walter Hopps, museum director and curator, at a memorial service for artist Gene Davis at the National Gallery of Art in 1985.

The prolific and complex achievements of master artist Benjamin Abramowitz in painting, sculpture, works on paper in drawing and watercolor span almost eight decades. Noted for his compelling aesthetic vision, Abramowitz has been hailed by critics, curators and collectors as one of the most important artists of the 20th century. His vast body of work resists categorization. Working outside the geographical spotlight of the New York art world, Abramowitz' recognized mastery has been remarkably overlooked.

== Notable exhibitions ==
- "Undiscovered Color: Paintings of Benjamin Abramowitz 1960-1970," Archer Modern, Washington, DC, 2013
- "Out of the Vault," National Women's Democratic Club, Washington, DC, 2012
- "WPA Graphic Works from the Amity Art Foundation Collection," Juniata College Museum of Art, Huntingdon, PA, 2008
- "From Maryland to the Republic of Congo," ART in Embassies Exhibition, United States Embassy, Brazzaville, Republic of Congo, 2007
- "Heart of DC," John A. Wilson Building, City Hall Art Collection, Washington, DC, 2007
- "Benjamin Abramowitz Works on Paper," Hemphill Fine Arts, 2006
- ART in Embassies Program, United States Embassy, Sarajevo, 2006
- "30 Years Later: A Group Show of Current Works by Selected Washington Artists of the 50s and 60s," Gallery K, Washington, DC June 1989
- "Benjamin Abramowitz: Painting, Sculpture, Drawing," Middendorf/Lane Downtown Gallery, Washington DC November, 1982
- "Eminent Washington Artists: 3rd Annual Invitational Exhibit," The Art Barn, Washington, DC, January 1980
- The Washington Project for the Arts, Washington, DC, 1979
- The Jefferson Place Gallery, 1972
- "Benjamin Abramowitz," The Jefferson Place Gallery, March 1971
- "Washington: Twenty Years," The Baltimore Museum of Art, May 1970
- The Corcoran Gallery of Art, Washington, DC, 1970
- The Philadelphia Museum of Art, Philadelphia, PA, March 1965
- "Abramowitz," R Street Gallery, Washington, DC, 1964
- "Washington Artists Exhibition No. 20: Benjamin Abramowitz," The Corcoran Gallery of Art, November 1963
- Solo exhibition, Baltimore Museum of Art, Baltimore, MD, 1959
- "3 Maryland Artists: Benjamin Abramowitz, Jane Frank & Lowell Nesbitt," The Baltimore Museum of Art, Baltimore, MD, November 1958
- "Paintings by Benjamin Abramowitz," The Dupont Gallery of Art, Washington, DC, November 1954
- "Eighteen Washington Artists" The Barnett Aden Gallery, Washington, DC, October 1953
- "The Eighth Annual Area Exhibition," The Corcoran Gallery of Art, Washington, DC, November 1953
- "Trio: One-man shows by prominent Washington artists," Watkins Gallery, American University, Washington, DC, January 1953
- "Trends in American Drawing," Howard University Department of Fine Art, Washington, DC, December 1952
- "Maryland Artists 20th Annual Exhibition," The Baltimore Museum of Art, 1952
- Solo exhibition, The Whyte Gallery, Washington, DC, April 1952
- "Painters of Expressionistic Abstraction," The Phillips Gallery, Washington, DC, March 1952
- The Corcoran Gallery of Art, Washington, DC, November 1951
- The Whyte Gallery, Washington, DC, June 1951
- The Corcoran Gallery of Art, Washington, DC, February 1951
- Solo exhibition, The Baltimore Museum of Art, Baltimore, MD, 1951
- The Metropolitan Museum of Art, New York, NY, December 1950
- The Corcoran Gallery of Art, Washington, DC, November 1949
- The Dupont Gallery, Washington, DC, 1949
- "Third Annual Exhibition of Work by Artists of Washington & Vicinity," The Corcoran Gallery of Art, Washington, DC, November 1948
- "Abramowitz," The Barnett Aden Gallery, Washington, DC, April 1948
- The Barnett Aden Gallery, Washington, DC, September 1947
- "Fifteenth Annual Exhibition of Maryland Artists," The Baltimore Museum of Art, Baltimore, MD, January 1947
- "Artists of Washington and Vicinity," The Corcoran Gallery of Art, Washington, DC, November 1946
- Solo exhibition, Howard University Art Gallery, Washington, DC, March 1946
- "The Eighth Metropolitan State Art Contest," The National Collection of Fine Arts, Smithsonian Institution, Washington, DC, November 1945
- "Exhibition of Paintings by Artists of Washington, Baltimore and Vicinity," The Phillips Memorial Gallery, Washington, DC, January 1945
- National (Smithsonian) Museum, Washington, DC, 1945
- Baltimore Art Museum, Baltimore, MD, 1945
- Phillips Memorial Gallery, Washington, DC, 1944
- Metropolitan Museum, Hearn Permanent Collection, 1941
- "American Artists' Congress Fifth Annual Competitive Exhibition," ACA Gallery, New York, NY, June 1940
- National Gallery of Fine Arts (Smithsonian Institution), Washington, DC, 1940
- New School for Social Research, New York, NY, 1939
- Rockefeller Center, New York, NY, 1939
- ACA Gallery, New York, NY, 1938
- Brooklyn Museum, Brooklyn, NY, 1933

== Notable Collections ==
- Metropolitan Museum of Art
- Phillips Collection
- Georgetown University
- U.S.Department of State
- District of Columbia Art Bank
- Howard University
- Newark Museum
