= Alonzo J. Aden =

American art historian and gallerist

Alonzo J. Aden (May 6, 1906 – October 13, 1961) was an art historian and gallerist. He served as curator of "Hall of Negro Life" at the Texas Centennial Exposition, the first major Black arts and culture exhibit at a world's fair, and the American Negro Exposition in Chicago. Aden co-founded with James V. Herring the Barnett-Aden Gallery, one of the first Black-owned art galleries in the United States.

== Early life and education ==
Alonzo “Lonnie” Aden was born on May 6, 1906, in Spartanburg, South Carolina. He was the oldest son of Ephraim Aden (1859–1917), a hotelier, and Naomi Barnett (1883–1956), a school teacher. Aden had blonde hair until early adulthood and green eyes.

In 1920, Aden was sent to Washington, D.C., to live with his uncle, James Aden, a porter, and his wife Laura. After graduating from Armstrong High School, he attended Hampton Institute (now Hampton University).

In June 1927, he wrote to W.E.B. DuBois to ask him for a job writing for The Crisis. That fall he started classes at Howard University, and enrolled in an art history class taught by James V. Herring. In 1933, Aden graduated from Howard with a bachelor's degree in education.

== Career ==
=== Howard University Art Gallery ===
In 1930, Aden began working in the university art gallery as an undergraduate assistant to Herring. He would rise through the ranks and eventually become curator of the Howard University Gallery of Art.

In 1935, Aden received a Rockefeller Foundation scholarship for a sixteen-week apprenticeship in the Visual Education Department at the Buffalo Museum of Science. He took a leave of absence from Howard to complete the apprenticeship.

In 1936, Aden was “on loan from Howard to the United States Department of Commerce” to work as the curator of “Hall of Negro Life” at the Texas Centennial Exposition, the first major Black arts and culture exhibit at a world's fair. The Hall of Negro Life attracted more than 400,000 visitors.

in 1938, Aden received a travel grant from the American Association Museums to study in Europe. He visited museums, galleries, and other artistic spaces in Berlin, Brussels, Cologne, Dresden, Florence, London, Munich, Rome, and Venice.

The following year, he returned to the United States and the Howard art gallery. In 1940, Howard professor Alain Locke, who chaired the Art Committee for the American Negro Exposition, invited Aden to serve as curator of the exhibition held in the Tanner Hall Galleries. Aden was commissioned by the National Gallery of Art to deliver a series "curatorial lectures" in 1941 and 1942.

In 1943, Aden resigned as head of the Howard University Art Gallery after ten years of service as curator.

=== Barnett-Aden Gallery ===
Aden and Herring co-founded the Barnett-Aden Gallery in 1943. The Barnett-Aden gallery was named in honor of Aden's mother, Naomi Barnett-Aden, who was a "benefactor" of the gallery by giving $1,000 to her son's new venture.

Barnett-Aden is recognized as one of the first major Black-owned art galleries in the United States. During its existence, Barnett-Aden hosted nearly 200 gallery events and exhibited more than 400 artists. The gallery maintained a sales policy where each artist retained all the money for their art sale, yet were required to contribute at least one object to the Barnett-Aden art collection.

== Personal life ==
Aden and Herring, who was 19 years older than Aden, were business and life partners. The pair lived together beginning in 1929, in a home on 2nd Street in Washington, DC. Beginning in 1933, Aden and Herring are listed as co-owners of a Randolph Street rowhouse, the site of the Barnett-Aden Gallery, although they did not move into their new home until 1934. The pair were stylish Washington, DC socialites, entertaining several times a week. Aden favored tailored suits, and Herring sported a cape and cane during winter months, and a white dinner jacket during the summer social season.

On October 13, 1961, Aden died after suffering an apparent heart attack at the home he shared with Herring.

== Legacy ==
After Aden's death, the Barnett-Aden Gallery began to decline and slowly ceased its exhibitions schedule. Aden's partner, James Herring, died in 1969, and the gallery closed.

In 1989, a portion of the Barnett-Aden Collection, approximately 130 artworks, was sold for six million dollars to the Florida Endowment Fund for Higher Education. At the time, this was the largest recorded price for a Black art collection acquisition.

In 1998, Robert L. Johnson, founder of BET, purchased a lot from the Barnett-Aden Collection. In 2015, Johnson donated select works from the Collection to the National Museum of African American History and Culture.

As a permanent legacy to Aden and Barnett, Cultural Tourism DC erected a Barnett Aden Gallery memorial marker on the African American Heritage Trail in Washington, DC.
