= Hilda Rue Wilkinson Brown =

African American artist (1894–1981)

- Born: 1894; Washington, District of Columbia
- Died: 1981 (aged 86–87)
- Education: Howard University; Columbia University; Cooper Union; The National Academy of Design; Art Student's League

Hilda Rue Wilkinson Brown (1894–1981) was an artist and teacher from Washington, D.C. Brown was involved in art education, developing curriculum that challenged the typical mimetic approach of teaching in favor of more individual creativity. The focus of Brown's life was her career as an educator, but she was also a prolific artist in her own right. She made illustrations for African American publications such as The Brownie's Book and Crisis magazine. She was also a painter and printmaker. Her prints are included in the collections of the Metropolitan Museum of art and the Art Institute of Chicago.

== Personal life ==
Hilda Rue Wilkinson Brown was born in Washington D.C in 1894. Brown is the only one of five grandchildren to have remained in Washington, D.C., where her great-grandmother first moved after being freed from slavery in 1835.

In 1929 she married a physician named Schley Brown, and in 1937 the two purchased a brownstone on 237 Rhode Island Avenue in LeDroit Park. This neighborhood would become the subject of many of Brown's paintings. Because of its proximity to local schools, LeDroit Park attracted black educators and scholars, fostering a community of intellectuals. One such community member was the renowned African American writer Langston Hughes, who lived in LeDroit Park in the 1920s. Although he left before Brown moved to the neighborhood, she was acquainted with his family.

Brown spent summers at her second home in Oak Bluffs, Martha's Vineyard until 1980. At the time, Oak Bluffs was a popular vacation destination among upper and middle class African Americans, making Brown a part of both this local community and the one in LeDroit Park.

In her spare time she enjoyed gardening and making pottery and clay sculptures. According to her niece, Brown had learned how to sculpt and make pottery when she attended Columbia University, and would gift these objects to friends or use them herself to decorate her home. A sociable woman, Brown was also a member of the Coo Coos, a local chapter of the social organization The Girl Friends, a social club for African American women.

Hilda Wilkinson Brown and Schley Brown did not have children of their own, but they were very close to Hilda's maternal niece, artist Lilian Thomas Burwell. Schley Brown was named Burwell's godfather when he and Hilda married. Burwell attended Pratt Institute, a university in Brooklyn, New York, on a scholarship. Hilda and Schley Brown financially supported Burwell's education by paying the portion of her tuition that was not covered by the scholarship, and by purchasing her art supplies.

Burwell's parents had concerns about how she could achieve financial stability in the unpredictable art world, but Brown persuaded them to allow Burwell to continue her passion by suggesting she teach art. Lilian Thomas Burwell guest curated Hilda Wilkinson Brown's posthumous retrospective at the Howard University Gallery in 1983. Burwell has reflected on her aunt's life and career in articles for Washington History and The International Review of African American Art.

At the end of her life Brown became legally blind, leaving her bedridden until the time of her death. She died of congestive heart failure in 1981 at the age of 86 in her home in Washington, D.C.

== Education ==
Hilda Wilkinson Brown graduated high school from Miner Normal School, which was later renamed Miner Teacher's College and now called the University of the District of Columbia. According to her niece, Brown also attended M Street High School, but the amount of time she spent here is not specified. She earned her Bachelor's in Education at Howard University and her Masters from Columbia University. She also studied at Cooper Union, The National Academy of Design and the Art Students League in New York City.

== Career ==
=== Miner Normal School ===
In 1923, after graduating from Cooper Union in New York City, Brown started her first teaching job at her alma mater—Miner Normal School in Washington D.C. There she coordinated a two-year art history, design and fine arts curriculum and eventually chaired the department. In 1929 she integrated fine art and industrial arts into the school's teacher training program. From 1932 until her retirement in 1961, Brown created set and costume designs for the school's theater productions, created graphics for the school, and designed its seal. She was an assistant professor at the time of her retirement.

=== Public schools ===
While she was heavily invested in Miner Normal School, Brown also worked with public schools throughout Washington D.C. In 1933 she introduced the "modern" approach to art education in segregated Negro schools, which championed individual creativity rather than the mimetic approach to teaching art that was usually taught. She lectured at Howard University and other schools throughout Washington D.C. on African art heritage, art in interior design, and art education for elementary school teachers.

=== Other ===
Brown was on the first board of directors of the Barnett-Aden Gallery, a private art gallery in Washington, DC, which was one of the first galleries to show work by black artists.

== Artistic career ==
Hilda Wilkinson Brown was a highly skilled painter and printmaker, but she was aware of the restrictions being a woman in her era placed on her art making. Lilian Thomas Burwell recalls that Brown felt women's domestic responsibilities prevented them from making art as full-heartedly and self-centeredly as male artists. While Brown recognized the limitations this posed to her and other female artists' chances of recognition, she was passionate about domestic work and teaching, and was unwilling to compromise these passions to advance her artistic career.

Brown kept only a small number of lithographs and sketches, most of which are artist's proofs. The graphite drawing Oak Bluffs in the collection of the Art Institute of Chicago and the lithograph The Family in the collection of the Metropolitan Museum of Art are rare in that they survive. To further complicate a full understanding of her artistic output, most of her pieces are undated and unsigned. A painting titled Third Street was found behind a furnace in Brown's basement after her death. This seeming disregard for her art attests to both her high standards and the fact that she was not seeking recognition as an artist. Although Brown's paintings indicate talent, Burwell has suggested that Brown may have seen art making as a mere hobby.

=== Painting ===
Brown's oil paintings reflect an interest in the community and familiar settings around her. She painted still lifes, portraits and neighborhood scenes within LeDroit Park. During her summers in Martha's Vineyard the artist painted local landscapes in watercolor.

==== University Neighborhood ====
University Neighborhood was painted from a window at Miner Normal School looking east toward McMillan Reservoir. Brown rendered the route she took walking to and from work each day in an abstract form. It is not an exact painting of the street. Rather, Brown selected particular buildings and omitted others, rendering the path in geometric fragments.

==== Side Street ====
Side Street was painted from an elevated deck outside of the artist's kitchen. This painting shows the street, looking north toward Third and T street. The actual layout of the road is abstracted to prioritize an interesting composition over geographical accuracy.

==== Langston or Young Man Studying ====
Sometimes titled Langston, Young Man Studying is a portrait of Langston Hughes. For a brief period in the 1920s, Langston Hughes lived in Hilda Wilkinson Brown's neighborhood with his family. It is unknown if he actually sat for the portrait. The image was owned by the Howard University Gallery of Art at one time.

==== Portrait of a Girl ====
The subject of this painting is unknown, although the likeness of the hair style and chin, and the intense stare suggests it may be a self-portrait.

==== Ada ====
This painting of a woman at work in a kitchen reflects the artist's sensitivity toward domestic labor as the artist herself enjoyed spending time in her kitchen preparing meals for others.

=== Commercial illustration and printmaking ===
For a short time Brown created prints and illustrations for significant African American publications. In the 1920s she worked as a main commercial illustrator for The Brownies' Book, a magazine for African American children edited by W.E.B. DuBois and Jesse Redmond. Hilda Wilkinson Brown and Lucille Rogers designed the cover for the June, 1920 cover of The Crisis, another African American publication founded by DuBois. In 1940 she made six linoleum block prints for the first edition of E. Franklin Frazier's book The Negro Family in the United States. The author, her brother-in-law, wrote in her copy that her work "made evident what (he) tried to write".

=== Style ===
Even Brown's artistic production reflects her passion for education. In a review of her exhibition at Howard University Gallery, Paul Richard of The Washington Post said "hers are images that teach." Curator of the National Museum of American Art Merry Forester wrote that Brown "grappled with the problems of Fauvism, Cubism and Expressionism," reflected the influence of Realism, Precisionism and Conceptualism, and that "she worked in a style that only few in her time were courageous enough to use."

== Selected exhibitions ==
- Exhibited at Howard University Gallery of Art, 1932.
- Exhibited in the First Annual Metropolitan State Art Contest at the United States National Museum (now the National Gallery of Art), 1936.
- Ada was exhibited at the Exhibition of Fine Arts Productions by American Negroes in the Hall of Negro Life at the Texas Centennial Exposition, 1936.
- Exhibited in Art of the American Negro at Howard University, 1937.
- Still Life with Tulips was exhibited at Howard University Gallery of Art in 1940.
- Hilda Wilkinson Brown: A Washington Artist Rediscovered. Posthumous Retrospective at Howard University, 1983.

== Selected collections ==
- Oak Bluffs from the collection of the Art Institute of Chicago
- The Family from the collection of the Metropolitan Museum of Art
- Third and Rhode Island in the collection of the Smithsonian American Art Museum
- Her work was included in the Barnett-Aden Gallery Collection.
- Ada was in the collection of Hampton University, but was later donated to the Harmon Foundation.
