= Herman Maril =

American painter

- Born: 1908; Baltimore, Maryland
- Died: 1986 (aged 77–78); Hyannis, MA
- Education: Maryland Institute College of Art
- Occupations: Artist and professor

Herman Maril (1908–1986) was an artist and emeritus professor of painting at the University of Maryland.

== Biography ==
Maril was born in Baltimore, Maryland in 1908 and studied at the Maryland Institute of Fine Arts. He had 40 one-man exhibitions in his career with his first in 1935 at the Howard University Gallery of Art, and taught at the University of Maryland for more than 31 years. Examples of his work are in the collections of the Smithsonian American Art Museum as well as National Portrait Gallery and The Phillips Collection, all in Washington D.C., as well as numerous national and international museums including The Whitney Museum and The Metropolitan Museum of Art in New York. A major retrospective of his paintings was mounted at The Baltimore Museum of Art in the mid-1960s. Marking the centennial of Maril's birth, the Provincetown Art Association and Museum and Walters Art Museum in Baltimore exhibited a major retrospective of his work in 2008. In 1983, the Wichita Art Museum also showed a retrospective. Maril, who died in 1986, has had continuous major gallery representation in New York since the 1930s. His artwork is currently shown at Debra Force Fine Art in New York City and the LewAllen Galleries in Santa Fe.

== Style ==
Maril was a modernist painter whose style reduced figures and objects to their essence. Subjects ranged from urban landscapes to coastal seascapes. Maril's art demonstrated a consistent development: it was based in nature, abstractly organized, and simplified in form and content. The noted artist and critic Olin Dows, wrote about the then 26-year-old artist, "Herman Maril's painting is reserved, and, like most good painting, it is simple. He is interested in the essentials. Each picture has its core; each is beautifully conceived and organized. It is clothed in a certain poetry."
