= Eckington (Washington, D.C.) =

- Neighborhood of Washington, D.C.
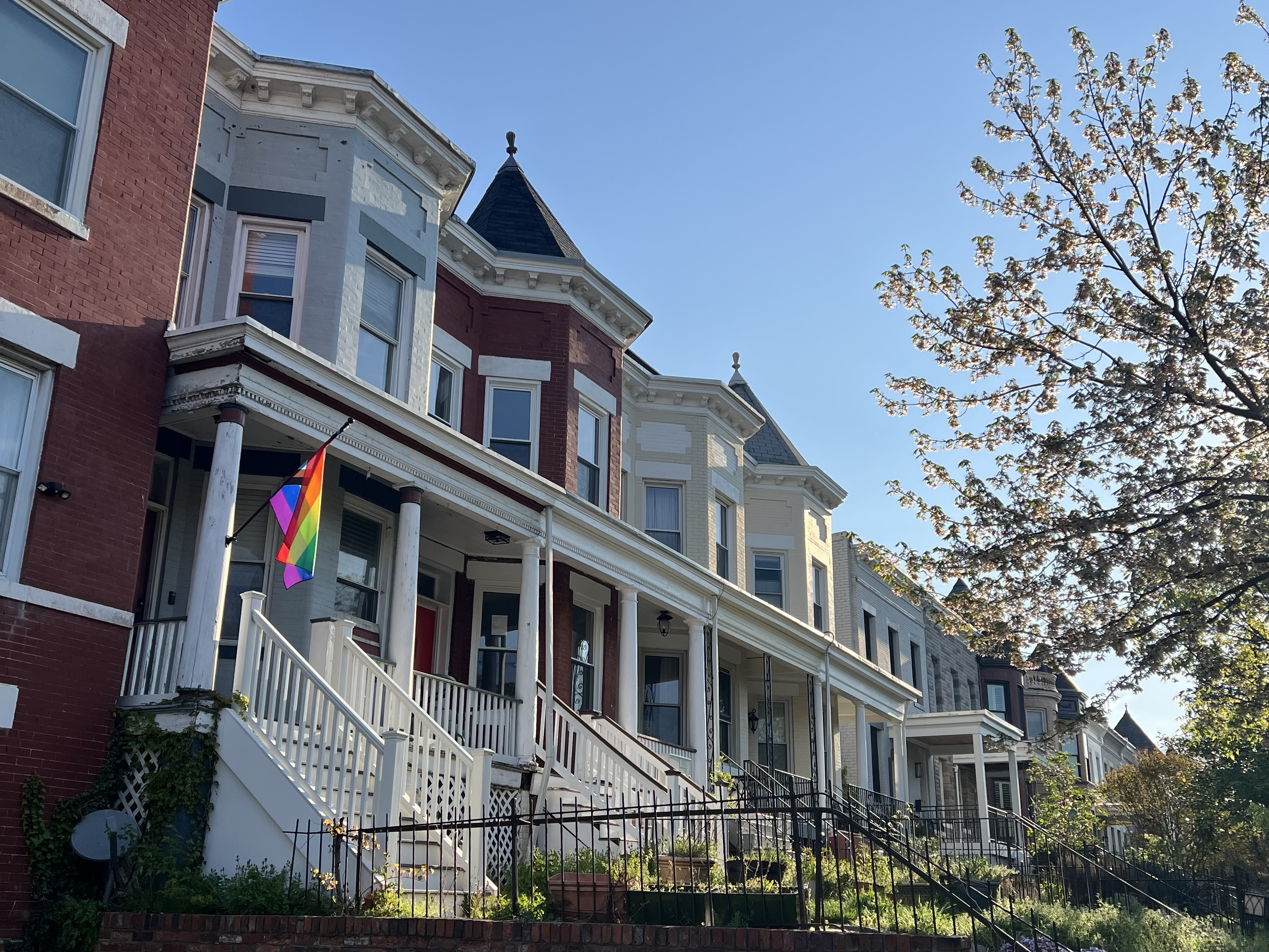
- Houses in Eckington (2026)

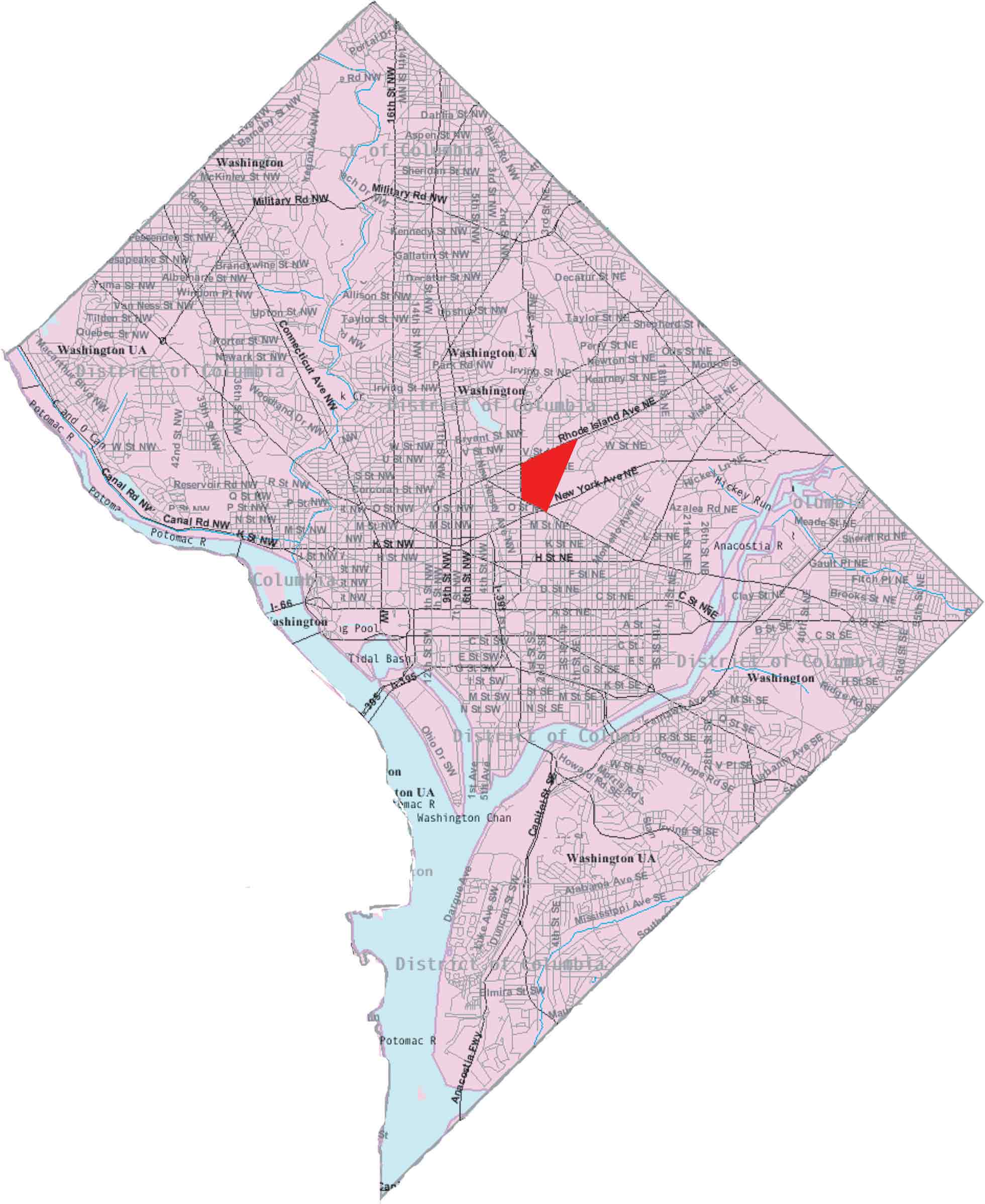
- Eckington within the District of Columbia
- Coordinates: 38.9153°N 77.0017°W
- Country: United States
- District: Washington, D.C.
- Ward: Ward 5

Government
  - Councilmember: Zachary Parker
- Postal code: ZIP code

Eckington is a neighborhood in Northeast Washington, D.C., located south of the Prospect Hill and Glenwood Cemeteries. Eckington is less than one mile (1.6 km) southeast of Howard University and exactly one mile north of the United States Capitol. Eckington is also the home of the District of Columbia office of Sirius XM Radio.

Eckington is bordered by:

- Rhode Island Avenue and the Edgewood neighborhood to the north
- North Capitol Street and the Bloomingdale neighborhood to the west
- Florida Avenue and the Truxton Circle and NoMa neighborhoods to the south and
- The Metro rail Red Line and the Metro's Brentwood Yard to the east

The closest metro stations serving Eckington are NoMa–Gallaudet U Station, located south of Eckington, and Rhode Island Avenue–Brentwood Station, located northeast of Eckington.

== History ==
The land that became Eckington was the country home of Joseph Gales Jr., owner of the National Intelligencer newspaper and mayor of Washington from 1827 to 1830. Gales bought the Northeast tract in 1815, and in 1830 erected a two-story house on the hilltop, about where Third and U Streets intersect today. Gales named his estate Eckington after his birthplace in England.

During the American Civil War, the house was used as a hospital for the 7th Regiment of New York. After the war, Eckington, commonly known as Gales Woods, was a popular picnic ground.

In 1887, the Eckington estate was bought by George Truesdell and his wife Frances, who subdivided the property, improved it for habitation, sold lots, and built several houses. Truesdell undertook extensive grading operations to level the landscape of his 87-acre (350,000 m^{2}) Eckington subdivision. He laid down water and sewer pipes, paved streets in asphalt and concrete, and erected a stand pipe near the old Gales house. A steam pump brought water to the stand pipe, which distributed water throughout the new neighborhood. Truesdell erected five "pretty cottages" which, according to an 1888 newspaper account, were "all fitted up as city houses," with steam heat and hot and cold running water. Eckington was wired for electricity in 1889, two years before electricity was installed in the White House. In three years, Truesdell spent $500,000 improving the subdivision.

The contractor for Truesdell's houses was John H. Lane, who moved from Dupont Circle into one of those houses at 1725 Third Street. From 1889 to 1897, Lane developed nearly 20 properties in Eckington. None of Truesdell's original five houses exists today, although several detached houses from the late 19th century, by Lane and others, dot the streets of Eckington. The first three decades of the 20th century brought a boom in rowhouse construction to Eckington as it did in many parts of the District of Columbia.

Truesdell placed restrictive covenants in the deeds of Eckington's residential properties that required that each house cost at least $2,000 and be set back 15 feet (4.6 m) from the building line. There was to be no manufacturing. The Union Army veteran did not place racial restrictions in the deeds, although as late as 1930, there were no African American families living in Eckington.

The Eckington and Soldiers' Home Railway began service on October 17, 1888. It was Washington's first electric railway and followed by just a few months the first practical electric railway in Richmond, Virginia. The line ran from Seventh Street and New York Avenue NW to Fourth and T Streets NE in Eckington, then was extended in 1889, up Fourth Street to Michigan Avenue and The Catholic University of America.

Col. Truesdell's subdivision straddled the narrow tracks of the Metropolitan Branch of the B&O Railroad. The Met Branch was a line that brought commuters into the city from Maryland beginning in 1873. In 1888, the B&O bought 13 acres (53,000 m^{2}) just north of Florida Avenue and built a passenger station. Passengers were to disembark and ride the new electric line into the city. A few years later, the B&O built a huge freight depot next to the passenger station. This freight center spurred the development of manufacturing and warehousing along the west side of the tracks from Florida Avenue north to Rhode Island Avenue, Truesdell's covenants notwithstanding. The National Biscuit Company (Nabisco) was at 4th and S Streets and Judd and Detweiler printers was at Florida Avenue and Eckington Place. There were as many as 20 warehouses, mostly for groceries and home and building supplies. When the tracks were greatly expanded after the construction of Union Station, the east side of Eckington disappeared under them, including two of Truesdell's original houses.

In 1907, a bridge at 4th and T St. NE was built over the tracks to connect Eckington with the Brentwood neighborhood to the east. It was designed to carry motor traffic and pedestrians. A trolley connection at the west end of the bridge stopped in 1962, and the bridge was demolished in the late 1960s.

Although the streetcar had been a community center for both Eckington and Bloomingdale, the adjacent neighborhood to the west, after the streetcar line was removed in the 1950s North Capitol Street was dug into a trench to facilitate high-speed, high-volume traffic. The entrenched highway created a stark separation between Eckington from Bloomingdale. North Capitol Street remains noisy and difficult to cross; this, along with the railroad tracks on its east, gives Eckington its relatively isolated quality.
