= Bernice Cross =

American painter

- Born: August 22, 1912; Iowa City, Iowa
- Died: July 23, 1996 (aged 83); Washington, D.C.
- Education: Wilmington Academy, Corcoran School of Art, Phillips Gallery School of Art
- Spouse(s): Married (1937) to James Moore McLaughlin and later divorced.

Bernice Cross (1912–1996) was an American artist and art instructor born in Iowa City, Iowa, who was based in Washington, D.C. for most of her professional career. Known for her originality, creative imagination, sense of humor, and love of fantasy, she painted with a deceptive simplicity and handled color and form with subtlety and a sure touch.

== Early life and education ==
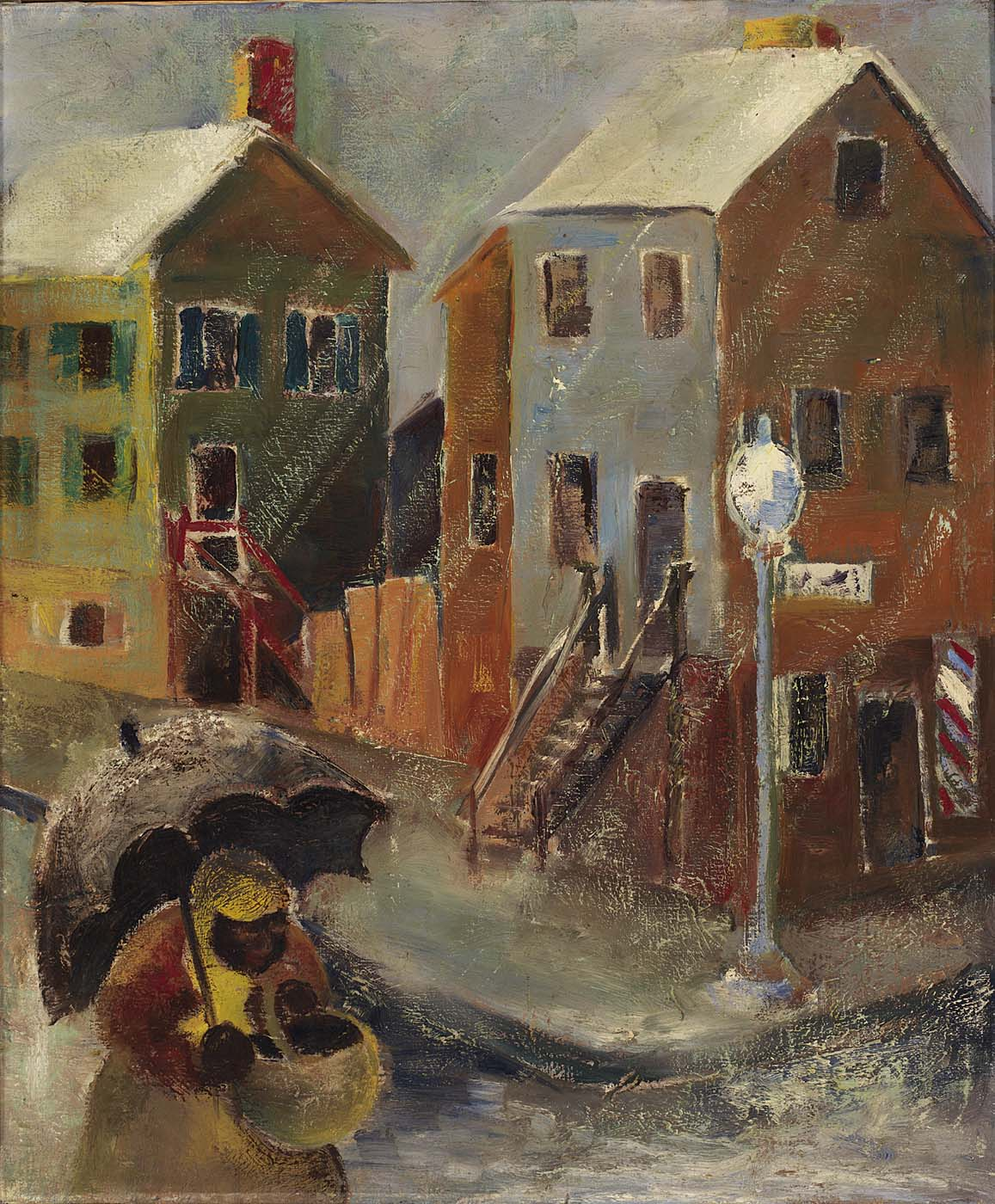
Bernice Cross, Georgetown Corner in the Rain, ca. 1934, oil on canvas, 24 by 20 1/8 inches (610 mm × 510 mm), Smithsonian American Art Museum

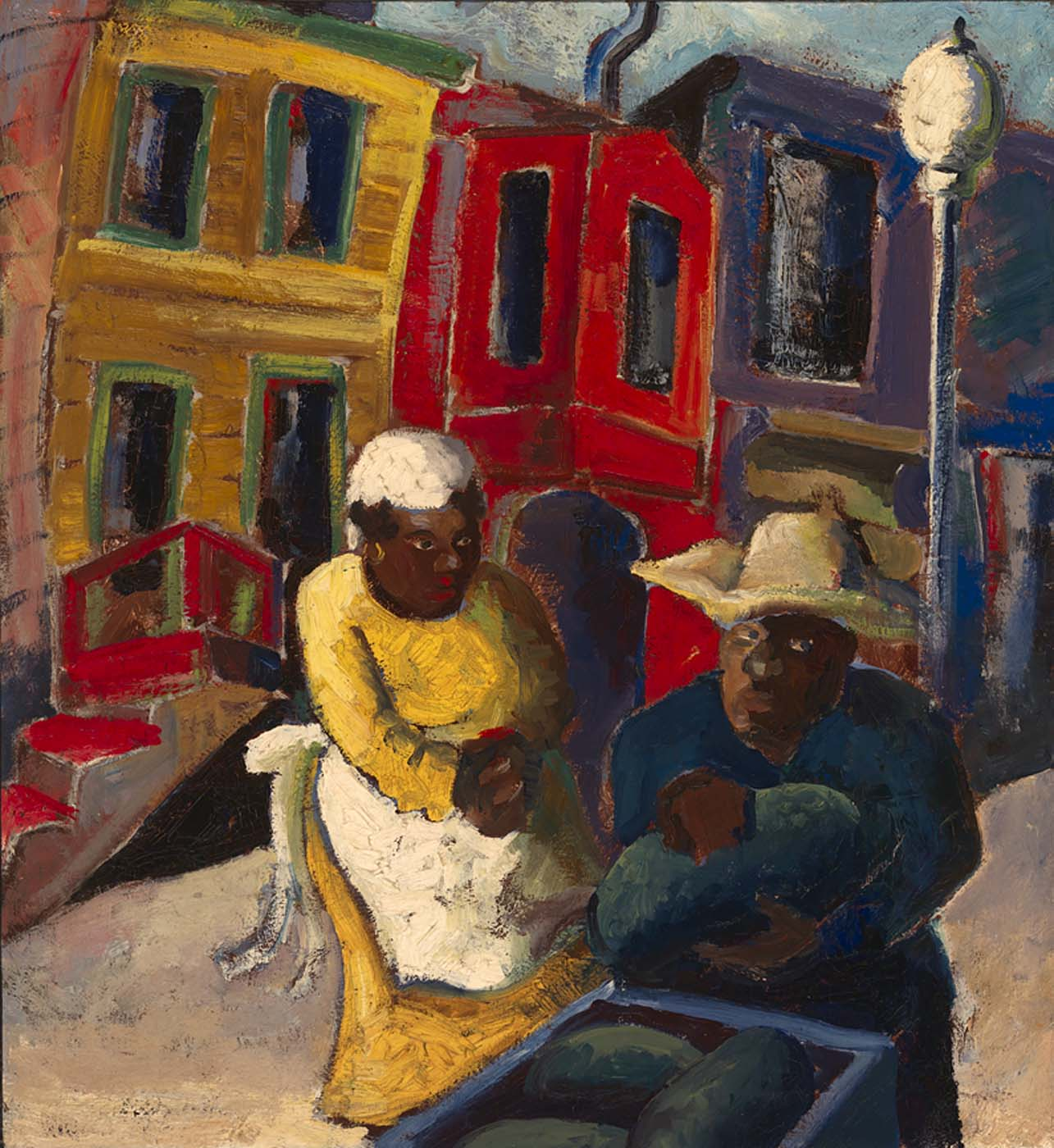
Bernice Cross, Melon Vendor, ca. 1934, oil on canvas 24 1/8 by 18 1/8 inches (610 mm × 460 mm), Smithsonian American Art Museum

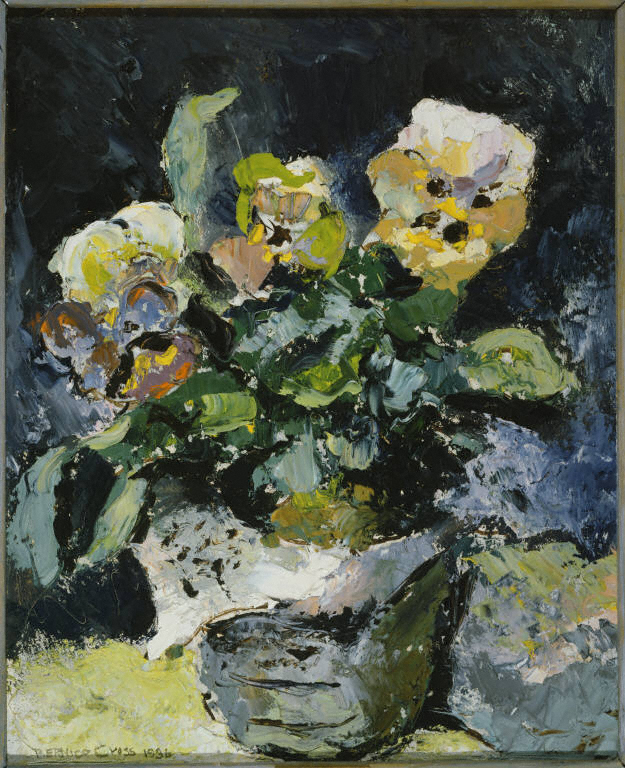
Bernice Cross, Pansies, 1936, oil on canvas board 14 5/8 by 12 inches (370 mm × 300 mm), acquired 1937, The Phillips Collection, Washington, D.C.

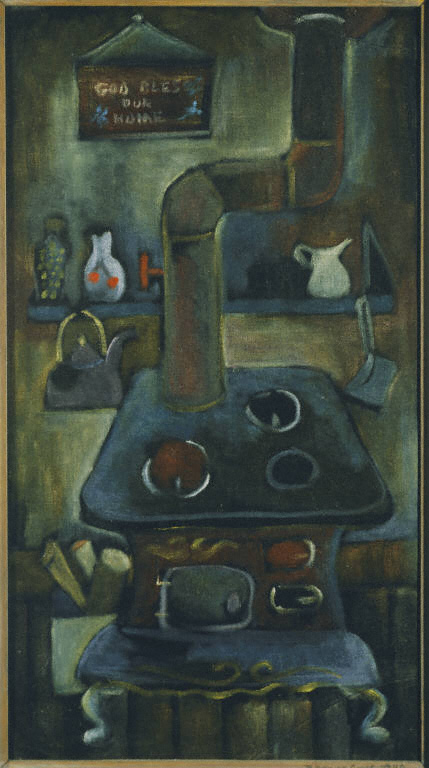
Bernice Cross, The Little Dove's Stove, 1940, oil on canvas board 18 by 10 inches (460 mm × 250 mm), acquired 1940, The Phillips Collection, Washington, D.C.

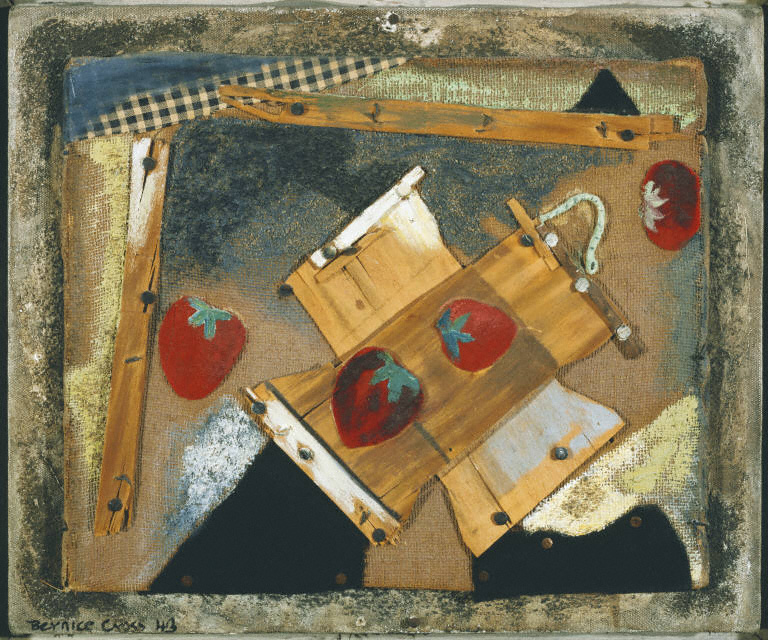
Bernice Cross; Strawberry Basket; 1943; oil with sand, fabric, wood, cardboard and nails on canvas; 10 by 12 inches (250 mm × 300 mm); acquired 1959; The Phillips Collection, Washington, D.C.

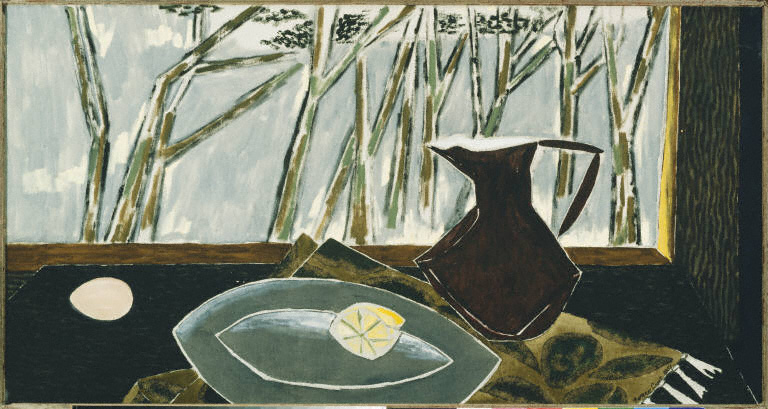
Bernice Cross, Winter Light, 1951, oil on canvas 18 by 34 inches (460 mm × 860 mm), acquired 1951, The Phillips Collection, Washington, D.C.

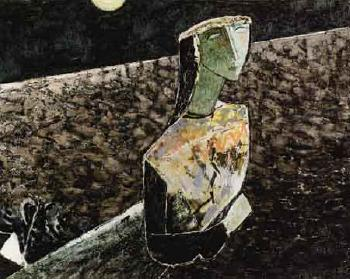
Bernice Cross, Figures in Moonlight, 1953, oil on canvas, 32 by 40 inches (810 mm × 1,020 mm), Blouin ArtInfo

Cross was an only child. She was born on August 22, 1912, to Frank Wallace Cross, a lifelong Iowa resident, and Constance Mabel Bunting, whose family came from England. Her full name is Bernice Francena Cross. In her late teens Cross enrolled at the Wilmington Academy in Wilmington, Delaware. Begun in 1927, the Wilmington Academy was run by N. C. Wyeth. A few years later she began study at the Corcoran School of Art and, in about 1933, became a student at the Phillips Gallery Art School in Washington, D.C. In 1933 C. Law Watkins established the Phillips School at Studio House, adjoining the gallery.

== Mature style ==
Although critics credited her with growing maturity over the next few decades, Cross rarely departed from an approach that was noted for its spontaneity, sense of fantasy, and good humor. Over the five decades of her professional career she experimented with a variety of techniques and the tone of her work was sometimes light and airy and other times dark and Gothic but, as the critic for the New York Sun pointed out, she was a painter whose work was always recognizably her own, that is one who, he wrote, "has her own signature".

During the 1930s, Cross made genre paintings of circus people, African-Americans, and characters out of fairy tales. She also painted still lifes, particularly flower arrangements. She drew attention to the two-dimensional area of her canvas through experiments with surface texture, and she established a balance between realism and abstraction that favored the latter. Her paintings were often childlike and made to please children. They gave a deceptive appearance of primitivism but were sophisticated in their composition, balance of forms, and use of color contrasts. She became known for the whimsy she displayed and a lighthearted, youthful spirit. Some of her early paintings show racial caricatures that went unremarked at the time, but today appear to be insensitive.

In 1933 Cross was awarded first prize for a still life painting in a student exhibition at the Corcoran Gallery and two years later she won first prize in the Greater Washington Independent Art Exhibition, shown in galleries of nine downtown department stores.

During the middle years of the 1930s Cross worked for the District of Columbia section of the Federal Art Project. On commission from that organization she painted a mural in the children's hospital of the District of Columbia sanitarium at Glenn Dale, Maryland. Covering the whole wall above the wainscoting on the left side of the entrance lobby, it showed figures out of the Mother Goose nursery rhymes. The mural generated controversy when the District of Columbia's public health officer, calling it grotesque and overly "modern", ordered it to be painted over. After protests by Cross and the Washington arts community, the District's health commissioner employed a panel of children to determine that the mural should remain.

During the latter part of the 1930s and throughout the next decade, Cross's work was shown in numerous group and solo exhibitions. Washington, D.C. was the most common location: the Phillips Gallery and its Studio House, the Little Gallery at the Intimate Bookshop, and the Whyte Gallery. She was also given a solo exhibition at the Contemporary Arts Gallery (1938) and the American British Art Center (1943), both in New York, and at the Boyer Galleries (1936) in Philadelphia. In 1949 she showed at the Corcoran, Phillips, and Barnett Aden Galleries in Washington, at the Chequire House gallery in Alexandria, Virginia, and in both solo and group exhibitions at the Bertha Schaefer Gallery in New York.

In 1936 a critic praised the subtlety of color in her paintings of this period, the skill she showed in organizing elements, and, in general, her sure touch. The writer appreciated the individual quality with which she invested the figures in her paintings and called attention to the "fantastic world of gay and colorful legend" that they invoked.

In 1938 Cross attended classes given by Karl Knaths at the Phillips Gallery School of Art. These were the first of a series of annual classes he would give during the winter session of the school over the next decade. A painting of 1940 called "Little Dove's Stove" shows the influence of Knaths in its restricted palette; use of carefully positioned, bold, outlined shapes; and absence of three-dimensional illusion. It is nonetheless an entirely original work, the more so since Cross departed from convention by creating it on velvet rather than canvas or board.

Although she did not continue to paint on velvet, Cross's work in the 1940s continued to show an adventurous experimentation with technique. This mainly manifested in an interest in surface texture. She would leave parts of a surface unpainted to show the bare canvas, use a brush and knife to build up layers of pigment, and add mica or ordinary sand to her paintings. At the end of the decade, a critic noted the appearance of dark works having a ghostly quality and a mannerist treatment of figures giving them an archaic simplicity. In 1949 this critic summarized the evolution of her painting over the prior 15 years: "In her first exhibited paintings, Bernice Cross developed a world of children and for children... She still inclines to fantasy, but the touch is sure, and each unit of composition is mobilized effectively to make art of an integrated whole. Which brings us to a seeming paradox; the imagination roams at will, but the painting is disciplined."

== Art instruction ==
In 1936 Cross and fellow artist Julia Eckel opened a studio where they taught art classes, and later that year Cross displayed works by some of the children she had taught in an exhibition at the Phillips Gallery. She continued teaching at this studio for some years and, in the late 1940s, began to teach classes at the Phillips Art School. During the 1950s she taught at the Washington Workshop Art Center, Washington, D.C., and early in the 1960s she taught at the YMCA of Washington, D.C.

Her obituary in The Washington Post says that Cross also taught at Hood College, Frederick, Maryland, and American University, Washington, D.C.

== Personal life ==
In 1937 Cross married a curator of the Phillips Gallery, James M. McLaughlin. An artist himself, he had known her since joining the gallery as an assistant in 1933, and from time to time in the 1940s they would participate in joint exhibitions of their work. After marrying the two lived in an apartment located on a street behind the gallery buildings. In 1950 they commissioned the architect Henry Klumb, a highly regarded student of Frank Lloyd Wright, to design a studio for their use in Arlington, Virginia. They had no children and divorced in the 1950s.

== Later life and work ==
In 1950 and for the remainder of her productive life, Cross continued to exhibit at the Whyte, Bader, and Barnett Aden galleries in Washington, D.C. In 1951, she had a solo show at the Bertha Schaefer Gallery in New York. In the late 1950s she participated in an innovative scheme called the Art Rental Gallery which allowed people to rent works with an option to buy. She also exhibited at the Washington Workshop Art Center (where she was teaching); at the Corcoran Gallery; and at the AC-BAW Gallery in Mount Vernon, New York, a community-based artists' cooperative founded in 1976 and still operating today.

Cross's style changed little from the 1940s through the end of her productive years. As one critic put it, she had a distinctive style that was "unaffected by abstract expressionism or any of the other 'isms' that have swept the country." Along with fanciful figures and still lifes, she increasingly produced portraits. The imaginary characters and vases of flowers were sharply drawn, colorful, and richly textured while the portraits tended to be dark, almost monochrome, and seen as ghostlike, inhabiting a cold grey, dreamlike environment. Her paintings enjoyed favorable reviews by critics in Washington and New York, but in 1956 one critic wrote that her colors were sometimes too thin and other times too bright, "destroying otherwise mysterious and evocative compositions". Those who appreciated her work praised her originality, creative imagination, sense of humor, and love of fantasy, and they drew attention to the surface effects she employed. One wrote that her naïveté contrasted sharply with her evident sophistication, "both esoteric and refined".

== Collections ==
Cross's works appear in the Phillips Collection, the Smithsonian American Art Museum, other prominent museums, and many private collections.

== Exhibitions ==
This selected list comes from news accounts and a list provided by the Phillips Collection. Note that the museum now known as the Phillips Collection has had four names: the Phillips Memorial Art Gallery (1920–23), the Phillips Memorial Gallery (1923–48), the Phillips Gallery (1948–61), and its current name (1961–present).

- 1933 Still Life Award, student exhibition, Corcoran Gallery
- 1935 First prize, Group Exhibition, Greater Washington Independent Art Exhibition in galleries of nine downtown department stores
- 1935 Group exhibition, Phillips Memorial Gallery, Washington, DC
- 1936 Group exhibition, Boyer Galleries, Philadelphia
- 1936 Group exhibition, Phillips Memorial Gallery, Washington, DC
- 1936 Group exhibition, Studio House, Washington, DC
- 1936 Solo exhibition, Little Gallery at the Intimate Bookshop, Washington, DC
- 1937 Group exhibition, Phillips Memorial Gallery, Washington, DC
- 1937 Group exhibition, Washington Room, Phillips Memorial Gallery at Studio House, Washington, DC
- 1938 Duo exhibition, Phillips Memorial Gallery, Washington, DC
- 1938 Group exhibition, Studio House and Little Gallery in Georgetown
- 1938 Solo show Contemporary Arts, New York
- 1939 Group exhibition, Whyte Gallery, Washington, DC
- 1939 Group exhibition, Contemporary Arts, New York
- 1939 Group exhibition, Little Gallery in Georgetown
- 1940 Group exhibition, Phillips Memorial Gallery at Studio House, Washington, DC
- 1941 Group exhibition, Allocations Gallery, Washington, DC
- 1941 Group exhibition, Little Gallery, Washington, DC
- 1942 Group exhibition, American University, Washington, DC
- 1942 Solo exhibition, Intimate Gallery, Washington, DC
- 1943 Group exhibition, American British Art Center, New York
- 1944 Solo exhibition, Phillips Memorial Gallery, Washington, DC
- 1946 Group exhibition, Phillips Memorial Gallery, Washington, DC
- 1946 Solo exhibition, Whyte Gallery, Washington, DC
- 1948 Group exhibition, Whyte Gallery, Washington, DC
- 1948 Solo exhibition, Phillips Gallery, Washington, DC
- 1949 Duo exhibition, with James McLaughlin, Barnett-Aden Gallery, Washington, DC
- 1949 Group exhibition, Biennial, Corcoran Gallery, Washington, DC
- 1949 Group exhibition, Bertha Schaefer Gallery, New York
- 1949 Solo Exhibition Bertha Schaefer Gallery, New York
- 1949 Solo exhibition, Phillips Gallery, Washington, DC
- 1949 Solo exhibition, Bertha Schaefer Gallery, New York (first one-person show in NY since 1938)
- 1949 Group exhibition, Chequire House gallery, Alexandria, Virginia
- 1950 Group exhibition, Barnett Aden Gallery, Washington, DC
- 1950 Solo exhibition, Whyte Gallery, Washington, DC
- 1951 Bernice Cross Retrospective, Phillips Gallery, Washington, DC
- 1951 Group exhibition, Whyte Gallery, Washington, DC
- 1951 Solo Exhibition Bertha Schaefer Gallery, New York
- 1953 Group exhibition, Barnett Aden Gallery, Washington, DC
- 1953 Group exhibition, the Washington Workshop, Washington, DC
- 1953 Two-person exhibition, Phillips Gallery, Washington, DC
- 1954 Group exhibition, Bader Gallery, Washington, DC
- 1956 Solo exhibition, Franz Bader Gallery, Washington, DC
- 1957 Group exhibition, Playhouse Theater lounge, Washington, DC
- 1957 Group exhibition, Art Rental Gallery, Washington, DC
- 1958 Group exhibition, Art Rental Gallery, Washington, DC
- 1959 Group exhibition, Franz Bader Gallery, Washington, DC
- 1959 Group exhibition, Art Rental Gallery, Washington, DC
- 1960 Group exhibition, Corcoran Gallery, Washington, DC
- 1962 Group exhibition, Barnett Aden Gallery, Washington, DC
- 1966 Group exhibition, Franz Bader Gallery, Washington, DC
- 1970 Solo exhibition, Franz Bader Gallery, Washington, DC
- 1988 Group Exhibition, AC-BAW Gallery Mount Vernon, NY
- 1988 Group exhibition, Bader Gallery, Washington, DC
