= Barnett-Aden Gallery =

- Established: October 16, 1943
- Dissolved: c. May 29, 1969
- Location: 127 Randolph Pl. NW, Washington, D.C., U.S.
- Type: Art gallery
- Founders: James V. Herring, Alonzo J. Aden

The Barnett-Aden Gallery was an art gallery in Washington D.C., founded by James V. Herring and Alonzo J. Aden, who were associated with Howard University's art department and gallery. The Barnett-Aden Gallery is recognized as the first successful Black-owned private art gallery in the United States, (Note: The cited source explains this particular phrasing at footnote 4, on the basis that the Harlem Renaissance sculptor Augusta Savage opened a New York City gallery, The Salon of Contemporary Negro Art, earlier, in June 1939, but it closed after only a few months.) showcasing numerous collectible artists and becoming an important, racially integrated part of the artistic and social worlds of 1940s and 1950s Washington, D.C.

== History ==
The Barnett-Aden Gallery opened on October 16, 1943, on the first floor of 127 Randolph Place, NW, a Victorian townhouse shared by Aden and Herring, who were business and life partners. Herring joined the Howard faculty in 1921, started the university's art department in 1922, chaired the department until his retirement in 1953, and founded the university's gallery of art in 1928 (it opened in 1930). Aden, an art history student of Herring's at Howard, was the first curator of the Howard University Art Gallery and the first director of the Barnett-Aden Gallery. The gallery is named after his mother, Naomi Barnett Aden, who was a "benefactor." From the outset, Alma Thomas, a former student of Herring's at Howard, served as the gallery's vice president and provided funding, as well as Laura Carson and Dr. and Mrs. Cecil Marquez.

Instead of collecting commissions from artists, Aden and Barnett invited gifts of art from the exhibiting artists; these gifts would become part of the Barnett-Aden Collection.

=== Artists represented ===
The Barnett-Aden Gallery presented and promoted artists of all backgrounds, particularly African American artists who had limited exhibition opportunities in the 1940s, 1950s, and 1960s. Collectible artists featured at the gallery included Alma Thomas, Elizabeth Catlett, Lois Mailou Jones, Charles White, Edward Mitchell Bannister, Jacob Lawrence, Laura Wheeler Waring, Romare Bearden, Henry O. Tanner, Bernice Cross, Merton Simpson, Morris Louis, Kenneth Noland, Jacob Lawrence, and several others.

=== Gallery visitors ===
Exhibitions, shows, receptions and other events at the Barnett-Aden Gallery provided a racially integrated gathering place for the art community in a segregated city from the 1940s-1960s.

First Lady Eleanor Roosevelt was photographed visiting the Barnett-Aden Gallery in 1944, as she attended the opening of the Candido Portinari show, along with foreign ambassadors, presidential cabinet members, and local dignitaries. Romare Bearden said that the first time he saw a Matisse in Washington was at the Barnett-Aden. Therese Schwartz wrote that the Barnett-Aden was the most important art gallery in America south of New York.

== Closure and legacy ==
After the sudden death of gallery co-founder Aden in 1961, the gallery began to decline. Herring, Aden's partner, died in 1969, and the gallery closed.

The Barnett-Aden Collection was divided and distributed into three lots: Adolphus Ealey, a former student of Herring's, and a former director of the Barnett-Aden Gallery, received more than 200 paintings; Felton J. Earls, MD, received Herring's books, drawings, and prints; and art collector Cecil Marquez and his wife, who were initial supporters of the gallery, received sculptures from the collection.

In the 1970s, the Barnett-Aden collection was displayed at the Anacostia Neighborhood Museum of the Smithsonian Institution, the Corcoran Gallery of Art, and the Museum of Afro-American Culture and History in Philadelphia.

In 1989, Ealey sold his portion of the collection to the Florida Endowment Fund for Higher Education. In 1998, Robert L. Johnson, founder of BET, purchased the collection.

In 2012, the Virginia Museum of Fine Arts presented, "Rediscovered Artworks from the Barnett Aden Collection," an exhibition that featured 50 paintings, sculptures, and works on paper from the Collection that were acquired by Margaret and John Gottwald. The VMFA exhibit features the work of 23 artists, including Richmond Barthé, Elizabeth Catlett, David Driskell, Norman Lewis, Charles White, and Hale Woodruff.

In 2015, Johnson donated portions of the collection to the National Museum of African American History and Culture.

In 2017, portions of the Barnett-Aden Collection that were acquired by Margaret and John Gottwald composed the “A Special Kind of Soul” exhibit at the Black History Museum and Cultural Center of Virginia.

== Exhibitions ==
During its existence, the Barnett-Aden Galley hosted nearly 200 exhibitions and presented the work of more than 400 artists.

Year	Title	Artists	Reference
1943	“American Paintings for the Home”	Louis Bosa, Ann Brockman, Hilda Wilkinson Brown, William Carter, Elizabeth Catlett, Nicolai Cikovski, Aaron Douglas, Malvin Gray Johnson, Lois Mailou Jones, Jacob Lawrence, Elliott Orr, James A. Porter, Betty Graves Reyneau, Charles Sebree, Celine Tabary, Henry Ossawa Tanner, C. Law Watkins, James Lesesne Wells, Charles White, Hale Woodruff	
1943	“Pets and Personages”	Georgina Klitgaard, Chet La More	
1944	“The Negro in Art”	Alice Acheson, Richmond Barthé, William Carter, Elizabeth Catlett, Tony Cornetti, Eldzier Cortor, Allan Rohan Crite, Aaron Douglas, Frederick C. Flemister, Margaret Goss, Lois Mailou Jones, Edward Loper, Frank Neal, James A. Porter, David Ross, James L. Wells, Charles White, Hale Woodruff, Andrea de Zerega.	
1944	“Tibetan Banners and Small Bronzes.”		
1944	“Bamboo Paintings by Dr. Wang Chi-Yuan”	Wang Chi-Yuan	
1944	“American Paintings for American Homes.”		
1944	“Creative paintings by children and junior members of Lois Jones’ Saturday morning class.”		
1944	“American Paintings for the Home.”	Aaron Douglas, Lois Mailou Jones, James A. Porter, Betsy Graves Reyneau, Celine Tabary, James L. Wells, Hale Woodruff.	
1944	“Candido Portinari.” First anniversary exhibition.	Candido Portinari	
1945	Group show	William H. Johnson, Lois Mailou Jones, James S. Porter, John N. Robinson, Celine Tabary, Prentiss Taylor, Hale Woodruff.	
1945	14 serigraph portraits	Harry Sternberg	
1945	“Jack Perlmutter” -- 2nd Anniversary exhibition	Jack Perlmutter	
1946	Group show to honor Cecil Patrick Wilson	Jack Berman, richard Dempsey, Aaron Douglas, Robert Jackson, Lois M. Jones, Herman Maril, Jack Perlmutter, John Robinson, Celine Tabary, Laura Wheeler Waring, Ellis Wilson.	
1946	“Samuel J. Brown”	Samuel J. Brown	
1946	“Paintings by Lois Mailou Jones”	Lois Mailou Jones	
1946	“The Life of John Brown” -- 3rd Anniversary exhibition	Jacob Lawrence	
1946	“Paintings by Ellis Wilson”	Ellis Wilson	
1946	Group show with 20 artists	Alice Acheson, Tony Cornetti, Nicolai Cikovski, Eldzier Cortor, John Farrar, Robert Jackson, Petion Savain, Anthony Sisti, Henry Ossawa Tanner, Ellis Wilson, and 10 more.	
1947	“January and February”	Frank H. Alston Jr., Paul T. Arlt, Jack I. Berkman, Samuel J. Brown, David Burliuk, Calvin Burnett, Calvin Burnett, Elizabeth Catlett, Nicolai Cikovsky, Minna Citron, Eldzier Cortor, Ralston Crawford, Charles Davis, Thelma W. DeAtley, Edguard Freeman, John Gerard, Malvin Gray Johnson, William H. Johnson, Jacob Lawrence, Herman Maril, I. Rice Pereira, Jack Perlmutter, James A. Porter, John N. Robinson, Laura Wheeler Waring, Ellis Wilson, Hale Woodruff.	
1947	“Abstract Paintings”		
1947	Watercolor exhibition	Alice Acheson, Phillip Bell, Douglas Brown, Nicolai Cikovsky, Adolf Dehn, George Grosz, Lois Mailou Jones, Eliot O’Hara, Rudolph Von Ripper, Prentice Taylor.	
1947	“Paintings by Berkman, Calfee, Kainen, Lazzari, Perlmutter, Robinson”	Jack Berkman, William Calfee, Jacob Kainen, Pietro Lazzari, Jack Perlmutter, John N. Robinson.	
1947	“Twelve Paintings by Twelve Artists”	Benjamin Abramowitz, Oded Bourla, Glenn O. Coleman, Charles Davis, Lawrence Lebduska, Peppino Mangravite, Archibald Motley, James A Porter, Laura Wheeler Waring.	
1947	John Farrar	John Farrar	
1947	“Recent Paintings by Charles White” -- 4th Anniversary exhibition.	Charles White	
1947	“Paintings, Sculpture, and Prints of The Negro Woman”	Elizabeth Catlett	
1948	“Paintings and Drawings by James A. Porter”	James A. Porter	
1948	Benjamin Abramowitz	Benjamin Abramowitz	
1948	“Contemporary American Paintings”		
1948	“Contemporary American Paintings”	Jack Berkman, Eldzier Cortor, Aaron Douglas, James Farrar, Frederick Flemister, Lois Mailou Jones, I. Rice Pereira, James A. Porter, John N. Robinson, Anthony Siste, Henry O. Tanner, Laura Wheeler Waring, Charles White, Ellis Wilson, Hale Woodruff.	
1948	“Exhibition of Paintings and Watercolors”	Frank H. Alston Jr.	
1948	“Contemporary Religious Paintings” -- 5th Anniversary exhibition	Romare Bearden, Jean Charlot, Gen-Paul (Eugene Paul), Max Jacob, Hilde B. Kayn, Hildreth Meiere, Kenneth Hayes Miller, Fred Nagler, B. J. O. Nordfeldt, Horace Pippin, Boardman Robinson, Augustus Vincent Tack, Henry O. Tanner, Louis di Valentin, James L. Wells, Robert Winthrop White.	
1948	“Pereira”	Irene Rice Pereira	
1949	“Juanita Marbrook”	Juanita Marbrook	
1949	Barnett Aden Gallery acquisitions over the last six years	Theodoro Ramos-Blanco, Henry O. Tanner.	
1949	“Contemporary American Art” -- 6th Anniversary exhibition	Romare Bearden, Louis Bouche, David Burliuk, Bernice Cross, Kenneth Evett, Robert Gwathmey, John Edward Heliker, Whitney Hoyt, S. Lev Landau, I. Rice Pereira, Jack Perlmutter, James Penney, Iver Rose, Moses Sawyer, Vernon Smith, Stamos, Tromka, Jakov Volovich, James L. Wells, Ellis Wilson	
1949	“Sylvia Carewe”	Sylvia Carewe	
1950	Six Washington Artists	Romare Bearden, Samuel Bookatz, Bernice Cross, Robert Gates, Norma Mazo, James A. Porter	
1950	“Paintings and Prints by James Lesesne Wells”	James Lesesne Wells	
1950	Works from the permanent collection and works loaned by Herbert Benevy	Romare Bearden, Samuel Bookatz, James Broady, William Calfee, James Farrar, Jack Perlmutter, Merton Simpson.	
1950	“Contemporary American Art: For the Home” -- 7th Anniversary Exhibition.	Gifford Beal, Louis Bouche, Edward Bruce, David Burliuk, Eldzier Cortor, Russell Cowles, Kenneth Evett, John Heliker, Robert Gwathmey, Whitney Hoyt, John Koch, Joseph Lasker, James Penny, Sidney Raynes, Andree Ruellan, Iver Rose, Hugh Lee Smith, Vernon Smith, Henry O. Tanner, Esther Williams.	
1951	“Three Washington Artists”	Richard Dempsey, Sam Herman, Jack Perlmutter	
1951	“Lila Oliver Asher: Paintings, Graphic Arts, Sculpture”	Lila Oliver Asher	
1951	Merton Simpson -- 8th Anniversary Exhibition	Merton Simpson	
1951	“Herman Maril: Paintings in Retrospect, 1931-1951”	Herman Maril	
1951	“Recent Haitian American Paintings by Richard Dempsey”	Richard Dempsey	
1952	“Therese M. Schwartz”	Therese M. Schwartz	
1952	“Contemporary American Paintings from the Permanent Collection”	Robert Gwathmey, Peppino Mangravite, I. Rice Pereira, Merton Simpson, Theodoros Stamos.	
1952	“Privately Owned: Paintings Purchased by Patrons, 1943-1952” -- 9th Anniversary Exhibition	Frank H. Alston Jr., Elizabeth Catlett, Nicolai Cikovsky, Bernice Cross, Richard Dempsey, Robin Jackson, Lois M. Jones, Herman Maril, I Rice Pereira, Jack Perlmutter, James A. Porter, Candido Portinari, John N. Robinson, Theresa Schwartz, Merton Simpson, Theo Stamos, James L. Wells, Ellis Wilson	
1953	Favorites from the Collection	Samuel Bookatz, Cameny, Daylis, Richard Dempsey, Robert Gwathmey, Joseph Lasker, Margaret Stark, Henry O. Tanner.	
1953	“Contemporary American Paintings		
1953	“Eighteen Washington Artists” -- 10th Anniversary Exhibition.	Benjamin Abramowitz, Frank H. Alston Jr., Sarah Baker, Samuel Bookatz, William Calfee, Bernice Cross, Richard Dempsey, Robert Gates, John Gernand, Lois M. Jones, Jacob Kainen, James McLaughlin, Jack Perlmutter, Marjorie Phillips, James a. Porter, Theresa Schwartz, Charles Seebree, James L. Wells	
1954	“Six Washington Painters”	Theresa Abbott, Gabriel Cherin, Gloria Besser Green, Babette Kasmir, Alma W. Thomas, Anita Wertheim	
1954	“Abstractions: New York and Washington Artists”	Leon Berkowitz, James A. Broady Jr., Gene Davis, Richard Dempsey, Peggy Goldstein, Albert Henriques, Harlan Jackson, Robert Jackson, Jacob Kainen, Pietro Lazzari, Morris Louis, Kenneth Noland, I. Rice Pereira, Jack Perlmutter, James A. Porter, Therese Schwartz, Merton D. Simpson, Stamos, Margaret Stark, Joe Summerford.	
1954	“Paintings by New York Artists” -- 11th Anniversary exhibition.	David Burliuk, Slvia Carewe, Minna Citron, Russell Cowles, Kenneth Evett, Walter Feldman, Robert Gwathmey, John Heliker, Joe Lasker, I. Rice Pereira, Andree Ruellen, Karl Schrag, Therese Schwartz, Merton Simpson, Vernon Smith, Theodoros Stamos, Charles White, Ellis Wilson, Yuen Yuey Chin, Maguerite Zorach.	
1955	“Ruth Galoon”	Ruth Galoon	
1955	“Contemporary American Painting: New York and Washington Artists”		
1955	“Jack Perlmutter” -- 12th Anniversary exhibition	Jack Perlmutter	
1956	“Contemporary Artists Group”	Mimi Dubois Bolton, Gene Davis, Richard Dempsey, Ruth Galoon, Robert Gates, Carmelo Gonzales, Albert Henriques, Pietro Lazzari, Morris Louis, Leonard Maurer, Kenneth Noland, I. Rice Pereira, Easton Pribble, Peter L. Robinson Jr., Therese M. Schwartz, Merton D. Simpson, Theodoros Stamos, Joe Summerford, Alma W. Thomas, William Walton.	
1956	“Merton D. Simpson”	Merton D. Simpson	
1956	New Group Show for the Summer	Aaron Bohrod, Selma Burke, William Calfee, Mina Citron, Gene Davis, Maxim Elias, Clare Fontanini, Ruth Galoon, Robert Gates, Peggy Goldstein, Ernesto Gonzales, Harlan Jackson, Antonio Salemme, Therese Schwartz, Merton Simpson, Charles Sebree, Theodoros Stamos, Bill Turner.	
1956	“Contemporary American Artist Group: New York and Washington” -- 13th Anniversary exhibition	Romare Bearden, Yuen Yuey Chinn, Gene Davis, Richard Dempsey, David Driskell, Ruth Galoon, Robert Gates, S. Felrath Hines, Joe Lasker, John Laurent, John Chapman Lewis, Pietro Lazzari, Mary Orwen, I. Rice Pereira, Charles Sebree, Bella Schwartz, Therese M. Schwartz, Merton D. Simpson, Theodoros Stamos, Alma W. Thomas.	
1957	“David C. Driskell: Exhibition of Paintings”	David C. Driskell	
1957	“Countess Grabowski”	Countess Grabowski	
1957	“Contemporary American Art” -- 14th Anniversary exhibition	Bernard Arnett, Mimi DuBois Bolton, Laura Douglas, Ruth Galoon, S. Felrath Hines, Joseph Kalfel, John Laurent, Carl Morris, James Penney, I. Rice Pereira, Merton D. Simpson, Hughie Lee Smith, Theodoros Stamos, Earl Stroh, Joe Summerford, Alma Thomas, Laura Wheeler Waring.	
1958	Group Show A- 1958		
1958	“Suzuki”	Suzuki	
1958	Group Show B - 1958		
1958	“Norman Lewis: Paintings”	Norman Lewis	
1959	“Calligraphy and Drawings by Wang Chi-Yuan”	Wang Chi-Yuan	
1959	“Exhibition of Contemporary Art of Hollin Hills and Washington”	Frank Buffmire, Dorothy Fall, Louis Gross, Jacqueline Hammer, Sonia Hodson, Hilda Shapiro, Frank Spagnola, Alma Thomas, Lorraine Weaver, Dorothy Weintraub.	
1959	“Exhibition of Paintings by Pietro Lazzari, Helen Rennie, Alma Thomas, Andrea Zerega” -- 16th Anniversary exhibition	Pietro Lazzari, Helen Rennie, Alma Thomas, Andrea Zerega	
1959	“Exhibition of Religious Paintings and Prints by James L. Wells and Sculpture by Selma Burke”	James Lesesne Wells, Selma Burke	
1960	New work by Washington painters	George Bayless, Mimi Bolton, Robert Gates, Jack Lewis, Helene McKinsey, Hilda Shapiro, Helen Rennie, Joe Summerford, Alma Thomas.	
1960	“American Contemporary Art, 1930 to 1960”	Richmond Barthé, Selma Burke, Elizabeth Catlett, Harold Cousins, Guy Du Bois, Philip Evergood, Clare Fontanini, Robert Gwathmey, Hans Hoffman, Hughie Lee-Smith, I Rice Periera, Merton Simpson, Theodoros Stamos, Charles White.	
1960	“Exhibition of Paintings by Miriam Mitchell”	Miriam Mitchell	
1961	“Contemporary American Paintings”		
1961	“Andrea Zerega and Former Students”	Andrea Zerega	
1961	“Exhibition of Paintings by Jane Love”	Jane Love	
1961	“Paintings by Albert Sangiamo”	Albert Sangiamo	
