= James V. Herring =

African-American artist

James Vernon Herring (January 7, 1887 – May 29, 1969) was an African-American artist and professor of art at Howard University.

== Biography ==
Herring founded Howard University's Department of Art in 1922. In 1943, along with Alonzo J. Aden, he opened the Barnett-Aden Gallery in Washington, D.C. The gallery was the first Black owned and operated private art gallery in the United States and it was located at 127 Randolph Street, NW. In an effort to fight segregation, both black and white artists were exhibited at the gallery. The gallery served as a place to meet for those interested in art, including curators from the Phillips Collection, Corcoran Gallery of Art, and the National Gallery of Art.

Herring and Aden also worked together on the Gallery of Art at Howard University. Herring founded it in 1930 and Aden served as the first curator.

Herring retired from Howard in 1953.
