= Woodridge (Washington, D.C.) =

- Neighborhood of Washington, D.C.
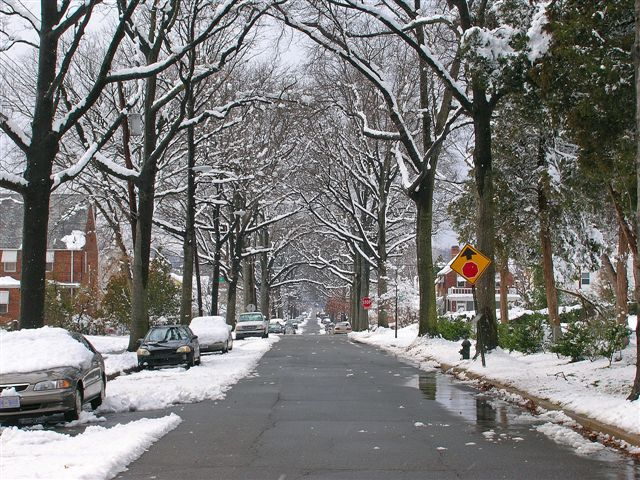
- Woodridge is a primarily residential neighborhood.

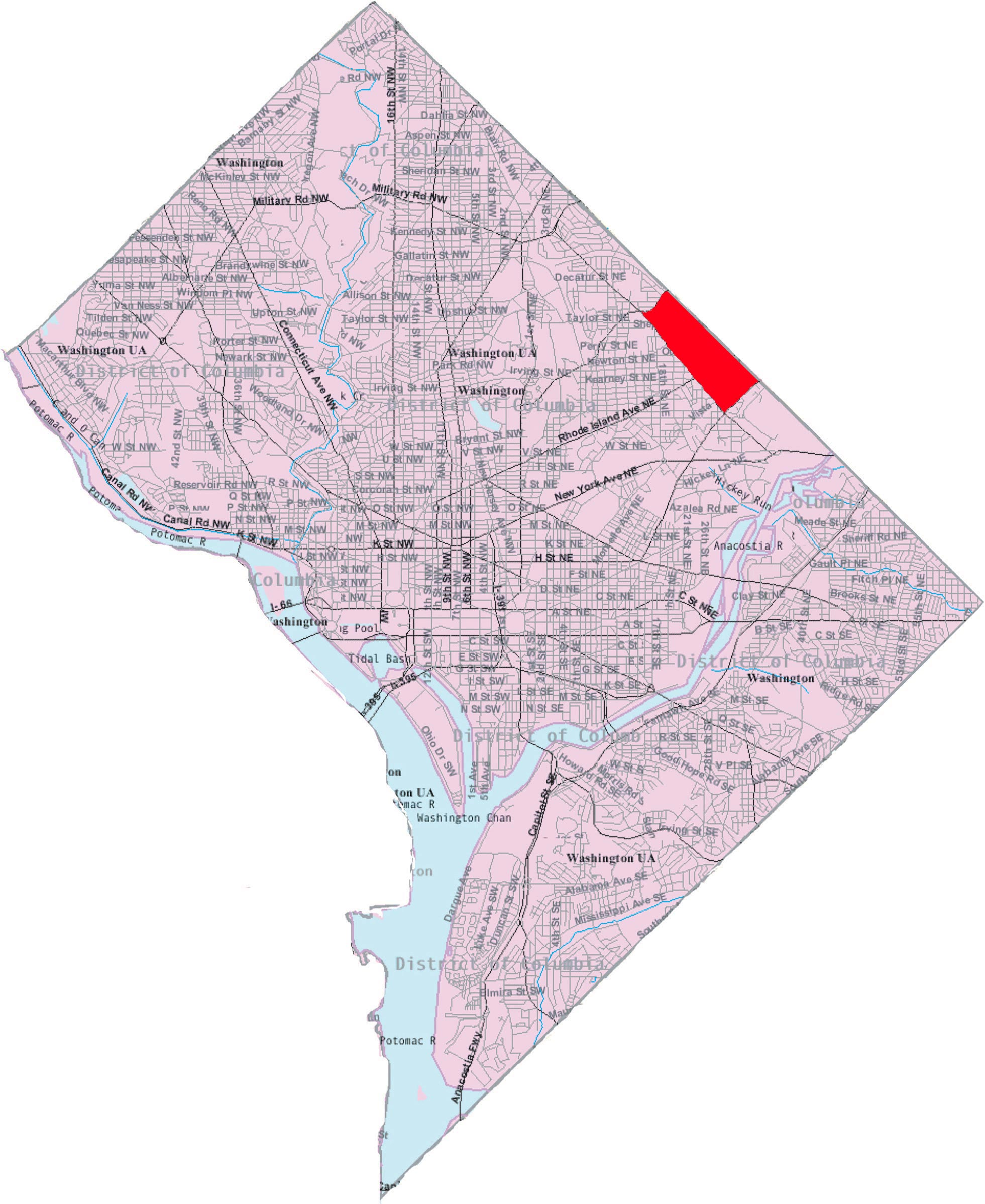
- Woodridge within the District of Columbia
- Coordinates: 38.9315°N 76.9711°W
- Country: United States
- District: Washington, D.C.
- Ward: Ward 5

Government
  - Councilmember: Zachary Parker
- Postal code: ZIP code

Woodridge is a residential neighborhood located in Ward 5 of Northeast Washington, D.C. Woodridge is contained between Eastern Avenue N.E. to the east, Taylor Street N.E. to the north, South Dakota Avenue N.E. to the west, and Bladensburg Road N.E. to the south. Its central commercial strips are Rhode Island Avenue NE (Route 1) and Bladensburg Road N.E. Woodridge borders the adjacent neighborhoods of Brookland, Langdon, North Michigan Park, and Fort Lincoln in Northeast Washington D.C. In addition to these neighborhoods in the District of Columbia, Woodridge borders the city of Mount Rainier and town of Cottage City in Maryland. In terms of public transportation, residents of Woodridge have access to the Brookland-CUA and Rhode Island Avenue Metro stations.

== Education ==
District of Columbia Public Schools operates public schools.

District of Columbia Public Library operates the Woodridge Neighborhood Library located at 18th and Rhode Island Ave. N.E.

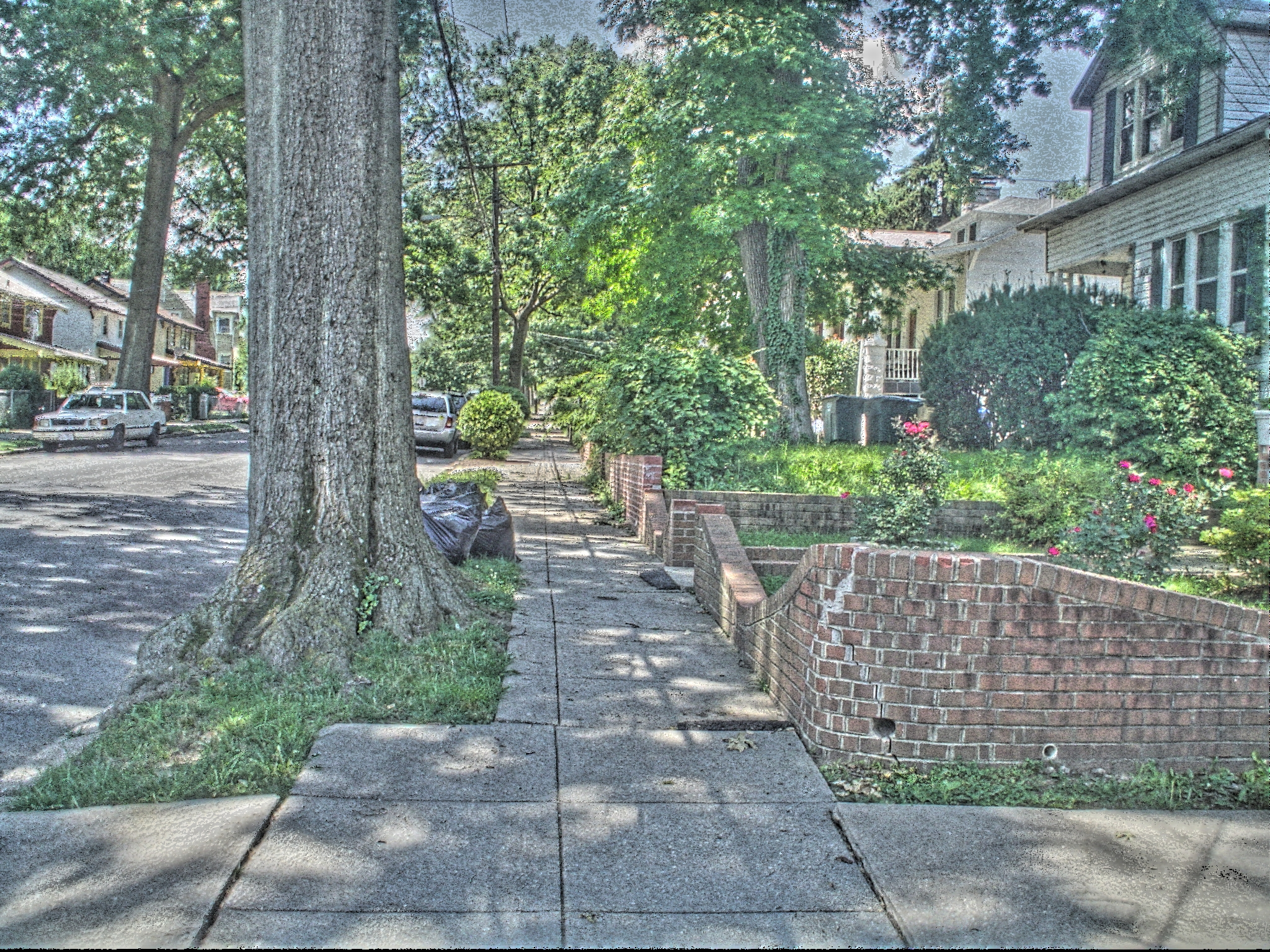
Myrtle Avenue
