= Bing Thom =

Canadian architect (1940–2016)

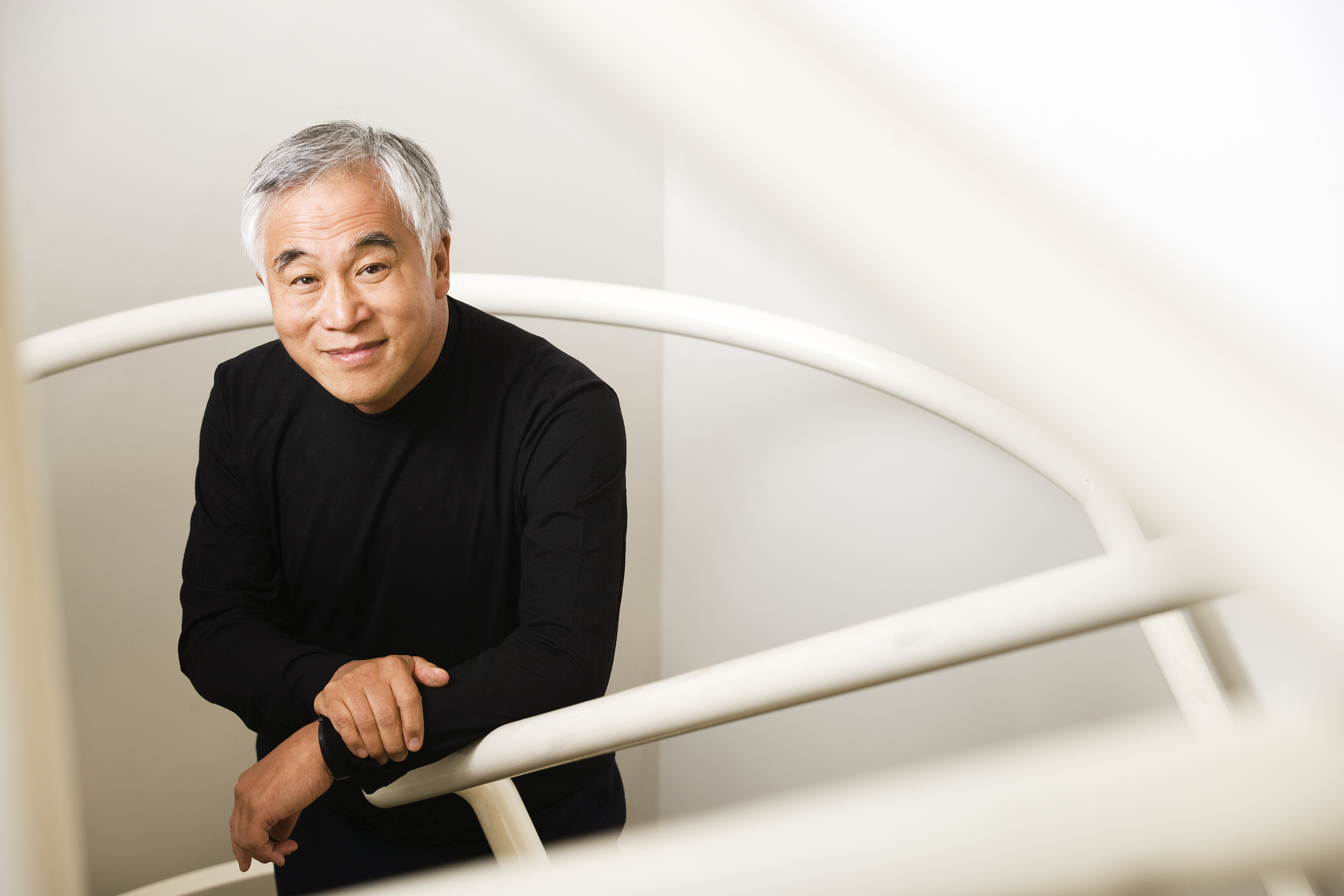
- Born: 8 December 1940; Hong Kong
- Died: 4 October 2016 (aged 75); Hong Kong
- Education: University of British Columbia; University of California, Berkeley
- Occupation: Architect
- Awards: Order of Canada

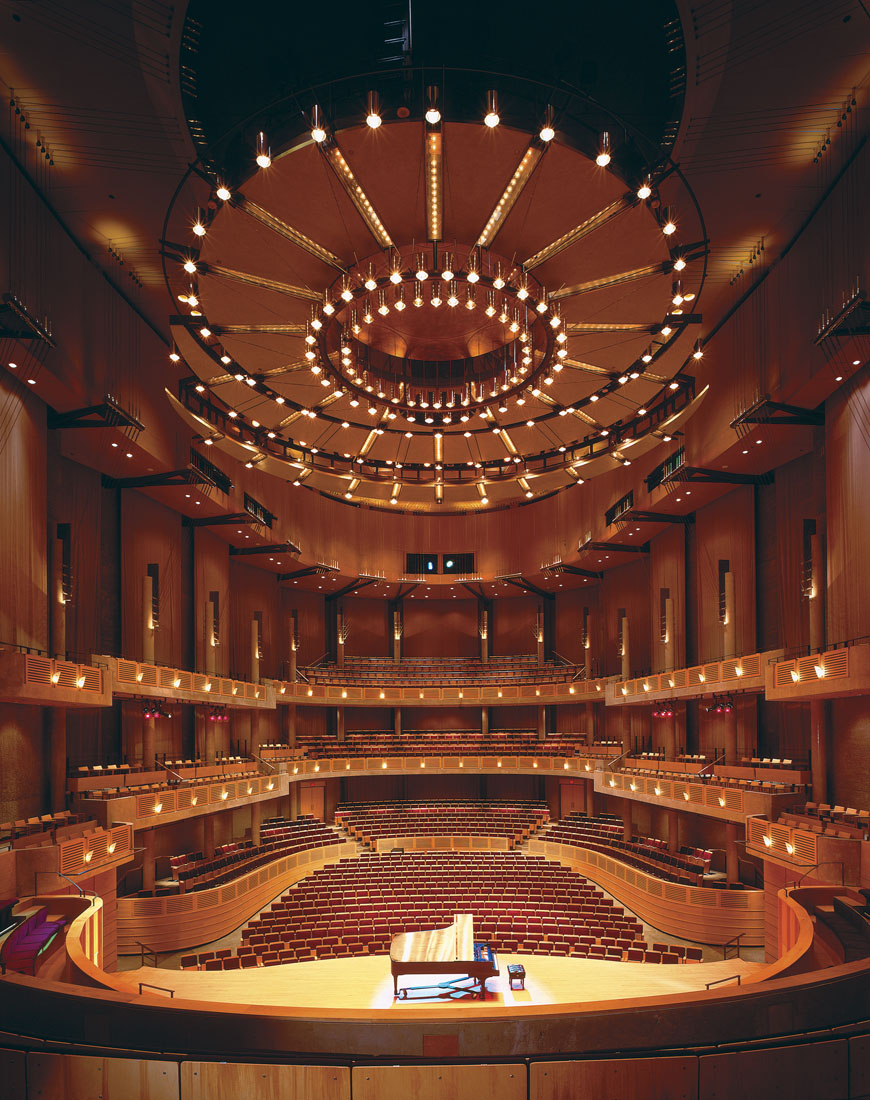
Chan Centre for the Performing Arts Concert Hall

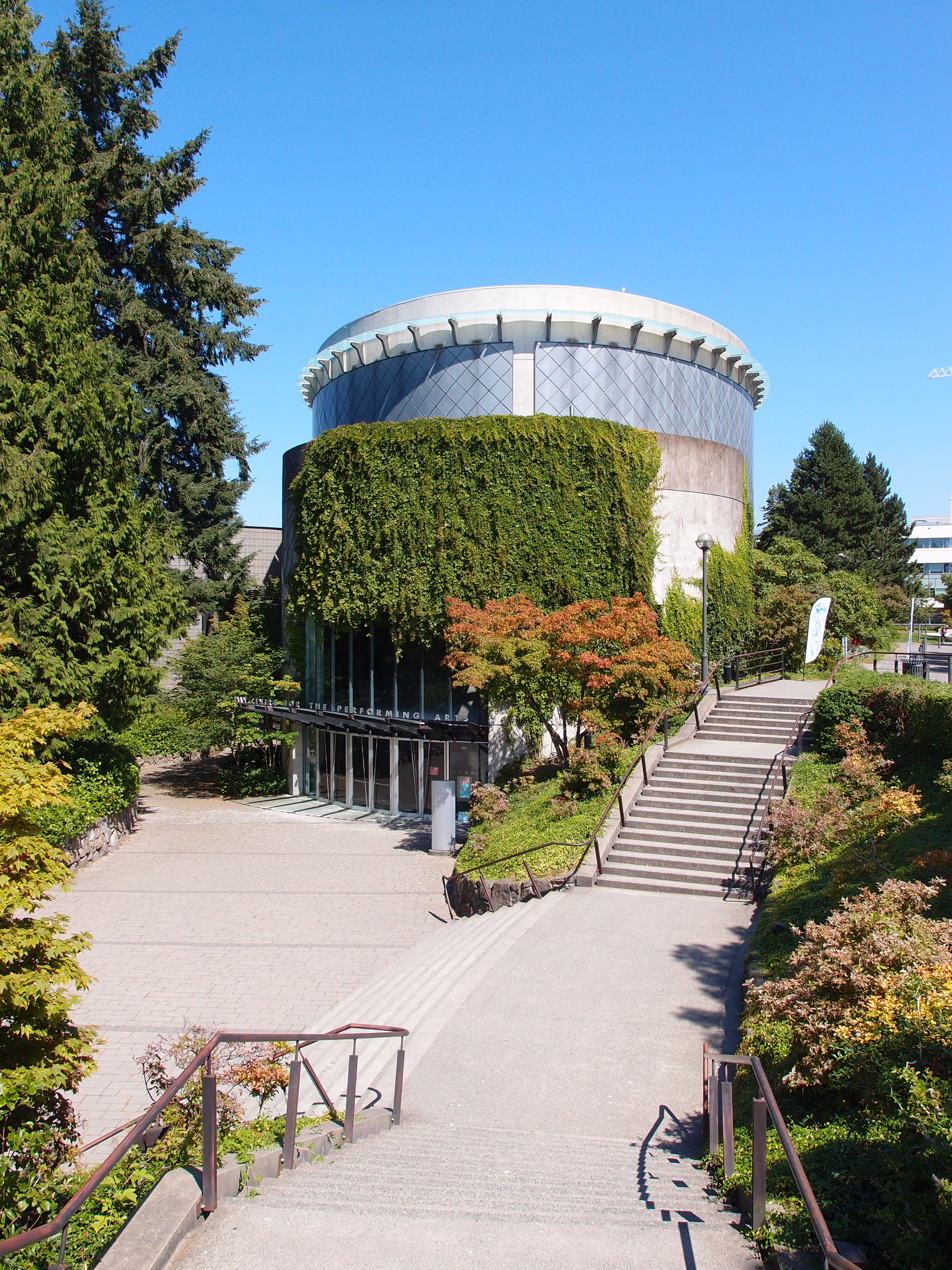
Chan Centre for the Performing Arts

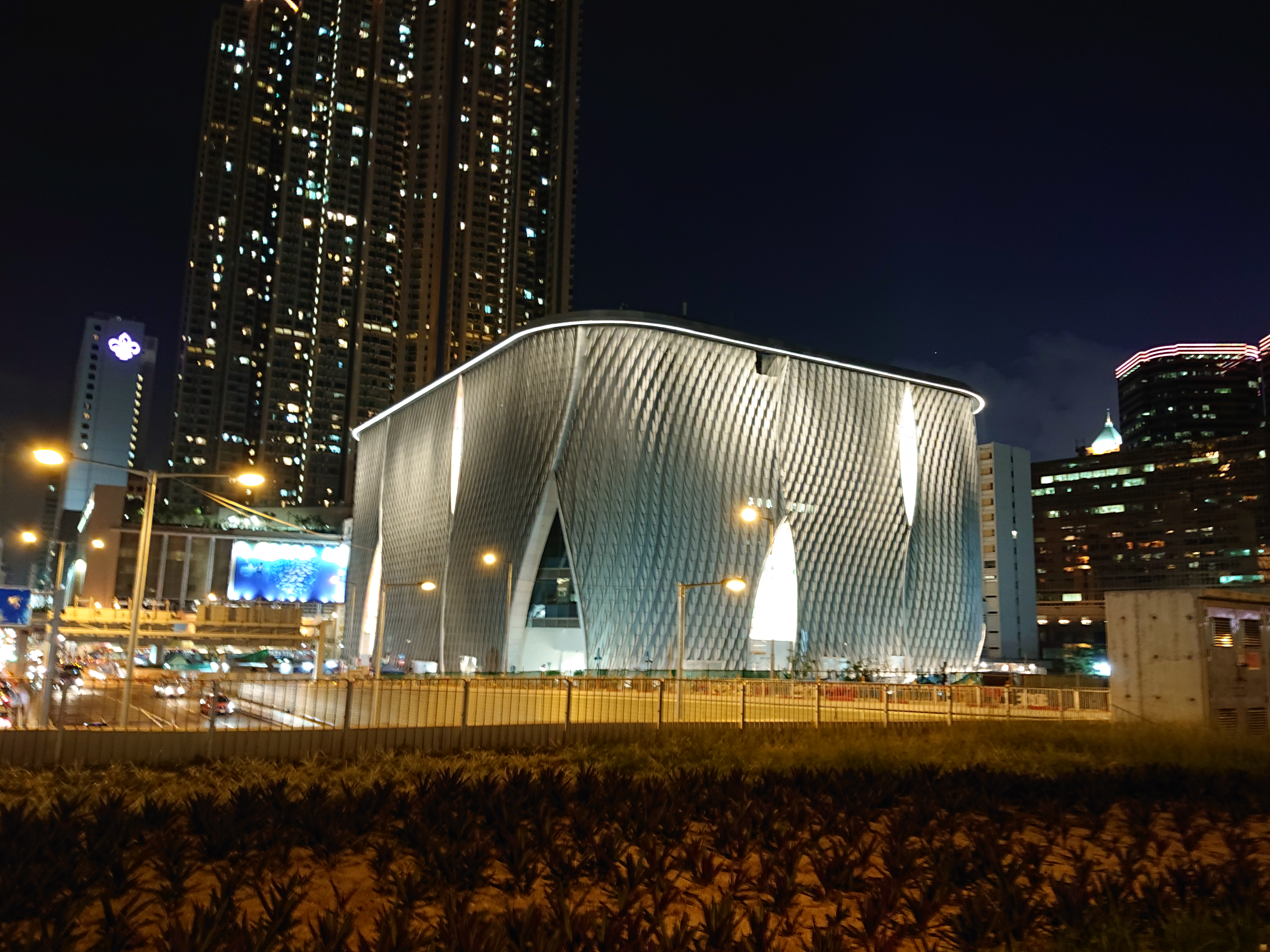
Xiqu Centre

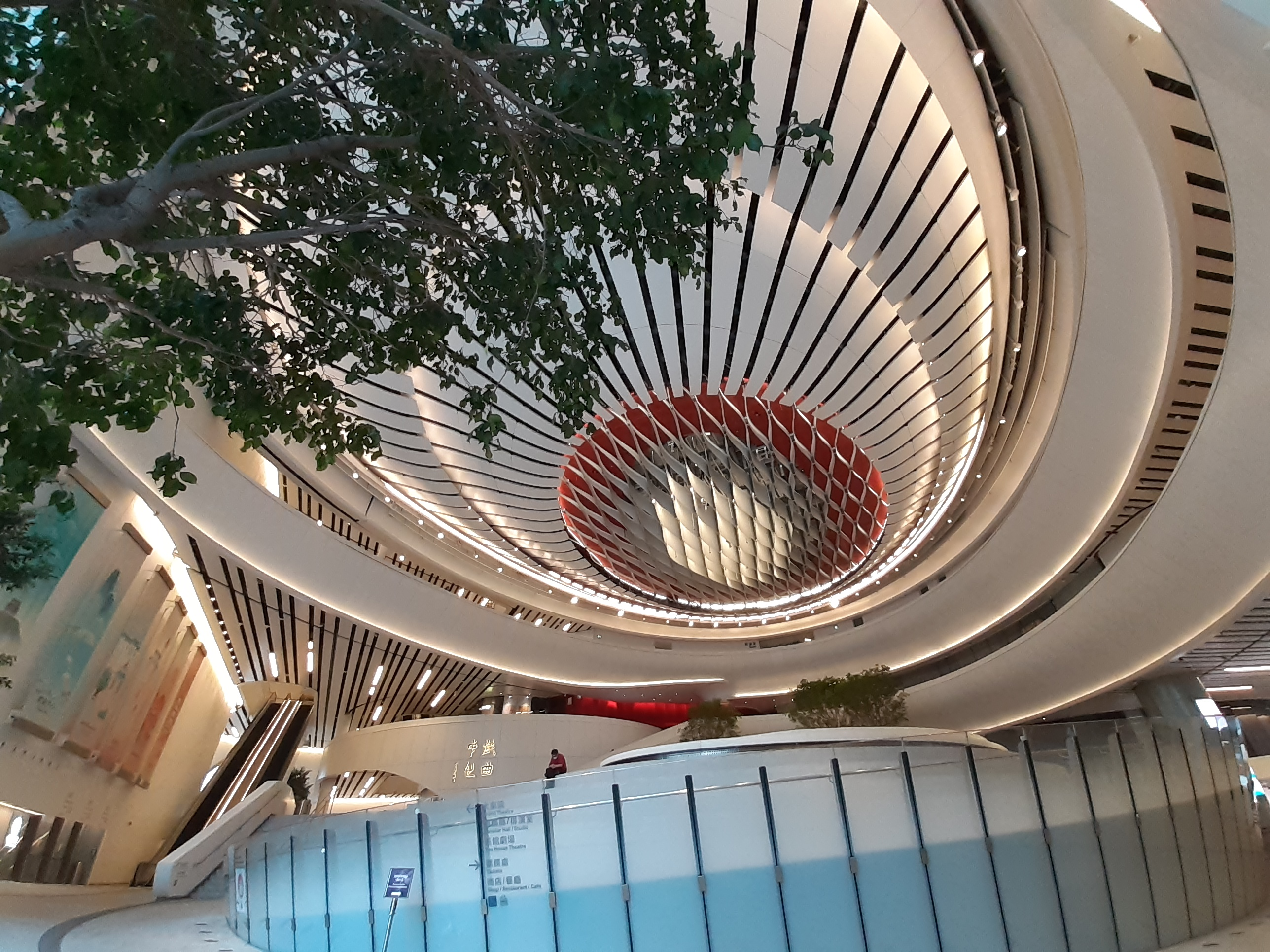
Xiqu Centre Interior

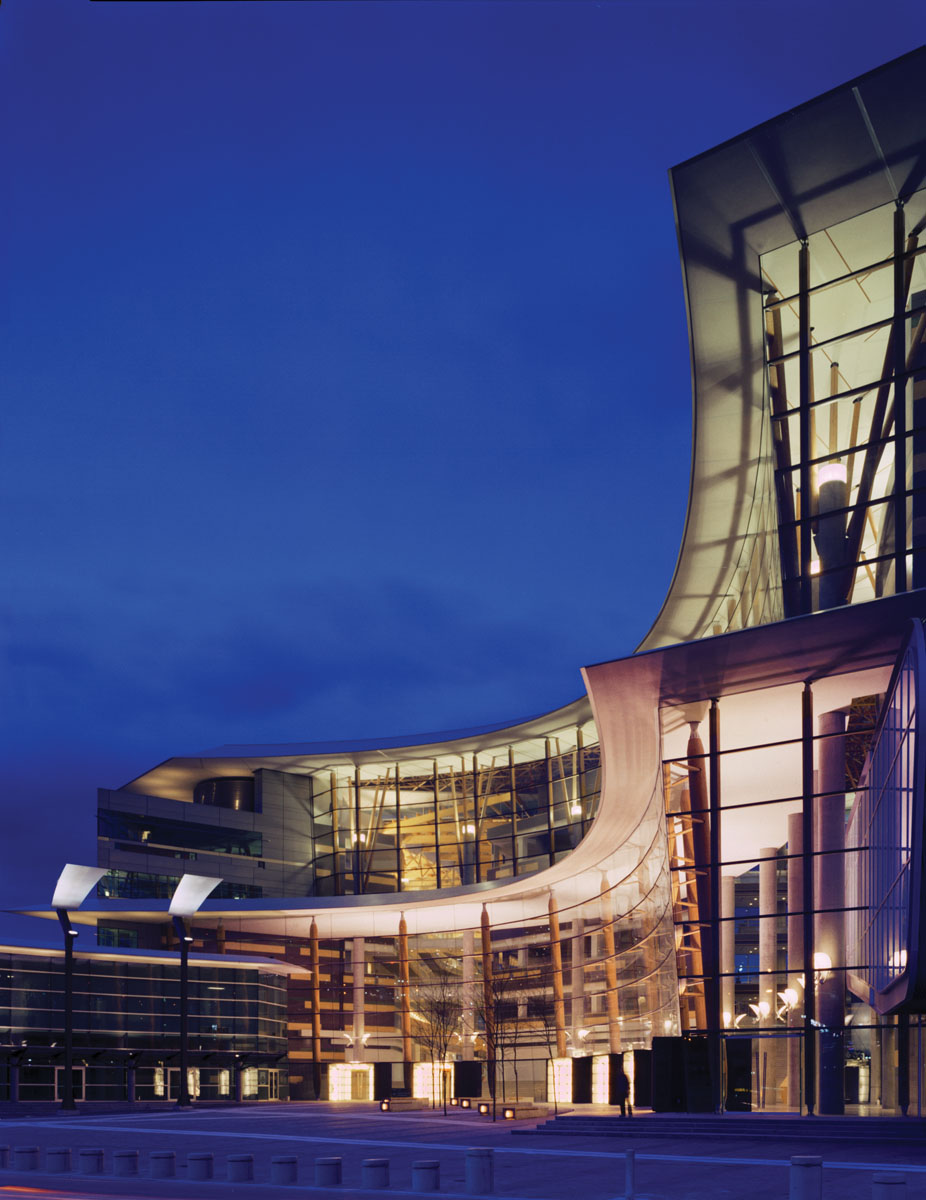
Central City Plaza & Forecourt

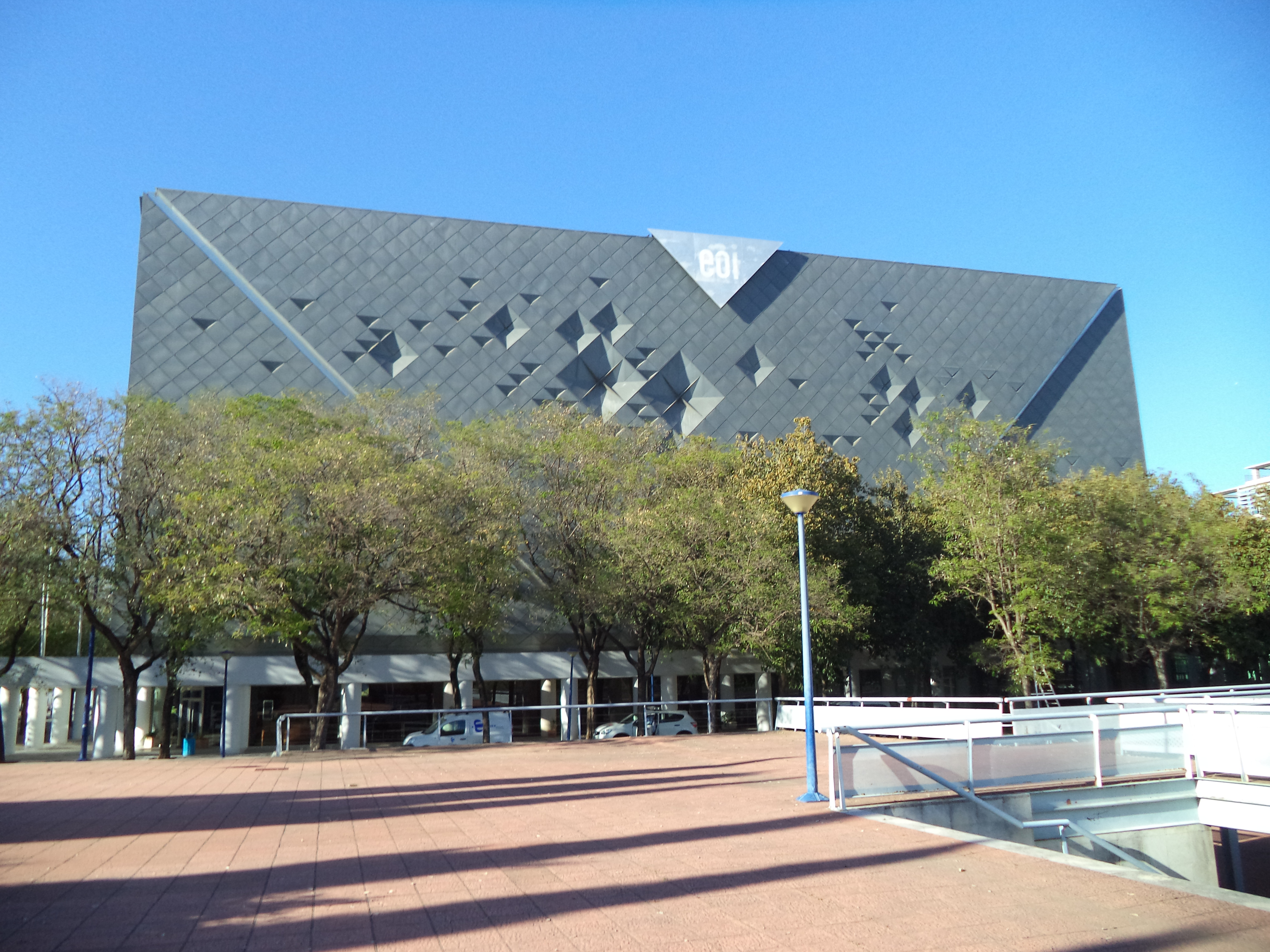
The Canada Pavilion, Expo '92

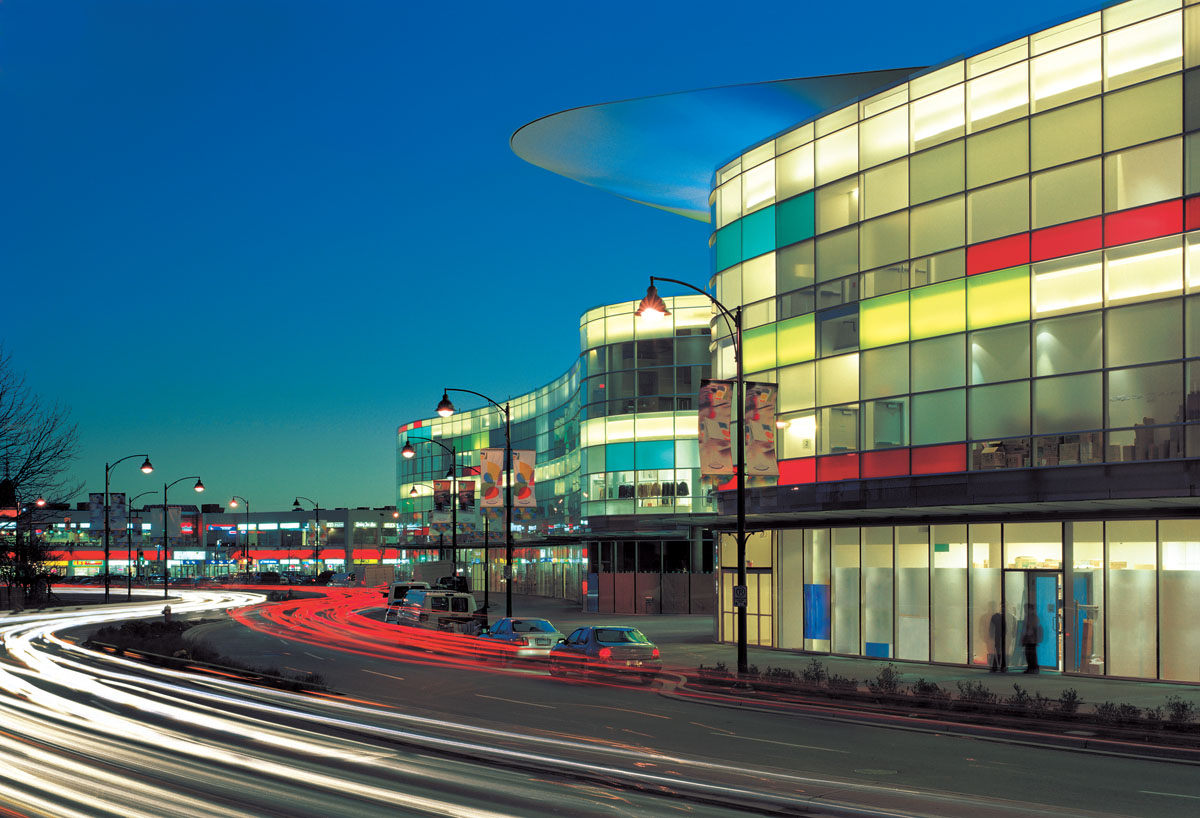
Aberdeen Centre

Arena Stage, Mead Center for American Theater

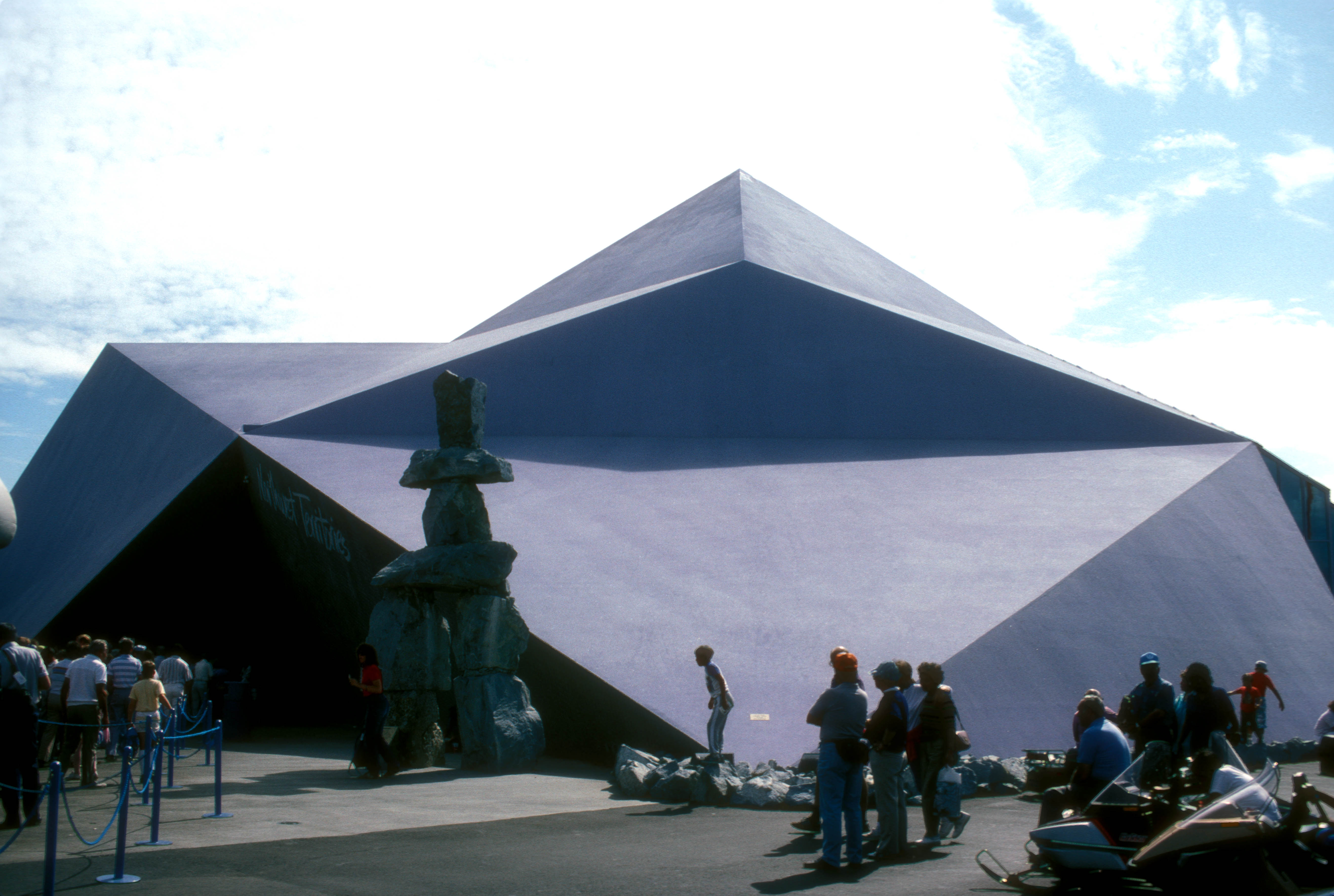
The Northwest Territories Pavilion, Expo '86

Bing Wing Thom CM FRAIC (8 December 1940 – 4 October 2016) was a Canadian architect and urban designer.

== Early life ==
Bing Wing Thom (Chinese: 譚秉榮) was born of December 8, 1940 in Hong Kong and emigrated to Vancouver with his family in 1949. His paternal grandfather had emigrated to Vancouver in the 1890s and his father was born in New Westminster before moving to Hong Kong after being unable to practice as a pharmacist in Canada.

In 1966, Thom received a Bachelor of Architecture from the University of British Columbia (UBC) then a Master of Architecture from the University of California, Berkeley. He spent two years teaching at the National University of Singapore, then returned to Vancouver and taught at UBC for another two years. In 1971, he moved to Tokyo to work for Japanese architect Fumihiko Maki.

== Career ==
In 1973, his former teacher Arthur Erickson Architects asked him to act as project director on the Robson Square Courthouse Complex. Thom had a life-long interest in landscaping and embraced the challenge of the project, which involved putting a full landscape over a man-made structure and creating a 4-block roof garden; the project, which involved thousands of plants, was complex—he and landscape architect Cornelia Oberlander went so far as to create their own soil.

After Robson Square, Thom worked with Erickson on Toronto's Roy Thomson Hall, the Air Defence Ministry Building in Jeddah and California Plaza in Los Angeles. He would also repeatedly work with Oberlander, notably on the Chan Centre for the Performing Arts at UBC. The site contained 50 100-foot trees and 200 60 year-old azaleas. Thom put the 8-storey structure into this forest, and then let the forest grow onto it. In a 1990 interview, Thom said that he was an architect first, but would never design a building without also designing the landscape, saying "The building must grow from the ground, and the landscaping is the foundation. Each building must sit correctly on that setting, while relating to the landscape. So the landscape is actually more important than the building. Many architects don't realize that landscaping is essential to architecture—that buildings and gardens are inter-related and indivisible. I start every design by looking at the property's characteristics—the way the sun shines, the wind blows, the location, the view. I use plants only, never anything artificial. And I always use vegetation from the building's locale. We must remember that we can't fight nature. We have to work with it."

In 1981, Thom established his own firm, Vancouver-based Bing Thom Architects in an office of his own design and construction. As of 2015, the firm had 47 staff members, including principals Michael Heeney, Venelin Kokalov and Shinobu Homma, directors, registered architects, architectural graduate and students, urban designers and planners, and support staff. Thom also had offices in Hong Kong and Washington D.C. and, in 2010, was awarded the Architectural Firm of the Year award by the Royal Architectural Institute of Canada (RAIC). At Thom's death, the firm's name was changed to Revery Architecture, which completed some of Thom's projects, notable the Butterfly Tower & First Baptist Church Complex which opened in 2026.

Thom's firm spent its first few years working on numerous private homes, condominium towers, and pavilions for Vancouver's Expo 86, including the top-rated Northwest Territories Pavilion, a $2.8 million iceberg, with a coating of shimmering glass granules. This led to the commission to design the Canada Pavilion at Expo '92 in Seville. For this, Thom needed to express the Canadian spirit in a way that would fit with Spanish architecture. Canada is the world's largest exporter of zinc, so Thom used thick zinc-tiled walls to control heat and included a cool, landscaped courtyard and a cascading water wall. Visitors waited in line for as long as eight hours to get into the pavilion, but they did so in a shaded colonnade. The structure also included a performance stage, exhibit hall, restaurant, art gallery and a 500-seat IMAX Theatre. It was one of the most popular pavilions at the fair, garnered major global recognition and became the only international pavilion permanently retained as a legacy building.

In 1995, Thom was made a Member of the Order of Canada and received the Queen Elizabeth II Golden Jubilee Medal for outstanding service to his country. He was a Fellow of the Royal Architectural Institute of Canada and received honorary degrees from UBC and Simon Fraser University—he was also named Honorary Professor by Singapore's Tongji University. In 2011 he was awarded the RAIC's highest honour, the RAIC Gold Medal.

== Personal life and death ==
Thom was married to Bonnie Koo, a landscaper, for over 50 years; they had no children. While on a trip to Hong Kong, Thom suffered a brain aneurysm and died on October 4, 2016 at the age of 75.

== Works ==
The full records of Thom's projects, drawings and proposals can be found at the University of Calgary Archives.

Structure	Location	Type	Year
The Butterfly Tower & First Baptist Church Complex	Vancouver, BC	Residential development	2026
Simon Fraser University Sustainable Energy and Environmental Engineering Building	Surrey, BC	Educational building	2019
Xiqu Centre	Tsim Sha Tsui, Hong Kong	Performing arts structure, Chinese Opera	2018
Allard Hall, MacEwan University	Edmonton, AB	University arts centre	2017
Woodridge Neighborhood Library	Washington, DC	Library	2016
Guildford Aquatic Centre	Surrey, BC	Community centre	2015
Aberdeen Square retail and office addition to Aberdeen Centre	Richmond, BC	Mixed-use development	2013
Tarrant County College, Trinity River Campus	Fort Worth, TX	Educational institution	2011
Surrey City Centre Public Library	Surrey, BC	Library	2011
Arena Stage at the Mead Center for American Theater	Washington, DC	Performing arts structure	2010
SAIT Polytechnic Parking Garage	Calgary, AB	Parking structure	2009
Sunset Community Centre	Vancouver, BC	Community centre	2008
Trafalgar Square Installation: "Vancouverism" Cedar Sculpture	London, UK	Public square	2008
Aberdeen Centre addition and condominium development	Richmond, BC	Residential structure	2008
SAIT Polytechnic Master Plan	Calgary, AB	Educational institute	2007
Trinity Uptown planning and urban design study	Fort Worth, TX	Mixed-use development	2006
Central City Shopping Centre, Simon Fraser University campus and office integration	Surrey, BC	Educational institution and retail development	2004
Acadia Residence	Vancouver, BC	Residence	2004
Aberdeen Centre	Richmond, BC	Retail, entertainment development	2004
City of Dalian Master Plan	Dalian, China	City plan	1995
City of Yuxi Master Plan	Yuxi, China	City plan	1999
Chan Centre for the Performing Arts	Vancouver, BC	Performing arts structure	1997
The Bing Thom Building	Vancouver, BC	Condominium Tower	1994
Canada Pavilion at Expo '92	Seville, Spain	General structure	1992
Homer Tower	Vancouver, BC	Condominium Tower	1992
False Creek Yacht Club	Vancouver, BC	General structure	1989
The Pointe	Vancouver, BC	Residential development	1995
Sun Sui Wah Restaurant	Vancouver, BC	Restaurant	1995
Pacific Canada Pavilion, Vancouver Aquarium	Vancouver, BC	General structure	1998
Mayfair Lakes Golf Course Clubhouse	Richmond, BC	General structure	1993
Shon Residence	Vancouver, BC	Residence	1988
Northwest Territories Pavilion, Expo 86	Vancouver, BC	General structure	1986
Hong Kong Pavilion, Expo '86	Vancouver, BC	General structure	1986
Bing Thom Architects Offices	Vancouver, BC	Office	1982

== Awards and honors ==
- Lieutenant Governor of British Columbia Award in Architecture: The Butterfly, 2025
- International Architecture Award, Skyscrapers/High Rises: The Butterfly, 2025
- Future House Award: The Butterfly, 2025
- Canadian Architect Award of Excellence: The Butterfly, 2021
- Lieutenant-Governor of British Columbia Medal for Excellence in Architecture: Guildford Aquatic Centre, 2016
- Lieutenant-Governor of British Columbia Certificate of Merit for Excellence in Architecture: Surrey City Centre Public Library, 2013
- Margolese National Design for Living Prize, School of Architecture and Landscape Architecture at the University of British Columbia, 2013
- Top 25 Canadian Immigrant Award Winner, Canadian Immigrant Magazine, 2012
- Royal Architectural Institute of Canada Gold Medal, 2011
- Lieutenant-Governor of British Columbia Certificate of Merit: SAIT Polytechnic Parkade, 2011
- Architectural Firm Award, Royal Architectural Institute of Canada, 2010
- LL.D. honoris causa, University of British Columbia, 2008
- Lieutenant-Governor of British Columbia Certificate of Merit for Excellence in Architecture: Aberdeen Centre, 2007
- Excellence on the Waterfront Award, The Waterfront Center: The Trinity Uptown Plan, 2005
- Merit Award, Landscape Analysis & Planning, Boston Society of Landscape Architects: The Trinity Uptown Plan, 2005
- LL.D. honoris causa, Simon Fraser University, 2004
- Special Jury Prize, Marché International des Professionnels de l'Immobilier: Surrey Central City, 2004
- Lieutenant-Governor of British Columbia Medal in Architecture: Surrey Central City, 2004
- Innovation Award, Architectural Institute of British Columbia: Surrey Central City, 2004
- Queen Elizabeth II Golden Jubilee Medal, 2002
- CIP Award for Planning Excellence, Canadian Institute of Planners: Conceptual Development Plan for the City Center of Yuxi, 2001
- Lieutenant-Governor of British Columbia Medal: Pacific Canada Pavilion, Vancouver Aquarium, 2000
- Innovation Award, Architectural Institute of British Columbia: Pacific Canada Pavilion, Vancouver Aquarium, 2000'
- Lieutenant-Governor of British Columbia Medal: Chan Centre for the Performing Arts, 1998
- USITT Merit Award, United States Institute for Theater Technology: Chan Centre for the Performing Arts, 1998
- Member of the Order of Canada, 1995
- Winner, Canadian National Selection (Canada Pavilion, Seville Expo '92, 1992
- Lieutenant-Governor of British Columbia Medal: False Creek Yacht Club, 1992
- Governor General Medal, Royal Architectural Institute of Canada: Point Grey Road Condominiums, 1990
- Governor General Medal, Royal Architectural Institute of Canada: False Creek Yacht Club, 1990
- Excellence on the Waterfront Award, The Waterfront Center: False Creek Yacht Club, 1990

== Gallery ==
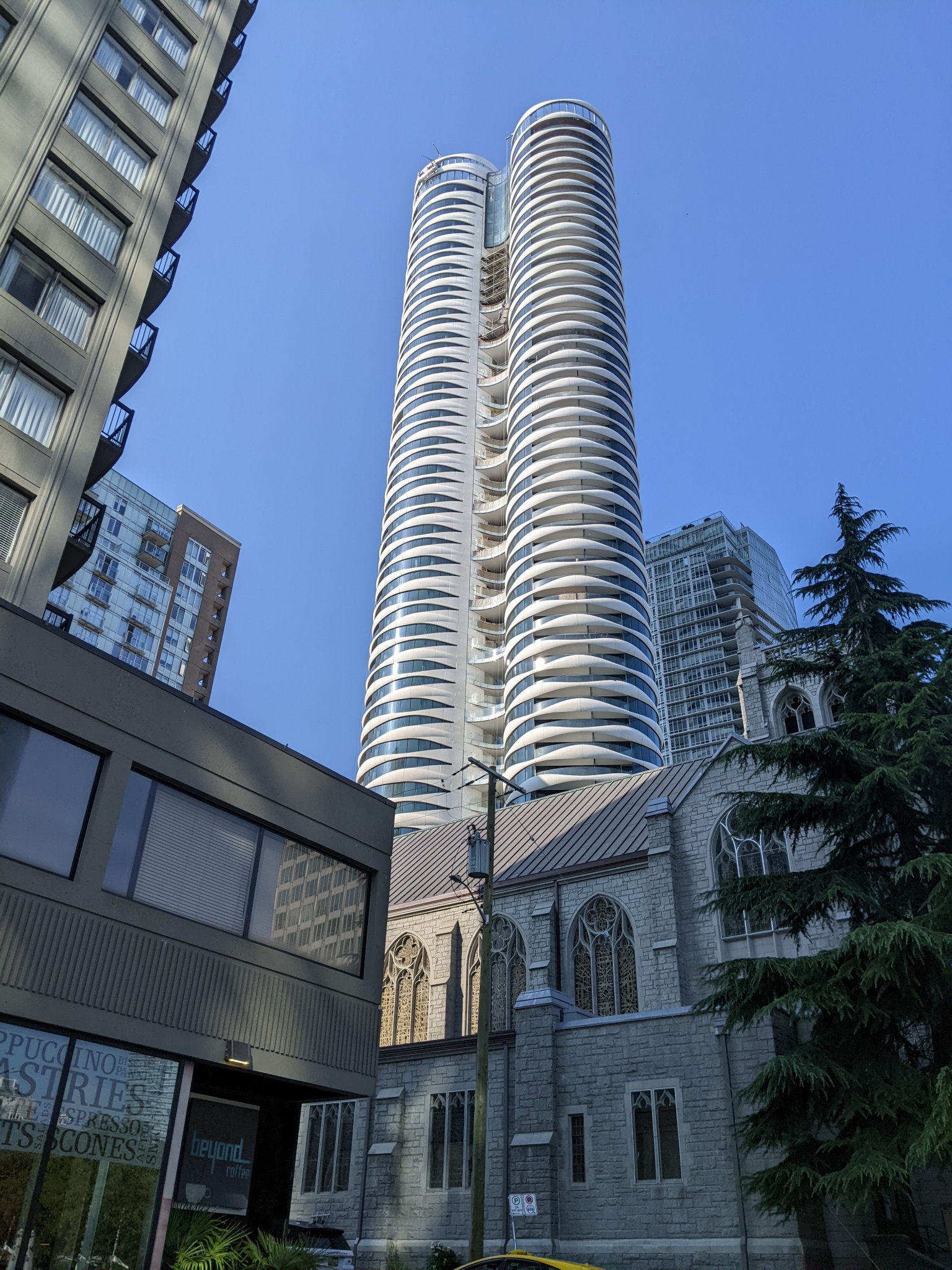
The Butterfly

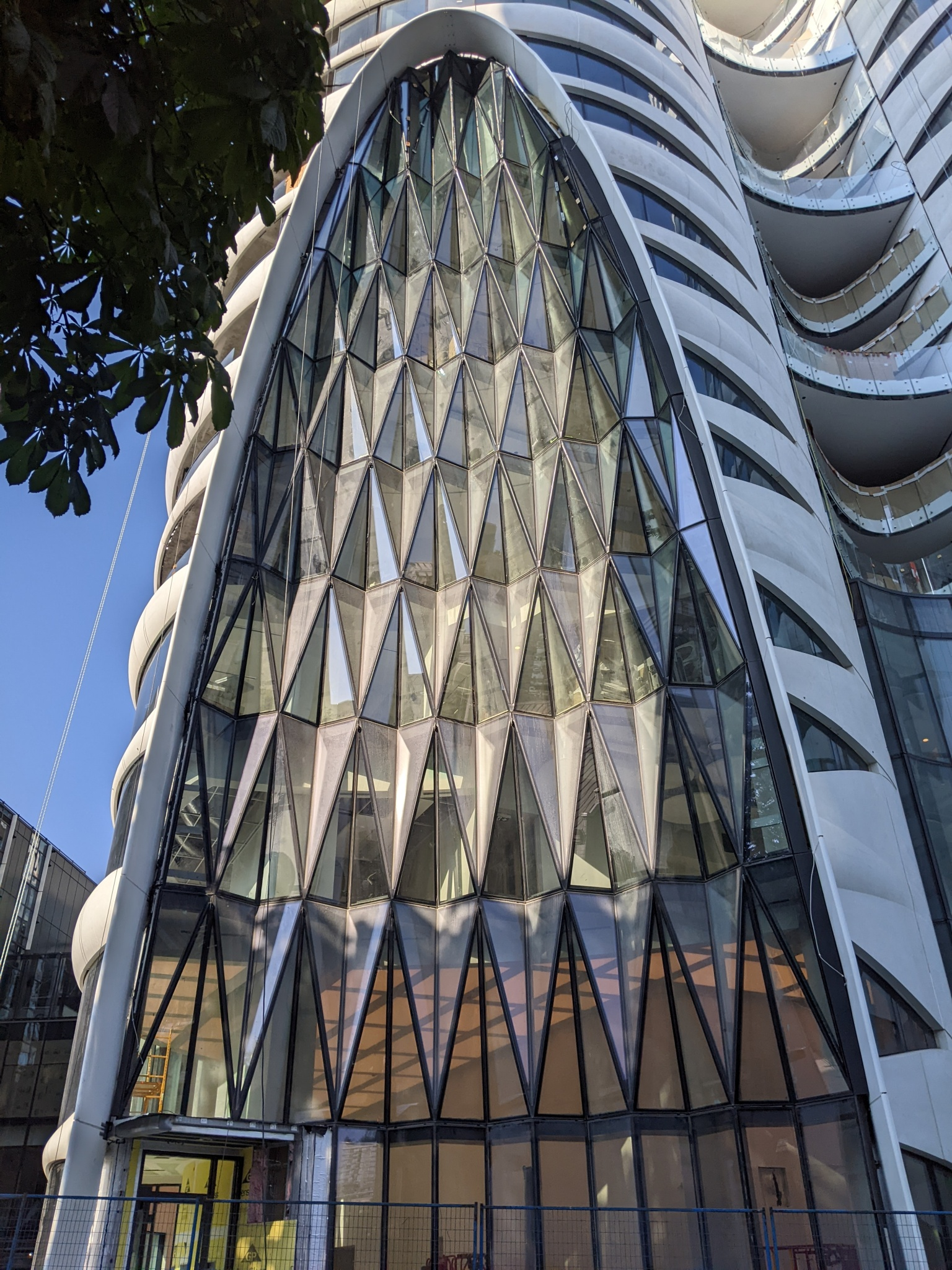
The Butterfly Entrance

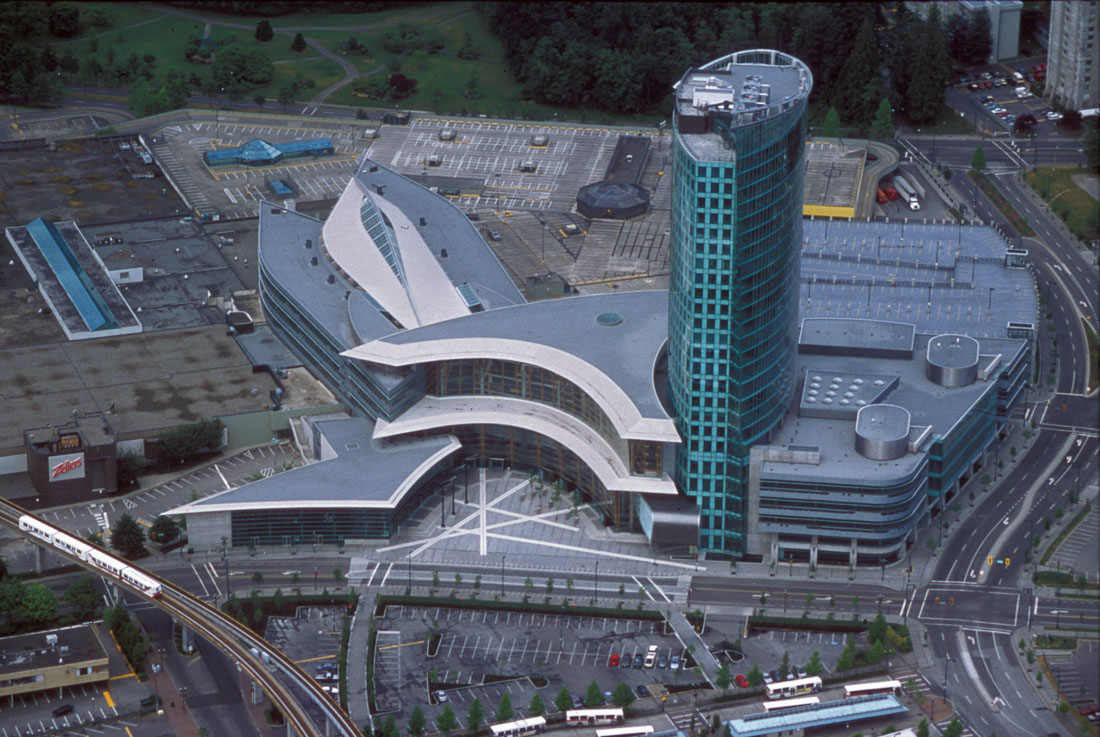
Central City

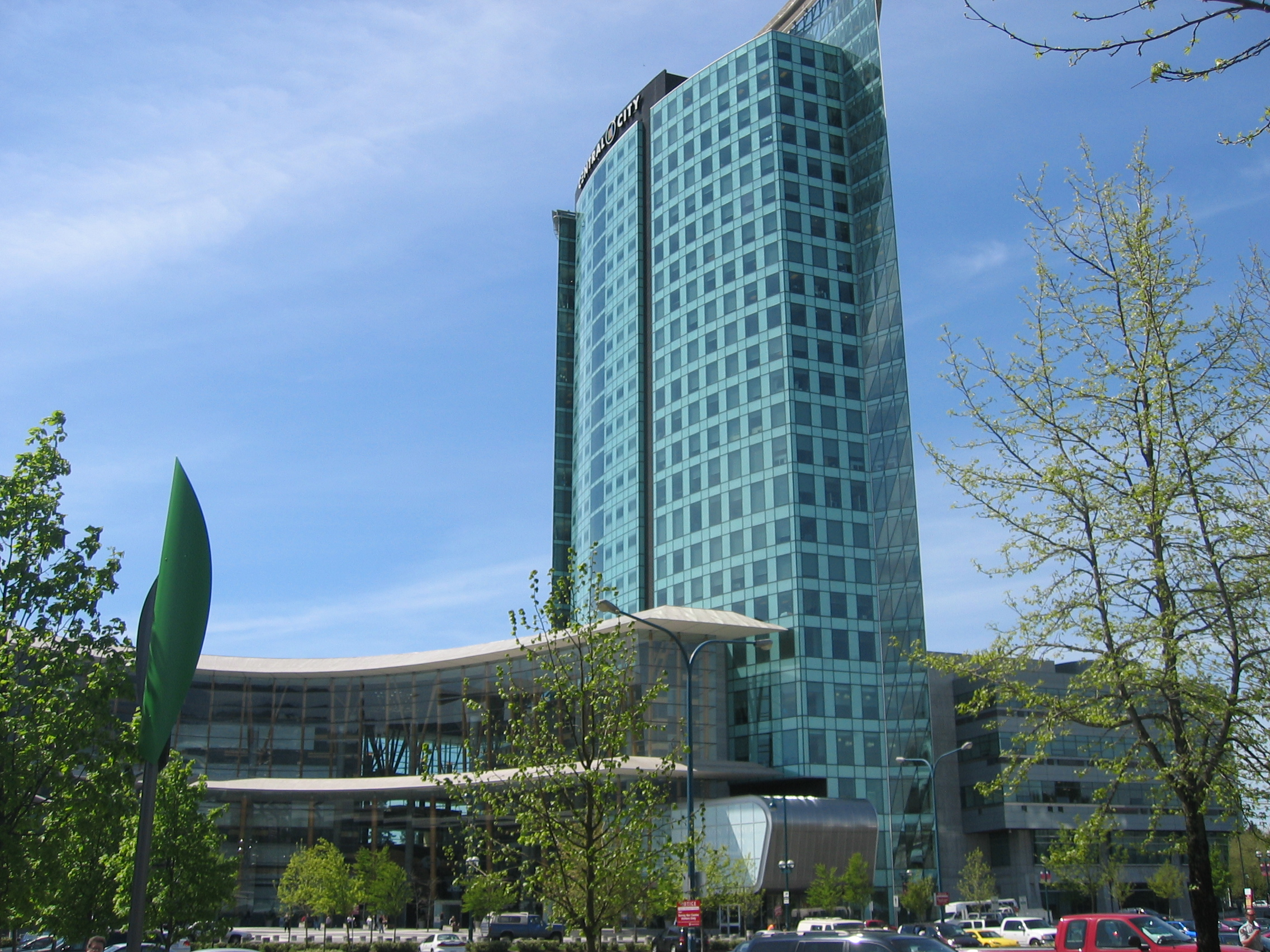
Central City

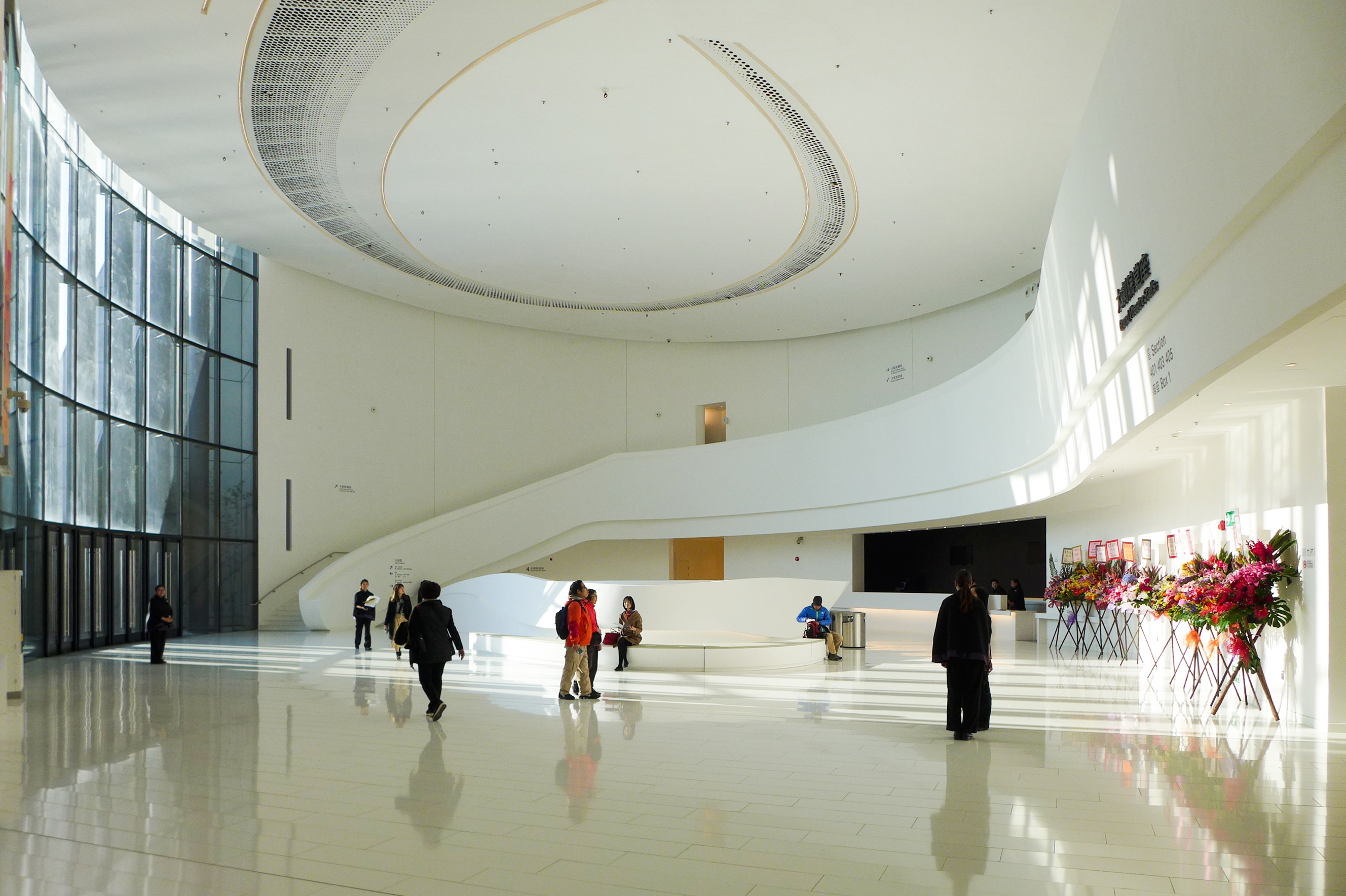
Xiqu Centre Theatre Lobby

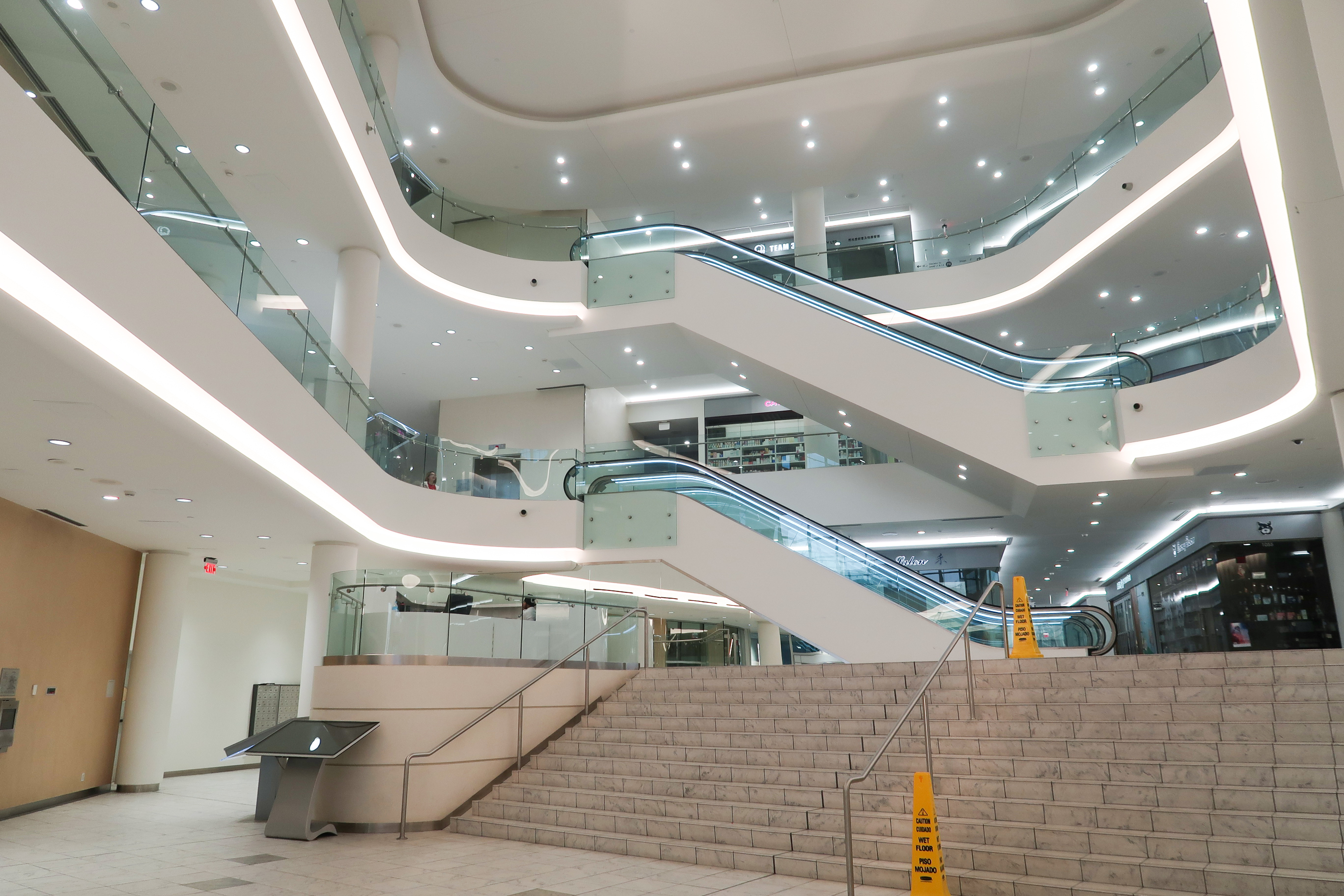
Aberdeen Square Atrium

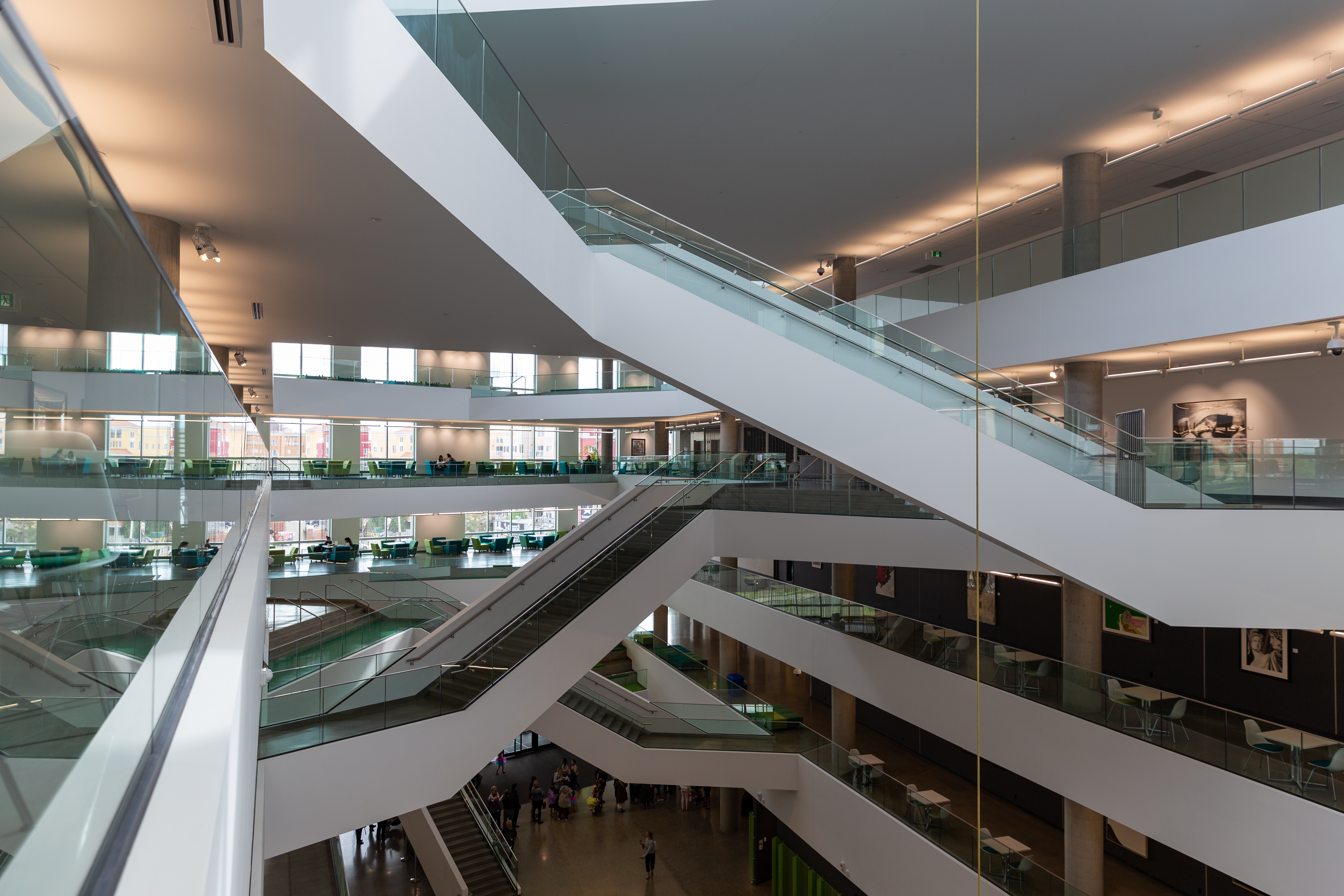
Allard Hall

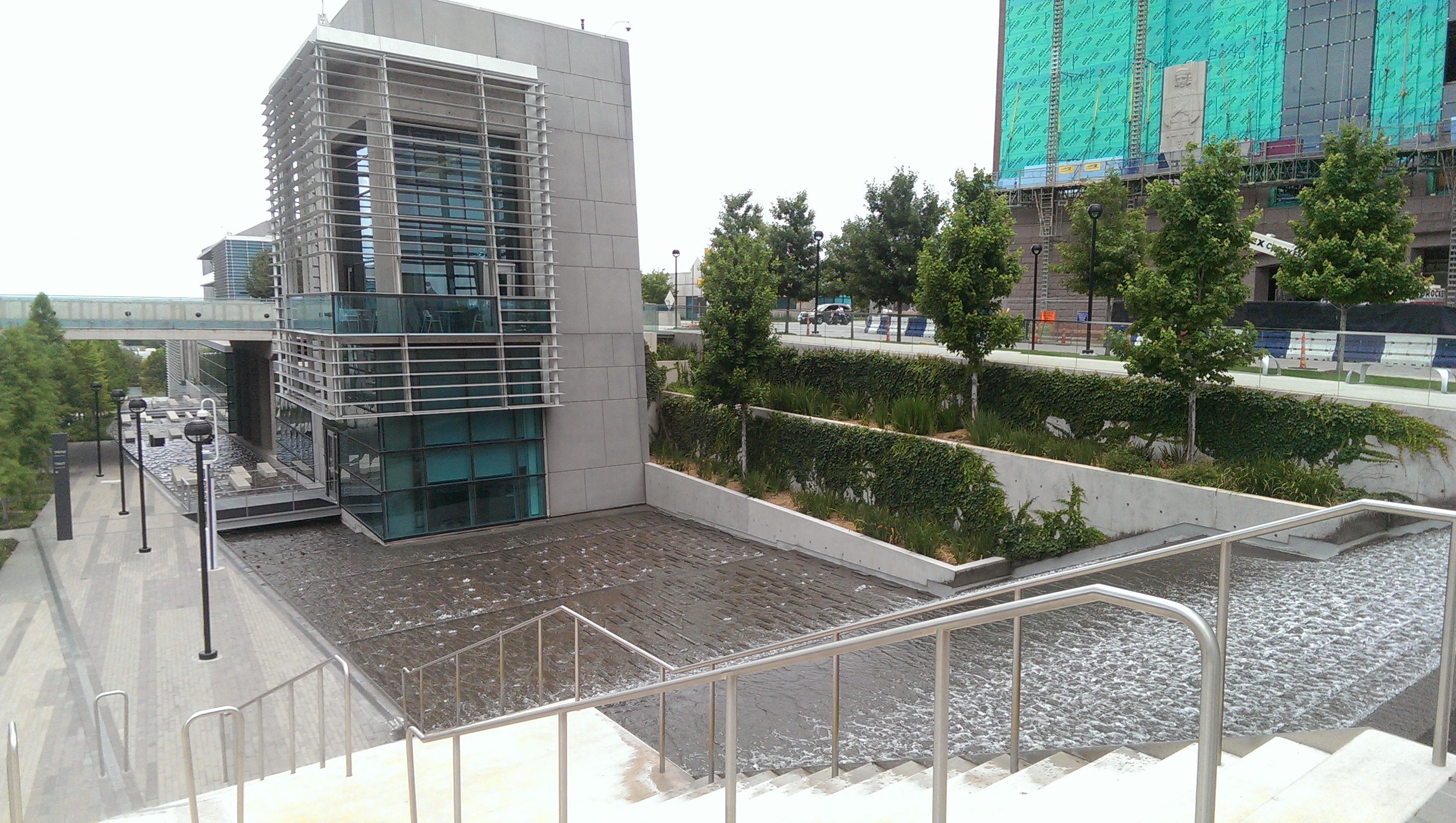
TCC Trinity River

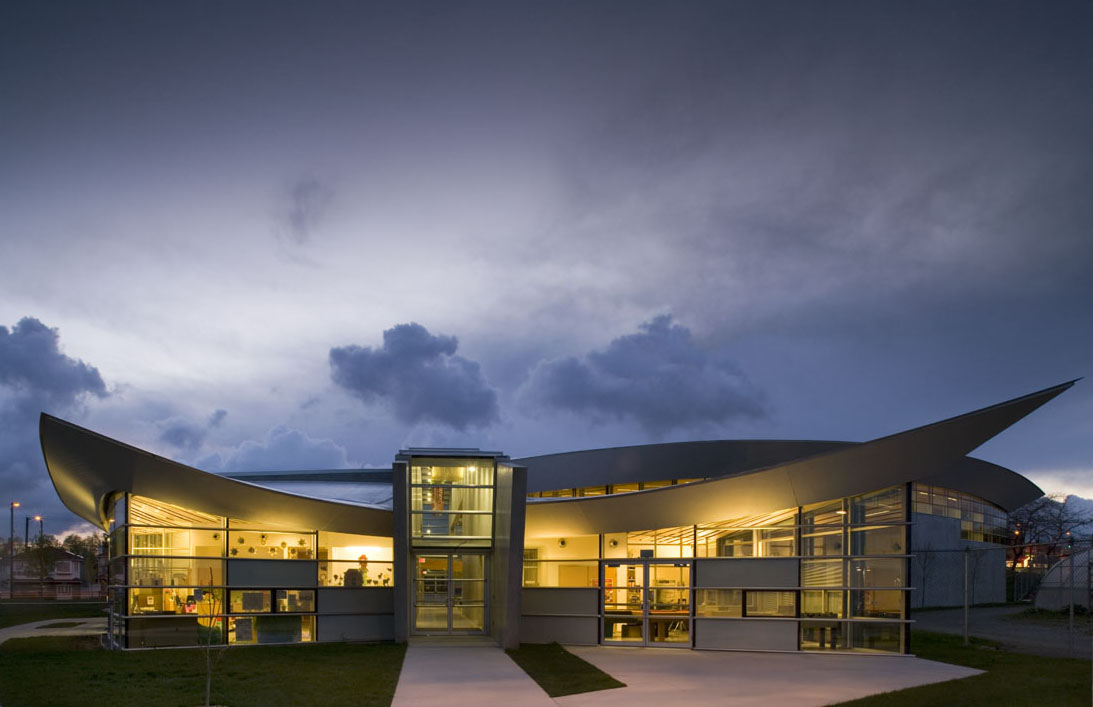
Sunset Community Centre, Vancouver

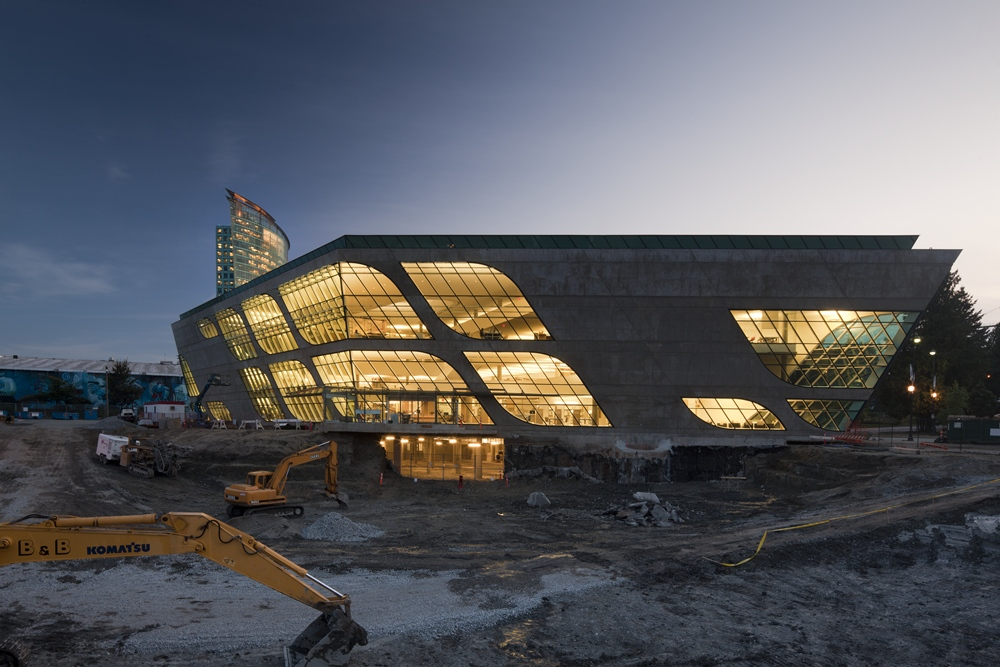
Surrey Centre Public Library

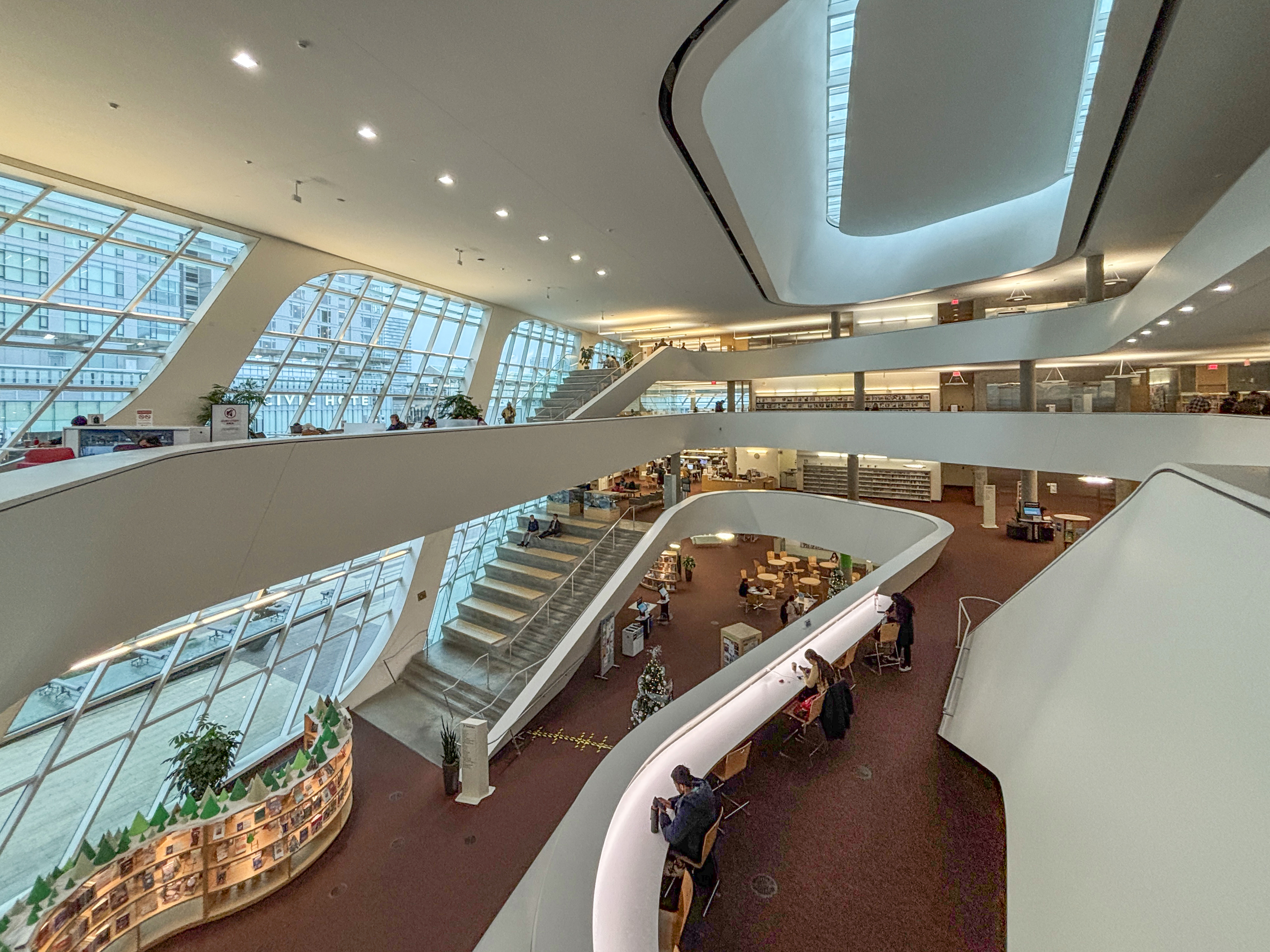
Surrey Centre Public Library

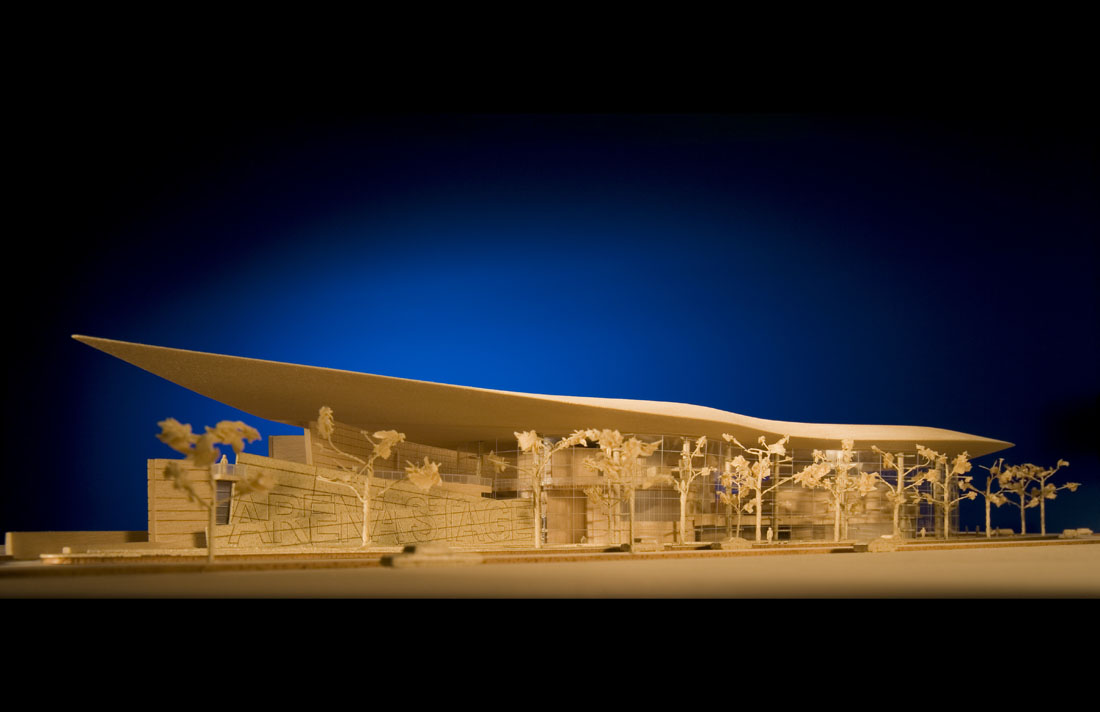
Model for the Arena Stage
