= Langdon (Washington, D.C.) =

- Neighborhood of Washington, D.C.
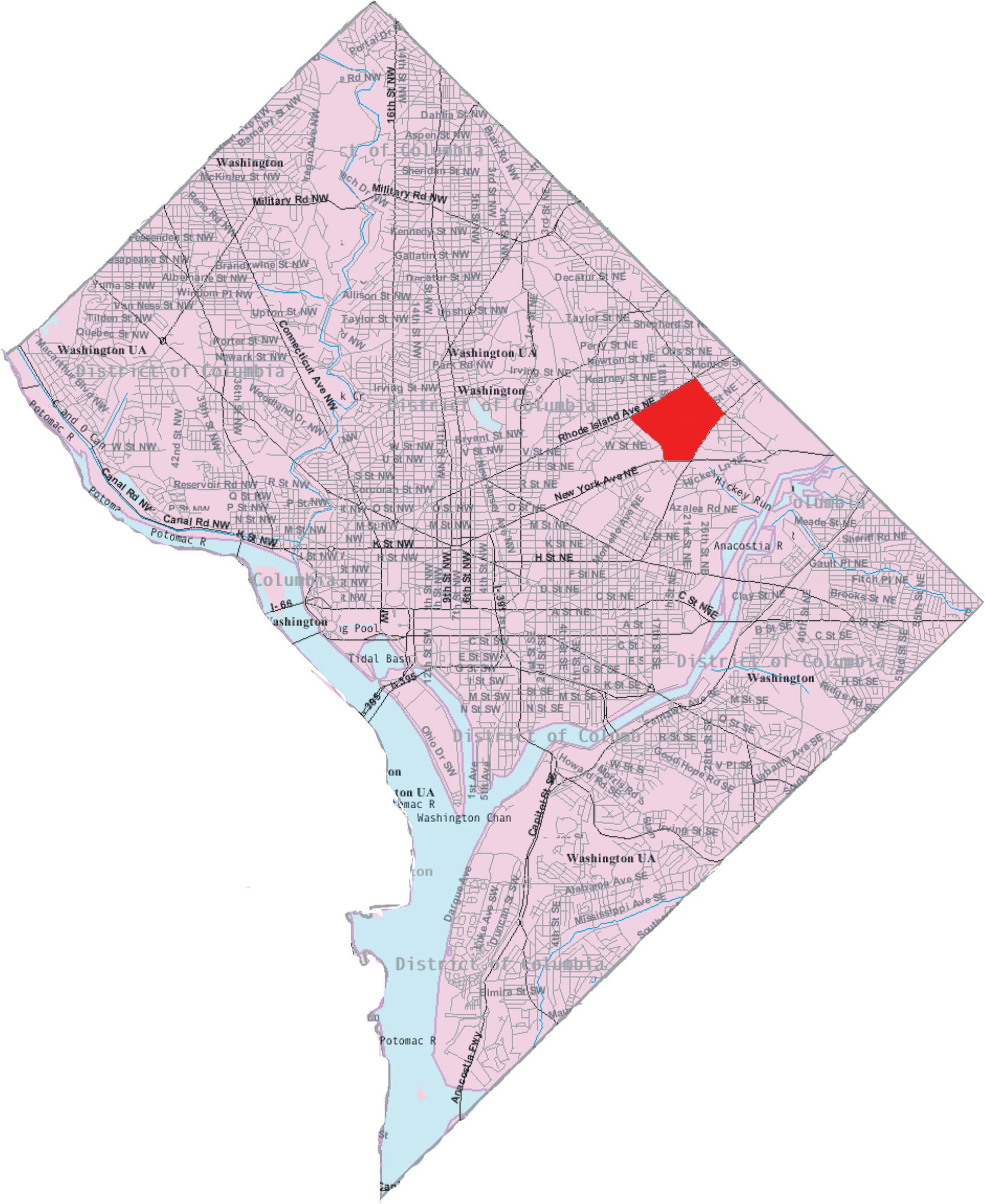
- Langdon within the District of Columbia
- Coordinates: 38.9228°N 76.9739°W
- Country: United States
- District: Washington, D.C.
- Ward: Ward 5

Government
  - Councilmember: Zachary Parker
- Postal code: ZIP code

Langdon is a neighborhood located in Ward 5 of Northeast Washington, D.C. Historical surveys of D.C. recognize Langdon as a neighborhood dating back to at least 1903. Langdon is bounded by Montana Ave. NE to the west/southwest, New York Ave. NE to the south, Bladensburg Rd. NE to the southeast, South Dakota Ave. NE to the northeast, and Rhode Island Ave. NE to the north/northwest. Langdon is adjacent to the Northeast D.C. neighborhoods of Brentwood (west), Woodridge (east), Fort Lincoln (southeast), Gateway (south), and Brookland (north).

== History ==
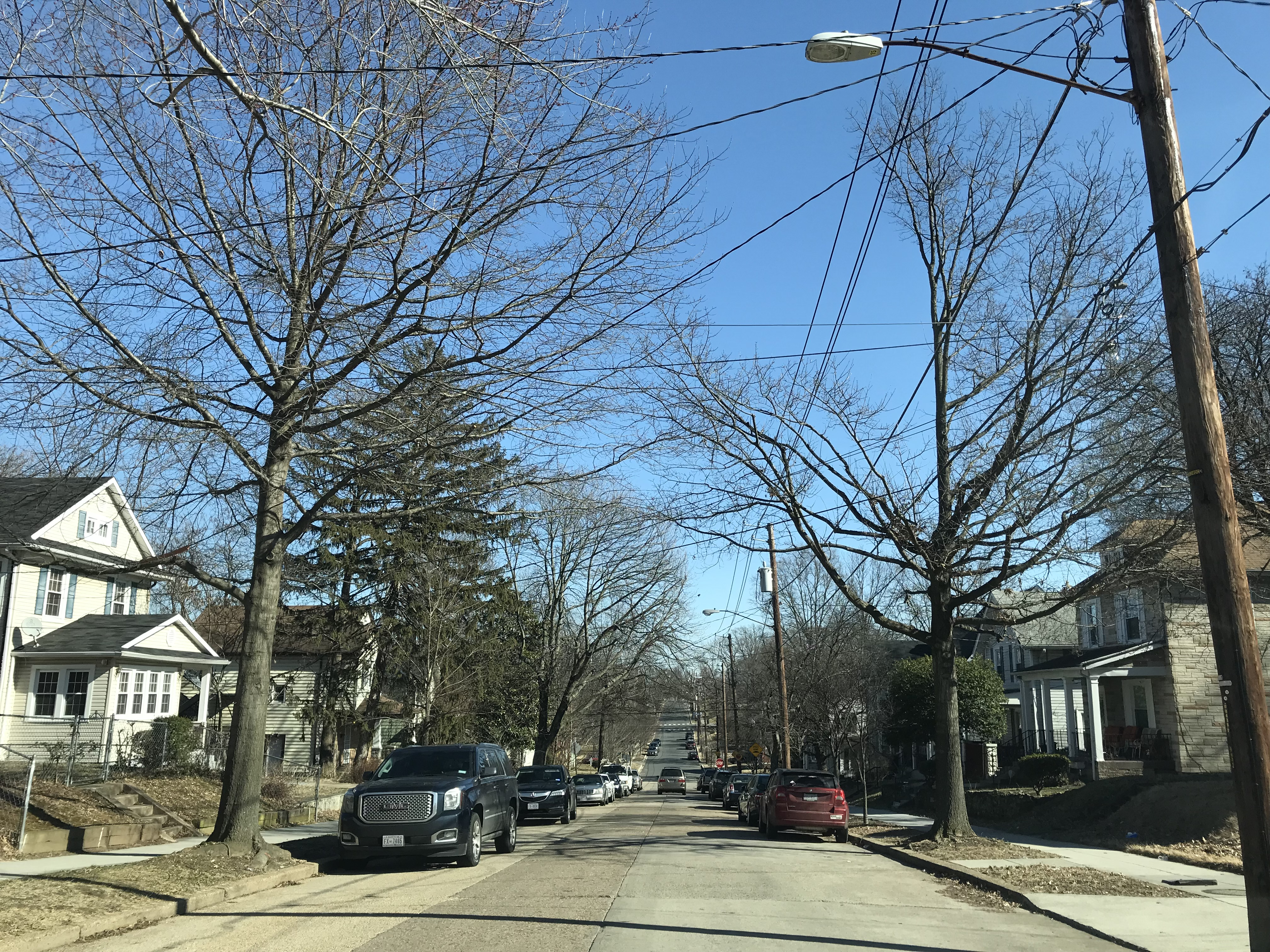
Intersection of Everts and 17th St. NE, in Langdon, in February 2019

Starting in 1632, the land comprising present-day Langdon was part of the Maryland colony. The non-county land was incorporated into Prince George's County with its creation in 1695. The land became part of Washington County, D.C. with its creation in 1801. A topographical survey map from 1793 shows the old Bladensburg Rd. (present-day Brentwood Rd. NE, a few fragments of which still dot the present-day grid just north of Rhode Island Ave. NE), running right by the land that would become the neighborhood. Washington County was integrated into the City of Washington in 1871.

In the early 1850s, much of the land that would become Langdon was purchased by a bronze sculptor named Clark Mills. Mills operated a foundry where a WMATA bus depot now stands (as of 2015). Mills Rd. NE was the original path leading up to this foundry. Maps from the late 1800s suggest a B&O Railroad station ("Mills Station") served the foundry and Mills' land.

The area served as the site of multiple reinforcements during the American Civil War (1861-1865), when a ring of forts, batteries, and trenches was built in the District of Columbia's periphery. Many of these fortifications were still intact as of the 1887 survey of D.C., but have since disappeared with little trace.

Many of the houses that today stand in the neighborhood were built starting with the extension of Rhode Island Ave. NE up from Boundary Rd. (now Florida Ave.) to Eastern Ave., and the building of the streetcar thereon, starting around 1890. The area was served by the Rhode Island Ave. streetcar until its dismantling in 1962.

Before being deemed unenforceable in the 1948 Supreme Court decision, Shelley v. Kraemer, many neighborhood homes were subject to restrictive covenants barring ownership by non-whites. At some point during the process of white flight in the 1960s, the neighborhood became majority black.

Since at least 1938, the neighborhood has been home to a large municipal park. Langdon Park's public swimming pool was chosen as the first place that Mayor Williams started the tradition of launching "DC's Summer Fun" by cannonball diving into a chosen pool. As recently as 2013, Langdon Park featured a small amphitheater, which featured performances of go-go bands.

== Present day ==
In 2014, a section of Langdon Park was renamed the Chuck Brown Memorial Park and redesigned as a memorial for go-go artist Chuck Brown. The plans initially included an improved amphitheater, to continue serving as a go-go performance venue, but neighborhood residents protested and eventually got the amphitheater removed from the plans. This resulted in the complete removal of the pre-existing go-go performance space. Nevertheless, there is an annual free go-go concert celebration on Chuck Brown's birthday, officially known as Chuck Brown Day.

The historically industrial south end of the neighborhood presently houses the large rock/electronic music venue Echostage as well as several nightclubs and a waste management facility. Capital Subdivision tracks separate the industrial sections of the neighborhood from the more residential ones.

Woodridge Library, a newly rebuilt municipal library branch, was constructed at the corner of 18th St. and Hamlin St. NE, and opened in September 2016.

In terms of transportation, residents of Langdon have access to the Rhode Island Avenue Metro station as well as access to Metrobus routes that serve the Rhode Island Avenue NE (Route 1) Corridor and Bladensburg Road NE Corridor.
