= Venelin Kokalov =

Canadian architect

- Born: July 8, 1967 (age 59)
- Education: University of Architecture, Civil Engineering and Geodesy

Venelin Kokalov is a Canadian architect and the Design Principal and Principal-in-Charge at Revery Architecture.

== Career ==
Previously, he worked as design principal for Bing Thom Architects before taking charge of the company, and rebranding it as Revery Architecture. Born in Bulgaria in 1967, Kokalov graduated university in 1993 with a master's degree in structural engineering from the University of Architecture, Civil Engineering and Geodesy in Sofia, Bulgaria.

In 2002, he immigrated to Canada, where he joined Vancouver-based firm Bing Thom Architects. In 2016 Bing Thom died, and in 2017 the studio officially changed its name to Revery Architecture. Since 2016 Venelin Kokalov has continued to lead the Revery team to design and build projects around the world, from the MacEwan University, Allard Hall in Edmonton (2017) to the Xiqu Centre Opera House and University of Chicago's Campus, both in Hong-Kong

== Recognition ==
Since 2016 Revery Architecture has been recognized with the following awards:

- Azure Magazine's 2019 AZ Award of Merit – Multi-Unit Residential Architecture - 1245 Harwood, Vancouver, BC - Canada
- 2019 Hong Kong Green Building Council (HKGBC) - Green Building Merit Award – New Buildings Category: Completed Projects – Institutional Building - Xiqu Centre, Hong Kong China.
- 2019 A&D Trophy Award – Professional Architecture, Best of Category: Institutional - Xiqu Centre, Hong Kong China.
- 2019 DFA Design For Asia Awards – Grand Award Winner - Xiqu Centre, Hong Kong China.
- 2019 MIPIM Asia Awards – Gold Winner, Best Infrastructure Development - Xiqu Centre, Hong Kong China.
- 2019 AFBC Architectural Awards – Lieutenant Governor Medal Award, - Xiqu Centre, Hong Kong China.
- 2019 AFBC Architectural Awards – Lieutenant Governor Merit Award - The Hong Kong Jockey Club University of Chicago Academic Complex | The University of Chicago Francis and Rose Yuen Campus, Hong Kong - China.
- BCI Asia – FuturArc Green Leadership Award 2019 – Merit Award, Institutional Category - The Hong Kong Jockey Club University of Chicago Academic Complex | The University of Chicago Francis and Rose Yuen Campus, Hong Kong - China.
- 2019 SCUP Excellence in Architecture – Merit Award for Building Additions, Renovation or Adaptive Reuse - - The Hong Kong Jockey Club University of Chicago Academic Complex | The University of Chicago Francis and Rose Yuen Campus, Hong Kong - China.
- HKIA Cross-Strait Architectural Design Award 2019 – Education & Religious Projects – Gold Award - The Hong Kong Jockey Club University of Chicago Academic Complex | The University of Chicago Francis and Rose Yuen Campus, Hong Kong - China.
- Prix Versailles Campuses: 2019 World Selection – Special Prize Interior - The Hong Kong Jockey Club University of Chicago Academic Complex | The University of Chicago Francis and Rose Yuen Campus, Hong Kong - China.
- The Chicago Athenaeum International Architecture Award 2019 – Restoration/Renovation - The Hong Kong Jockey Club University of Chicago Academic Complex | The University of Chicago Francis and Rose Yuen Campus, Hong Kong - China.
- 2018/2019 HKIA Special Architectural Award – Heritage & Adaptive Re-use - The Hong Kong Jockey Club University of Chicago Academic Complex | The University of Chicago Francis and Rose Yuen Campus, Hong Kong - China.
- 2020 Civic Distinction Awards of Excellence - Design Award - Interiors - Simon Fraser University's Sustainable Energy and Engineering Building.
- 2020 Civic Distinction Awards of Excellence - Design Award - Institutional - Simon Fraser University's Sustainable Energy and Engineering Building.
- USITT 2021 Architecture Honor Award, Xiqu Centre, Hong Kong China.
