= Woodridge Neighborhood Library =

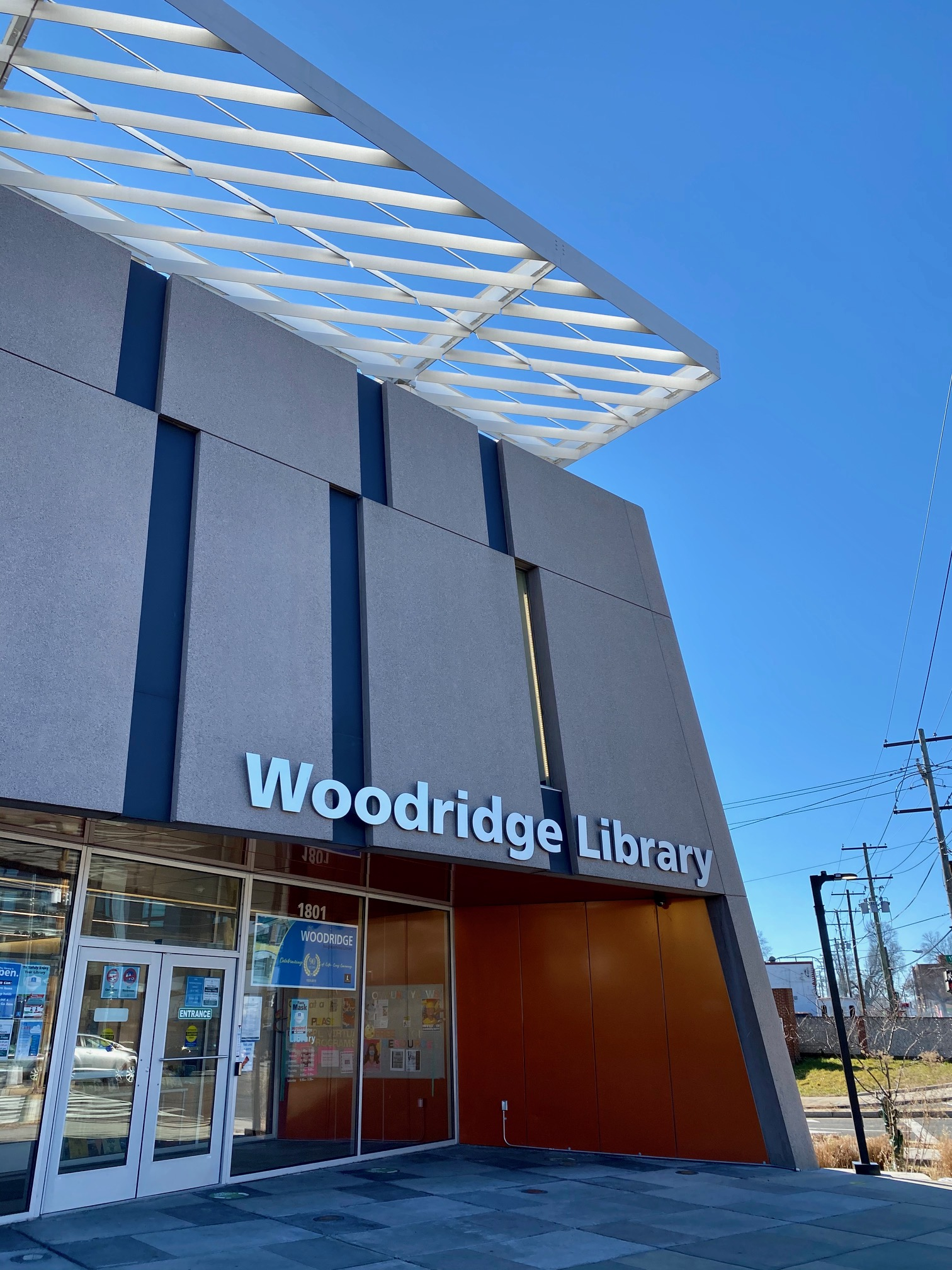
- Woodridge Neighborhood Library in 2021
- 38.927517°N 76.978716°W
- Location: 1801 Hamlin Street NE Washington, DC 20018, United States
- Type: Public library
- Established: 1958; reopened 2016
- Branch of: District of Columbia Public Library

Other information
- Website: https://www.dclibrary.org/woodridge

The Woodridge Neighborhood Library is a branch of the District of Columbia Public Library in the Woodridge neighborhood of Washington, D.C. It is located at 1801 Hamlin Street NE. A small sub-branch library at 2206 Rhode Island Ave NE served the neighborhood starting in 1929, and a full-fledged library branch opened at the current site in 1958. It was replaced in 2016 by a new, 20,000-square-foot library built at a cost of $16.5 million, after nearly three years of construction. The new building was designed by Wiencek & Associates and Bing Thom Architects.

The new library's roof terrace is the first of its kind in the city. It is used for library and community programming, including concerts hosted by the DC Punk Archive.
