= 2020 Council of the District of Columbia election =

US Election

- November 3, 2020 (Note: Special election on June 16, 2020)

5 seats on the Council of the District of Columbia (Note: Excluding special election) 7 seats needed for a majority
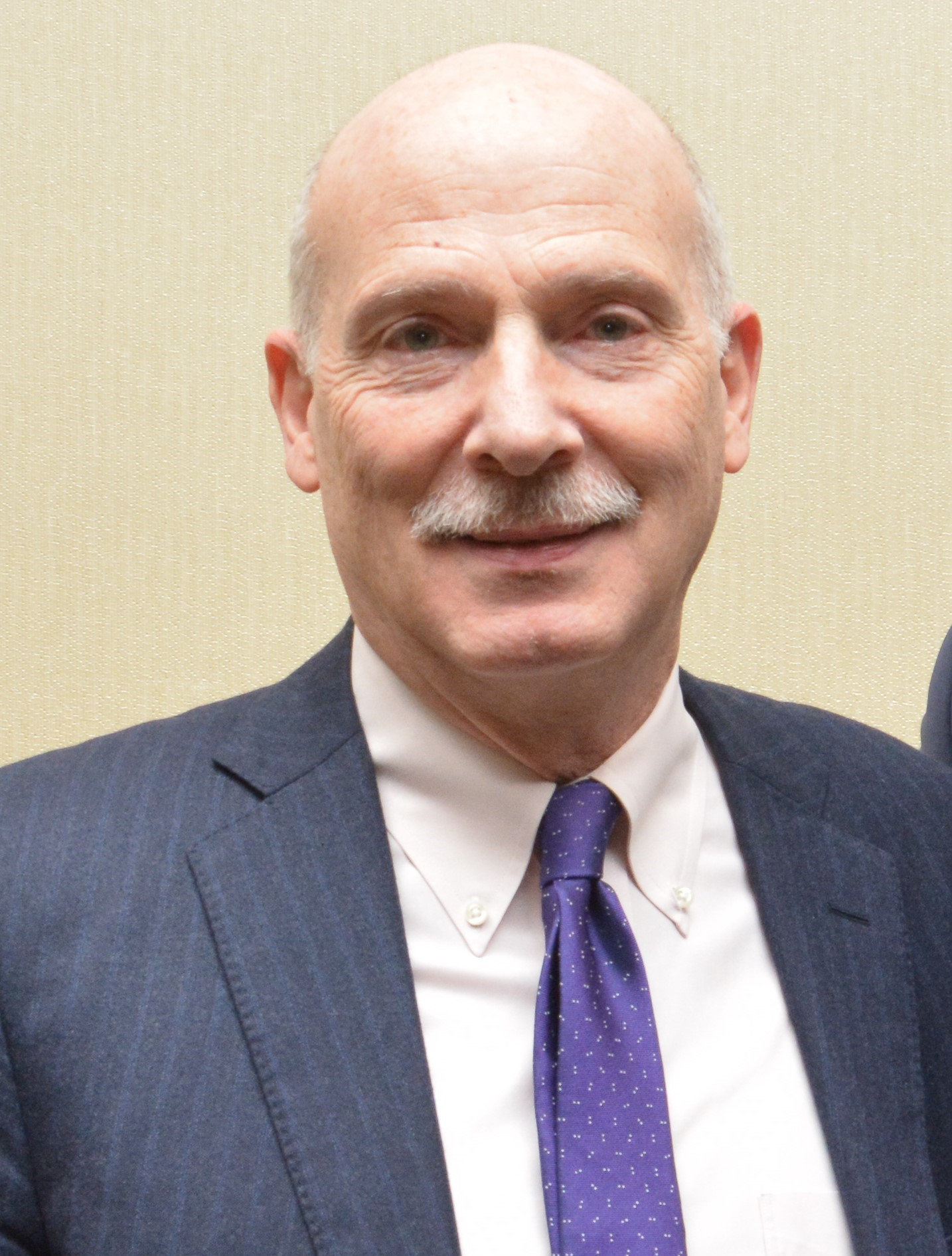

	Majority party	Minority party
Leader	Phil Mendelson
Party	Democratic	Independent
Seats before	11	2
Seats after	11	2
Seat change	Steady	Steady
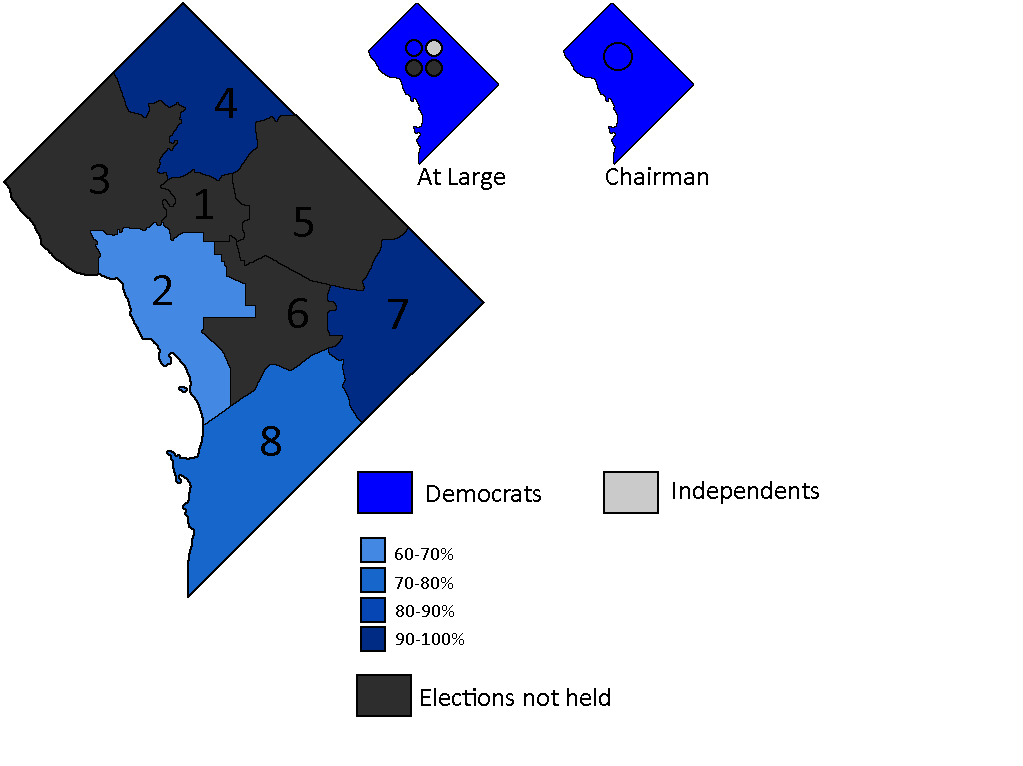
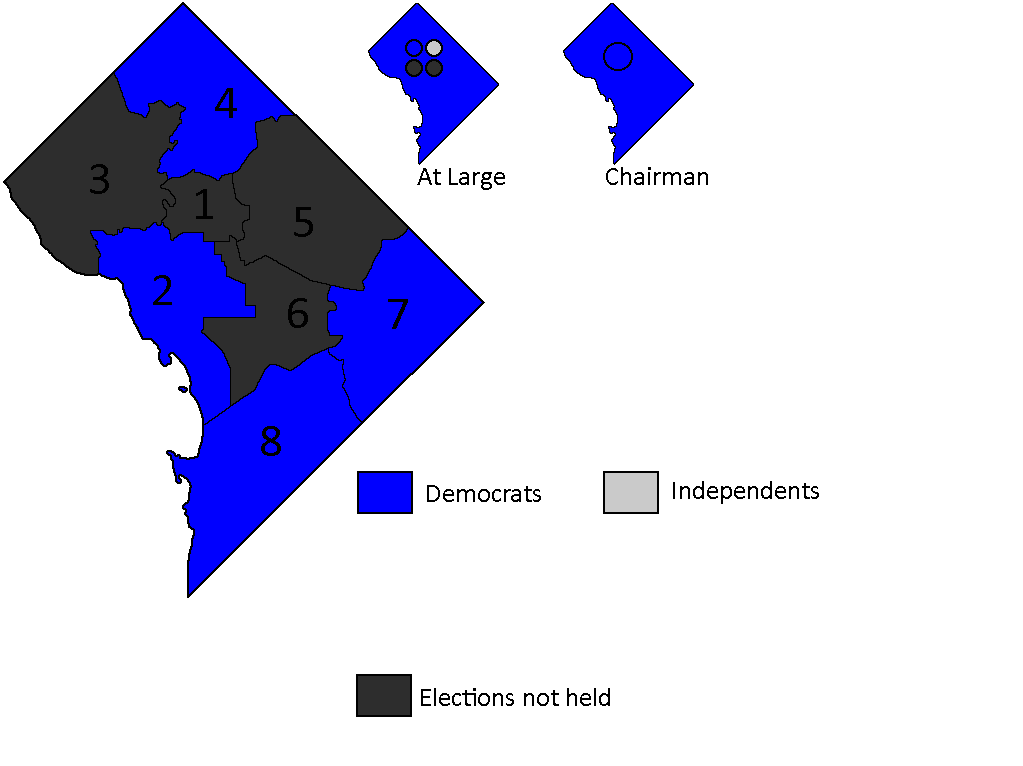
Chair of the Council before election
Phil Mendelson
Democratic
Elected Chair of the Council
Phil Mendelson
Democratic

The 2020 general election for Council of the District of Columbia was held on November 3, with a special election for ward 2 held on June 27. Elections were held for the seats of four out of the eight wards and two of the four at-large seats. The Democratic Party retained its control of the city council, with the council becaming majority female for the first time since the 1998 election.

Ward 2 councilmember Jack Evans resigned from the city council due to a corruption scandal, triggering a special election. Despite resigning, Evans unsuccessfully ran for his seat in the Democratic primary, which was won by Brooke Pinto. Incumbent councilors Robert White, Pinto, Vincent C. Gray, and Trayon White won reelection. Janeese Lewis George won election to the city council after defeating incumbent councilor Brandon Todd, while David Grosso retired and was succeeded by Christina Henderson.

This was the first city council election to have public campaign financing with $3.4 million being given to candidates, with George being given the most at $281,055 during the campaign.

== Background ==
Mayor Muriel Bowser won reelection in the 2018 election becoming the first mayor to win reelection since 2002. The District of Columbia Home Rule Act states that "not more than two of the at-large members shall be nominated by the same political party", which results in the Democratic Party being unable to run in all at-large districts. David Catania, a member of the city council from 1997 to 2015, was the last member of the Republican Party elected to the council, but changed his political affiliation to independent in 2004.

== Summary ==
Democrats remained the largest party on the council, with no seats being lost to other parties or independents.

=== At-large ===
Position	Incumbent				Candidates
Position	Member	Party	First elected	Status	Candidates
At-large	Robert White	Democratic	2013 (special)	Incumbent re-elected.	▌ ✓ Robert White (Democratic) 25.96%; ▌ ✓ Christina Henderson (Independent) 14.77%; ▌ Vincent Orange (Independent) 12.01%; ▌ Ed Lazere (Independent) 11.54%; ▌ Marcus Goodwin (Independent) 11.31%; ▌ Markus Batchelor (Independent) 3.56%; ▌ Marya Pickering (Republican) 3.33%; ▌ Mónica Palacio (Independent) 2.54%
At-large	David Grosso	Independent	2014	Incumbent retired. New member elected.	▌ ✓ Robert White (Democratic) 25.96%; ▌ ✓ Christina Henderson (Independent) 14.77%; ▌ Vincent Orange (Independent) 12.01%; ▌ Ed Lazere (Independent) 11.54%; ▌ Marcus Goodwin (Independent) 11.31%; ▌ Markus Batchelor (Independent) 3.56%; ▌ Marya Pickering (Republican) 3.33%; ▌ Mónica Palacio (Independent) 2.54%

=== Wards ===
Position	Incumbent				Candidates
Position	Member	Party	First elected	Status	Candidates
Ward 2	Brooke Pinto	Democratic	2014	Incumbent re-elected.	▌ ✓ Brooke Pinto (Democratic) 68.30%; ▌ Randy Downs (Independent) 20.60%; ▌ Martin Miguel Fernandez (Independent) 7.17%
Ward 4	Brandon Todd	Democratic	2015 (special)	Incumbent lost re-election New member elected. Democratic hold.	▌ ✓ Janeese Lewis George (Democratic) 91.76%; ▌ Perry Redd (D.C. Statehood Green) 5.73%
Ward 7	Vincent Gray	Democratic	2016	Incumbent re-elected	▌ ✓ Vincent Gray (Democratic) 94.47%
Ward 8	Trayon White	Democratic	2016	Incumbent re-elected.	▌ ✓ Trayon White (Democratic) 78.84%; ▌ Fred Hill (Independent) 14.76%; ▌ Christopher Cole (Independent) 3.18%; ▌ Nate Derenge (Republican) 2.23%

== At-large ==
2020 Council of the District of Columbia At-large Election
- November 3, 2020
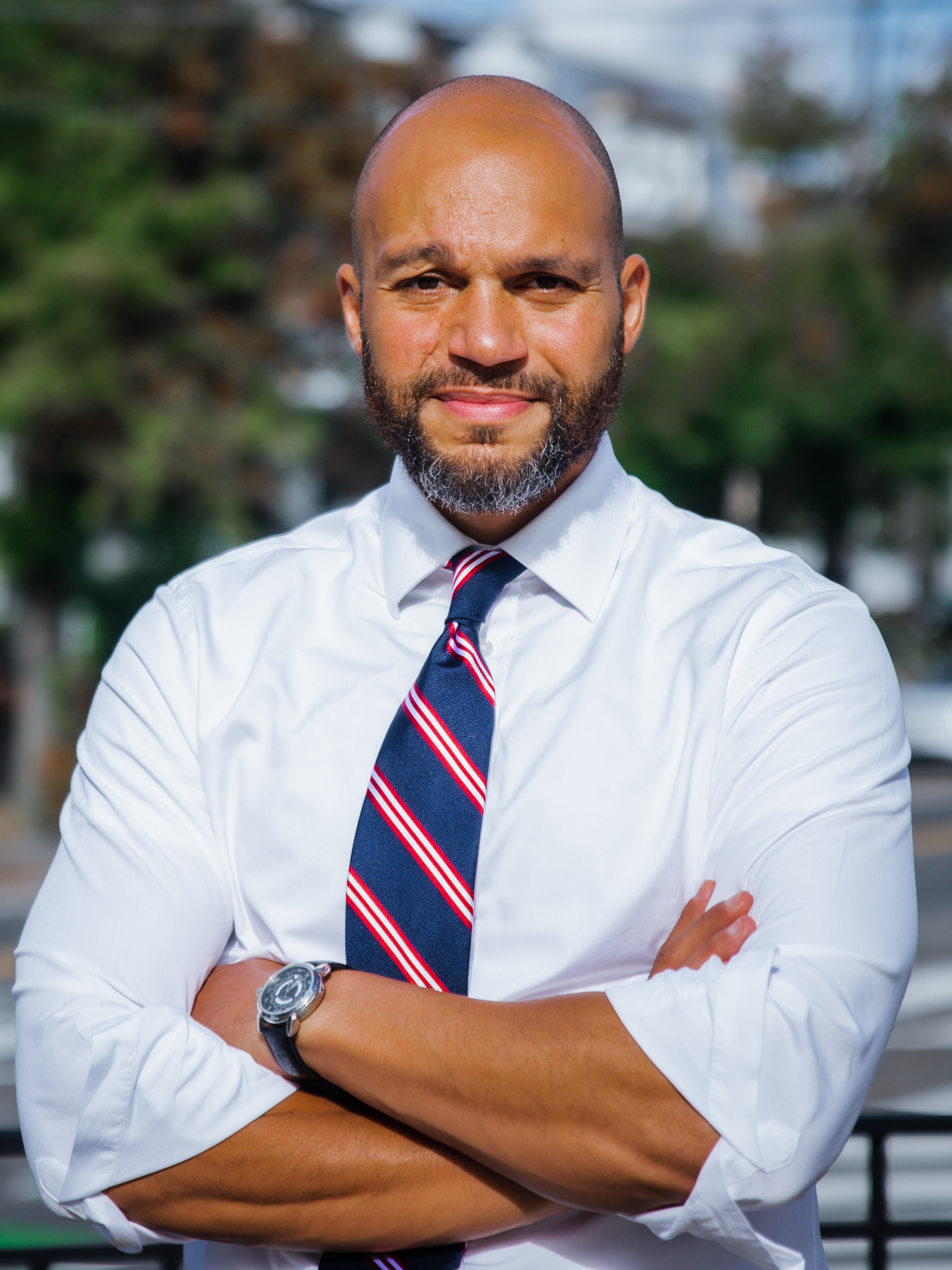

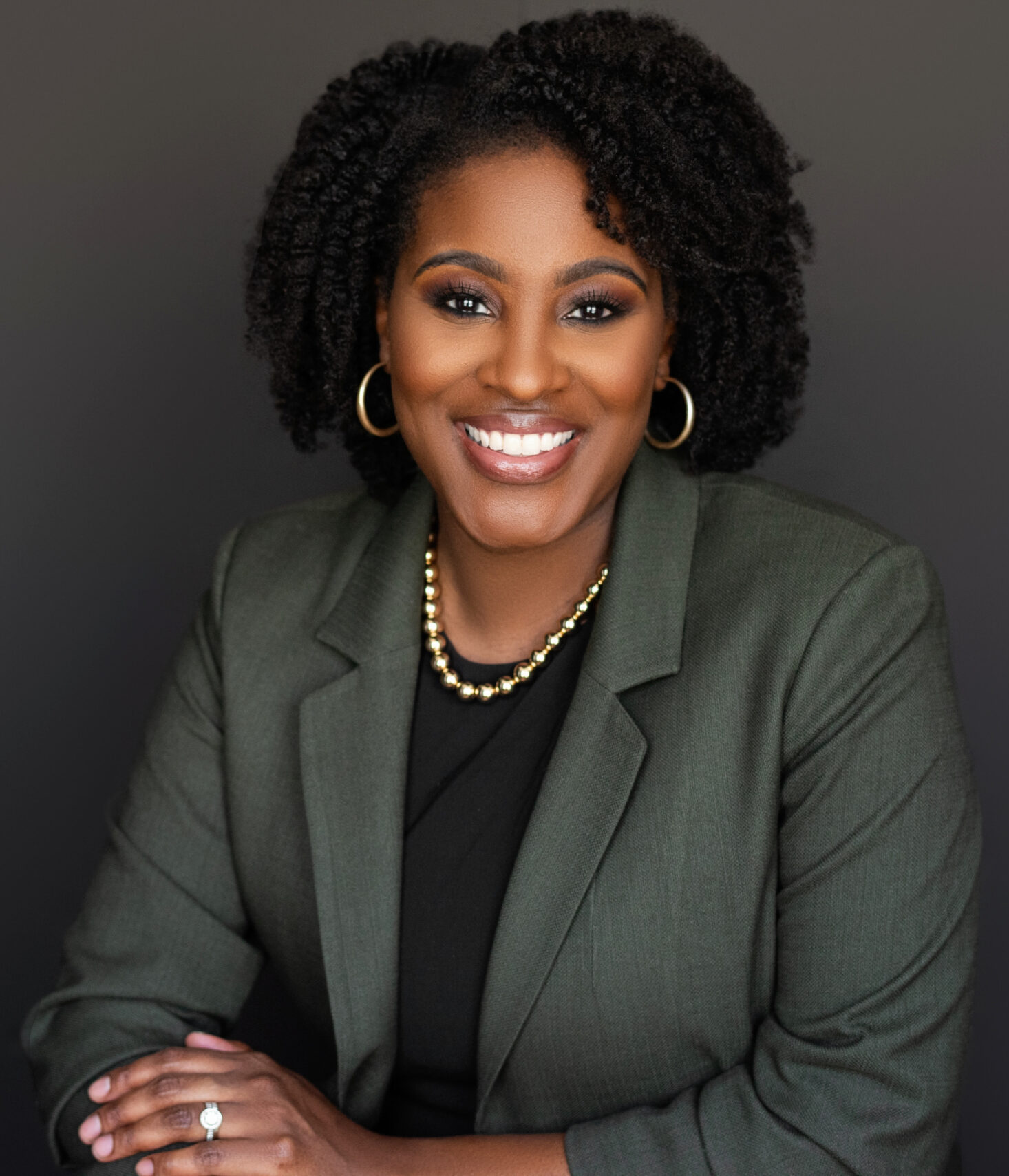

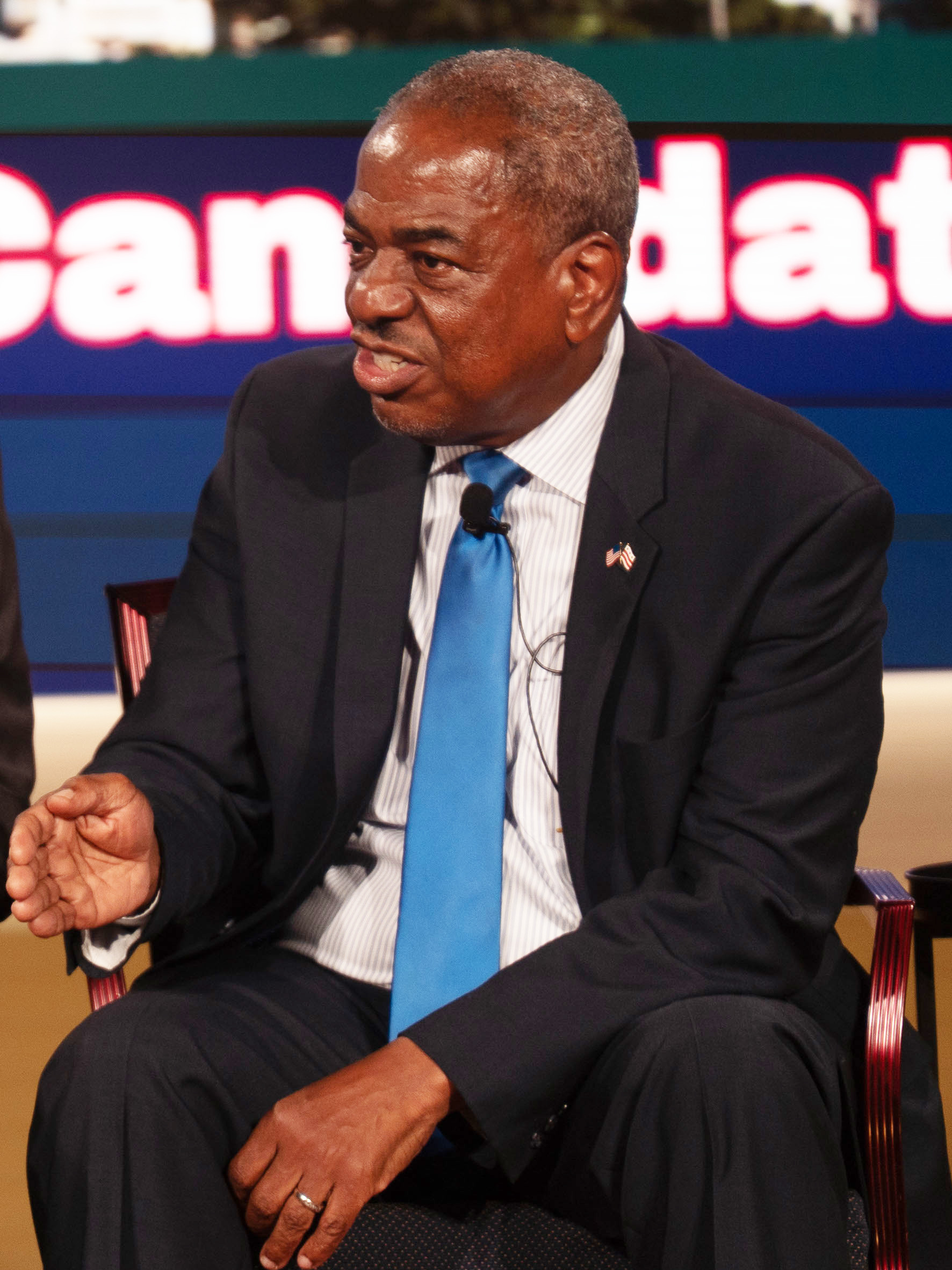

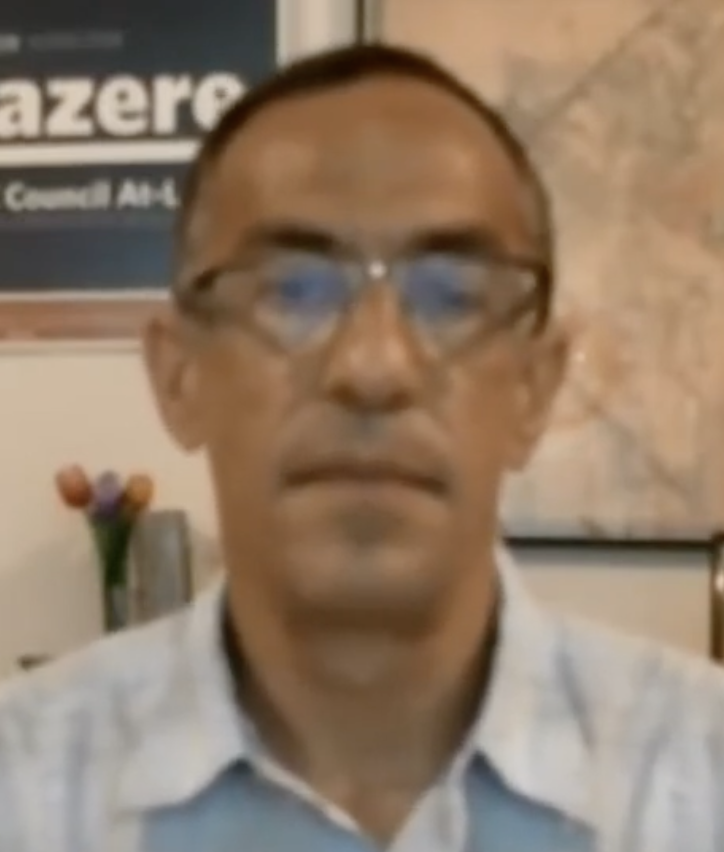

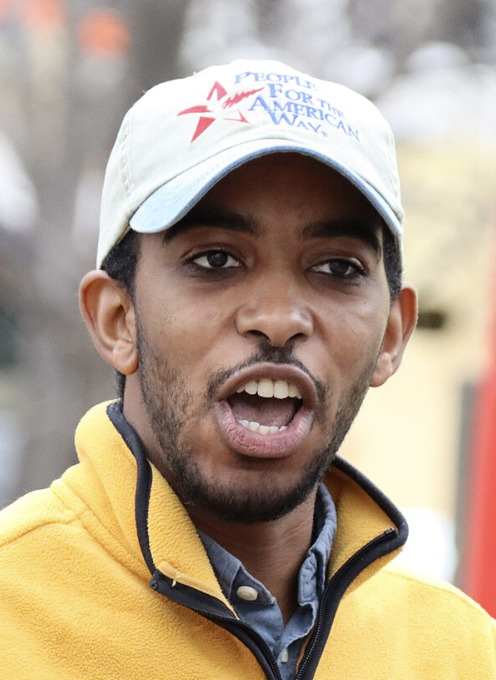
Nominee	Robert White	Christina Henderson	Vincent Orange
Party	Democratic	Independent	Independent
Popular vote	139,208	79,189	64,389
Percentage	25.96%	14.77%	12.01%
Nominee	Ed Lazere	Marcus Goodwin	Markus Batchelor
Party	Independent	Independent	Independent
Popular vote	61,882	60,636	19,095
Percentage	11.54%	11.31%	3.56%
Councilmember before election
Robert White (Dem.)
David Grosso (Ind.)
Elected Councilmember
Robert White (Dem.)
Christina Henderson (Ind.)

David Grosso, an independent member of the city council, announced that he would not seek reelection in 2020. Robert White announced that he would seek reelection on October 29, 2019.

White won renomination in the Democratic primary without opposition. White and Henderson won in the general election.

=== Democratic primary ===
Candidates

- Robert White, at-large member of the Council of the District of Columbia (2016–present)

Endorsements

Robert White

Labor unions

- Amalgamated Transit Union local 689
- AFL-CIO Metropolitan Washington Council
- International Brotherhood of Teamsters local 639
- SEIU local 1199
- United Food and Commercial Workers local 400
- Washington Teachers' Union

Local officials

- Anita Bonds, former at-large member of the Council of the District of Columbia
- Jack Jacobson, member of the District of Columbia State Board of Education from Ward 2
- Zachary Parker, member of the District of Columbia State Board of Education from the Ward 5
- Elissa Silverman, at-large member of the Council of the District of Columbia
- Joe Weedon, former member of the District of Columbia State Board of Education from Ward 6

Organizations

- Capital Stonewall Democrats
- DC Young Democrats
- Greater Greater Washington
- National Nurses United
- National Organization for Women
- Planned Parenthood
- Sierra Club

2020 Council of the District of Columbia At-large Democratic primary
Party	Candidate	Votes	%
Democratic	Robert White (incumbent)	93,264	97.22%
Write-in		2,669	2.78%
Total votes		95,933	100.00%

=== Libertarian primary ===
Candidates

- Joe Bishop-Henchman

2020 Council of the District of Columbia At-large Libertarian primary
Party	Candidate	Votes	%
Libertarian	Joe Bishop-Henchman	135	86.54%
Write-in		21	13.46%
Total votes		156	100.00%

=== Republican primary ===
Candidates

- Marya Pickering, business consultant

2020 Council of the District of Columbia At-large Republican primary
Party	Candidate	Votes	%
Republican	Marya Pickering	2,056	90.18%
Write-in		224	9.82%
Total votes		2,280	100.00%

=== Statehood Green party ===
Candidates

- Ann C. Wilcox

2020 Council of the District of Columbia At-large Statehood Green primary
Party	Candidate	Votes	%
DC Statehood Green	Ann C. Wilcox	409	85.39%
Write-in		70	14.61%
Total votes		479	100.00%

=== Independents ===
Candidates

- Claudia Barragán, former council staffer
- Markus Batchelor, vice-president of the District of Columbia State Board of Education
- Mario Cristaldo, non-profit executive
- Franklin Garcia, Shadow Representative from the District of Columbia (2015-2021)
- Marcus Goodwin, real estate developer and Democratic candidate for at-large councilmember in 2018
- Calvin Gurley, accountant and perennial candidate
- Christina Henderson, former Council staffer and legislative assistant for U.S. Senator Chuck Schumer
- Kathy Henderson, former ANC commissioner
- A'Shia Howard, office manager
- Chander Jayaraman, former chair of ANC 6B
- Will Merrifield, tenant rights attorney
- Ed Lazere, executive director of the DC Fiscal Policy Institute
- Jeanné Lewis, non-profit executive
- Vincent Orange, member of the Council of the District of Columbia from the at-large district (2011–2016) and from Ward 5 (1999-2007)
- Alexander Padro, former chair of ANC 2G
- Mónica Palacio, director of the District of Columbia Office of Human Rights
- Eric Rogers, former council aide
- Michangelo Scruggs, podiatrist
- Keith Silver, former ANC commissioner
- Claudia Barragán, former council staffer

Withdrawn

- Rick Murphree, ANC commissioner

Declined

- David Grosso, incumbent at-large councilmember
- Michael Brown, former at-large member councilmember

Endorsements

Markus Batchelor

Federal officials

- Nate Fleming, former Shadow Representative from Washington, D.C.

Labor unions

- Washington Teachers' Union

Local officials

- Emily Gasoi, member of the District of Columbia State Board of Education from Ward 1
- Frazier O’Leary, member of the District of Columbia State Board of Education from Ward 4
- Ruth Wattenberg, member of the District of Columbia State Board of Education from Ward 3
- Joe Weedon, former member of the District of Columbia State Board of Education from Ward 6

Organizations

- United We Dream Action Fund
- People for the American Way
Franklin Garcia

Local officials

- Paul Strauss, Shadow senator from the District of Columbia (1997-present)
- Michael Brown, Shadow senator from the District of Columbia (2007-2025)
- Charles Moreland, former Shadow representative from the District of Columbia (1991-1995)
Marcus Goodwin

Federal officials

- Kweisi Mfume, member of the United States House of Representatives from Maryland's 7th congressional district

Labor unions

- International Brotherhood of Teamsters Local 639

Local officials

- Vincent C. Gray, member of the Council of the District of Columbia from Ward 7
- Charlene Drew Jarvis, former member of the Council of the District of Columbia from Ward 4
- William Lightfoot, former at-large member of the Council of the District of Columbia
- Frank Smith, former member of the Council of the District of Columbia from Ward 1

Organizations

- Emgage

Publications

- The Washington Post
Christina Henderson

Local officials

- Mary Cheh, member of the Council of the District of Columbia from the Ward 3
- David Grosso, at-large member of the Council of the District of Columbia
- Jack Jacobson, member of the District of Columbia State Board of Education from Ward 2
- Jessica Sutter, member of the District of Columbia State Board of Education from Ward 6

Publications

- The Washington Post
Ed Lazere

Labor unions

- American Federation of State, County and Municipal Employees local 20
- Amalgamated Transit Union local 689
- AFL-CIO Metro Washington Council
- International Brotherhood of Electrical Workers local 26
- LiUNA local 11
- Nonprofit Professional Employees Union
- SEIU locals 32BJ, 500, 1199
- UNITE HERE locals 23, 25
- United Food and Commercial Workers local 400

Local officials

- Emily Gasoi, member of the District of Columbia State Board of Education from Ward
- Janeese Lewis George, at-large candidate for Council of the District of Columbia
- Brianne Nadeau, member of the Council of the District of Columbia from Ward 1
- Zachary Parker, member of the District of Columbia State Board of Education from Ward 5
- Karl Racine, Attorney General for the District of Columbia
- Elissa Silverman, at-large member of the Council of the District of Columbia
- Ruth Wattenberg, member of the District of Columbia State Board of Education from Ward 3
- Karen Williams, member of the District of Columbia State Board of Education from Ward 7
- Dyana Forester, president of the Metropolitan Washington AFL-CIO

Organizations

- 350.org DC
- DC for Democracy
- Greater Greater Washington
- Jews United for Justice
- Metro DC Democratic Socialists of America
- National Nurses United
- National Organization for Women
- Our Revolution
- Progressive Change Campaign Committee
- Sierra Club
- Sunrise Movement
- Working Families Party
Vincent Orange

Organizations

- Apartment and Office Building Association of Metropolitan Washington
- DC Association of Realtors
Alexander Padro

Organizations

- LGBTQ Victory Fund

=== General election ===
2020 Council of the District of Columbia At-large election
Party	Candidate	Votes	%
Democratic	Robert White (incumbent)	139,208	25.96%
Independent	Christina Henderson	79,189	14.77%
Independent	Vincent Orange	64,389	12.01%
Independent	Ed Lazere	61,882	11.54%
Independent	Marcus Goodwin	60,636	11.31%
Independent	Markus Batchelor	19,095	3.56%
Republican	Marya Pickering	17,883	3.33%
Independent	Mónica Palacio	13,635	2.54%
DC Statehood Green	Ann C. Wilcox	9,793	1.83%
Independent	Franklin Garcia	8,972	1.67%
Independent	Jeanné Lewis	7,417	1.38%
Independent	Chander Jayaraman	7,365	1.37%
Independent	Claudia Barragán	5,607	1.05%
Independent	A'Shia Howard	5,329	0.99%
Libertarian	Joe Bishop-Henchman	5,173	0.96%
Independent	Will Merrifield	5,086	0.95%
Independent	Kathy Henderson	4,803	0.90%
Independent	Alexander M. Padro	3,780	0.70%
Independent	Calvin H. Gurley	3,203	0.60%
Independent	Michangelo Scruggs	2,874	0.54%
Independent	Keith Silver	2,605	0.49%
Independent	Mario Cristaldo	2,384	0.44%
Write-in		2,266	0.42%
Independent	Rick Murphree	1,851	0.35%
Independent	Eric M. Rogers	1,839	0.34%
Total votes		535,264	100.00%

== Ward 2 ==
2020 Council of the District of Columbia Ward 2 Election
- November 3, 2020
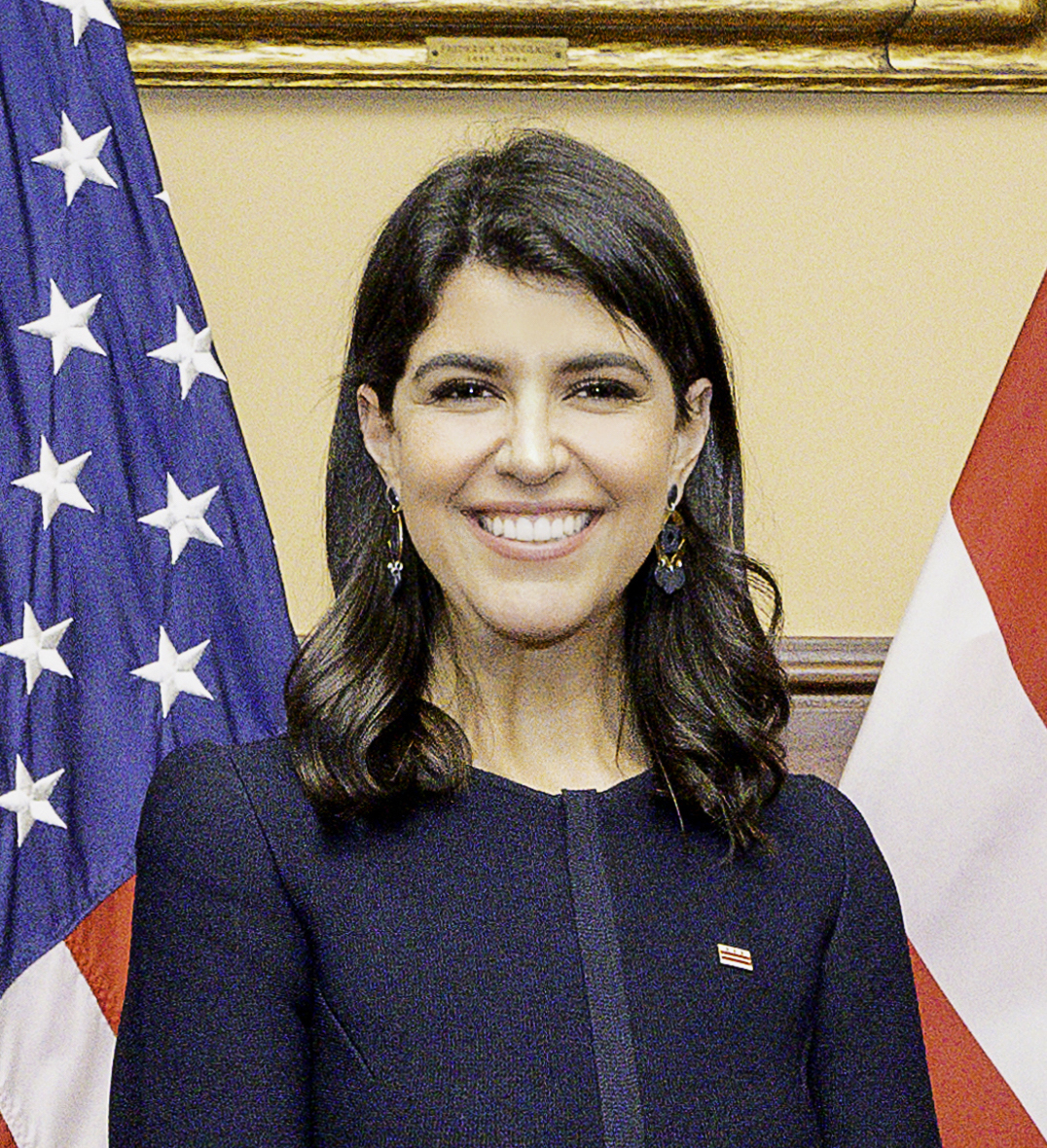

Nominee	Brooke Pinto	Randy Downs	Martín Miguel Fernandez
Party	Democratic	Independent	Independent
Popular vote	20,364	6,141	2,137
Percentage	68.30%	20.60%	7.17%
Councilmember before election
Brooke Pinto
Democratic
Elected Councilmember
Brooke Pinto
Democratic

A recall attempt had been made against Evans, but the District of Columbia Board of Elections ruled that the recall campaign couldn't collect signatures due to them not filing the proper campaign finance paperwork. Evans, the longest serving member of the city council since his first election in 1991, resigned on January 17, 2020, while under investigation for ethics violations and after all twelve other members voted unanimously to recommend his expulsion. His resignation caused a special election to be held. Evans announced that he would run in the special election on January 28, but later dropped out of the special election while remaining in the Democratic primary.

Pinto won in the special election and the Democratic nomination. She won in the general election against independent candidates Randy Downs and Martín Miguel Fernandez and Statehood Green nominee Peter Bolton.

=== Democratic primary ===
Candidates

- Jack Evans, former councilmember from Ward 2 (1991-2020)
- John Fanning, ANC commissioner from 2F
- Jordan Grossman, former legislative assistant to U.S. Senator Amy Klobuchar
- Daniel Hernandez, Marine Corps veteran
- Patrick Kennedy, ANC commissioner from 2A
- Brooke Pinto, former assistant attorney general of the District of Columbia
- Kishan Putta, ANC commissioner from 2E and at-large candidate for council in 2014
- Yilin Zhang, business executive

Endorsements

John Fanning

Labor unions

- International Brotherhood of Teamsters local 639

Local officials

- Carol Schwartz, former Republican At-large Councilmember
Jordan Grossman

Federal officials

- Amy Klobuchar, member of the United States Senate from Minnesota
- Henry Waxman, former member of the United States House of Representatives from California (1975-2015)

Labor unions

- Amalgamated Transit Union local 689
- AFL-CIO Metropolitan Washington Council
- Nonprofit Professional Employees Union
- SEIU locals 32BJ, 500, and 1199
- UNITE HERE local 25
- United Brotherhood of Carpenters and Joiners of America local 197
- United Food and Commercial Workers Local 400
- Washington Teachers Union

Local officials

- Elissa Silverman, At-Large member of the Council of the District of Columbia

Organizations

- DC for Democracy
- DC Working Families Party
- Jews United for Justice
- National Organization for Women
- Run for Something
- Sunrise Movement
Patrick Kennedy

Individuals

- Ruby Corado, foudner of LGBTQ social services center Casa Ruby

Labor unions

- International Association of Fire Fighters local 36

Local officials

- Anita Bonds, At-Large Member of the Council of the District of Columbia
- Phil Mendelson, Chair of the Council of the District of Columbia

Organizations

- Democrats for Education Reform
- Greater Greater Washington
- Sierra Club
Brooke Pinto

Federal officials

- Richard Blumenthal, member of the United States Senate from Connecticut
- Michael Donald Brown, Shadow Senator from Washington, D.C.
- Tom Daschle, former member of the United States Senate from South Dakota and Senate Majority Leader
- Joe Kennedy III, member of the United States House of Representatives from Massachusetts's 4th congressional district

Local officials

- Karl Racine, Attorney General for the District of Columbia

Publications

- The Washington Post
Kishan Putta

Federal officials

- Vivek Murthy, former Surgeon General of the United States (2015-2017 and 2021-2025)

2020 Council of the District of Columbia Ward 2 Democratic primary
Party	Candidate	Votes	%
Democratic	Brooke Pinto	3,142	28.38%
Democratic	Patrick Kennedy	2,763	24.96%
Democratic	Jordan Grossman	2,385	21.54%
Democratic	Kishan Putta	1,100	9.94%
Democratic	John Fanning	695	6.28%
Democratic	Yilin Zhang	473	4.27%
Democratic	Jack Evans	376	3.40%
Democratic	Daniel Hernandez	129	1.17%
Write-in		8	0.07%
Total votes		11,071	100.00%

=== Republican primary ===
Candidates

- Katherine Venice, CEO of venture capital firm Ethical Capitalism Group

2020 Council of the District of Columbia Ward 2 Republican primary
Party	Candidate	Votes	%
Republican	Katherine Venice	359	84.67%
Write-in		65	15.33%
Total votes		424	100.00%

=== Independents ===
- Randy Downs, activist
- Martín Miguel Fernandez

Endorsements

Randy Downs

Local officials

- Jack Jacobson, member of the District of Columbia State Board of Education from Ward 2

Organizations

- Greater Greater Washington

=== General Election ===
2020 Council of the District of Columbia Ward 2 election
Party	Candidate	Votes	%
Democratic	Brooke Pinto (incumbent)	20,364	68.30%
Independent	Randy Downs	6,141	20.60%
Independent	Martín Miguel Fernandez	2,137	7.17%
DC Statehood Green	Peter Bolton	873	2.93%
Write-in		302	1.01%
Total votes		29,817	100.00%

== Ward 4 ==
2020 Council of the District of Columbia Ward 4 Election
- November 3, 2020
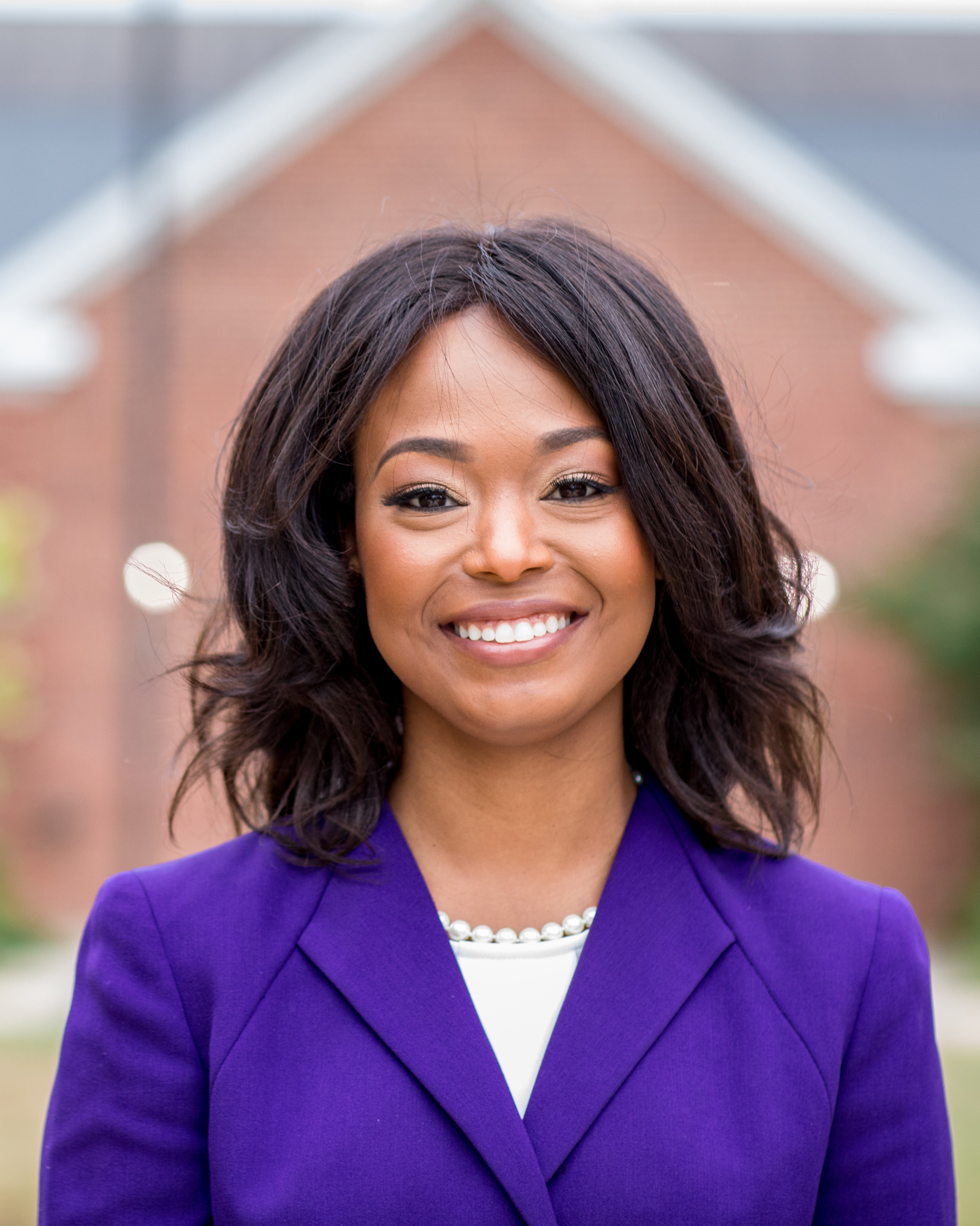

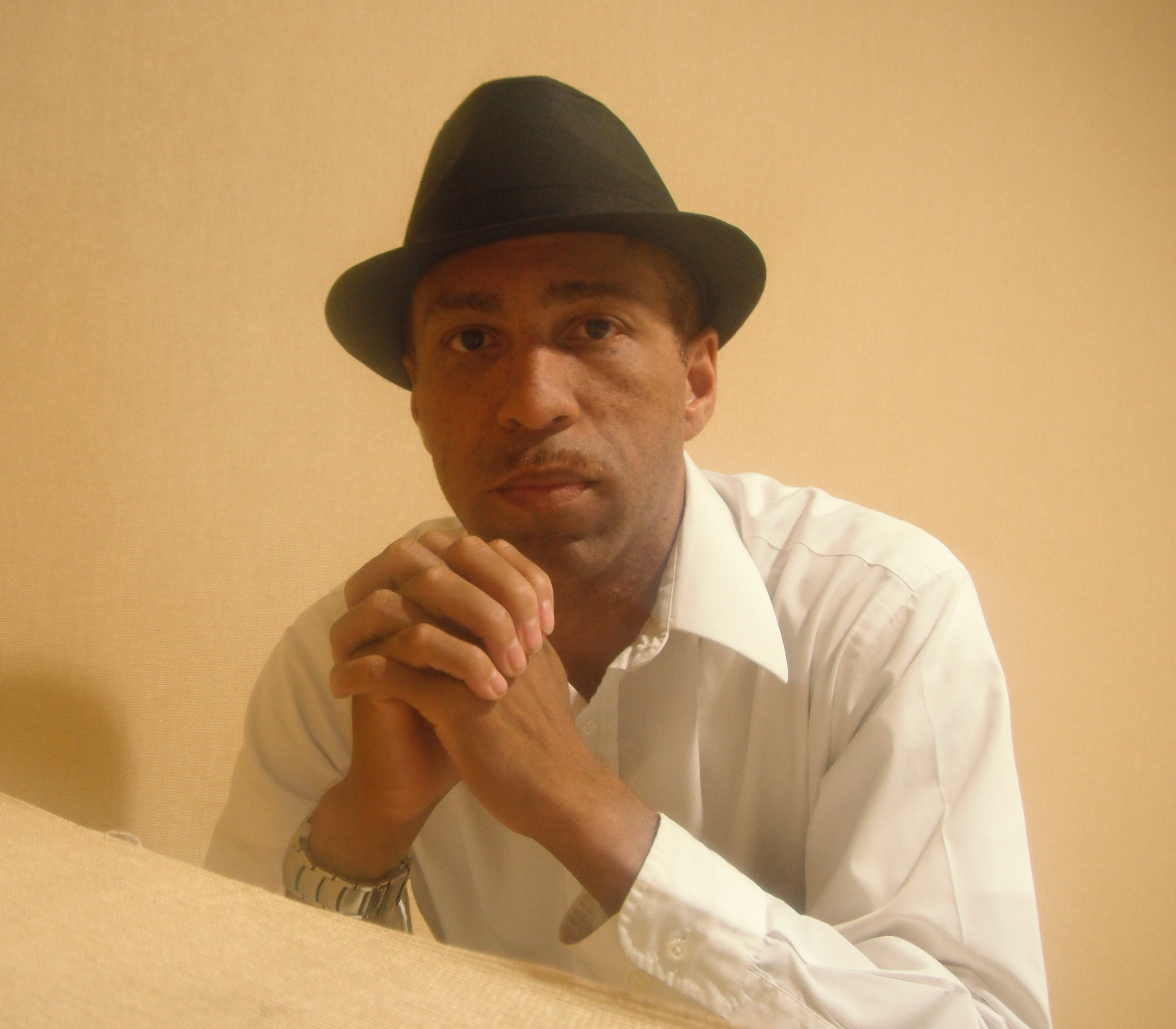
Nominee	Janeese Lewis George	Perry Redd
Party	Democratic	DC Statehood Green
Popular vote	38,990	2,434
Percentage	91.76%	5.73%
Councilmember before election
Brandon Todd
Democratic
Elected Councilmember
Janeese Lewis George
Democratic

Brandon Todd, who had served on the city council since 2015, was the first incumbent member of the council to file for reelection. Janeese Lewis George, the former assistant attorney general, announced that she would run for the Democratic nomination and focused her campaign on attacking Todd's connection with Mayor Browser. George defeated Todd in the Democratic primary and defeated Statehood Green nominee Perry Redd in the general election.

=== Democratic primary ===
Candidates

- Brandon Todd, incumbent (2015–present)
- Janeese Lewis George, former assistant attorney general

Endorsements

Janeese Lewis George

Labor unions

- Amalgamated Transit Union local 689
- AFL-CIO Metropolitan Washington Council
- Nonprofit Professional Employees Union
- SEIU locals 500, 1199
- UNITE HERE local 25
- United Food and Commercial Workers local 400
- Washington Teachers' Union

Local officials

- Frazier O’Leary, member of the District of Columbia State Board of Education from Ward 4
- Karl Racine, Attorney General for the District of Columbia
- Elissa Silverman, at-large member of the Council of the District of Columbia

Organizations

- Black Lives Matter DC
- Capital Stonewall Democrats
- DC Young Democrats
- Greater Greater Washington
- Jews United for Justice
- National Organization for Women
- Planned Parenthood
- Sierra Club
- Working Families Party
Brandon Todd

Labor unions

- American Federation of Government Employees local 1975
- American Federation of State, County and Municipal Employees district council 20
- International Brotherhood of Teamsters local 639

Local officials

- Anita Bonds, incumbent Democratic At-large Councilmember
- Kenyan McDuffie, incumbent Ward 5 Councilmember

Organizations

- Democrats for Education Reform
- District of Columbia Association of Realtors

Publications

- The Washington Post

2020 Council of the District of Columbia Ward 4 Democratic primary
Party	Candidate	Votes	%
Democratic	Janeese Lewis George	10,965	54.76%
Democratic	Brandon Todd (incumbent)	8,624	43.07%
Democratic	Marlena D. Edwards	411	2.05%
Write-in		24	0.12%
Total votes		19,613	100.00%

=== Statehood Green primary ===
Candidates

- Perry Redd, songwriter

2020 Council of the District of Columbia Ward 4 Statehood Green Party primary
Party	Candidate	Votes	%
DC Statehood Green	Perry Redd	44	51.76%
Write-in		41	48.24%
Total votes		85	100.00%

=== General election ===
2020 Council of the District of Columbia Ward 4 election
Party	Candidate	Votes	%
Democratic	Janeese Lewis George	38,990	91.76%
DC Statehood Green	Perry Redd	2,434	5.73%
Write-in		1,065	2.51%
Total votes		11,071	100.00%

== Ward 7 ==
2020 Council of the District of Columbia Ward 7 Election
- November 3, 2020
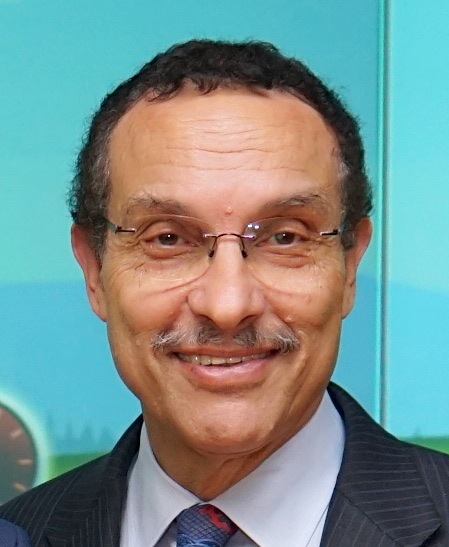

Nominee	Vincent Gray	Write-in
Party	Democratic	-
Popular vote	33,392	1,955
Percentage	94.47%	5.53%
Councilmember before election
Vincent Gray
Democratic
Elected Councilmember
Vincent Gray
Democratic

Incumbent Vincent Gray won in the Democratic primary and faced no opposition in the general election.

=== Democratic primary ===
Candidates

- Kelvin Brown, unsuccessful write-in candidate for neighborhood commissioner
- Vincent C. Gray, Mayor of the District of Columbia (2011–2015) and member of the Council of the District of Columbia from Ward 7 (2005–2007; 2017–2025)
- Anthony Lorenzo Green, neighborhood commissioner
- Veda Rasheed, neighborhood commissioner

Endorsements

Anthony Lorenzo Green

Labor unions

- Amalgamated Transit Union local 689
- AFL-CIO Metropolitan Washington Council
- Nonprofit Professional Employees Union
- SEIU local 1199
- Washington Teachers' Union

Organizations

- DC for Democracy
- Jews United for Justice
- Working Families Party
Vincent Gray

Labor unions

- International Brotherhood of Teamsters local 639
- SEIU local 32BJ

Organizations

- Capital Stonewall Democrats
- Democrats for Education Reform
- Greater Greater Washington
- Sierra Club

Publications

- The Washington Post

2020 Council of the District of Columbia Ward 7 Democratic primary
Party	Candidate	Votes	%
Democratic	Vincent C. Gray (incumbent)	5,254	45.43%
Democratic	Veda Rasheed	2,638	22.81%
Democratic	Kelvin Brown	2,024	17.50%
Democratic	Anthony Lorenzo Green	1,396	12.07%
Democratic	Rebecca J. Morris	183	1.58%
Democratic	James Leroy Jennings	36	0.31%
Write-in		34	0.29%
Total votes		11,565	100.00%

=== General election ===
2020 Council of the District of Columbia Ward 7 election
Party	Candidate	Votes	%
Democratic	Vincent C. Gray (incumbent)	33,392	94.47%
Write-in		1,955	5.53%
Total votes		35,347	100.00%

== Ward 8 ==
2020 Council of the District of Columbia Ward 8 Election
- November 3, 2020
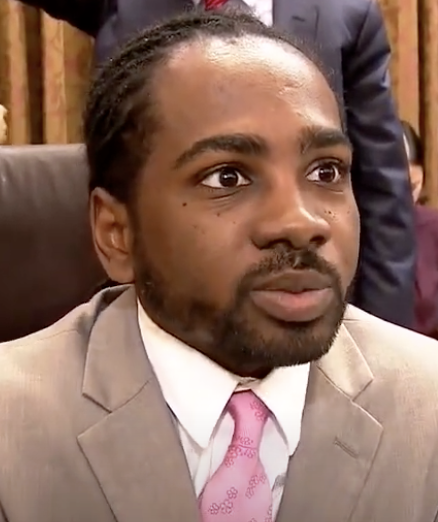

Nominee	Trayon White	Fred Hill	Christopher Cole
Party	Democratic	Independent	Independent
Popular vote	25,340	4,745	1,023
Percentage	78.84%	14.76%	3.18%
Councilmember before election
Trayon White
Democratic
Elected Councilmember
Trayon White
Democratic

Incumbent Trayon White won in the Democratic primary and in the general election.

=== Democratic Primary ===
Candidates

- Stuart Anderson, Trayon White's campaign manager
- Mike Austin, neighborhood commissioner
- Yaida Ford, lawyer and Council staffer
- Trayon White, member of the Council of the District of Columbia from Ward 8 (2017–present)

Endorsements

Mike Austin

Organizations

- Greater Greater Washington (co-endorsement with Trayon White)

Publications

- The Washington Post
Yaida Ford

Organizations

- National Organization for Women
Trayon White

Labor unions

- Amalgamated Transit Union local 689
- American Federation of Government Employees local 1975
- AFL-CIO Metropolitan Washington Council
- SEIU local 1199
- United Food and Commercial Workers local 400
- Washington Teachers' Union

Organizations

- Capital Stonewall Democrats
- Greater Greater Washington (co-endorsement with Mike Austin)
- Sierra Club

2020 Council of the District of Columbia Ward 8 Democratic primary
Party	Candidate	Votes	%
Democratic	Trayon White (incumbent)	5,063	58.22%
Democratic	Mike Austin	2,376	27.32%
Democratic	Yaida Ford	656	7.54%
Democratic	Stuart Anderson	405	4.66%
Write-in		197	2.27%
Total votes		8,697	100.00%

=== Republican Primary ===
Candidates

- Nate Derenge

2020 Council of the District of Columbia Ward 8 Republican primary
Party	Candidate	Votes	%
Republican	Nate Derenge	43	60.56%
Write-in		28	39.44%
Total votes		71	100.00%

=== Independents ===
Candidates

- Fred Hill
- Christopher Cole

=== General election ===
2020 Council of the District of Columbia Ward 8 election
Party	Candidate	Votes	%
Democratic	Trayon White (incumbent)	25,340	78.84%
Independent	Fred Hill	4,745	14.76%
Independent	Christopher Cole	1,023	3.18%
Republican	Nate Derenge	717	2.23%
Write-in		316	0.98%
Total votes		32,141	100.00%

== Campaign finance ==
This was the first city council election to have public campaign financing and during the campaign $3.4 million was given to candidates. Fifty-six candidates attempted to receive public campaign financing and thirty-six qualified for the financing. Seven candidates who received public campaign financing won their elections including George who received the most at $281,055 during the campaign.

Candidate	Campaign committee				
Candidate	Raised	Spent	COH	L&D	District
Claudia Barragán	$5,134.05	$4,727.23	$0.00	$0.00	At-large district
Nate Derenge	$0.00	$0.00	$0.00	$0.00	8th district
Yaida Ford	$69,445.97	$79,696.95	$0.00	$55,077.45	4th district
Marcus Goodwin	$411,582.39	$382,690.52	$0.00	$0.00	At-large district
Calvin H. Gurley	$1,479.00	$1,449.89	$0.00	$0.00	At-large district
Vincent C. Gray	$210,406.47	$201,515.74	$0.00	$0.00	7th district
Kathy Henderson	$3,130.00	$1,953.37	$0.00	$0.00	At-large district
Rick Murphree	$103,767.65	$44,355.52	$0.00	$32,039.44	At-large district
Alex Padro	$50,190.00	$48,180.79	$0.00	$3,461.34	At-large district
Marya Pickering	$30,073.91	$30,073.91	$0.00	$0.00	At-large district
Brooke Pinto	$210,927.40	$197,785.97	$0.00	$25,000.00	2nd district
Perry Redd	$400.00	$40.00	$0.00	$0.00	4th district
Eric M. Rogers	$1,241.88	$2,588.88	$0.00	$0.00	At-large district
Brandon Todd	$499,570.99	$497,618.61	$0.00	$0.00	4th district
Robert White	$417,189.43	$401,057.36	$0.00	$0.00	At-large district
