= 2024 Council of the District of Columbia election =

US Election

- November 5, 2024

6 of the 13 seats on the Council of the District of Columbia 7 seats needed for a majority
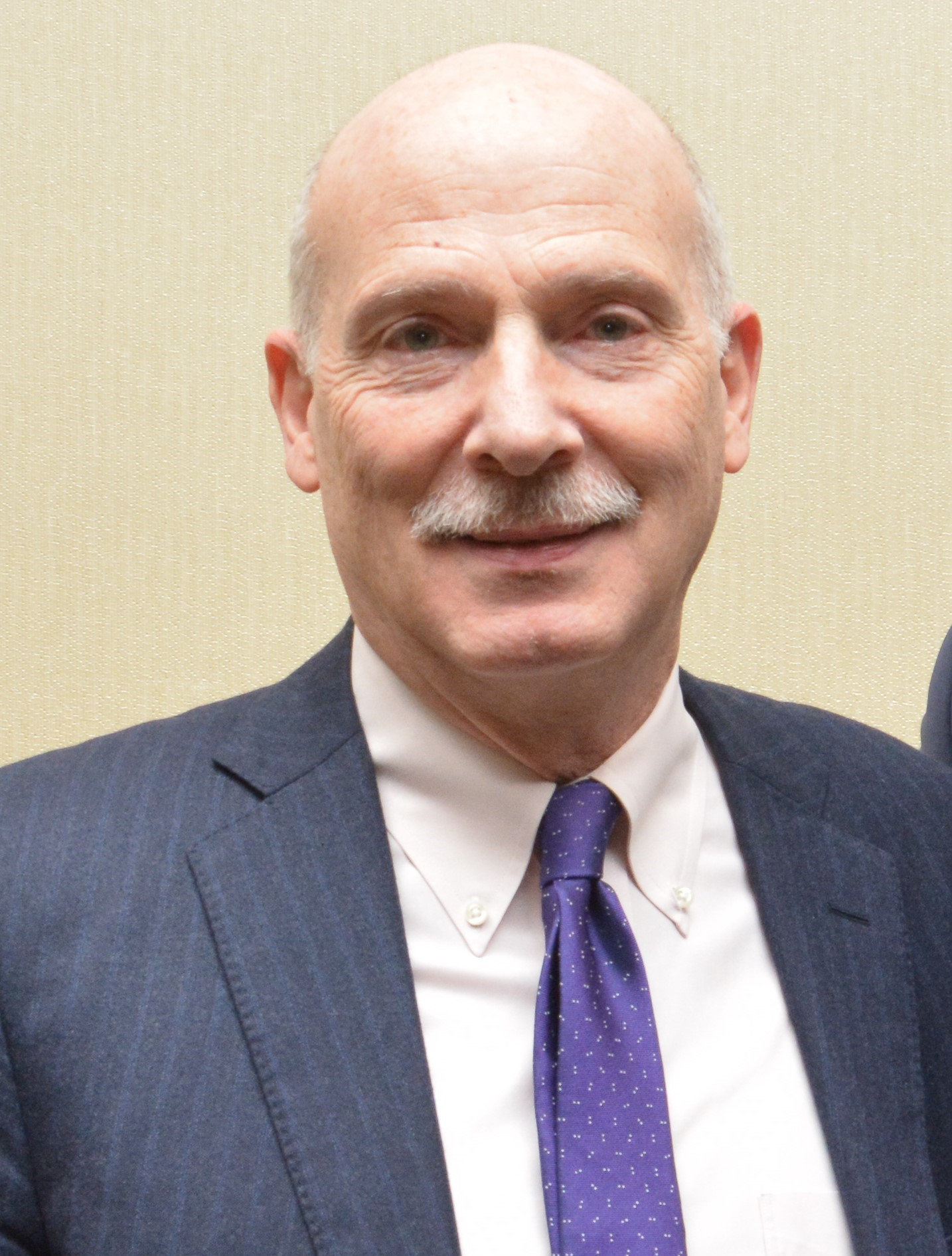

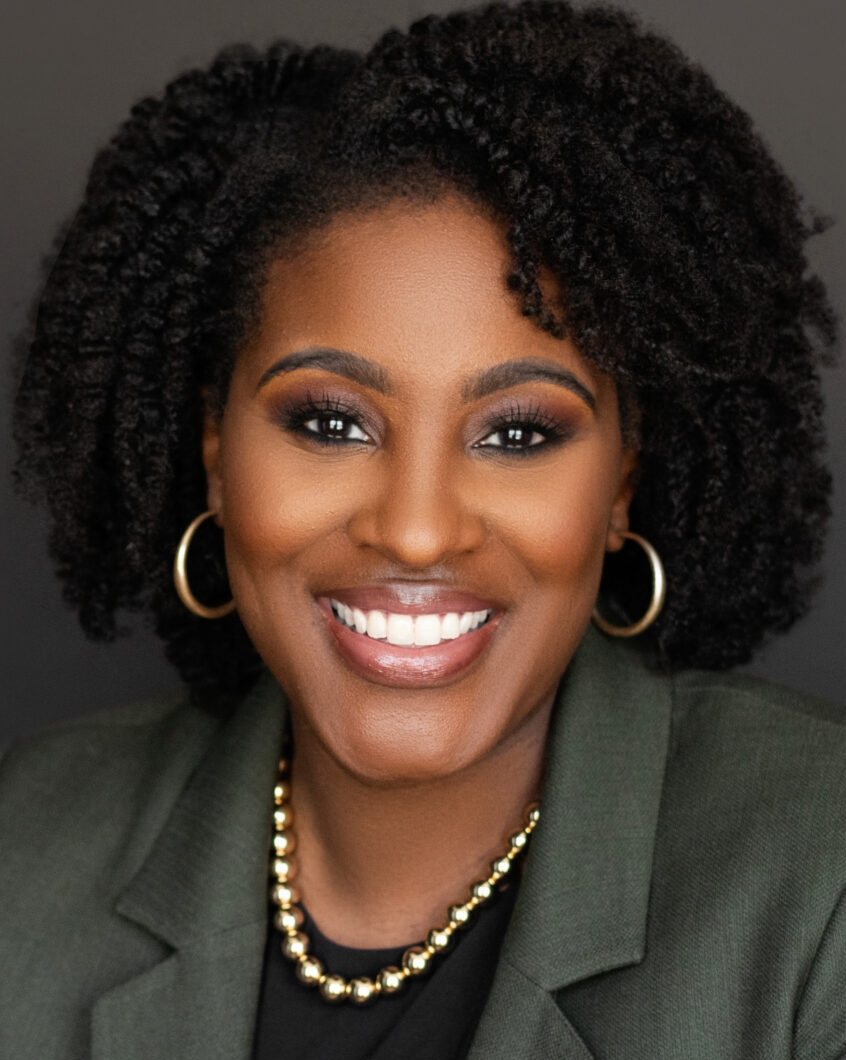
	Majority party	Minority party
Leader	Phil Mendelson	Christina Henderson
Party	Democratic	Independent
Seats before	11	2
Seats after	11	2
Seat change	Steady	Steady
Popular vote	362,730	90,814
Percentage	69.32%	17.35%

The 2024 general election for the Council of the District of Columbia was held on November 5, with primary elections taking place on June 4, 2024. Elections were held for the seats of four out of the eight wards and two of the four at-large seats. The Democratic Party retained its control of the city council, with only one new member elected to the council out of the six total seats.

== Background ==
Muriel Bowser won election to a third term in the 2022 election becoming the first mayor to win a third term in the city's history. The District of Columbia Home Rule Act states that "not more than two of the at-large members shall be nominated by the same political party" which results in the Democratic Party being unable to run in all at-large districts. David Catania, a member of the city council from 1997 to 2015, was the last member of the Republican Party elected to the council, but changed his political affiliation to independent in 2004.

This will be the first election that will allow for non-citizens to vote for DC council members after a law enacted in early 2023. While non-citizens are explicitly forbidden from participating in federal elections such as for U.S. President and the U.S. House of Representatives, some municipalities allow them to vote in local elections. As of April 30, 2024, only 372 non-citizens were registered to vote, representing less than 0.1% of all registered voters in the District.

== Summary ==
Position	Incumbent				Certified candidates ▌Democratic ▌Statehood–Green ▌Independent ▌Republican
Position	Member	Party	First elected	Status	Certified candidates ▌Democratic ▌Statehood–Green ▌Independent ▌Republican
At-Large	Christina Henderson	Independent	2020	Incumbent re-elected.	▌ ✓ Robert White 62.2%; ▌ ✓ Christina Henderson 23.2%; ▌Darryl Moch 7.6%; ▌Rob Simmons 6.3%
At-Large	Robert White	Democratic	2016	Incumbent re-elected.	▌ ✓ Robert White 62.2%; ▌ ✓ Christina Henderson 23.2%; ▌Darryl Moch 7.6%; ▌Rob Simmons 6.3%
Ward 2	Brooke Pinto	Democratic	2020	Incumbent re-elected.	▌ ✓ Brooke Pinto 93.4%
Ward 4	Janeese Lewis George	Democratic	2020	Incumbent re-elected.	▌ ✓ Janeese Lewis George 96.6%
Ward 7	Vincent C. Gray	Democratic	2016	Incumbent retired. New councilmember elected. Democratic hold.	▌ ✓ Wendell Felder 92.8%; ▌Noah Montgomery 6.0%
Ward 8	Trayon White	Democratic	2016	Incumbent re-elected.	▌ ✓ Trayon White 75.8%; ▌Nate Derenge 14.8%

== At-large ==
2024 District of Columbia At-large Councilor Election
- November 5, 2024
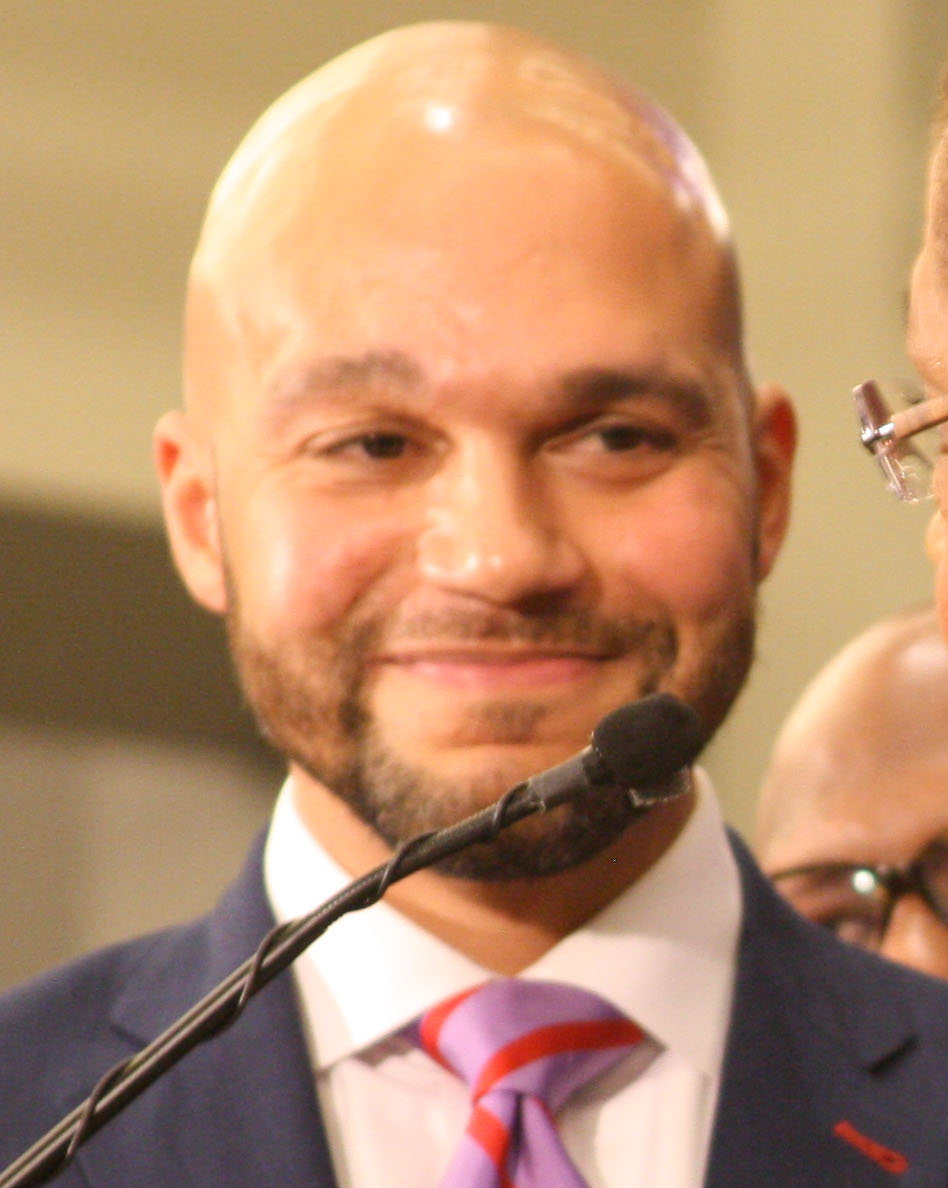

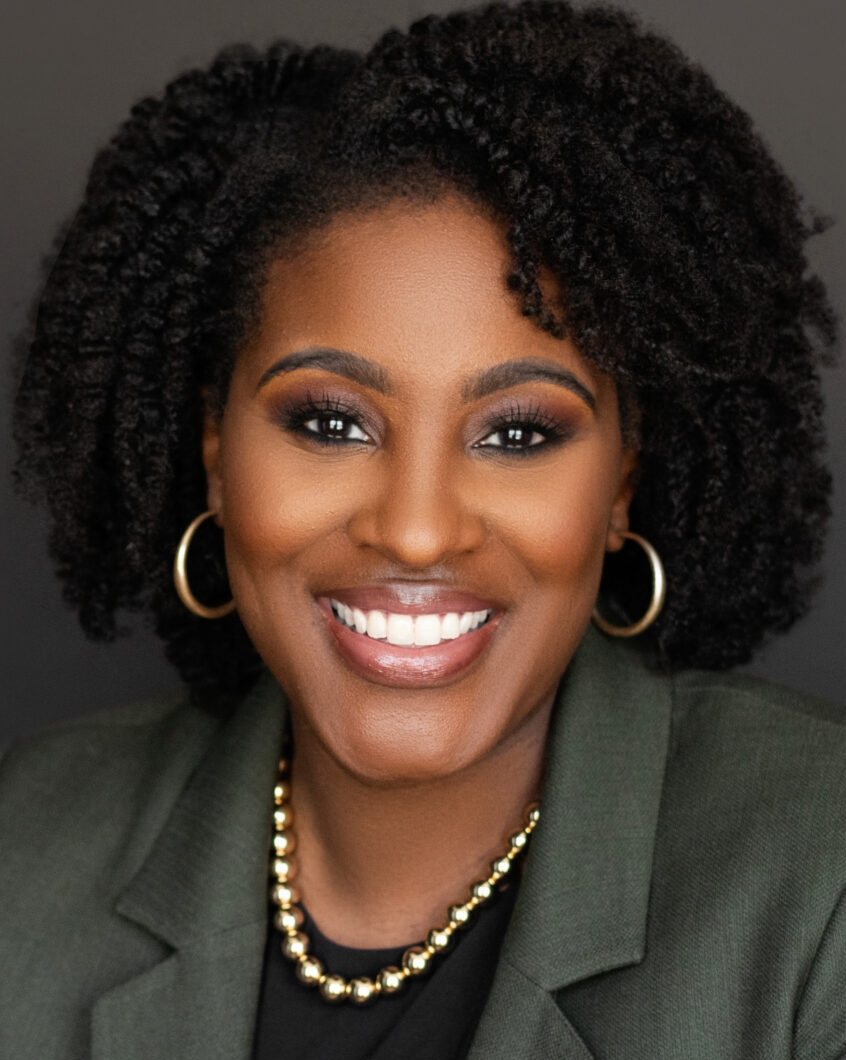

Nominee	Robert White	Christina Henderson
Party	Democratic	Independent
Popular vote	243,528	90,814
Percentage	62.18%	23.19%
Nominee	Darryl Moch	Rob Simmons
Party	DC Statehood Green	Republican
Popular vote	29,789	24,760
Percentage	7.61%	6.32%
- Ward results White: 50–60% 60–70% 70–80%
Councilmembers before election
Robert White (Dem.)
Christina Henderson (Ind.)
Elected Councilmembers
Robert White (Dem.)
Christina Henderson (Ind.)

Democratic nominee and incumbent Robert White and Independent and former staffer to U.S. Senate and city council staffer Christina Henderson advanced in the general election over dozens of other candidates. Now both incumbents, the two are running for reelection.

=== Democratic primary ===
Candidates

- Rodney "Red" Grant, businessman, comedian, and Independent candidate for Mayor in 2022
- Robert White, incumbent councilor

Endorsements

Robert White

Labor unions

- Amalgamated Transit Union local 689
- AFL-CIO Metropolitan Washington Council
- Mid-Atlantic Pipe Trades Association

Organizations

- Capital Stonewall Democrats
- DC Latino Caucus
- Greater Greater Washington
- National Organization for Women
- Planned Parenthood Action
- Sierra Club
- Washington Teachers' Union

Publications

- The Washington Post
Rodney "Red" Grant

Labor unions

- American Federation of Government Employees Locals 2725 & 2978

2024 Council of the District of Columbia At-large Democratic primary
Party	Candidate	Votes	%
Democratic	Robert White	54,636	81.50
Democratic	Rodney "Red" Grant	11,767	17.55
Write-in		639	0.95
Total votes		67,042	100.0

=== Statehood Green primary ===
Candidates

- Darryl Moch

2024 Council of the District of Columbia At-large Statehood Green primary
Party	Candidate	Votes	%
DC Statehood Green	Darryl Moch	319	80.35
Write-in		78	19.65
Total votes		397	100.0

=== Independents ===
Candidates

- Patricia Eguino, ANC Commissioner for 6C06 and scientist
- Christina Henderson, incumbent councilor
- Kevin Rapp, ANC Commissioner from 5E05 and businessman

Endorsements

Christina Henderson

Labor unions

- Amalgamated Transit Union local 689
- AFL-CIO Metropolitan Washington Council
- International Association of Fire Fighters local 36
- LiUNA Metropolitan Area of Philadelphia/Baltimore/Washington Laborers District Council
- Mid-Atlantic Pipe Trades Association

Organizations

- Capital Stonewall Democrats
- Greater Greater Washington
- National Organization for Women
- Sierra Club

=== General election ===
2024 Council of the District of Columbia At-large election
Party	Candidate	Votes	%
Democratic	Robert White (inc.)	243,528	62.18%
Independent	Christina Henderson (inc.)	90,814	23.19%
DC Statehood Green	Darryl Moch	29,789	7.61%
Republican	Rob Simmons	24,760	6.32%
Write-in		2,746	0.70
Total votes		391,637	100.0

== Ward 2 ==
2024 District of Columbia Ward 2 Election
- November 5, 2024
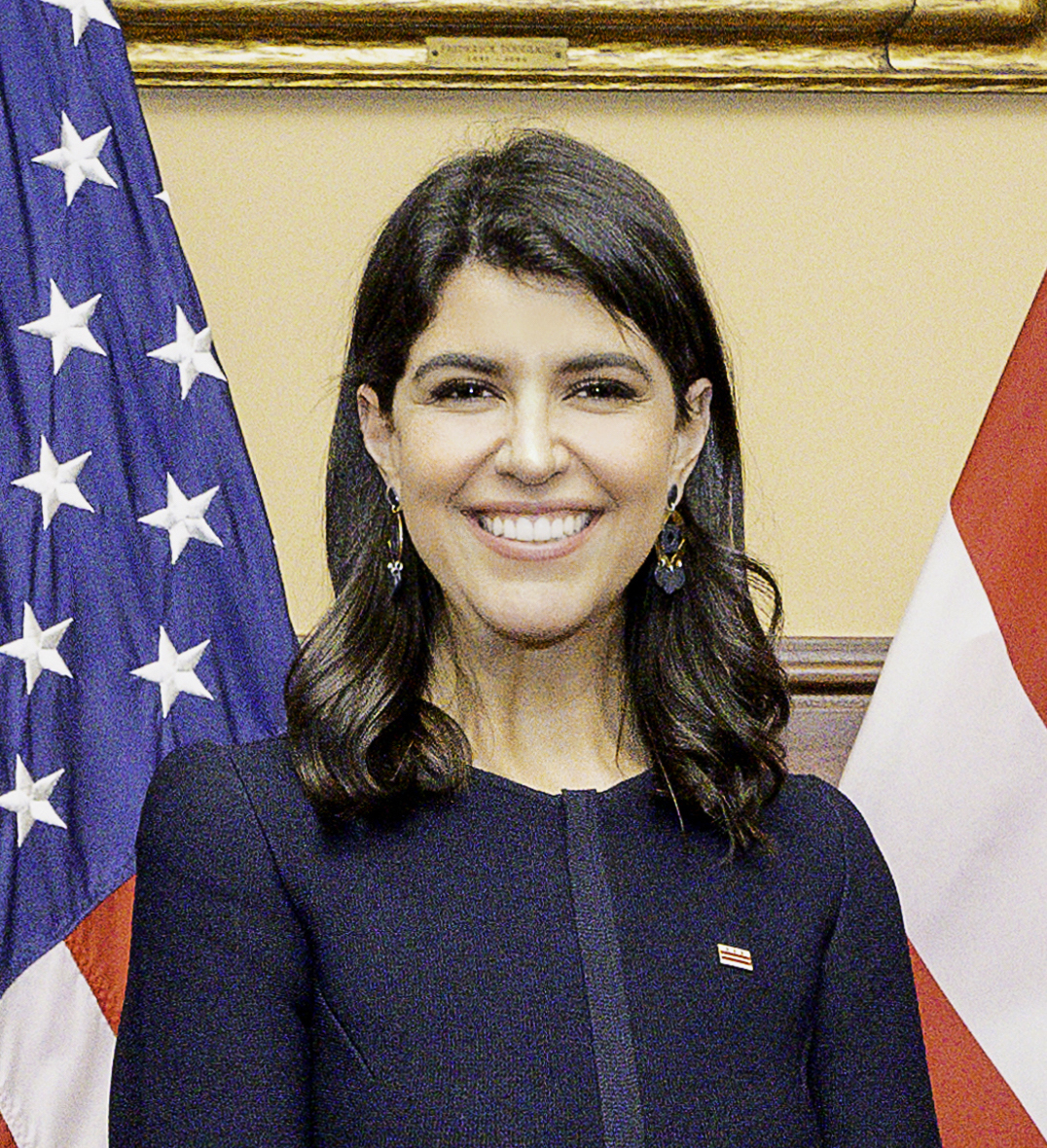
Nominee	Brooke Pinto
Party	Democratic
Popular vote	29,839
Percentage	93.38%
Councilmember before election
Brooke Pinto
Democratic
Elected Councilmember
Brooke Pinto
Democratic

Incumbent Brooke Pinto won election in a June 2020 special contest, and subsequently in that year's general election to fill the seat of Jack Evans, who resigned amid a conflict of interest scandal.

Pinto, a 28-year old lawyer, came under scrutiny during the election season after finance reports showed her father, a venture capitalist from Connecticut, donated large sums of money to her campaign bank account. In addition, she did not participate in the city's Fair Elections program which enabled her to partially self-fund her campaign. Pinto had the most out-of-state donors out of any candidate in the race. Regardless, Pinto won the election and became the council's youngest member in its history. She announced her re-election bid in June.

Pinto chairs the Committee on the Judiciary and Public Safety.

=== Democratic primary ===
Candidates

- Brooke Pinto, incumbent councilor

Declined

- Jack Evans, former Ward 2 councilor

Endorsements

Brooke Pinto

Labor unions

- Amalgamated Transit Union local 689
- Mid-Atlantic Pipe Trades Association

Organizations

- Capital Stonewall Democrats
- National Organization for Women
- Planned Parenthood Action
- Sierra Club

Publications

- The Washington Post

2024 Council of the District of Columbia Ward 2 Democratic primary
Party	Candidate	Votes	%
Democratic	Brooke Pinto (inc.)	5,845	92.72
Write-in		459	7.28
Total votes		6,304	100.0

=== General election ===
2024 Council of the District of Columbia Ward 2 general election
Party	Candidate	Votes	%
Democratic	Brooke Pinto (inc.)	29,839	93.38%
Write-in		2,116	6.62%
Total votes		31,955	100.0

== Ward 4 ==
2024 Council of the District of Columbia Ward 4 election
- November 5, 2024
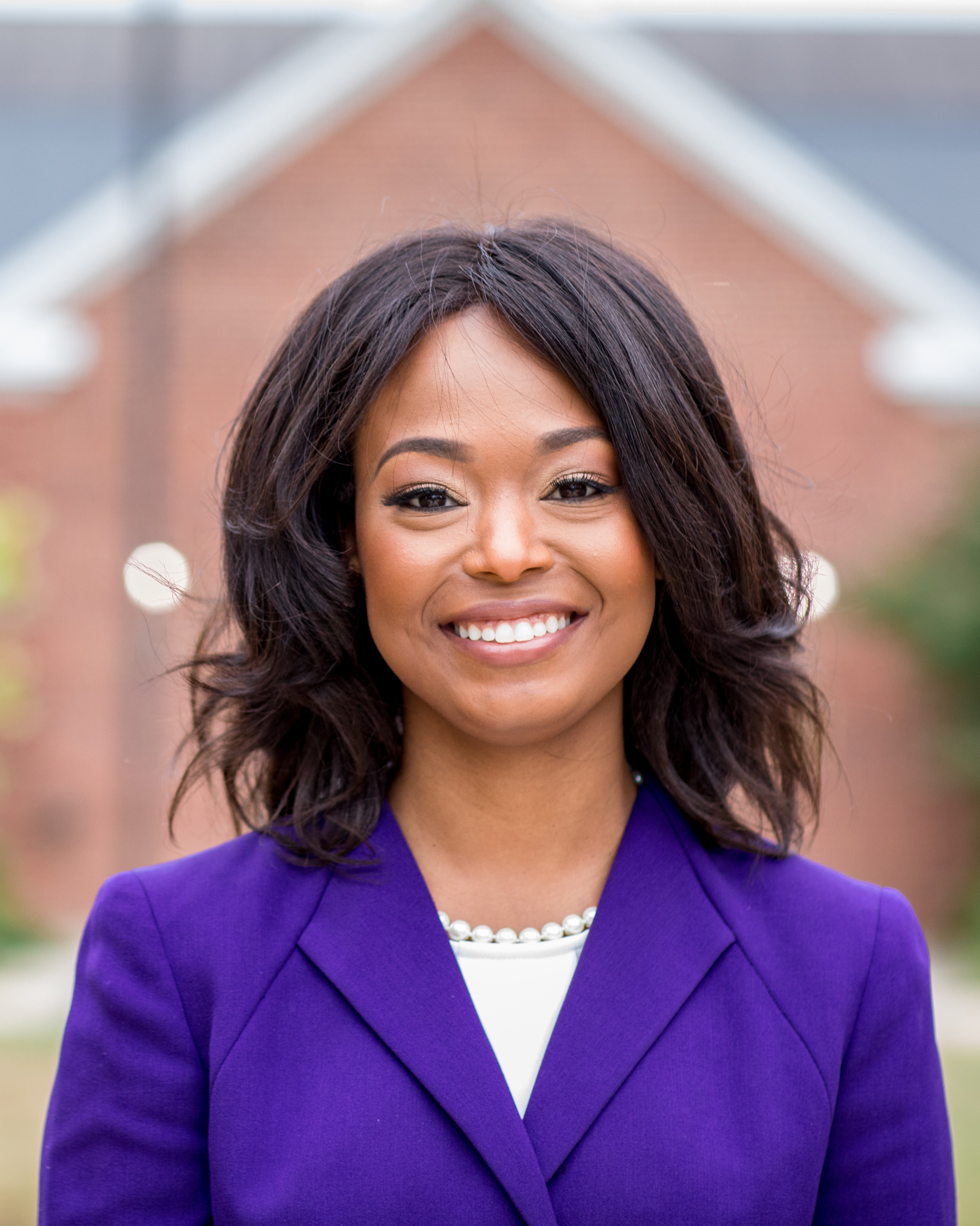
Nominee	Janeese Lewis George
Party	Democratic
Popular vote	36,319
Percentage	96.64%
Councilmember before election
Janeese Lewis George
Democratic
Elected Councilmember
Janeese Lewis George
Democratic

Janeese Lewis George, an attorney who had worked for then-Attorney General Karl Racine and the District of Columbia State Board of Education, won in the Democratic primary over moderate incumbent Brandon Todd in what was considered a major upset. A self-described Democratic socialist, George has drawn criticism for her support to defund the Metropolitan Police Department, the city's law enforcement division.

=== Democratic primary ===
Candidates

- Lisa Gore, ANC Commissioner from 4G01 and candidate for At-Large in 2022
- Janeese Lewis George, incumbent councilor
- Paul Johnson, former ANC Commissioner from 4C07

Endorsements

Janeese Lewis George

Labor unions

- Amalgamated Transit Union local 689
- AFL-CIO Metropolitan Washington Council
- International Union of Painters and Allied Trades local 51
- LiUNA Metropolitan Area of Philadelphia/Baltimore/Washington Laborers’ District Council
- Mid-Atlantic Pipe Trades Association
- UNITE HERE local 25

Organizations

- Capital Stonewall Democrats
- DC for Democracy
- DC Latino Caucus
- Greater Greater Washington
- Jews United for Justice
- Metro DC Democratic Socialists of America
- National Organization for Women
- Sierra Club
Lisa Gore

Publications

- The Washington Post

2024 Council of the District of Columbia Ward 4 Democratic primary
Party	Candidate	Votes	%
Democratic	Janeese Lewis George (inc.)	8,085	66.19
Democratic	Lisa Gore	3,431	28.09
Democratic	Paul Johnson	653	5.35
Write-in		45	0.37
Total votes		12,214	100.0

=== General election ===
2024 Council of the District of Columbia Ward 4 general election
Party	Candidate	Votes	%
Democratic	Janeese Lewis George (inc.)	36,319	96.64%
Write-in		1,262	3.36%
Total votes		37,581	100.0

== Ward 7 ==
2024 District of Columbia Ward 7 Election
- November 5, 2024

Nominee	Wendell Felder	Noah Montgomery
Party	Democratic	Republican
Popular vote	32,673	2,105
Percentage	92.78%	5.98%
Councilmember before election
Vince Gray
Democratic
Elected Councilmember
Wendell Felder
Democratic

Incumbent Vince Gray has long been a fixture of local politics, serving respectively as the city's mayor, council chair, and as Ward 7's councilor on separated terms. Gray only attends council meetings through video calls. Some of his constituents have expressed their concern and wish for Gray to step away gracefully from the political scene. In December 2023, Gray announced he would be stepping aside from council activities once his term concluded in January 2025.

=== Democratic primary ===
Candidates

- Ebbon Allen, former ANC Commissioner for 7E03
- Kelvin Brown, Chair of ANC 7B, executive at Fannie Mae, and U.S. Army veteran
- Wendell Felder, Chair of ANC7D and President of the Ward 7 Democrats
- Nate Fleming, former Shadow congressperson, staffer for Councilor Trayon White, and candidate for the At-large council seat in 2022
- Roscoe Grant Jr., former ANC Commissioner and union president
- Villareal "VJ" Johnson II, former ANC Commissioner and city council aide
- Ebony Payne, ANC Commissioner from 7D05
- Veda Rasheed, former ANC Commissioner for 7E01 and attorney
- Denise Reed, former chief of staff to former councilor Kevin P. Chavous
- Eboni-Rose Thompson, President of the District of Columbia State Board of Education

Endorsements

Wendell Felder

Labor unions

- AFL-CIO Metropolitan Washington Council
- Service Employees International Union local 32BJ
- International Brotherhood of Teamsters local 639

Local officials

- Vincent Gray, retiring Ward 7 Councilmember
- Zachary Parker, incumbent Ward 5 Councilmember
- Brooke Pinto, incumbent Ward 2 Councilmember
- Anthony Williams, former Mayor of the District of Columbia (1999-2007)
- Trayon White, incumbent Ward 8 Councilmember

Labor unions

- Mid-Atlantic Pipe Trades Association

Organizations

- Capital Stonewall Democrats

Publications

- The Washington Post
Ebony Payne

Federal officials

- Lou Correa, member of the United States House of Representatives from California's 46th district
- Henry Cuellar, member of the United States House of Representatives from Texas's 28th district
- Ruben Gallego, member of the United States Senate from Arizona
- Darren Soto, member of the United States House of Representatives from Florida's 9th district
Veda Rasheed

Organizations

- Democrats for Education Reform
Eboni-Rose Thompson

Labor unions

- International Association of Fire Fighters local 36
- Washington Teachers' Union

Local officials

- Christina Henderson, incumbent At-large Councilmember

Organizations

- Greater Greater Washington
- Jews United for Justice
- National Organization for Women

2024 Council of the District of Columbia Ward 7 Democratic primary
Party	Candidate	Votes	%
Democratic	Wendell Felder	2,211	22.90
Democratic	Ebony Payne	1,938	20.07
Democratic	Eboni-Rose Thompson	1,869	19.36
Democratic	Veda Rasheed	979	10.14
Democratic	Kelvin Brown	966	10.01
Democratic	Nate Fleming	842	8.72
Democratic	Roscoe Grant Jr.	236	2.44
Democratic	Denise Reed	211	2.19
Democratic	Vallareal VJ Johnson II	208	2.15
Democratic	Ebbon A. Allen	163	1.69
Write-in		32	0.33
Total votes		9,655	100.0

=== Republican primary ===
No Republican candidate made the primary ballot for Ward 7. Noah Montgomery filed as a write-in candidate and won the nomination with a single vote.

=== General election ===
2024 Council of the District of Columbia Ward 7 general election
Party	Candidate	Votes	%
Democratic	Wendell Felder	32,673	92.78%
Republican	Noah Montgomery	2,105	5.98%
Write-in		438	1.24%
Total votes		35,216	100.0

== Ward 8 ==
2024 District of Columbia Ward 8 Election
- November 5, 2024
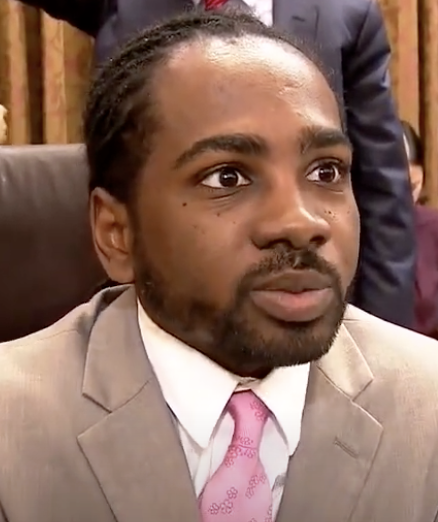

Nominee	Trayon White	Nate Derenge
Party	Democratic	Republican
Popular vote	20,371	3,981
Percentage	75.84%	14.82%
Councilmember before election
Trayon White
Democratic
Elected Councilmember
Trayon White
Democratic

Incumbent Trayon White charted a campaign for mayor in 2022, though finished third in the primary with just about 9% of the primary vote. White even lost his own constituency, Ward 8, to incumbent Muriel Bowser.

White announced his reelection bid during a radio interview with WAMU in September 2023. He won his primary in June 2024, but was arrested on federal bribery charges in August.

=== Democratic primary ===
Candidates

- Salim Adofo, Chair of ANC 8C
- Markus Batchelor, former vice president of the District of Columbia State Board of Education
- Rahman Branch, former executive director of the D.C. Office on African American Affairs and principal of Ballou High School
- Kevin Cannaday, program development director at the Urban Institute
- Trayon White, incumbent councilor

Endorsements

Salim Adofo

Organizations

- DC Latino Caucus
- Greater Greater Washington
Rahman Branch

Organizations

- National Organization for Women

Publications

- The Washington Post
Trayon White

Labor unions

- Washington Teachers' Union

2024 Council of the District of Columbia Ward 8 Democratic primary
Party	Candidate	Votes	%
Democratic	Trayon White (inc.)	3,115	52.98
Democratic	Salim Adofo	1,600	27.21
Democratic	Rahman Branch	1,129	19.20
Write-in		36	0.61
Total votes		5,880	100.0

=== Republican primary ===
Candidates

- Nate Derenge

2024 Council of the District of Columbia Ward 8 Republican primary
Party	Candidate	Votes	%
Republican	Nate Derenge	98	80.99
Write-in		23	19.01
Total votes		121	100.0

=== General election ===
2024 Council of the District of Columbia Ward 8 general election
Party	Candidate	Votes	%
Democratic	Trayon White (inc.)	20,371	75.84%
Republican	Nate Derenge	3,981	14.82%
Write-in		2,509	9.34%
Total votes		26,861	100.0
