= 2024 District of Columbia elections =

- Turnout: 70.8%

On November 5, 2024, the District of Columbia held elections for several local and federal government offices. Its primary elections were held on June 4, 2024.

In addition to the U.S. presidential race voters elected one of its two shadow senators, its nonvoting member of the House of Representatives, its Shadow congressperson to the House of Representatives, and 5 of 13 seats on the council.

There is also one ballot measure which was voted on.

== Federal elections ==
=== President of the United States ===
Washington, D.C., has 3 electoral votes in the Electoral College. The district has leaned heavily Democratic in each presidential election since 1964, the first one in which its population was able to vote.

2024 United States presidential election in the District of Columbia
Party	Candidate	Votes	%	±%
Democratic	Kamala Harris; Tim Walz	294,185	90.28	−1.87
Republican	Donald Trump; JD Vance	21,076	6.47	+1.07
Independent	Robert F. Kennedy Jr. (withdrawn); Nicole Shanahan (withdrawn)	2,778	0.85	N/A
Write-in		7,830	2.40	+1.49
Total votes		325,869	100	N/A

=== United States House of Representatives ===
Eleanor Holmes Norton ran for re-election as a non-voting delegate to the House of Representatives.

2024 United States House of Representatives election in District of Columbia
Party	Candidate	Votes	%	±%
Democratic	Eleanor Holmes Norton (incumbent)	251,540	80.09	−6.45
DC Statehood Green	Kymone Freeman	21,873	6.96	+2.06
Republican	Myrtle Patricia Alexander	19,765	6.29	+0.48
Independent	Michael A. Brown	19,033	6.06	N/A
Write-in		1,858	0.59	-0.17
Total votes		314,069	100.00	
Democratic hold				

=== Shadow Senator ===
2024 United States Shadow Senator election in the District of Columbia
Party	Candidate	Votes	%
Democratic	Ankit Jain	261,075	90.7%
Republican	Nelson Rimensnyder	26,615	9.3%
Write-in			
Total votes		287,690	100.0%
Democratic hold			

=== Shadow Representative ===
2024 United States Shadow Senator election in the District of Columbia
Party	Candidate	Votes	%
Democratic	Oye Owolewa	267,661	90.75
Republican	Ciprian Ivanof	25,040	8.49
Write-in		2,253	0.76
Total votes		294,954	100.0%
Democratic hold			

== District elections ==
=== Council ===
Longtime figure Vincent Gray, then the councilmember from ward 7, resigned from politics due to age and health issues and was replaced by Wendell Felder. All other elegible members ran for reelection and retained their seats on the Council.

Position	Incumbent				Certified candidates ▌Democratic ▌Statehood–Green ▌Independent ▌Republican
Position	Member	Party	First elected	Status	Certified candidates ▌Democratic ▌Statehood–Green ▌Independent ▌Republican
At-Large	Christina Henderson	Independent	2020	Incumbent re-elected.	▌ ✓ Robert White 62.2%; ▌ ✓ Christina Henderson 23.2%; ▌Darryl Moch 7.6%; ▌Rob Simmons 6.3%
At-Large	Robert White	Democratic	2016	Incumbent re-elected.	▌ ✓ Robert White 62.2%; ▌ ✓ Christina Henderson 23.2%; ▌Darryl Moch 7.6%; ▌Rob Simmons 6.3%
Ward 2	Brooke Pinto	Democratic	2020	Incumbent re-elected.	▌ ✓ Brooke Pinto 93.4%
Ward 4	Janeese Lewis George	Democratic	2020	Incumbent re-elected.	▌ ✓ Janeese Lewis George 96.6%
Ward 7	Vincent C. Gray	Democratic	2016	Incumbent retiring. New councilor elected. Democratic hold.	▌ ✓ Wendell Felder 92.8%; ▌Noah Montgomery 6.0%
Ward 8	Trayon White	Democratic	2016	Incumbent re-elected.	▌ ✓ Trayon White 75.8%; ▌Nate Derenge 14.8%

=== Ballot measure ===
Initiative 83, titled Ranked Choice Voting and Open the Primary Elections to Independent Voters Act of 2024, aims to permit ranked-choice voting and open the primary elections to independent voters. It allows voters registered as “unaffiliated” to participate in primaries, which were closed to these voters prior to the passage of the initiative.

==== Result ====
Initiative 83
Choice	Votes	%
For	212,332	72.89
Against	78,961	27.11
Total	291,293	100.00
Valid votes	291,293	89.33
Invalid/blank votes	34,788	10.67
Total votes	326,081	100.00
Registered voters/turnout	326,129	99.99
Source: District of Columbia Board of Elections
