= Perry Redd =

American songwriter

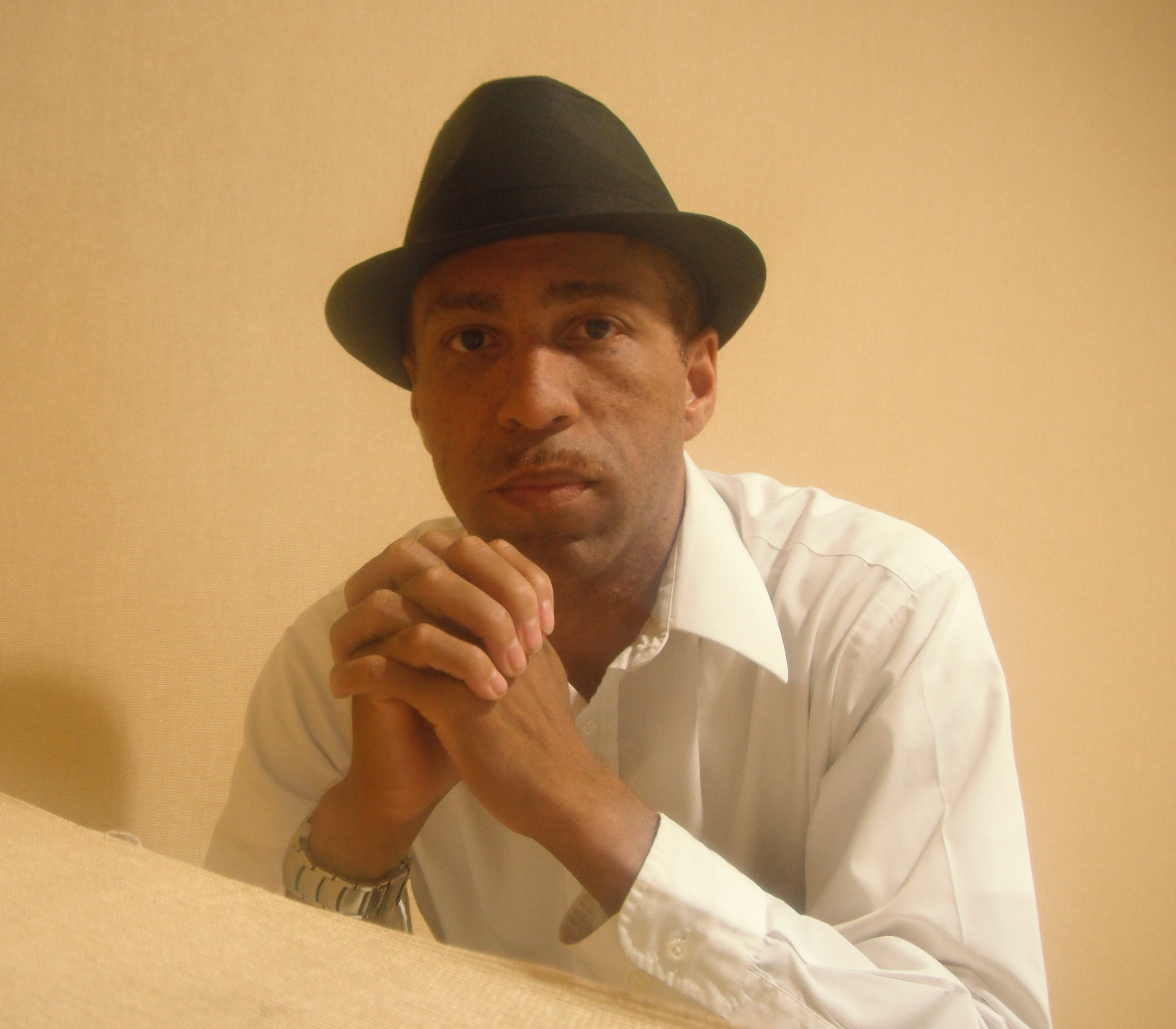
- Activist, author and songwriter, Perry Redd
- Born: Perry Dawhayne McCreary; August 25, 1964 (age 61); Washington, D.C., United States
- Occupation(s): Social, political and legal activist
- Organization: Sincere Seven
- Notable work: As A Condition of Your Freedom: A Guide to self-Redemption From Societal Oppression
- Children: Perri Redd
- Parent: Jacquelyn Latimore
- Website: http://perryreddmusic.com/

Perry Redd (born Perry Dawhayne McCreary, August 25, 1964) is an American social activist and organizer, and songwriter. He has advocated chiefly for workers' rights in Knoxville, Tennessee and, as a songwriter, co-founded Sincere Seven, an IRS-designated 501(c)3 tax-deductible nonprofit organization. He was sentenced to imprisonment on two occasions.

== Early life ==
Redd was born and raised in Washington, D.C., by his mother, Jacquelyn Latimore. He has three siblings, including one brother, comedian Olson "PerryRedd" Parker. He attended 16 different public schools, and graduated from H.D. Woodson Senior High School in 1982.

Aspiring to a professional soccer career, Redd got his first job at age 15 with the Washington Diplomats Pro Soccer Club.

Redd is an ASCAP-licensed songwriter with 15 published full-length albums.

== Activism ==
In 1990 Redd moved to Knoxville, Tennessee. As an American Book Company employee, Redd co-founded the Sincere Seven (S7) in 1999, with co-workers Terry Taylor, Kenneth Glass, and the late Theresa Reed. As S7's Executive Director from 1999 to 2004, Redd organized campaigns against several corporations because of their systematic and ongoing discrimination against low-paid workers. He championed worker justice in a unionizing campaign at the University of Tennessee that led to the formation of the United Campus Workers (UCW). He worked on Knoxville's Living Wage Campaign, served on several boards and testified before city council on Knoxville Empowerment Zone issues.

=== Campaigns ===
During its zenith from 1999 to 2004, Redd, as Executive Director of S7, led several campaigns for improved workers for unionized and non-unionized workers at large organizations including Kelsan, Wackenhut (now G4S), Fulton Bellows, and Lockheed-Martin. In 2002 Redd, with the Black Law Student Association at the University of Tennessee, organized a successful campaign against racial discrimination in a "Blackface" incident on campus that led to the University instituting new policies and programs on racial diversity and cultural awareness. S7 sponsored and hosted "Embracing the Community," an annual information and cultural festival.

=== Media productions ===
Redd produced public-access television cable TV shows Knoxville's Workplace Talk and S7Live!. S7's activities are listed on the S7 archived web site. Redd also produced S7 Radio and moderated 'State of the District', a television platform for Knoxville City Councilman Danny Mayfield, and Cop Watch, a Citizens for Police Review program.

Redd is the author of two self-published books: As A Condition of Your Freedom: A Guide to Self-Redemption From Societal Oppression (with the introduction by Professor David Schwartzman) (2014) and Perry NoName: A Journal From A Federal Prison, Book 1 (2014).

Redd also produced S7's monthly newsletter S7 Infoletter and online commentary The Other Side of the Tracks, which as of 2013 he continued to write and publish as a weekly syndicated column published by Redd Media and The Black Commentator, when in 2013 S7 became fiscal sponsor to a Washington, D.C.-based LPFM venture, WOOK Radio. The sponsored program was initially awarded a LPFM construction permit to broadcast on 103.1 FM. In an attempt to seize control over WOOK from founder and president William Tucker, Jr., Redd and S7 moved to terminate Tucker—neither an employee nor member of S7—in January 2015, accusing him of fiscal misconduct. Subsequently, Redd began misrepresenting himself as the station's interim general manager and S7 as the party in [operational] control of the license. Redd and S7 continued to escalate the conflict with Tucker over the following months for S7 to file suit against him in October 2015, claiming breach of contract, tortious interference, and negligent misrepresentation. In February 2017, S7's lawsuit was dismissed by D.C. Superior Court Judge Jennifer DiToro, leaving Tucker in control of WOOK, but not before the FCC rescinded the construction permit for 103.1 FM, ruling the fiscal sponsorship agreement between WOOK Radio and S7 was an attempt, "... to prosecute a false application".

=== Speaking ===
Redd has spoken promoting social change at unionizing drives, worker and day labor rights, living wage and election campaigns, anti-war and disarmament protests, anti-police brutality rallies, civil rights and ex-offender re-enfranchisement forums, and death penalty vigils. Redd and Sincere Seven members spoke at the Glenmary Commission on Justice, Gathering 2002. Redd frequently addressed East Knoxville concerns at Knoxville City Council meetings. He received several civic and community commendations and honors, including Appalshop's Carpetbag Theatre production about S7.

More recently, Redd has made several television appearances espousing racial injustice and racial disparity regarding law enforcement and the criminal justice system toward Black Americans. Redd spoke out forcefully during 2015 calling for police firings, arrests, prosecutions and imprisonment in response to the repeated killings of Black Americans at the hands of law enforcement authorities.

=== Political activism ===
Redd has participated in several political campaigns. In 1999 Redd was asked by Knoxville City Councilman Danny Mayfield to host the councilman's monthly cable TV talk show. Redd served in Mayfield's 1999 run for mayor against the incumbent, Victor Ashe. He also campaigned in Knoxville, courting the black vote for candidates Bob Becker and Chris Woodhull's 2003 campaigns. Redd later served as co-Campaign Manager for DC Statehood Green Party candidate Darryl Moch's 2010 run for an At-Large seat in Washington, DC's City Council race.

Redd was the DC Statehood Green Party's nominated candidate in DC's At-Large Council race in its April 23, 2013 Special Election. He campaigned on affordable housing, jobs and equal rights for returning citizens, government ethics and accountability, preserving public assets and refused to support gentrification at the expense of longtime residents. He garnered less than 2% of the city's vote. Redd ran for the DC Council again during the COVID-19 era in 2020, vying for the Ward 4 seat against Democrat, Janeese Lewis George, losing with just over 5% of the vote.

Redd sought election as Advisory Neighborhood Commissioner (ANC) in DC's upper northwest Brightwood-Manor Park neighborhood in 2016, losing that bid, only to run a write-in campaign and win in November 2018 and currently serves as commissioner of Ward 4's ANC 4B05.

== Legal activism ==
In 1996, Redd served two years in Brushy Mountain State Penitentiary. He was released in 1998 and returned to his job at ABC book warehouse. Subsequently, Redd served as Co-Pastor of Holy Jerusalem Church of God, located in Mechanicsville, Knoxville for two years. He urged congregants to organize to save the 70-year-old church from condemnation by the city, but it was compulsorily purchased by eminent domain and demolished; a single-family home was constructed on the site. The January 31, 2002 issue of the Knoxville News Sentinel reported church members stating that city officials forced them to sell their site. Redd and six fellow laborers founded S7 in an effort to unionize their workplace. S7's work expanded into anti-police brutality, reparations and fair housing advocacy.

=== Arrest ===
Redd was arrested, and indicted in early 2004 on drug trafficking charges, which he denied, alleging that the charges were contrived in retaliation for S7's challenges to police brutality in East Knoxville. In late 2004 he was convicted via plea agreement and sentenced in Knoxville. Redd fired his court-appointed counsel and challenged his conviction pro se; in February 2007, the 6th Circuit Court of Appeals ruled in Redd's favor vacating, thus overturning his conviction. The Federal prosecutor's office subsequently pursued even greater charges after Redd refused a second plea bargain from the US government. A jury retrial in April 2008 acquitted Redd on all the major felony drug and gun trafficking charges against him, convicting him on lesser, misdemeanor charges; he was released from federal prison in July 2009. This process was reported by the Knoxville News-Sentinel. Redd appealed against the lesser charges he had been found guilty of, but in October 2010 the appeal failed.

=== Imprisonment ===
Redd was sentenced to imprisonment at Cumberland Federal Correctional Institution. He fired his court-appointed public defender and represented himself pro se before the Sixth Circuit Court of Appeals; the court overturned his conviction in 2007. In April 2008, Redd was re-tried by federal prosecutors on six charges, stemming from a prosecutorial superseding indictment, including felony gun and drug conspiracy. Redd was acquitted by a jury in Tennessee District Court at Chattanooga on all of the major firearm and drug charges, effectively avoiding a possible 42-year mandatory minimum sentence.

=== Controversy ===
Many believe Police Citizens for Police Review's Camcorder Troopers, and Redd's continued and public demands for improved police accountability and criticism of political leaders, provoked anger among Knoxville's law enforcement community and elected leaders.

In July 2009, Redd returned to Washington, D.C. and took up social commentary, digital media production and advocacy regarding ex-offenders, affordable housing and a variety of other issues.

== Songwriter and socio-political commentator ==
For over 35 years Redd has written social change hip-hop, R&B/Funk, spoken-word, secular and Christian religious songs. As leader of the band Reddex from 1986 to 1993, he recorded and performed in small live venues in the Washington, D.C. area, followed by a short stint in Knoxville during the early 1990s. Years later, Redd formed 'Perry Redd and the S7 Band' in 2000 Redd began writing social change compositions. In 1996, he founded Redd Media (formerly, Redd Music, Inc.), a recording and production studio.

Redd has written more than 3,000 compositions, including over 100 collaborations with singers, songwriters, poets, and musicians. Fifteen full-length albums, "The Activist" (2000, the re-mastered re-release in 2020), "Runaway Slave" (2002), "Unauthorized Authorized" (2003), "Nu Style Activist" (2004), along with his first music video, "One Voice" (2004), Redd's list of digital music releases include, "Trial by Fire" (2010), "Strange Revolution" (2012), a skeptical critique of the Arab Spring. In July 2013 Redd released "Run", a social commentary of America's rampant racism. Redd is among the few American singer/songwriters to produce and twice release three full-length CD/Digital Media projects in a single calendar year, releasing Never Been Rich in January 2014 as a social commentary on wealth disparity in the US, Tornadoes In April in April 2014 and You Redd My Soul in October of the same year. Redd's most recent releases include "Hands Off Redd" (2016), "Inspirations From the Prince," "When the Revolution's Over" (2017), "Rest Eternal," "A Redd Led Life" and "If Redd Said Vote" (2018)(the second time Redd had released three full-length albums in one calendar year); "Had You Redd the News" (2020), Most spoke about social ills and solutions, though Redd also produced traditional R&B/Soul albums as well.

Redd has written more than 200 political and social commentaries authoring "The Other Side of the Tracks" as the brand for his radio show, Socially Speaking; that commentary posts weekly on the on-line magazine, "The Black Commentator." As of 2019 he is the current host and producer of Socially Speaking, a socio-political talk radio show that aired on im4radio internet network (Largo, MD-based) and on WOOK-LP, 103.1fm and subsequently as an internet podcast produced by Redd Media for 10 years.

== Personal life ==
Redd married Angela Fletcher in 1986; they divorced in 1990. The couple had a daughter. His second marriage in 1997 also ended in divorce from Juanita Matthews in 2000. Redd currently resides in Washington, D.C.
