= Christina Henderson (politician) =

American politician (born 1985)

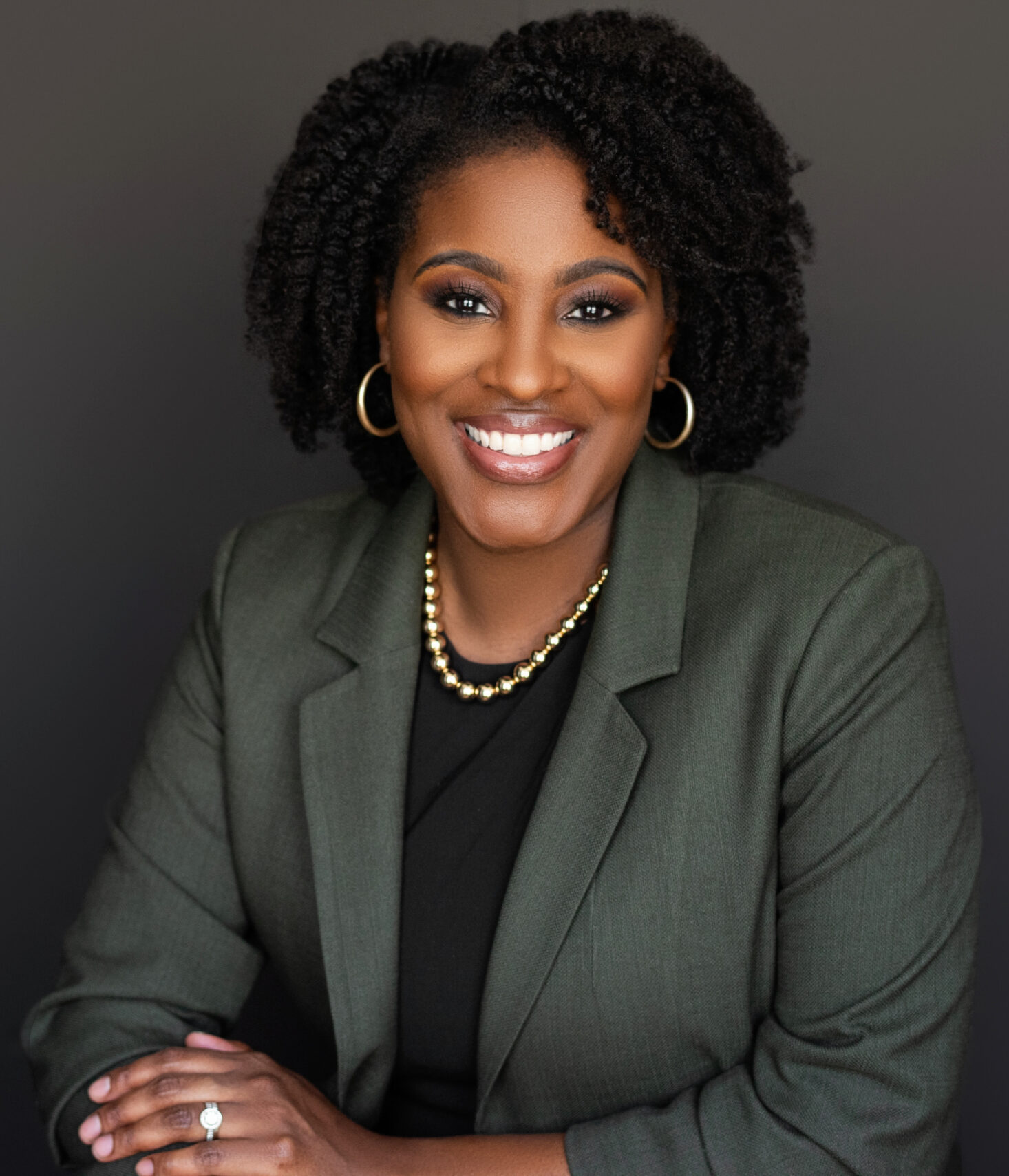
- Official portrait, 2022

Member of the Council of the District of Columbia from the at-large district
- Incumbent
- Assumed office January 2, 2021
- Preceded by: David Grosso

Personal details
- Born: October 10, 1985 (age 41) New York City, New York, U.S.
- Party: Democratic (before 2020, 2026); Independent (2020–2026, 2026–present)
- Spouse: Nu Wexler (m. 2016)
- Children: 1
- Education: Furman University (BA); Princeton University (MPA)
- Website: Campaign website

Christina Henderson (born October 10, 1985) is an American politician serving as an at-large member of the Council of the District of Columbia. An Independent, Henderson was first elected in 2020 and re-elected in 2024.

== Early life and career ==
Henderson was born in Brooklyn, New York. Her mother joined the U.S. Army when she was young, leading the family to relocate multiple times. She attended Furman University. During college, Henderson campaigned for Hillary Clinton in the 2008 Democratic Party presidential primaries. She is a member of Alpha Kappa Alpha.

After graduating from Furman University, Henderson moved to Washington, D.C. and worked as a legislative staffer in U.S. Senator Kay Hagan's office following her election in 2008. Henderson then graduated from Princeton University with a Master of Public Administration and worked in the office of human capital at District of Columbia Public Schools. In 2013, Henderson began working as deputy chief of staff to Independent member of the Council of the District of Columbia David Grosso and was staff director of the council's education committee when he became its chair in 2015. Following the 2016 U.S. Presidential election, Henderson joined U.S. Senator Chuck Schumer's office as a legislative assistant.

== Council of the District of Columbia ==
=== 2020 election ===
In the 2020 Council of the District of Columbia election, Henderson announced her campaign to succeed Grosso as an Independent at-large councilmember with his endorsement. As a candidate, Henderson said one of the first bills she planned to introduce was ranked choice voting. She cast herself as a "pragmatic progressive" supporting tax increases on the wealthy and reforms to rent control. She was also skeptical of defunding the police, instead supporting retaining the Metropolitan Police Department force's current size. The Washington Post editorial board endorsed her and Marcus Goodwin.

On election day, several voters received texts encouraging them to vote for "Christina Anderson [sic]" on the second line on the ballot— despite Henderson being listed in the first line. She ultimately won with 15% of the vote and declared victory on election night, defeating former councilmember Vincent Orange and D.C. Fiscal Policy Institute director Ed Lazere among others. Her election marked the first time the council was majority women and the first time since 2012 that it was majority Black.

=== Tenure ===
On November 3, 2026, Henderson announced she had changed her affiliation to the Democratic Party a day after Democratic councilmember Robert White resigned his seat to be elected congressional delegate. The change affected the process for filling White's vacant seat, as the Home Rule Act gives the District of Columbia Democratic State Committee the power to appoint party-elected vacancies. The move was also viewed as potentially setting up Henderson to run for council chair in 2030. Days later on November 6, she announced she would re-register as an independent after the District of Columbia Board of Elections and chairman Phil Mendelson stated they would honor the D.C. Democratic State Committee's interim appointment of Jamal Holtz.

== Personal life ==
Henderson and her husband, Nu Wexler, met while working on Capitol Hill and got married in 2016. They reside in Petworth and have a daughter.
