= Janeese Lewis George =

Mayor-elect of the District of Columbia (born 1988)

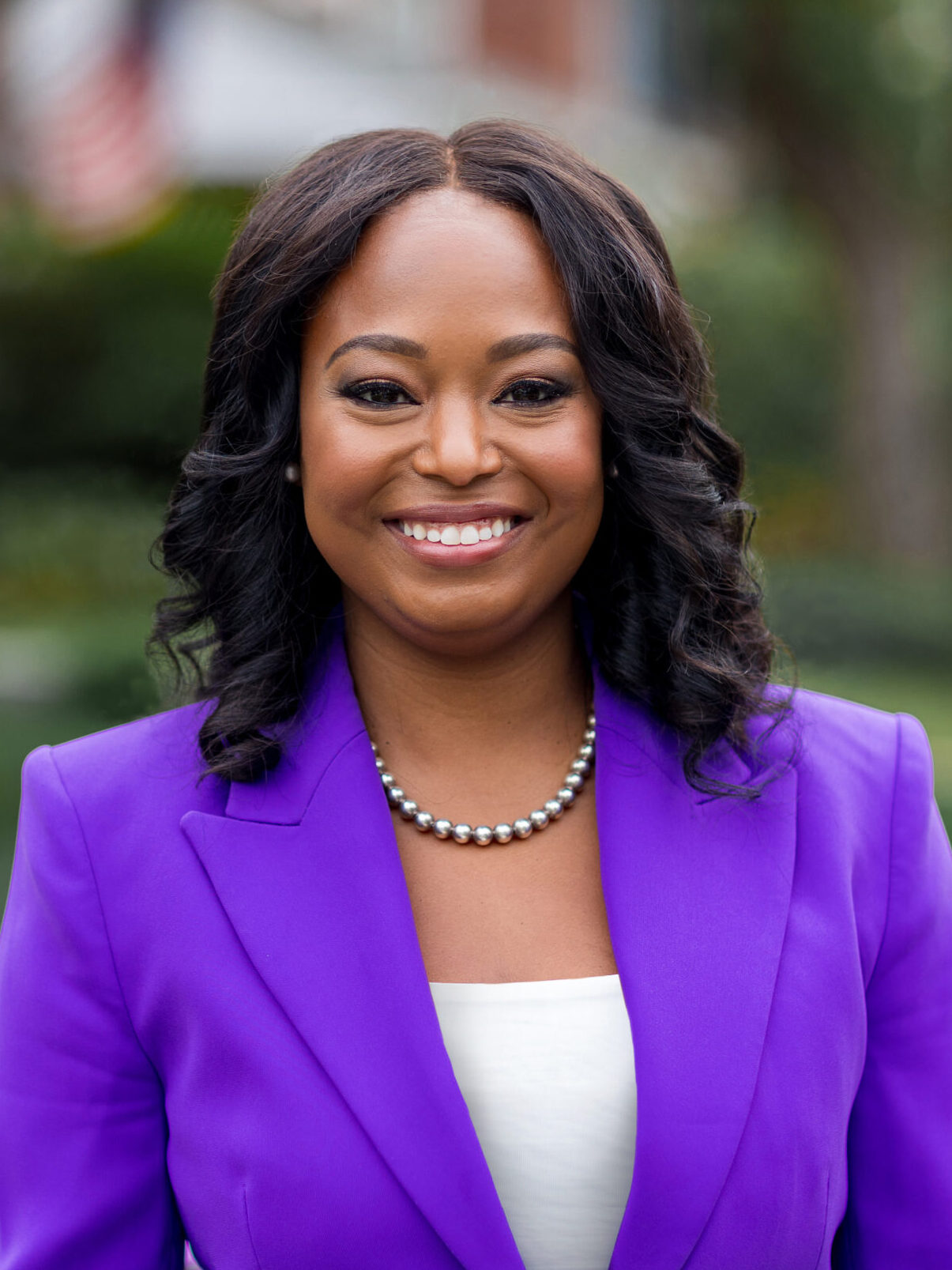
- Official portrait, 2023

Mayor-elect of the District of Columbia
- Assuming office January 2, 2027
- Succeeding: Muriel Bowser

Member of the Council of the District of Columbia from Ward 4
- Incumbent
- Assumed office January 2, 2021
- Preceded by: Brandon Todd

Personal details
- Born: Janeese Tynika Lewis; April 30, 1988 (age 38) Washington, D.C., U.S.
- Party: Democratic
- Other political affiliations: Democratic Socialists of America (Note: The Democratic Socialists of America (DSA) are not a registered political party. Instead, they are a political organization for those with democratic socialist ideologies. Lewis George is a member of and is endorsed by the Metro DC DSA chapter.)
- Spouse: Kyle George (m. 2019)
- Children: 1
- Education: St. John's University (BA); Howard University (JD)
- Website: Office website Campaign website

Janeese Tynika Lewis George (born April 30, 1988) is an American politician, lawyer, and activist who is the mayor-elect of Washington, D.C. A member of the Democratic Party, she is a member of the Council of the District of Columbia from Ward 4. Elected in November 2020, she became the first self-described democratic socialist to serve as a member of the Council since Hilda Mason was defeated for re-election in 1998.

== Early life and career ==
Lewis George is a third-generation Washingtonian and was raised in Ward 4 of Washington, D.C. Her mother worked as a union postal worker and her paternal grandmother served as a lunch lady at Alice Deal Middle School. She attended the School Without Walls in the Foggy Bottom neighborhood. While in high school, she was a voting student representative of DC School Board.

She earned a Bachelor of Arts degree in politics and government from St. John's University. After graduating from St. John's University, she worked in Los Angeles for AmeriCorps for one year. She earned a Juris Doctor from the Howard University School of Law, working at Nordstrom Rack and as a waitress to pay her tuition. While in university, her family was displaced from her childhood home due to a rent hike, spurring her interest in tenant rights.

After graduation from law school, Lewis George worked as a prosecutor in adult criminal cases in Philadelphia. In 2016, she returned to D.C. to care for her ailing father and work in the office of Attorney General for the District of Columbia Karl Racine as a juvenile prosecutor. Lewis George was a member of the American Federation of Government Employees Local 1403 while working at the Attorney General's office.

As a juvenile prosecutor, she focused on diverting cases to behavioral health and restorative justice systems over criminal proceedings. She joined the Democratic Socialists of America in 2018. Before launching her campaign for the council, she worked for the District of Columbia State Board of Education.

== Political career ==
=== D.C. council ===
In 2019, Lewis George launched her campaign for the Council of the District of Columbia. Lewis George was the subject of attack ads by Democrats for Education Reform, an advocacy group that supports charter schools, over claims that she would defund the police. She was endorsed by a significant number of progressive groups, including Black Lives Matter, the Working Families Party and the Metro DC Democratic Socialists of America.

Lewis George was the first candidate to reach the limit in matching funds through the District's public financing program since it was initiated. The program provides matching funds but limits donations to $50 per supporter, of which she had almost 1,200 by March 2020. On June 2, she defeated incumbent Brandon Todd by an 11.7-point margin. She was elected to the Council of the District of Columbia in November 2020.

In 2025, she administered the oath of office for councilmember Trayon White, who she has named as a mentor, after he was expelled following bribery charges and re-elected to the council.

=== 2026 D.C. mayoral election ===
On December 1, 2025, Lewis George announced her candidacy for mayor of the District of Columbia in the 2026 election. During the primary, United States president Donald Trump threatened to enact a federal takeover of the city if Lewis George were elected. In the final week before the primary, Lewis George's campaign was fined $16,000 after the Office of Campaign Finance found improper coordination between labor unions and an independent expenditure committee. Two days after the primary election on June 16, 2026, she secured the Democratic nomination and her opponent Kenyan McDuffie conceded the race. Lewis George was elected with 84% of the vote in the November 2026 elections and will be the first democratic socialist mayor of Washington, D.C.

== Political views ==
Lewis George describes herself as a democratic socialist and is a member of the Democratic Socialists of America. Lewis George is a supporter of the District of Columbia statehood movement.

=== Housing ===
In 2021, she proposed a social housing model of publicly owned and subsidized mixed-income housing. In April 2022, Lewis George introduced two bills inspired by the Green New Deal. The bills would create an agency to construct and maintain mixed-income social housing, and accelerate the removal of lead pipes.

As councilmember, in 2024 she opposed converting a Ward 4 single-family home into three-bedroom apartment units, noting that the project raised concerns regarding community character and parking constraints.

Lewis George introduced the Extreme Heat Eviction Prevention Act of 2025, which would prevent tenant evictions on days when the temperature is predicted to be above 95 °F (35 °C). During her 2026 mayoral campaign, she called for zoning reform to increase the housing supply, expansion of rent control policies, and constructions of publicly owned mixed-income housing.

=== Law enforcement ===
As a candidate for DC Council in 2019, Lewis George stated that she supported divesting funding from D.C. Police into violence interruption programs and won the endorsement of Black Lives Matter DC. As a councilmember, Lewis George supported a 2023 revision of the criminal code and called Congressional efforts to block the code "part of a long history of racism".

As councilmember she introduced legislation to end cooperation between D.C. Police and ICE. During her 2026 mayoral campaign, she stated that she opposes declarations of curfew zones to prevent teen takeovers.

=== Other ===
In 2021, she authored a tax increase to 9.25% on residents with an income over $250,000 to fund housing vouchers and childcare worker wage increases. During her 2026 mayoral campaign, she released a plan to create a subsidy for universal childcare.

In 2026, she expressed opposition to the expansion of robotaxis into Washington, D.C., citing potential job losses for drivers.

== Personal life ==
Lewis George is married to Kyle George, whom she met at a high school graduation party and married in 2019. She gave birth to their son in October 2024. As of 2026, the two live in the Manor Park neighborhood of Washington, D.C.

== Electoral history ==
2020 Council of the District of Columbia, Ward 4, Democratic primary
Party	Candidate	Votes	%
Democratic	Janeese Lewis George	10,965	54.76
Democratic	Brandon Todd (incumbent)	8,624	43.07
Democratic	Marlena Edwards	411	2.05

2020 Council of the District of Columbia, Ward 4, general election
Party	Candidate	Votes	%
Democratic	Janeese Lewis George	38,990	91.76
Green	Perry Redd	2,434	5.73
Write-in		1065	2.51

2024 Council of the District of Columbia, Ward 4, Democratic primary
Party	Candidate	Votes	%
Democratic	Janeese Lewis George	10,683	66.23
Democratic	Lisa Gore	4,543	28.16
Democratic	Paul Johnson	848	5.26
Write-in		57	0.35

2024 Council of the District of Columbia, Ward 4, general election
Party	Candidate	Votes	%
Democratic	Janeese Lewis George	36.319	96.64
Write-in		1,262	3.36

2026 Council of the District of Columbia, Mayor election, Democratic primary
Party	Candidate	Votes	%
Democratic	Janeese Lewis George	76,276	54.13
Democratic	Kenyan McDuffie	49,414	35.07
Democratic	Rini Sampath	4,544	3.22
Democratic	Gary Goodweather	4,403	3.12
Democratic	Vincent Orange	3,582	2.54
Democratic	Hope Solomon	1,501	1.07
Democratic	Ernest Johnson	717	0.51
Write-in		463	0.33
Total votes		140,900	100.00
n/a	Overvotes	581	
n/a	Undervotes	927	

== See also ==
- List of female governors in the United States
- List of mayors of the 50 largest cities in the United States

== Notes ==
Party political offices
Preceded by Muriel Bowser	Democratic nominee for Mayor of the District of Columbia; 2026	Most recent
Political offices
Preceded by Muriel Bowser	Mayor of the District of Columbia; Taking office 2027	Elect
