= Jews United for Justice =

American non-profit organization

- Founded: 1998; 28 years ago
- Type: Nonprofit
- Headquarters: Washington, D.C. and Baltimore
- Executive Director: Jacob Feinspan
- Website: https://jufj.org/

Jews United for Justice (JUFJ) is a Jewish social justice organization based in the Washington–Baltimore metropolitan area.

== History ==
Jews United for Justice was founded in 1998 by Simon Greer.

JUFJ had a presence in Washington, D.C., and Montgomery County, Maryland, for many years. In 2014, the organization decided to create a Baltimore chapter of the organization and appointed Molly Amster as the executive director.

In 2018, when the DC Councilmember Trayon White made statements claiming that the Rothschild family controlled the weather, JUFJ announced that they were working with White to help him develop a deeper understanding of the history of antisemitic rhetoric. JUFJ had endorsed White's campaign in 2016. White later stated that JUFJ was "helping me to understand the history of comments made against Jews and I am committed to figuring out ways continue to be allies with them and others."

The Jews United for Justice Campaign Fund endorsed Ben Jealous for Governor in 2018.

In 2019, the Baltimore branch of JUFJ and Baltimore Jews Against ICE organized an Abolish ICE march.

JUFJ endorsed a "Yes" vote in the 2022 Maryland Question 4 voter referendum that legalized recreational marijuana in the state of Maryland, further stating that the legislation did not do enough to give reparations to Black Marylanders who have been harmed by the criminalization of marijuana.

== Positions ==
JUFJ has been active in the movement for paid family leave in Washington, D.C., serving as a lead partner in the DC Paid Family Leave Coalition. The organization offers paid family leave to its own employees.

Because Jews United for Justice is an organization that prioritizes local issues in the Baltimore–Washington metropolitan area, the organization takes no public position on the Israeli–Palestinian conflict.

== See also ==
- History of the Jews in Maryland
  - History of the Jews in Baltimore
- History of the Jews in Washington, D.C.
- Jewish left
