= Democrats for Education Reform =

American political action committee

Democrats for Education Reform (DFER) is a New York-based left-of-center political action committee and advocacy group which focuses on encouraging the Democratic Party to support public education reform and charter schools.

== History ==
DFER emerged around the same time as the Education Equality Project. Hedge fund manager and philanthropist Whitney Tilson and lawyer and former politician Kevin P. Chavous are among the group's co-founders.

== Positions ==
DFER claims to support five policy areas: resource equity, teacher quality and preparation, accountability, public school choice, and higher ed quality and affordability. In 2018, the Colorado Democratic Party asked the Colorado DFER chapter to stop using "Democrats" in its name.

== Leadership ==
Shavar Jeffries, one of the charter school sector's most prominent Black leaders, became the president of the organization in 2015. Since 2023, the organization is led by Jorge Elorza, former mayor of Providence, Rhode Island.

== Activities ==
In Washington D.C., DFER sent out attack ads against Janeese Lewis George, a progressive candidate for D.C. city council. After conducting polling that showed voters were concerned about crime, DFER ran mailers that claimed that George would defund the police. After the election, DFER apologized for its efforts.
