= District of Columbia State Board of Education =

Independent executive agency of the District of Columbia

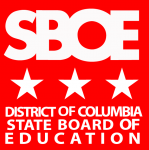
- Logo of the District of Columbia State Board of Education

Agency overview
- Formed: 1804 (legal predecessor); 2004 (current agency)
- Jurisdiction: District of Columbia
- Headquarters: One Judiciary Square, Washington, D.C. 20001; 38°53′43.6266″N 77°0′56.1486″W
- Employees: 18 FTEs
- Annual budget: $1,151,555
- Agency executive: Bernice Butler, Executive Director
- Website: Official website

The District of Columbia State Board of Education (SBOE) is an independent executive branch agency of the Government of the District of Columbia, in the United States. The SBOE provides advocacy and policy guidance for the District of Columbia Public Schools, and works with the Chancellor of the District of Columbia Public Schools and the District of Columbia State Superintendent of Education. Charter schools are overseen by the District of Columbia Public Charter School Board.

== Early boards of education ==
Authority for the establishment of public education in the District of Columbia was granted by the United States Congress in 1802, when the existing Commissioner system of government was abolished and a mayor-council government created. Two years later, a 13-member Board of Trustees was established to oversee schools in the District. Seven members were appointed by the mayor, while the remaining six were elected by those citizens who had donated funds to the city's school system. Thomas Jefferson was elected to the board, and became its first president (serving until 1808).

The City Council divided the District of Columbia into two school districts in 1816. One was governed by the existing Board of Trustees, and the other by a board appointed by the council. Two years later, the "old board" was abolished and replaced by a board appointed solely by the council.

For most of the 19th century, the District of Columbia was divided into three distinct legal entities: The Federal City (consisting mostly of the area south of Florida Avenue), the town of Georgetown, the town of Alexandria, and the County of Washington (that part of the District not included in the previous three entities). In 1842, Georgetown established a seven-member Board of School Guardians to oversee private schools receiving public funds. Two years later, the Federal City's two school boards were merged into a single 13-member board. Three board members were appointed by the council from each of the city's four wards, while the mayor served as the board president. The council turned over its appointment authority to the mayor in 1858, and for the first time the board of trustees was required to promulgate an annual budget and annual report.

Schools in the District of Columbia were segregated by race from the beginning. Although the city's first school for African American children was created in 1807, it was not until 1862 that an oversight body was created for these schools. That year, the United States Secretary of the Interior established and appointed a Board of Trustees for Colored Schools. In 1864, Congress enacted legislation establishing a seven-member School Commission to oversee public schools in Washington County. Members of the board were appointed by the Washington County Levy Court.

The District of Columbia's first Superintendent of Education was created by the City Council in 1869. The mayor was given authority to appoint this position.

In 1871, Congress merged the county, Georgetown, and Federal City into a single legal entity (Alexandria having been retroceded to Virginia in 1846). The new "territorial government" retains school boards for the Federal City, Georgetown, and old county, and appoints a superintendent of education for each board. The Secretary of the Interior also retained separate school boards for African American schools in the Federal City and Georgetown, and began appointing a superintendent of education for each. Two years later, Congress turned authority to appoint the superintendents for black schools to the territorial government.

Congress abolished the territorial government in 1874, and created a three-member commission to oversee the District of Columbia. Congress also abolished all the city's school boards and replaced them with a single, 19-member Board of School Trustees. Congress also required the commissioners to appoint two superintendents of education, one for white schools and one for black schools. Congress reduced the size of the board to nine members in 1882, and required that three of them be African Americans. The commissioners attempted to take over the duties of the board of trustees in 1885, but protests from city residents forced the commissioners to return many of these powers to the board. Congress expanded the board's membership to 11 in 1895, and authorized the appointment of women to the board of trustees for the first time.

== Modern board of education ==
After a political struggle for control over public schools led to a congressional investigation in 1900, Congress significantly reformed public school governance again. New legislation established a seven-member Board of Education (BOE) whose members were appointed by the city's three federal commissioners. The BOE was given complete control over the public schools, and had the sole authority to appoint a superintendent and two assistant superintendents (one for white and one for black schools). The BOE also had the authority to hire and fire teachers and other school employees. The BOE was now required to submit an annual budget to the commissioners, who would review it and forward recommendations to Congress as part of the city's annual budget process.

Dissatisfied with the political nature of the commissioners' appointments to the BOE, in 1906 Congress reformed the Board of Education yet again. The board was expanded to nine members, three of whom were required to be women. The authority to appoint board members was turned over to the Supreme Court of the District of Columbia, and the authority of the BOE was strengthened and clarified (although budgetary authority remained with the commissioners). A tradition emerged in which three of the BOE's members were African American (two men and one woman). In 1936, Congress changed the name of the court to the District Court for the District of Columbia. The name changed to the United States District Court for the District of Columbia in 1948.

In 1954, the Supreme Court handed down its landmark decision in Bolling v. Sharpe, 347 U.S. 497 (1954), which desegregated public schools in the District of Columbia. In 1966, Euphemia Haynes became the first woman and first African-American woman to chair the BOE. Also in 1966, local school activist Julius Hobson sued the public school system, arguing that Black-majority schools in the District of Columbia were being deprived of resources. He argued the judges were caught by a conflict of interest by appointing the BOE and then later ruling on desegregation lawsuits involving the city schools. In Hobson v. Hansen, 269 F.Supp. 401 (1967), the U.S. District Court for the District of Columbia ruled in Hobson's favor. (An appeal by the superintendent of education failed in 1969.) The Hobson ruling led to widespread criticism of the existing BOE and governance structure of the D.C. public school system (some of it generated by the board itself).

== Marian Anderson controversy ==
In 1939, writing on behalf of the Board of Education of the District of Columbia, Superintendent Frank Ballou denied a request by contralto Marian Anderson to sing at the auditorium of the segregated white Central High School. As justification, he cited a federal law from 1906 requiring separate schools for the District. Meanwhile, the Daughters of the American Revolution had rejected a similar application.

When Eleanor Roosevelt resigned from that organization in protest, author Zora Neale Hurston criticized her for remaining silent about the fact that the Board had also excluded Anderson. “As far as the high-school auditorium is concerned,” Hurston declared “to jump the people responsible for racial bias would be to accuse and expose the accusers themselves. The District of Columbia has no home rule; it is controlled by congressional committees, and Congress at the time was overwhelmingly Democratic. It was controlled by the very people who were screaming so loudly against the DAR. To my way of thinking, both places should have been denounced, or neither.” Although Anderson later performed at an open-air concert at the Lincoln Memorial, the Board retained its policy of exclusion.

=== Post-home rule board of education ===
President Lyndon B. Johnson abolished the commissioner system of government in 1967, creating a new mayor-council form of government (albeit one appointed by the President of the United States). The following year, Congress enacted legislation creating an 11-member elected Board of Education. Fifty-three candidates ran for election to the board. With no clear winners, a run-off election was held on November 26, 1968. Hobson himself was elected to the BOE as an at-large member in 1969. Congress made the mayor-council form of government permanent after passing the District of Columbia Home Rule Act in 1973, which provided for a publicly elected mayor and city council.

With the city mismanaged and nearing bankruptcy, Congress enacted legislation in April 1995 creating the District of Columbia Financial Control Board. Budget authority over the public school system was stripped from the city, and given to the Control Board. That same year, under pressure from Congress, the Council of the District of Columbia enacted a package of educational reform proposals which included the establishment of charter schools in the District of Columbia for the first time. The reform legislation also created a new, independent District of Columbia Public Charter School Board to oversee these new schools. The Mayor of the District of Columbia was given authority to appoint the charter school board, although the BOE retained the power to issue charters for these schools.

In November 1996, the Control Board seized control of the D.C. public school system. Superintendent Franklin L. Smith was fired, and Lt. Gen. Julius W. Becton, Jr. was hired as the new superintendent. The BOE was stripped of nearly all its authority, and a new, nine-member Emergency Transitional Education Board of Trustees (appointed by the Control Board) took control of the school system. With the city's finances stabilizing, Congress enacted the National Capital Revitalization and Self-Government Improvement Act of 1997. The act allowed the Control Board to seize control of two-thirds of the city's agencies, and provided for restoration of local control of an agency only after the agency had achieved four successive balanced budgets. The Control Board hired Arlene Ackerman, a deputy superintendent of education in the Seattle public schools, as Becton's deputy superintendent and the system's new chief academic officer in July 1997. The same year, the Public Charter School Board began operation.

The BOE's deliberations proved rancorous in 1998. Beginning in April 1998, the chairman of the council's education committee, Kevin P. Chavous, led a nine-month effort to reconstitute and reform the Board of Education. After a long battle with mayor-elect Anthony A. Williams and other council members, the Council approved a Chavous-backed plan to reduce the size of the board from 11 members to seven. Two of the city's political wards would elect a representative to the new board (for a total of four members), while two members and the board president would be elected at-large. Ultimately, voters approved a "hybrid" board consisting of nine members-- four elected by four new school election districts combining two wards each, one at-large Board President, and four mayoral appointees-- in a close vote in June 2000. The Control Board gave up its governance authority over the BOE in January 1999, after Anthony A. Williams when took office as mayor.

Just nine months after taking up his second term in office, Mayor Williams introduced legislation to strip the BOE of nearly all its power, giving this to the mayor. Under Williams' proposal, the mayor would have the right to hire and fire the superintendent, principals, teachers, and other workers, and would gain significant new powers to reconstitute programs, operations, curriculum, and even entire schools. Chavous threw his support behind Williams' plan. Little action was taken, however, and in February 2004 Chavous said he no longer supported the mayor's bill, citing a need for structural stability in order to attract a quality superintendent. With the hybrid system set to expire in July 2004, the council had the opportunity to renew or replace the structure of the board. It chose to retain the hybrid school board system until 2006, after which an all-elected nine-member board, with eight ward-elected members and one member elected at-large, would be enacted. The council approved the bill in July 2004 on a close 7-to-6 vote.

=== Post-reform role of the SBOE ===
The "Public Education Reform Act Amendments of 2007" (PERAA) replaced the existing Board of Education with a new State Board of Education (SBOE). The SBOE's role is to advise the Office of the State Superintendent of Education (another new body created by PERAA). Other duties and functions include:

1. Approve recommendations on academic standards as recommended by the Office of the State Superintendent of Education (OSSE);
2. Approve graduation standards for high school students;
3. Approve standards for the Certificate of High School Equivalency;
4. Approve definitions for "adequate yearly progress" (AYP) and "proficiency" and standards for "highly qualified teachers", all of which are applied to all local education agencies;
5. Approve standards for the accreditation of teacher preparation programs at the post-secondary level, and for the certification of teachers completing and graduating from such programs;
6. Approve the State Accountability Plan for D.C. public schools developed by OSSE, to ensure that AYP is achieved and all local education agencies held accountable for achievement of AYP;
7. Approve policies to ensure parental involvement in the governance of the public schools and in the education of students;
8. Approve policies for nongovernmental education service providers operating in the District of Columbia;
9. Approve rules under which student residency may be verified;
10. Approve those organizations permitted to accredit charter schools in the District of Columbia;
11. Approve the format of and categories for assessment for the annual student report card, to meet the requirements of the federal No Child Left Behind Act;
12. Approve those organizations permitted to accredit private placement in the District of Columbia;
13. Approve rules to enforce student attendance requirements; and
14. Approve the state standards under which home schooling may occur.

OSSE and the SBOE collaborated on developing the District of Columbia's five-year strategic plan, which was required by PERAA. This plan, which covers education from early childhood to the 12th grade in all public schools (charter public schools included), was released in October 2008.

== D.C. State Board of Education members ==
As of January 2023, the following were members of the D.C. State Board of Education. The president of the State Board is elected by the members of the board annually. The elections are formally nonpartisan, with the party affiliations below reflecting known political history, candidate self-declaration, or state party support.

Ward	Name	Party	Start	Next Election
At large	Jacque Patterson, President	Democratic	January 2, 2021	2028
1	Ben Williams	Democratic	January 2, 2023	2026
2	Allister Chang	Democratic	January 2, 2021	2028
3	Eric Goulet, Vice President	Democratic	January 2, 2023	2026
4	Michelle Colson	Democratic	January 2, 2025	2028
5	Robert Henderson	Democratic	January 2, 2023	2026 (retiring)
6	Brandon Best	Democratic	January 2, 2023	2026 (retiring)
7	Eboni-Rose Thompson	Democratic	January 2, 2021	2028
8	LaJoy Johnson-Law	Democratic	January 2, 2025	2028

Student Representatives (2025–2026 School Year)

- Nyla Dinkins
- Perry Pixley Chamberlain
- Issa Ouarid
- Sitara Mazumdar

== Bibliography ==
- Richards, Mark David. "Public School Governance in the District of Columbia: A Timeline". Washington History. Fall–Winter 2004–2005: 23–25.
- Education Consortium for Research and Evaluation (September 9, 2013). Evaluation of the DC Public Education Reform Amendment Act (PERAA) (Report). Washington, D.C.
