= Todd Kim =

American lawyer

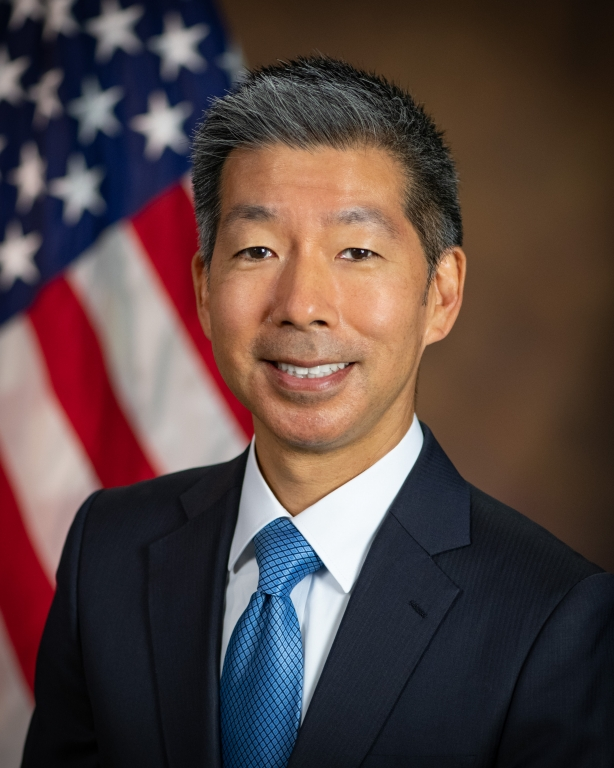

United States Assistant Attorney General for the Environment and Natural Resources Division
- In office July 28, 2021 – January 20, 2025
- President: Joe Biden
- Preceded by: Jeffrey Clark
- Succeeded by: Colin McDonald

1st Solicitor General of the District of Columbia
- In office March 22, 2006 – November 22, 2017
- Attorney General: Robert Spagnoletti; Linda Singer; Peter Nickles; Irvin B. Nathan; Karl Racine
- Preceded by: position established
- Succeeded by: Loren AliKhan

Personal details
- Born: Todd Sunhwae Kim New Jersey, U.S.
- Education: Harvard University (BA, JD)

Todd Sunhwae Kim is an American attorney who served as the United States Assistant Attorney General for the United States Department of Justice Environment and Natural Resources Division from 2021 to 2025. He earlier served as the first solicitor general of the District of Columbia for nearly 12 years. He was twice nominated by President Barack Obama for the District of Columbia Court of Appeals, but the Senate held no hearings on his nominations, which expired without action.

== Early life and education ==
Kim was born and raised in New Jersey. He received his B.A., magna cum laude, in biology from Harvard College in 1994 and his J.D., magna cum laude from Harvard Law School in 1997, where he was an executive editor of the Harvard Law Review. After law school, he served as a law clerk to Judith W. Rogers on the United States Court of Appeals for the District of Columbia Circuit.

== Professional career ==
Kim served for seven years as an appellate attorney for the United States Department of Justice Environment and Natural Resources Division.

=== Solicitor general for the District of Columbia ===
Kim was the first solicitor general of the District of Columbia, serving from 2006 to 2017. He was appointed by Attorney General Robert J. Spagnoletti to be responsible for all of the District's appellate litigation before the District of Columbia Court of Appeals, the United States Court of Appeals for the District of Columbia Circuit, and the Supreme Court of the United States. In 2017, his final year as solicitor general, Kim argued on behalf of the District in the Supreme Court in District of Columbia v. Wesby.

=== DC Court of Appeals nomination ===
In February 2014, President Barack Obama nominated Kim to a seat on the District of Columbia Court of Appeals, but his nomination was not acted upon. On April 30, 2015, President Obama re-nominated Kim to the position, but the Senate did not take action on that nomination either.

=== Private practice ===
In January 2018, he became a partner in Reed Smith's appellate practice. He left the firm in January 2021, joining the Biden administration as a deputy general counsel at the U.S. Department of Energy.

=== Biden administration ===
On March 15, 2021, it was announced that President Joe Biden would nominate Kim to serve as Assistant Attorney General for the United States Department of Justice Environment and Natural Resources Division. On April 14, 2021, a hearing on his nomination was held before the Senate Judiciary Committee. On May 13, 2021, his nomination was reported out of committee by a 15–7 vote. On July 27, 2021, the Senate confirmed Kim in a 58–41 vote. Kim was sworn in on July 28.

== Personal life ==
On February 22, 2004, Kim appeared as the first contestant on a short-run Who Wants to Be a Millionaire spin-off game show called Who Wants to Be a Super Millionaire, where he won $500,000. Kim decided to walk away from his $1,000,000 question.

Kim is married to Carolyn Hill; they have two sons.

Legal offices
Preceded by Jeffrey Clark	United States Assistant Attorney General for the Environment and Natural Resources Division; 2021–present	Incumbent
