= Solicitor General of the District of Columbia =

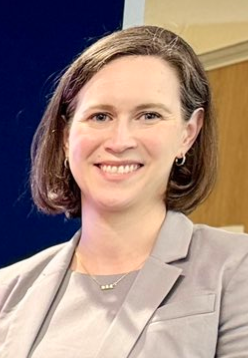
- Incumbent; Caroline Van Zile since February 8, 2022
- Type: Solicitor General
- Formation: March 2006
- First holder: Todd Kim

The Solicitor General of the District of Columbia, Washington, D.C. Solicitor General, or DC Solicitor General, is the top appellate solicitor or lawyer for Washington, D.C. It is an appointed position in the Office of the Attorney General for the District of Columbia that focuses on the office's major appellate cases.

== History ==
The Office of the Solicitor General handles litigation for the Office of the Attorney General in the appellate courts, including the District of Columbia Court of Appeals, the United States Court of Appeals for the District of Columbia Circuit and the Supreme Court of the United States. The Office's cases include appeals from trial courts in a wide variety of civil and criminal matters and petitions for review from more than fifty District agencies.

== List of Solicitors General ==
The Solicitor General as of 2022 is Caroline Van Zile. The following is a table of Washington, D.C. Solicitors.

Years	Portrait	D.C. Solicitor	D.C. Attorney General
2006– 2017		Todd Kim	Robert Spagnoletti; Linda Singer; Peter Nickles; Irvin B. Nathan; Karl Racine
2018–2022		Loren AliKhan	Karl Racine
2022–present		Caroline Van Zile	Karl Racine Brian Schwalb
