= 2022 District of Columbia Attorney General election =

- November 8, 2022
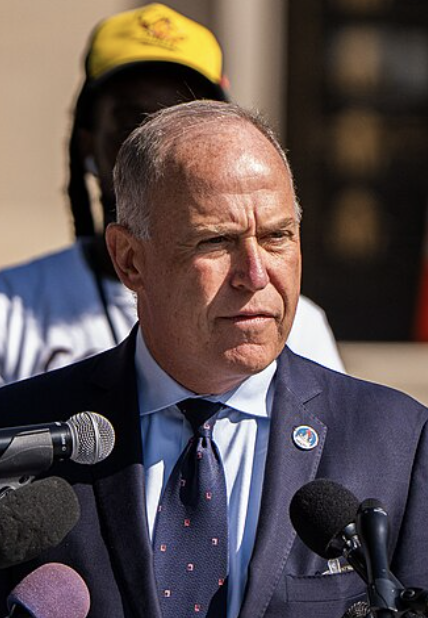
Nominee	Brian Schwalb
Party	Democratic
Popular vote	177,126
Percentage	97.51%
- Precinct results Schwalb: >90%
Attorney General before election
Karl Racine
Democratic
Elected Attorney General
Brian Schwalb
Democratic

The 2022 District of Columbia Attorney General election was held on November 8, 2022, to elect the next attorney general for the District of Columbia. This was the third attorney general election in D.C. history.

Incumbent attorney general Karl Racine had declined to run for reelection.

== Democratic primary ==
A Democratic primary was held on June 21, 2022. Incumbent attorney general Karl Racine was considered likely to run for mayor or reelection as attorney general, and even filed paperwork in 2020, but announced he would not run for any office in October 2021.

According to District election law, an candidate for attorney general must have been actively engaged as an attorney in the District for at least five of the previous ten years. In late March 2022, candidate Bruce Spiva filed a challenge with the Board of Elections in which he claimed frontrunner Kenyan McDuffie was ineligible to run for the position. The challenge said that McDuffie did not spend at least five of the previous ten years actively engaged as an attorney. McDuffie responded, saying he is an attorney and that his work as a Councilmember since 2012 should count toward the requirement. On April 18, the Board of Elections upheld Spiva's challenge, and ruled that McDuffie was ineligible to run for the office. McDuffie requested a rehearing, but the D.C. Court of Appeals denied his request.

=== Candidates ===
==== Declared ====
- Ryan Jones, attorney from Brightwood
- Brian Schwalb, attorney from Chevy Chase
- Bruce Spiva, attorney from Crestwood

==== Disqualified ====
- Kenyan McDuffie, Councilmember for Ward 5 (2012–present)

==== Declined ====
- Karl Racine, incumbent Attorney General for the District of Columbia (since 2015)

=== Endorsements ===
Ryan Jones
- Vincent Orange, former at-large Councilperson (2011–2016) and Councilperson for Ward 5 (1999–2007)
Kenyan McDuffie (disqualified)
- AFSCME District 20
- LiUNA Baltimore-Washington Laborers' District Council
- ~~SEIU 32BJ~~ (switched endorsement to Spiva after McDuffie was disqualified)
- UNITE HERE Local 25
Brian Schwalb

Individuals

- Charles Allen, councilperson from Ward 6 (2015–present)
- Irvin B. Nathan, last unelected Attorney General for the District of Columbia (2011–2014)
- Karl Racine, incumbent Attorney General for the District of Columbia (since 2015)

Organizations

- Eastern Atlantic States Regional Council of Carpenters
- Ironworkers Local 5
- United Association

Newspapers

- The Washington Post
Bruce Spiva

Individuals

- John Capozzi, former Shadow Member of the U.S. House of Representatives (1995–1997) and member of the District of Columbia Democratic State Committee
- Ed Lazere, candidate for Council of the District of Columbia in 2018
- Lorie Masters, attorney and candidate for Attorney General in 2014
- Donald B. Verrilli Jr., former Solicitor General of the United States (2011–2016)

Organizations

- SEIU 32BJ
- Sierra Club

=== Debates and forums ===
2022 District of Columbia Democratic attorney general primary debates and forums
No.	Date	Host	Moderator	Link	Participants			
P Participant A Absent N Non-invitee I Invitee W Withdrawn								
P Participant A Absent N Non-invitee I Invitee W Withdrawn					Jones	McDuffie	Schwalb	Spiva
1	Mar 5, 2022	Ward 7 Democrats	Dionna Lewis	Facebook	P	P	P	P
2	Apr 26, 2022	League of Women Voters/GWU	Dayna Bowen Matthew	Facebook	P	N	P	P
3	May 11, 2022	District of Columbia Bar	Keith Alexander; Sam Ford	YouTube	P	N	P	P

=== Results ===

Schwalb

30–40%
40–50%
50–60%
60–70%

Spiva

30–40%

Jones

30–40%

Schwalb

30–40%
40–50%
50–60%
60–70%
70–80%

Spiva

30–40%
40–50%
50–60%

Jones

30–40%
40–50%

Other

No votes

Democratic primary results
Party	Candidate	Votes	%
Democratic	Brian Schwalb	54,399	45.35
Democratic	Bruce V. Spiva	44,198	36.85
Democratic	Ryan L. Jones	20,518	17.11
Democratic	Write-in	827	0.69
Total votes		119,942	100
n/a	Overvotes	123	
n/a	Undervotes	8,266	

== General election ==
=== Results ===
2022 District of Columbia Attorney General election
Party	Candidate	Votes	%
Democratic	Brian Schwalb	177,126	97.51%
Independent	Write-in	4,516	2.49%
Total votes		181,642	100%
n/a	Overvotes	123	
n/a	Undervotes	23,647	

=== Results by ward ===
Ward	Brian Schwalb Democratic		Various candidates Other parties	
Ward	#	%	#	%
Ward 1	22,644	98.21%	413	1.79%
Ward 2	17.206	97.42%	456	2.58%
Ward 3	26,215	97.68%	624	2.32%
Ward 4	25,204	97.69%	596	2.31%
Ward 5	24,591	97.7%	580	2.3%
Ward 6	33,156	96.69%	1,136	3.31%
Ward 7	16,373	97.59%	404	2.41%
Ward 8	11,737	97.45%	307	2.55%
Total	177,126	97.51%	4,516	2.49%
