= Edward "Smitty" Smith =

American politician

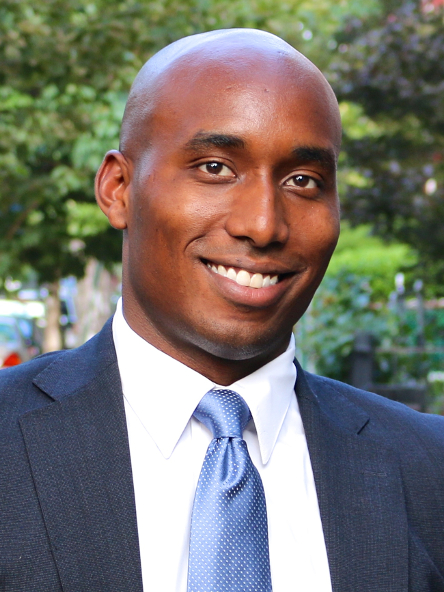

Personal details
- Born: 1980 (age 45–46) Washington, D.C. United States
- Party: Democratic
- Education: Brown University (BA); Harvard University (LLB)
- Occupation: Attorney
- Website: Smitty for AG

Edward H. "Smitty" Smith II (born 1980) is an American lawyer. He was a candidate for Attorney General of the District of Columbia in the 2014 election and a former adviser to the FCC.

== Early life and education ==
Smith was born in Washington, D.C., and grew up in the working-class neighborhoods of Congress Heights and LeDroit Park. His family moved to the District of Columbia in 1943 and he is the third generation of his family to live there. His father taught physics at Ballou High School and his mother worked in the federal government.

After winning scholarships to attend the Beauvoir School and the Potomac School, Smith earned a Bachelor's degree with honors from Brown University, where he was captain of the track team, and a J.D. from Harvard Law School.

== Career ==
Smith began his legal career as an associate attorney at the Washington, D.C. law firm Hogan & Hartson. After several years with the firm, he left to work on Barack Obama's 2008 presidential campaign. After the election, he was named Deputy General Counsel of the Presidential Inaugural Committee, and then joined the Department of Commerce, where he worked on the economic development of low-income communities.

At the National Telecommunications and Information Administration, Smith was named Program Director of the State Broadband Data and Development Grant Program. Under his leadership, and with funds allocated by the American Recovery and Reinvestment Act of 2009, the SBDDGP established the $4.7 billion Broadband Technology Opportunities Program, which extended and developed broadband services to reach rural and underserved areas, improved broadband access for public safety agencies, and provided financial assistance to low-income families to facilitate the transition from analog to digital television.

Smith later joined the FCC, where he was appointed Chief of Staff and Senior Counsel of the Incentive Auction Task Force, a multibillion-dollar radio spectrum allocation project assessing whether to set bidding limits on Verizon and AT&T, ensuring that the wavelengths at auction remained reserved for smaller carriers. On May 15, 2014, he spoke before an open meeting of the FCC in favor of bidding limits, and the Commissioners subsequently voted 3–2 in favor of the limits.

Following his campaign for attorney general, Smith joined DC government to run the District of Columbia's Justice Grants Administration. He then rejoined the FCC as an advisor before joining the law firm DLA Piper, where he won an award for his work representing T-Mobile.

He works with DC Vote, an organization that advocates for D.C. voting rights, and he sits on the Board of Directors of the We the People Project, which pursues litigation in support of “full and equal citizenship” for residents of D.C. and U.S. territories.

== Campaign for Attorney General ==
On July 12, 2014, Smith announced his candidacy for D.C. Attorney General at the former home of his grandmother in Washington, D.C.'s Shaw neighborhood.

Smith emphasized the need for reform of D.C.'s juvenile justice system. He saw the Attorney General's role as “cooperative” with the Council of the District of Columbia, and has expressed disagreement with sitting Attorney General Irvin B. Nathan's contention that the 2012 budget autonomy act approved by the Council violates the District of Columbia Home Rule Act.

On August 6, the campaign submitted 6,500 petition signatures, more than double the 3,000 required to get Smith's name on the ballot. Shortly before Smith's campaign finance report was released on August 11, he announced he had raised over $185,000 during the first fundraising quarter of the campaign, including more from outside donors than all other attorney general candidates combined (Karl Racine raised nearly $257,000, but he donated or loaned $225,000 of that total to his own campaign). According to the finance report, Smith's campaign paid a company owned by Jauhar Abraham for petition signature collection.

In an interview at the hearing for S.132, the New Columbia Admission Act, Smith told an interviewer at The Atlantic that “as Americans, under no conditions should issues of political convenience or expedience dictate fundamental rights. The fact that [D.C. statehood] might prove politically inconvenient for either party is not a just reason for continuing to deny citizens those rights.”

A mid-October poll conducted by local NPR affiliate WAMU and the Washington City Paper showed Smith tied for second place with Lorie Masters and Paul Zukerberg behind Karl Racine, although a large plurality remained undecided. According to the City Paper, Smith's campaign tried to persuade two of his rivals, Lorie Masters and Paul Zukerberg, to drop out of the race in order to “[consolidate] the anti-Racine vote,” but both rivals declined.

=== Endorsements ===
- Metropolitan Washington Council AFL-CIO
- Jews United for Justice, a progressive Jewish nonprofit
- D.C. Police Union
- D.C. Working Families
- Gertrude Stein Democratic Club, an association of LGBT Democrats
- Service Employees International Union Local 32BJ

=== Result ===
Smith came second in the election for attorney general, polling 21.12% of the vote. The winner, Karl Racine, polled 40.65%.
