= Caroline Van Zile =

American lawyer and politician

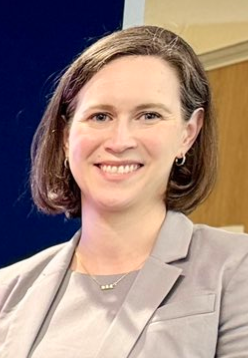
- Van Zile in 2024

3rd Solicitor General of the District of Columbia
- Incumbent
- Assumed office March 2022; Acting: February 8, 2022 - March 2022
- Attorney General: Karl Racine; Brian Schwalb
- Preceded by: Loren AliKhan

Personal details
- Born: Washington, D.C., U.S.
- Party: Democratic
- Education: Yale University (BA, JD); Pace University (MS)

Caroline S. Van Zile is an American lawyer who has served as the third solicitor general of the District of Columbia since 2022. She was the principal deputy solicitor general from 2020 to 2022.

== Early life and education ==
Van Zile was born and raised in Ward 1 of the District of Columbia. Her mother was a public school teacher and her father worked for the Washington, D.C., office of the corporation counsel. She graduated from Phillips Academy in 2002. Van Zile completed a B.A., summa cum laude, from Yale College. In 2006, she joined Teach For America in New York and obtained an M.S. in teaching from Pace University. In 2012, she completed a J.D. from Yale Law School.

== Career ==
From 2012 to 2013, Van Zile served as a law clerk for then-judge Brett Kavanaugh on the United States Court of Appeals for the District of Columbia Circuit. The following year, she clerked for judge James Boasberg on the United States District Court for the District of Columbia. From 2014 to 2015, she clerked for Justice Anthony Kennedy on the Supreme Court of the United States. She later worked on legal issues for cases in appellate and trial courts at Skadden, Arps, Slate, Meagher & Flom. She maintained a pro bono practice there, litigating cases involving civil rights, criminal justice, and reproductive rights.

In 2018, Van Zile joined the District of Columbia Office of the Attorney General (OAG). In 2020, she became its principal deputy solicitor general. She was promoted to acting solicitor general in February 2022. In March 2022, attorney general Karl Racine, named Van Zile the third solicitor general, succeeding Loren AliKhan. She leads all appellate litigation for OAG. She also manages a team of attorneys that handles over 400 pending appeals each year in the D.C. Court of Appeals, the U.S. Court of Appeals for the D.C. Circuit, and the U.S. Supreme Court. Van Zile is a member of the Democratic Party.

Van Zile is an elected member of the American Law Institute.

== Personal life ==
Van Zile was engaged in September 2015. Brett Kavanaugh officiated Van Zile's wedding the following year.

== See also ==
- List of law clerks for the first seat of the Supreme Court of the United States
