= Loren AliKhan =

American federal judge (born 1983)

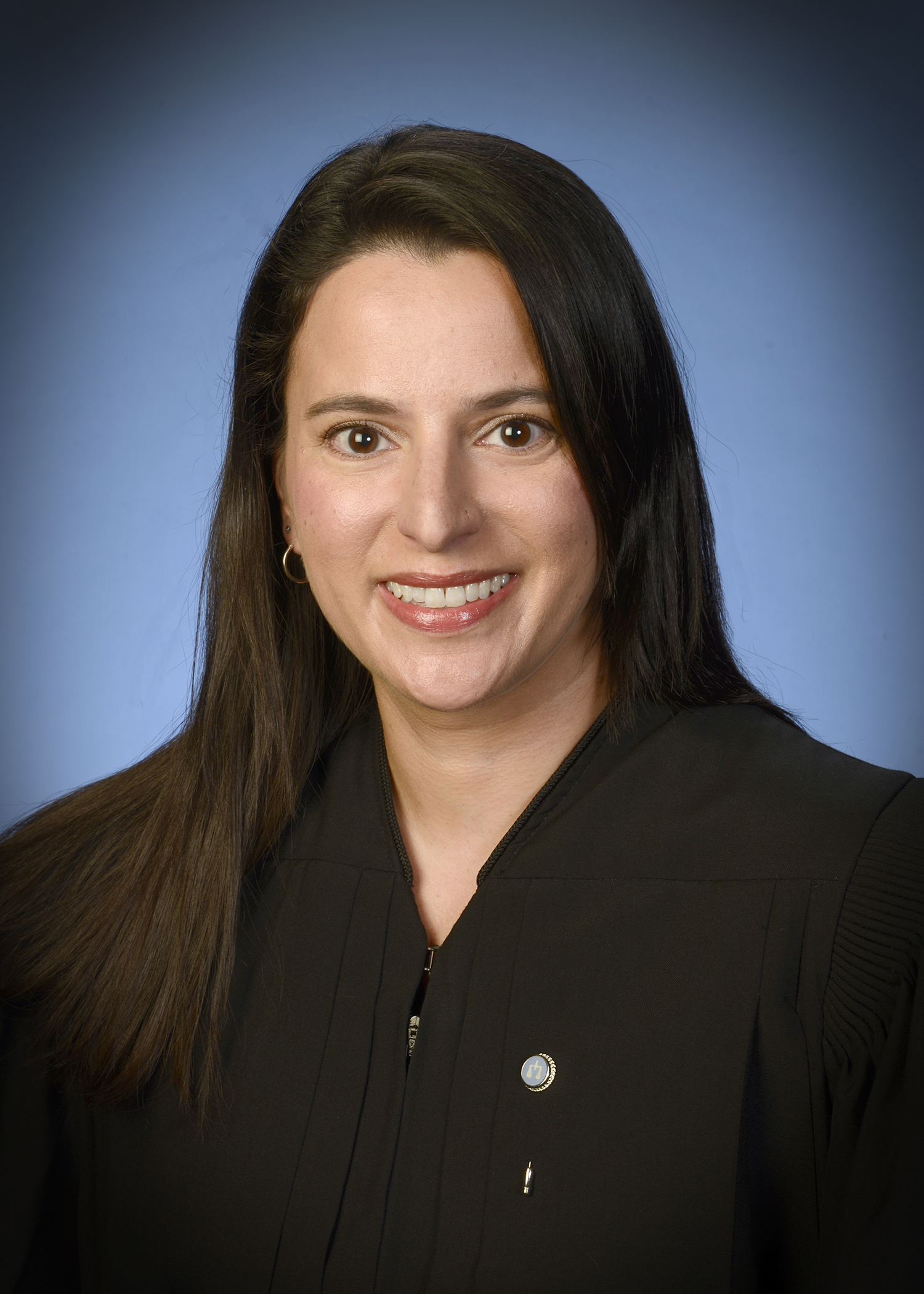

Judge of the United States District Court for the District of Columbia
- Incumbent
- Assumed office December 13, 2023
- Appointed by: Joe Biden
- Preceded by: Amy Berman Jackson

Associate Judge of the District of Columbia Court of Appeals
- In office February 18, 2022 – December 13, 2023
- Appointed by: Joe Biden
- Preceded by: John R. Fisher
- Succeeded by: Stuart G. Nash

2nd Solicitor General of the District of Columbia
- In office March 1, 2018 – February 8, 2022
- Mayor: Muriel Bowser
- Preceded by: Todd Kim
- Succeeded by: Caroline Van Zile

Personal details
- Born: 1983 (age 42–43) Baltimore County, Maryland, U.S.
- Education: Bard College at Simon's Rock (BA); Georgetown University (JD)

Loren Linn AliKhan (born 1983) is an American lawyer and jurist who has served as a United States district judge of the United States District Court for the District of Columbia since 2023. She previously served as a judge of the District of Columbia Court of Appeals from 2022 to 2023 and as the solicitor general of the District of Columbia from 2018 to 2022.

== Early life and education ==
AliKhan was born in 1983 in Baltimore County, Maryland to parents of Pakistani descent. She graduated from Bard College at Simon's Rock in 2003 with a Bachelor of Arts, summa cum laude, in social studies. She then attended Georgetown University Law Center, where she was an editor of the Georgetown Law Journal. She graduated in 2006 with a J.D., magna cum laude, and Order of the Coif membership.

== Legal career ==
After graduating from law school, AliKhan was a law clerk for judge Louis H. Pollak of the United States District Court for the Eastern District of Pennsylvania from 2006 to 2007 and for judge Thomas L. Ambro of the United States Court of Appeals for the Third Circuit from 2007 to 2008. She was then a Bristow Fellow in the Office of the Solicitor General of the United States before joining the Washington, D.C. office of O'Melveny & Myers. In 2013, AliKhan joined the Office of the District of Columbia Attorney General as a Deputy Solicitor General. In that role, she represented the District of Columbia's interests in appellate litigation before the District of Columbia Court of Appeals, United States Court of Appeals for the District of Columbia Circuit, Supreme Court of the United States, and other appellate tribunals.

On March 1, 2018, D.C. Attorney General Karl Racine appointed AliKhan as the District's second solicitor general, succeeding Todd Kim.

== Judicial career ==
=== D.C. court of appeals service ===
On September 30, 2021, President Joe Biden nominated AliKhan to serve as an associate judge for the District of Columbia Court of Appeals. President Biden nominated AliKhan to the seat vacated by Judge John R. Fisher, who retired on August 22, 2020. On December 2, 2021, a hearing on her nomination was held before the Senate Homeland Security and Governmental Affairs Committee. Her nomination was reported to the full Senate on December 15, 2021. On February 2, 2022, the Senate invoked cloture on her nomination by a 55–40 vote. On February 8, 2022, her nomination was confirmed by a 55–41 vote. She was sworn in by Chief Judge Anna Blackburne-Rigsby on February 18, 2022. Her service was terminated on December 13, 2023 when she was elevated to the U.S. District Court.

=== Federal judicial service ===
On May 3, 2023, President Joe Biden announced his intent to nominate AliKhan to serve as a United States district judge of the United States District Court for the District of Columbia. On May 4, 2023, her nomination was sent to the Senate. President Biden nominated AliKhan to the seat vacated by Judge Amy Berman Jackson, who assumed senior status on May 1, 2023. On June 7, 2023, a hearing on her nomination was held before the Senate Judiciary Committee. During her confirmation hearing, she was repeatedly questioned by Senator John Kennedy over her refusal to give her stance on affirmative action, abortion rights, and other issues. On July 13, 2023, her nomination was reported out of committee by an 11–10 vote. On December 5, 2023, the United States Senate invoked cloture on her nomination by a 51–50 vote, with Vice President Kamala Harris voting in the affirmative. This vote was notable as it made history with Harris becoming the vice president with the most tie-breaking Senate votes in history. Later that day, her nomination was confirmed by a 51–50 vote, with Vice President Harris voting in the affirmative. She received her judicial commission on December 13, 2023. She is the first female South Asian American federal judge to serve on the District of Columbia District Court.

==== Notable rulings ====
Just hours before a federal grant freeze ordered by the Trump Administration's Office of Management and Budget was set to take effect, AliKhan issued an administrative stay, temporarily halting the order. Almost a week later, on February 3, 2025, AliKhan granted a temporary restraining order, directing the OMB to notify all federal agencies that it will cease enforcement of the freeze order and disburse any paused grant funds. AliKhan issued a preliminary injunction three weeks later, blocking the grant freeze indefinitely as the case continued to be litigated.

== See also ==
- List of Asian American jurists

Legal offices
Preceded by Todd Kim	Solicitor General of the District of Columbia; 2018–2022	Succeeded by Caroline Van Zile
Preceded by John R. Fisher	Associate Judge of the District of Columbia Court of Appeals; 2022–2023	Succeeded by Stuart G. Nash
Preceded by Amy Berman Jackson	Judge of the United States District Court for the District of Columbia; 2023–present	Incumbent
