= 2026 District of Columbia Attorney General election =

- November 3, 2026
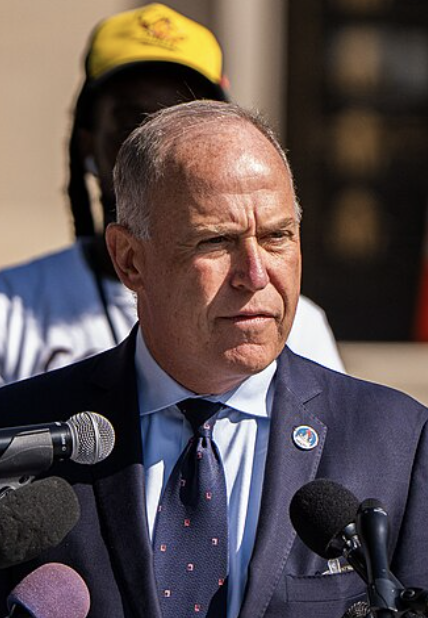

Candidate	Brian Schwalb	Manuel Rivera
Party	Democratic	Republican
Popular vote	175,980	13,128
Percentage	92.4%	6.9%
Attorney General before election
Brian Schwalb
Democratic
Elected Attorney General
Brian Schwalb
Democratic

The 2026 District of Columbia Attorney General election was held on November 3, 2026, to elect the Attorney General for the District of Columbia to a four-year term. Primary elections were held on June 16. Incumbent Democratic attorney general Brian Schwalb was re-elected for a second term against Republican challenger Manuel Rivera.

In the Democratic primary, Schwalb faced a minor challenge from Advisory Neighborhood Commission member J.P. Szymkowicz. Meanwhile, Rivera went unchallenged in the Republican primary. The DC Statehood Green Party held a primary; but did not nominate a candidate to the general election.

== Democratic primary ==
=== Candidates ===
==== Nominee ====
- Brian Schwalb, incumbent attorney general

==== Eliminated in primary ====
- J.P. Szymkowicz, ANC member for district 3D

=== Endorsements ===
Brian Schwalb

Organizations

- Sierra Club

=== Debate ===
2026 District of Columbia Attorney General Democratic primary debate
No.	Date	Host	Moderator	Link	Democratic	Democratic
Key: P Participant A Absent N Not invited I Invited W Withdrawn						
Key: P Participant A Absent N Not invited I Invited W Withdrawn					Brian Schwalb	J.P. Szymkowicz
1	Apr. 29, 2026	District of Columbia Board of Elections	LaJoy Johnson-Law	YouTube	P	P

=== Results ===
Results by precinct Schwalb: 70–80%; 80–90%; 90–100%

Democratic primary
Party	Candidate	Votes	%
Democratic	Brian Schwalb (incumbent)	115,909	90.63
Democratic	J.P. Szymkowicz	11,381	8.90
Write-in		605	0.47
Total votes		127,895	100.00

== Republican primary ==
=== Candidates ===
==== Nominee ====
- Manuel Rivera

=== Results ===
Republican primary
Party	Candidate	Votes	%
Republican	Manuel Rivera	2,530	92.17
Write-in		215	7.83
Total votes		2,745	100.00

== Statehood Green primary ==
=== Results ===
Statehood Green primary
Party	Candidate	Votes	%
	Write-in	290	100.00
Total votes		290	100.00

== General election ==
=== Results ===
2026 District of Columbia Attorney General election
Party	Candidate	Votes	%
Democratic	Brian Schwalb (incumbent)	175,980	92.41
Republican	Manuel Rivera	13,128	6.89
Write-in		1,324	0.70
Total votes		190,432	100.00
