= 2018 District of Columbia Attorney General election =

- November 6, 2018
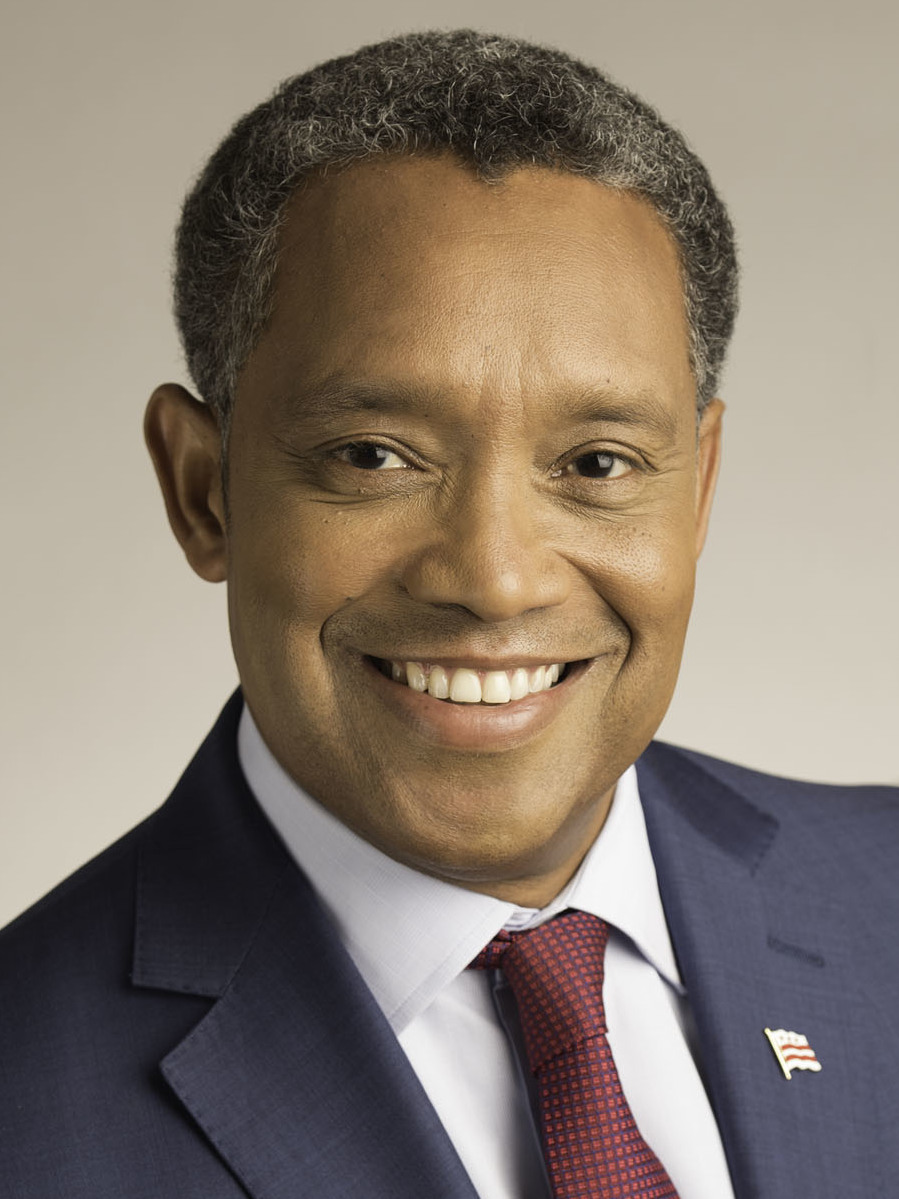

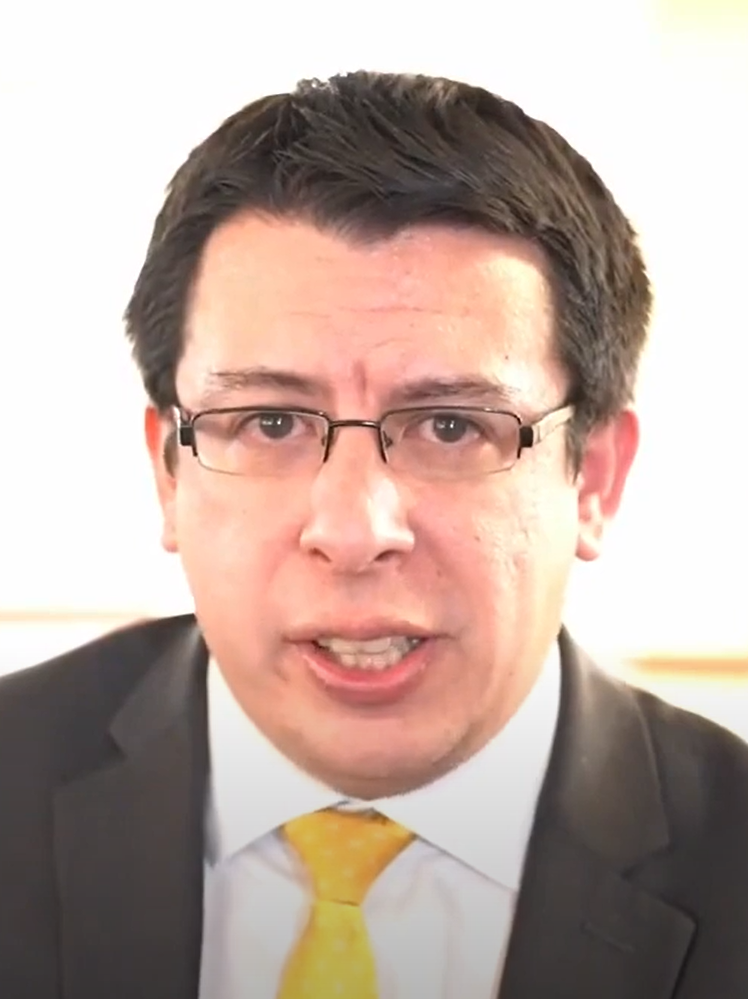
Candidate	Karl Racine	Joe Bishop-Henchman
Party	Democratic	Libertarian
Popular vote	207,451	14,941
Percentage	92.77%	6.68%
- Racine: 80–90% >90%
Attorney General before election
Karl Racine
Democratic
Elected Attorney General
Karl Racine
Democratic

The 2018 District of Columbia Attorney General election was held on November 6, 2018, to elect the Attorney General of Washington, D.C. This was the second ever Attorney General election in D.C. history.

Incumbent Attorney General Democrat Karl Racine handily won re-election.

== Results ==
2018 District of Columbia Attorney General election
Party	Candidate	Votes	%
Democratic	Karl Racine (incumbent)	207,451	92.77
Libertarian	Joe Bishop-Henchman	14,941	6.68
Write-in		1,233	0.55
Total votes		223,625	100%
Democratic hold			
