= DCAG =

DCAG may refer to:

- Attorney General for the District of Columbia, in Washington, DC
- Deputy Air Wing Commander, of a United States Navy carrier air wing
