= L. Scooter Morris =

American painter

- Born: Pittsburgh, Pennsylvania, U.S.

L. Scooter Morris is an American painter and fabric designer. Working in a self-defined medium known as “Sculpted Paintings,". Morris’ work focuses on themes inspired by current events in politics, landscapes, and an examination of Americana.

== Early life and education ==
L. Scooter Morris was born in Pittsburgh, Pennsylvania. As a child, she was drawn to the visual arts by the city's various art programs and regular school trips to the Carnegie Museum of Art.

Morris attended Temple University (TU) in the Tyler School of Art and Architecture, then moved to Rome, Italy. Returning to the United States, Morris attended the University of Southern California, where she attained a Bachelor of Fine Arts and performed post-graduate work at UCLA.

== Career and sculpted paintings ==
Morris' uses an artistic style called "Sculpted Paintings". She has produced landscape works such as "September", "We Are the People" and the triptych "Places I Remember."

Eventually, Morris adapted the Sculpted Painting style to begin a series based on variations and rearrangements of the American flag, with The Christian Century including "The United States of Gun" in their August 1, 2018 issue.

Morris’s work also explores the themes of justice and equality.

== Tipping Point ==
In 2025, to coincide with the Morris' Santa Fe solo-show We Are the People, she created a short film to accompany the exhibition, which combines still images from the show's pieces along with spoken narrative by Morris herself.

Year	Award	Category	Result
2025	Indie Cine Tube Awards, Season 15	Best Short Films (Less than 40 minutes)	Won
2025	Spring Film Festival of Kerala	Best Social Awareness Film	Won
2025	24 Hours Film Challenge	Best Message	Nominated
2025	24 Hours Film Challenge	Best Experimental Film	Nominated
2025	Celluloid Dreams International Film Festival	Best Short Film	Nominated
2025	Pageant Film Festival	Best Poem	Nominated
2025	Atlanta Movie Awards	Best Experimental Short	Nominated
2025	Washington Film Awards	Best Micro Film	Won
2025	Rome International Short Festival	Micro Short	Won
2025	Denver Movie Awards	Best First Time Filmmaker Short	Won
2026	Chicago Filmmaker Awards	Best Experimental Film	Won
2026	Florence Indie Film Festival	Best Micro Short	Won
2026	Everybody is Somebody: Albuquerque Film Festival	Best Script	Won

== Exhibitions ==
- Exchange Rate, Santa Fe Community Gallery, Santa Fe (2025)
- Red Dot, Art Basel, Miami (2024)
- Packard Group National Exhibition, No. 7 Center Gallery, Vermillion (2022)
- Double Sided, East Village Art Collection, New York City (2022)
- Objects of Art, El Museo Cultural de Santa Fe, Santa Fe (2022)
- Rituals of Resistance, The Urban Collective, New Haven (2020)
- Happy Little Clouds, City of Santa Fe Arts Commission Community Gallery, Santa Fe (2017)
- Exhibitionism, Saatchi Gallery, Paris (2016)
- Treading on My Dreams (solo), Wiford Gallery, Santa Fe (2015)

== Notable works ==
- "The Lamp", purchased by D.C. Attorney General (Former) Karl Racine
- "September", featured on the cover of the June 8, 2022 issue of the New Mexico Bar Bulletin
- “United States of Gun”, featured by American Eagle Outfitters at Times Square
- “Just Another Day”, showing in Albuquerque City Hall
- “Dude Where's My Flag: Read Between The Lines”, showing at First National Bank, Santa Fe Plaza

== Including work by Morris ==
- Art Ideal, 2025. Issue 5, published by Circle Foundation for the Arts.
- Art Legends of Our Time, 2025. Issue 2, published by Contemporary Art Curator Magazine.

== Awards ==
- Future of Art: Global Masterpiece Award, win (2025)
- Contemporary Art Curator Magazine: Art Legends of Our Time (2025)
- Circle Foundation of the Arts: Creative Excellence Award (2025)
- Best Art Awards: Nature/Landscape, honorable mention, for "The Sky is Everything" (2024)
