= Sanford Capital =

Property management company

Sanford Capital is a property management company based in Bethesda, Maryland. The company received severe criticism from tenants and regulators before agreeing to exit the property management business in Washington DC.

== History ==
Patrick B. Strauss and Aubrey Carter Nowell founded Sanford Capital in 2005. At its peak, Sanford owned more than 65 rental properties, all in the DC area. At least 330 of the company's residents received public housing vouchers, meaning Sanford received at least $3.7 million per year in taxpayer money.

== Resident complaints ==
Residents of Sanford's buildings complained about multiple problems related to shoddy maintenance. Some of the highest-profile complaints related to raw sewage spreading through buildings. According to one media account, "Feces coagulated like cooled lava along the bathroom walls, and debris-laden brown liquid filled the bathtub and spilled out the bathroom door." Other residents complained about rodent infestations, broken heating systems, non-functioning locks, squatters, blocked drains, broken lighting fixtures, damaged floors, leaky faucets, and broken smoke detectors. In response to resident feedback, Mayor Muriel Bowser ordered a government review of all properties owned by Sanford Capital in 2017.

== Legal action ==
The Bowser review resulted in 1,083 violations being discovered by city inspectors, who issued $539,500 in fines to Sanford. The nonprofit Equal Rights Center sued Sanford Capital in mid-2017, alleging that Sanford discriminated against veterans and other groups.

DC Attorney General Karl Racine filed multiple lawsuits against Sanford Capital.

In April 2018, Sanford entered into a consent decree with the District in which the company agreed to stop acting as a landlord in Washington DC within six months.

In November 2019, Sanford Capital and its owner settled with the Attorney General, agreeing to pay $1.1 million in rent recovery to 155 residents in three of its apartment complexes.
