= Paul Zukerberg =

American activist, lawyer and politician

Personal details
- Born: Paul H. Zukerberg; November 20, 1957 (age 68) Paterson, New Jersey, U.S.
- Party: Democratic
- Children: 2
- Education: Hamilton College; American University (JD)

Paul H. Zukerberg (born November 20, 1957) is an American activist, lawyer, and politician. Through a series of lawsuits and appeals, Zukerberg successfully ensured the direct election of the Attorney General of the District of Columbia in 2014 after the Council of the District of Columbia and incumbent Irv Nathan sought to postpone the vote.

== Career ==
Zukerberg is the son of a self-taught musician who played at bar mitzvahs and weddings from Paterson, New Jersey. He graduated from Hamilton College, moved to Washington, DC to attend law school at American University, and received his JD in 1985. He became a criminal defense lawyer because he likes going to trial and he "just can't stand when someone gets the raw end of the deal." He currently lives in Adams Morgan with two children and is a founding parent of the EL Haynes Public Charter School. In 2016, Zukerberg founded Zukerberg & Halperin, a personal injury law firm with offices in Washington, DC and Richmond, Virginia.

On May 29, 2025, Zukerberg was indefinitely suspended from the practice of law in the District of Columbia on the grounds of disability.

== Campaign for DC Council ==
In April 2012, Zukerberg declared his candidacy for a special election to the at-large seat on the DC Council with a pro-marijuana platform. According to Zukerberg, in 2011, DC was first in pot arrests with a record number that year. His council candidacy raised awareness about the importance of marijuana decriminalization in Washington, DC.

One of Zukerberg's opponents, Elissa Silverman, unsuccessfully sought to have him disqualified by challenging the validity of his signatures. Zukerberg launched and paid for an outside firm to investigate the list of DC registered voters. Zukerberg said he discovered that the District of Columbia Board of Elections has not been properly updating its rolls, including failing to process 66,000 change-of-address forms.

In the special election, held on April 23, 2013, Zukerberg came fifth out of eight candidates, receiving 1,195 votes (2.09%).

== Fight for an Elected Attorney General ==
In 2010, 90,316 District residents voted "overwhelmingly" to put D.C.'s first elected attorney general on the ballot in 2014.

In July 2012, the DC council voted to postpone the election of attorney general to 2018. Council Chairman Phil Mendelson called the vote "an embarrassment." In September 2013, Zukerberg filed suit against the DC Council and the city elections claiming any delay would violate the District charter — which was amended through the 2010 ballot question to provide for the Attorney General election. Attorney General Irvin B. Nathan initially argued that Zukerberg was not suffering any "meaningful hardship" from pushing back the election. In November 2013, Zukerberg announced his candidacy for Attorney General and argued that he would suffer irreparable harm if it did not occur.

On February 7, 2014, a District of Columbia judge ruled that ballots for the April 1 primary could be printed without the Attorney General race. Zukerberg appealed the ruling.

On June 4, 2014, the Court of Appeals overturned the lower court's decision. According to the ruling, the Court of Appeals "[determined] that the Superior Court's interpretation was incorrect as a matter of law and reverse." They stated in the ruling that original language in Elected Attorney General Act is ambiguous in stating the election "shall be after January 1, 2014," and that the attorney general referendum that was ratified by a majority of D.C. voters last year made it seem as though the election would take place in 2014. On June 13, Zukerberg collected nominating petitions.

== Campaign for Attorney General ==
Zukerberg has said he would better represent the public interest than previous Attorneys General, support decriminalization of marijuana, and increase the ease with which nonviolent criminal records are expunged to promote restorative justice. He was endorsed by the Washington Teachers' Union, D.C. Councilmember Tommy Wells, the operator of D.C. Urban Moms & Dads, and the Washington City Paper.

According to a September 2014 Washington Post poll, Zukerberg led the field of Attorney General candidates, with a 7 to 9 point advantage over each of his four competitors, Lorie Masters, Edward "Smitty" Smith, Karl Racine, and Lateefah Williams. However, the poll also found that 57% of the electorate was undecided.

Zukerberg finished fourth behind Karl Racine, who won with 37% of the vote.
