= Andrea L. Hertzfeld =

American judge (born 1979)

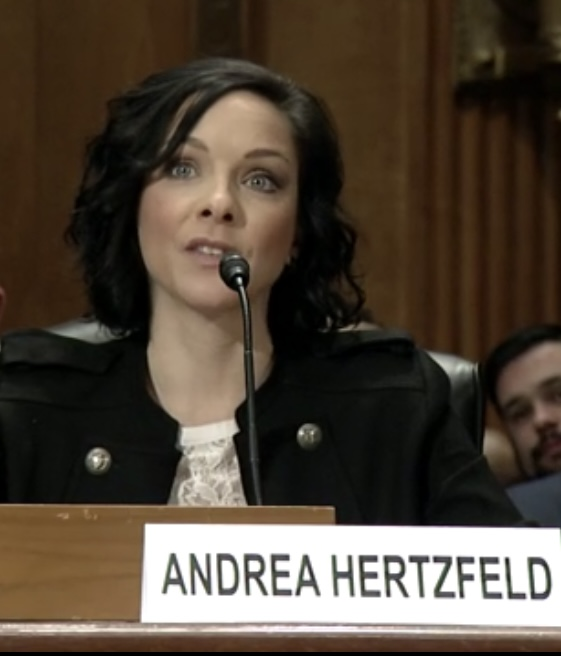

Associate Judge of the Superior Court of the District of Columbia
- Incumbent
- Assumed office November 2019
- President: Donald Trump
- Preceded by: Stuart G. Nash

Personal details
- Born: July 27, 1979 (age 46) Waterville, Ohio, U.S.
- Education: Bowling Green State University (BA); Harvard University (JD)

Andrea Lynn Hertzfeld (born July 27, 1979) is an associate judge of the Superior Court of the District of Columbia.

== Education and career ==
Hertzfeld earned her Bachelor of Arts from Bowling Green State University and her Juris Doctor from Harvard Law School.

She worked in the U.S. Attorney's Office in the District of Columbia later became an assistant United States attorney.

=== D.C. Superior court ===
President Donald Trump nominated Hertzfeld on May 6, 2019, to a 15-year term as an associate judge on the Superior Court of the District of Columbia. She was nominated to the seat vacated by Stuart G. Nash. On October 22, 2019, the Senate Committee on Homeland Security and Governmental Affairs held a hearing on her nomination. The Senate confirmed her nomination on November 21, 2019, by voice vote.

In 2023, Hertzfeld was criticized by D.C. Mayor Muriel Bowser for allowing a 15-year-old facing robbery and theft charges to be released home instead of holding the teen in a secure facility. The teen was allegedly involved in a fatal carjacking days later. Hertzfeld said that there was not enough room in youth shelter housing to hold the suspect and criticized the Department of Youth Rehabilitation Services. A Superior Court spokesman also placed partial responsibility on the D.C. Attorney General. While criticizing Hertzfeld, Bowser erroneously stated that the teen had been arrested 6 or 7 times for carjacking previously. The teen instead had 12 previous charges of robbery as well as charges of weapons possession, destruction of property and receiving stolen property.
