= Elizabeth Cavendish =

Elizabeth Cavendish may refer to:

- Elizabeth Cavendish, later Elizabeth Stuart, Countess of Lennox
- Bess of Hardwick (1527–1608), Elizabethan courtier, married to Sir William Cavendish
- Elizabeth Cavendish, Duchess of Devonshire (1759–1824), wife of the fifth Duke of Devonshire
- Elizabeth Cavendish (lawyer), executive director of Appleseed Foundation
- Elizabeth Cavendish, Countess of Bridgewater (1626–1663), writer
- Elizabeth Cavendish, Countess of Devonshire (1619–1689)
- Lady Elizabeth Cavendish (1926–2018) courtier
