= Dayna Bowen Matthew =

American legal scholar and academic administrator

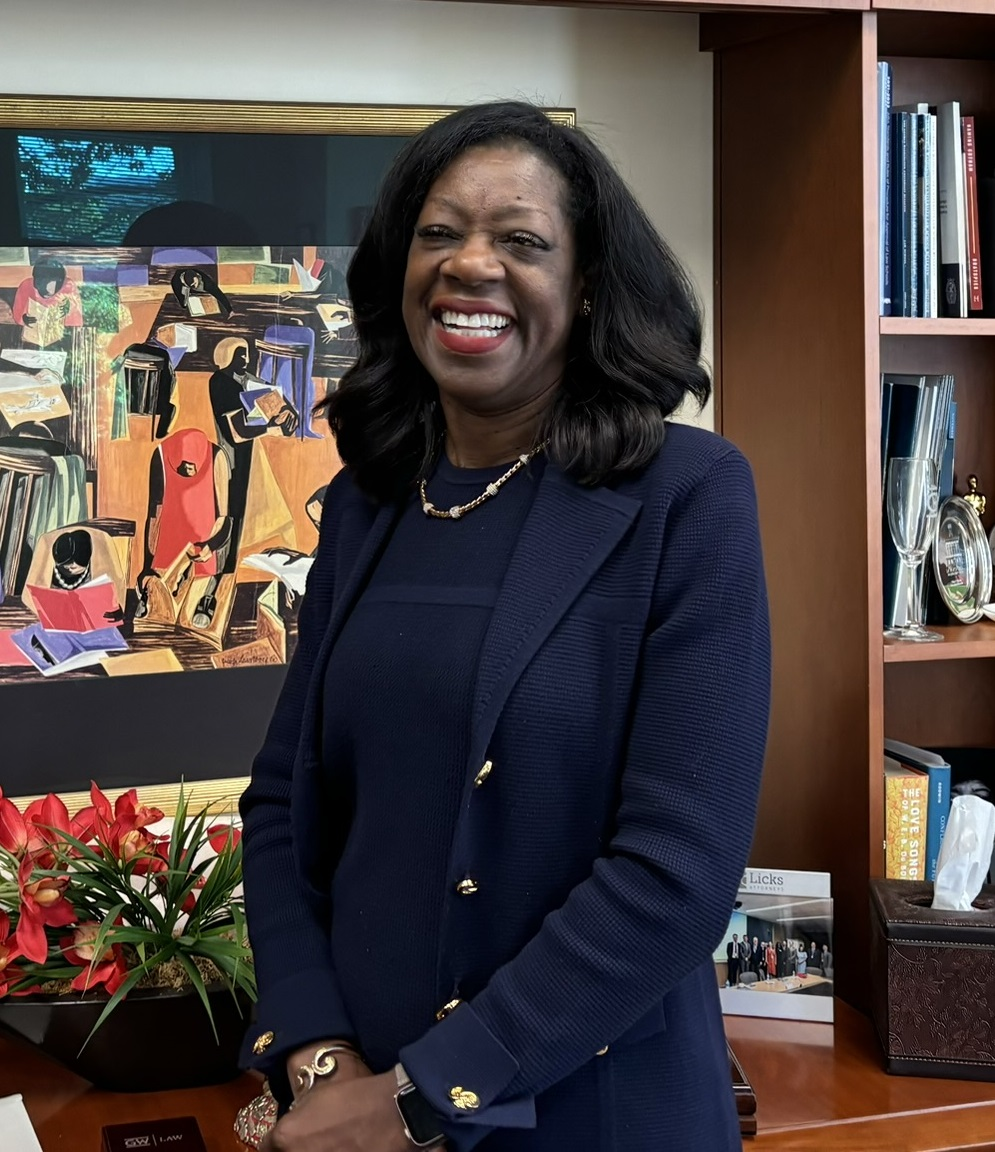

Dean of the George Washington University Law School
- Incumbent
- Assumed office July 2020
- Preceded by: Blake Morant

Personal details
- Education: Harvard University (BA); University of Virginia (JD); University of Colorado Denver (PhD)

Dayna Bowen Matthew is an American legal scholar, author, and academic administrator currently serving as dean and Harold H. Greene Professor of Law at the George Washington University Law School. Her legal scholarship has focused primarily on racial disparities in healthcare and civil rights law.

== Early life, education, and career ==
Born in New York City to Vincent E. and Marion Bowen, Matthew was raised in the South Bronx during the turbulent 1960s and 1970s. She received an A.B. degree in economics from Harvard-Radcliffe College, followed by a J.D. from the University of Virginia School of Law (UVA Law), where she became an editor of the Virginia Law Review, and a winner of the William Minor Lile Moot Court Competition. In 1987, Matthew was the first black student to be accepted to the Virginia Law Review in the history of the publication, based on having authored an exceptional article about euthanasia. Matthew lamented that shortly thereafter the law review adopted an affirmative action plan to give minority students an additional pathway to gain acceptance to the law review, asserting that while affirmative action was necessary where black students were denied equal opportunities to compete, those who had been admitted to the law school "have the talent to make a merit-based situation work". Columnist William Raspberry wrote in support of Matthew's position. Matthew has since addressed affirmative action efforts on numerous occasions, developing expertise in the topic and discussing both the benefits of well-designed policies and the practical and constitutional limitations of policies that are not well-designed.

Following her graduation, she was a law clerk for Judge John Charles Thomas of the Supreme Court of Virginia.

The deaths of her parents at relatively young ages—her father at 49 and her mother at 61—eventually informed Matthew's research into the effects of unequal access to the social determinants of health.

== Teaching career ==
After working in private practice for three years with the law firm of McGuire, Woods, Battle & Boothe (now McGuireWoods), from 1988 to 1991, Matthew began her teaching career as an assistant professor at UVA Law, from 1991 to 1994. She then worked at the Kentucky law firm of Greenbaum, Doll & McDonald from 1996 to 1998 before returning to teaching law, at the University of Kentucky, where she was the Gallion & Baker Professor of Law & Medicine from 1999 to 2002. In July 1997, she was appointed to a four-year terms on the Kentucky Registry of Election Finance.

From 2003 to 2017, she taught at the University of Colorado Law School, beginning as an associate professor in 2003 and becoming a full professor in 2005. In 2004, she served as associate dean of academic affairs, and was later vice dean, from 2010 to 2011. Additionally, she was a member of the Center for Bioethics and Humanities on the Anschutz Medical Campus and held a joint appointment at the Colorado School of Public Health. She co-founded the Colorado Health Equity Project in 2013, aimed at "removing barriers to good health for low income individuals by providing legal representation, research, and policy advocacy". In 2015, Matthew held an eight-month appointment as "senior adviser to the director of the Office of Civil Rights for the Environmental Protection Agency", and was also a Robert Wood Johnson Health Policy Fellow from 2015 to 2016, working in that capacity with Senator Debbie Stabenow.

During this time, Matthew also became a nonresident fellow at the Brookings Institution, which position she continues to hold as of 2024. In June 2017, it was announced that Matthew would return to UVA Law as a full professor that fall, holding the title of William L. Matheson and Robert M. Morgenthau Distinguished Professor of Law. She also received a Ph.D. in health and behavioral sciences from the University of Colorado Denver, in 2018.

Also in 2018, Matthew was the lead investigator on a $25,000 grant from the Lumina Foundation to develop workshops to help UVA undergraduates "connect with and help Charlottesville residents to address longstanding inequalities", in the aftermath of the Unite the Right rally in that city. Matthew noted that the institution "had to grapple with the fact that graduates of the University of Virginia are leaders of the alt-right movement", due to the involvement of UVA alumni Richard B. Spencer and Jason Kessler. Matthew also co-founded the UVA Equity Center at the University of Virginia in 2019.

== Deanship ==
In February 2020, it was announced that Matthew had been named dean of the George Washington University School of Law, succeeding Dean Blake Morant. In the fall of 2021, Matthew was additionally formally installed as the Harold H. Greene Professor of Law. As dean, Matthew articulated a three-pronged agenda focused on enhancing the school's reputation, increasing funding for professorships and scholarships, and strengthening community connections within GW Law. In 2021, Matthew launched the Equity Institute Initiative at GW, which ultimately established the George Washington University Institute for Racial, Ethnic and Socioeconomic Equity, with Matthews serving as the institute's inaugural faculty director while a search was conducted to hire an executive director. In November 2023, Matthew announced the expansion of GW Law's health law offerings into "a fully-fledged Health Law and Policy Program", supported by a substantial donation to the institution, adding new faculty members, course offerings, and clinical opportunities.

In addition to focusing on growth and development within the law school, Dean Matthew also addressed significant developments arising from outside the institution. In March 2022, Matthew organized a letter of support by black law school deans for the nomination of Ketanji Brown Jackson to the Supreme Court of the United States. In April 2022, she moderated a candidate's debate held at GW in the 2022 District of Columbia Attorney General election. Later that same year, Matthew defended Supreme Court Justice Clarence Thomas, who had taught a constitutional law seminar at the school for the preceding decade, against a student petition to fire Thomas, in the wake of the decision in Dobbs v. Jackson Women's Health Organization. In addition to joining in the opinion overturning Roe v. Wade and removing the constitutional right to abortion, Thomas wrote a concurring opinion suggesting that the court should also reconsider its prior decisions upholding rights to contraception and same-sex marriage. Matthew and Provost Christopher Bracey responded with an email that "while disavowing Thomas' views, wrote that the university honors 'academic freedom and freedom of expression and inquiry'". Thomas later independently decided to withdraw from teaching the course. In April 2024, during a period of pro-Palestinian protests on the GW Law campus in the proximity of the law school building, Matthew announced the relocation of final exams, stressing that while the law students were not in danger, ensuring their ability to concentrate during exams was a priority.

In 2024, the American Council on Education named Matthew as one of its "26 emerging college and university leaders for the 2024-25 class of the ACE Fellows Program". She is also an elected member of the American Law Institute and of the National Academy of Medicine.

== Publications ==
Matthew has published "numerous articles and book chapters on health and antitrust law topics", as well as two books, Just Medicine: A Cure for Racial Inequality in American Health Care, in 2015, and Just Health: Treating Structural Racism to Heal America, in 2022.

Just Medicine examined "how implicit bias affects health outcomes". Just Medicine was reviewed for the Law and Politics Book Review as "a descriptive and explanatory account that intersects neuroscience, social science and the law", which "extends the discourse beyond access and affordability to include a salient but frequently overlooked factor in the poor health outcomes of minority patients: unconscious racism, also known as implicit bias". The review found that Matthew's "combination of neuroscience, social science, and legal research provides cogent evidence to advance the main arguments", concluding that it "provides a conceptual and theoretical model that should be utilized for empirical tests of implicit bias in healthcare". Political Science Quarterly described the book as "necessary reading for all who envision a society in which health equity is a moral imperative".

Just Health further examined the legal structures influencing social determinants of health. A review in Family Medicine, the journal of the Society of Teachers of Family Medicine, described it as "a comprehensive look at the legal decisions that create and maintain these factors".

In 2024, Matthew served as an advisor on the Restatement (Third) of Torts: Concluding Provisions.

== Personal life ==
Matthew is married to Dr. Thomas Matthew, former Director of Cardiothoracic Surgery at Johns Hopkins Suburban Hospital, with whom she has three children. At one time, she accompanied Dr. Matthew to Rwanda as a Fulbright Specialist.
