= Elizabeth Cavendish (lawyer) =

American lawyer

Elizabeth (Betsy) Cavendish
- Born: Elizabeth Cavendish; March 1960 (age 66); Upper Arlington, Ohio
- Citizenship: American
- Education: Yale University; Yale Law School
- Occupation: Lawyer
- Employers: Appleseed Foundation; NARAL Pro-Choice America
- Known for: President of the Appleseed Foundation; former president of NARAL Pro-Choice America
- Title: President, Appleseed Foundation
- Term: 2007–

Elizabeth (Betsy) Cavendish (born March 1960) is an American lawyer and general counsel for the Executive Office of the Mayor in Washington, D.C.

== Early life and education ==
Born in March 1960, Cavendish was raised in Upper Arlington, Ohio. She received her upper education from Yale University and Yale Law School.

== Career ==
Cavendish served as a law clerk to Judge Gerhard Gesell of the United States District Court for the District of Columbia, where she worked on cases including United States v. Oliver North. She later worked as an assistant professor of law at the University of Illinois College of Law.

Cavendish subsequently held roles in public service, including serving in the U.S. Department of Justice’s Office of Legal Counsel under Attorney General Janet Reno. She later served as general counsel to the Executive Office of the Mayor of the District of Columbia, advising city agencies and serving as ethics counsel.

She then served as legal director of NARAL Pro-Choice America. In May 2004, she succeeded Kate Michelman as interim president of the organization. Cavendish previously worked as legal director and staff member of the Office of Legal Counsel in the Justice Department under Attorney General Janet Reno.

In March 2007, Cavendish was named president of the Appleseed Foundation, a nonprofit network focused on public-interest legal reform.

== Nonprofit efforts ==
During her tenure as president of the Appleseed Foundation, Cavendish led a network of nonprofit centers focused on advancing social and economic justice through legal and policy reform, including work on issues such as financial access and systemic inequality.
