= Libertarian Party of the District of Columbia =

D.C. affiliate of the Libertarian Party

- Chairperson: Bruce Majors
- Founded: c. 1981 (reorganized 2012)
- Headquarters: 1200 23rd Street NW, Suite 711; Washington, DC 20037
- Membership (2022): 2,308
- Ideology: Libertarianism
- National affiliation: Libertarian Party
- Colors: blue, yellow

Website
- dc.libertarianparty.com

The Libertarian Party of the District of Columbia is a political party in the United States active in the District of Columbia. It is a recognized affiliate of the national Libertarian Party.

The Libertarian Party of the District of Columbia is dedicated to the same ideas represented by the national Libertarian Party but also focuses on issues specific to the District of Columbia such as "taxation without representation", home rule, and statehood.

As of July 31, 2022, there are 2,308 registered Libertarian voters in the District of Columbia.

== History ==
The Libertarian Party of the District of Columbia has existed since at least 1981.

=== 1986 election cycle ===
Scott Kohlhaas was the Libertarian Party candidate for an at-large seat on the Council of the District of Columbia in 1986. Kolhaas had worked in DC on an early unsuccessful education choice tax credit initiative, before DC had its opportunity vouchers or charter schools.

Kohlhaas came in fourth place with 2,261 votes, or one percent of the total vote. Kolhaas moved to Alaska, where he finished his undergraduate education and is active in the Alaska Libertarian Party as a candidate and activist.

=== 1988 election cycle ===
Dennis Sobin was the Libertarian Party candidate for an at-large seat on the Council of the District of Columbia in 1988. Sobin was an entrepreneur who published an adult magazine, an escort service, telephone party lines, and video stores. He campaigned to decriminalize prostitution and drugs. He said that drug addiction should be treated as a medical disease rather than as a crime. Sobin opposed a proposed law that would have prohibited minors from being inside certain clubs in late hours.

Prissy Williams-Godfrey was the Libertarian Party candidate for the Ward 2 seat on the Council. Williams-Godfrey was a prostitute and managed a brothel. Police arrested her, saying her campaign offices were actually brothels. Her name did not appear on general election ballots.

Sobin came in seventh place with 3,419 votes, or one percent of the total vote.

=== 1990 election cycle ===
Nancy Lord ran for Mayor of the District of Columbia as a Libertarian in 1990. Lord campaigned promising a ten-percent decrease in the number of employees of the Government of the District of Columbia. She wanted to end welfare payments within two years and she wanted to end rent control laws. She promised to end government regulations that she said strangle small businesses, such as the Boxing Commission and most of the Department of Consumer and Regulatory Affairs. Lord advocated for increasing property taxes on undeveloped parcels of land, and

Jacques Chevalier filed to run for chair of the District Council as a Libertarian, but he was not successful at securing a place on the general election ballot.

Lord came in third place with 951 votes, or one percent of the total vote.

=== 1994 election cycle ===
David W. Morris was elected Advisory Neighborhood Commissioner for Single Member District 2F04. Morris also served as the treasurer of the Libertarian Party of the District of Columbia.

=== 2000 election cycle ===
Robert D. Kampia ran as the Libertarian Party candidate for Delegate to the U.S. House of Representatives. Kampia had received a bachelor's degree in engineering science from Pennsylvania State University. He was the founder and executive director of the Marijuana Policy Project. Kampia campaigned to end the arrest of nonviolent drug users. He said the District's biggest problem was that half of black males ages 18 to 35 are incarcerated, on parole, or on probation because anti-drug legislation has displayed a racial bias. Kampia advocated for the District's full representation in the United States Congress. He said that District residents should be exempt from all federal taxes until the District receives full representation in Congress.

Matthew G. Mercurio ran as the Libertarian Party candidate for an at-large seat on the Council in 2000. Mercurio earned a bachelor's degree in economics and mathematics from Boston University and a master's degree and doctorate in economics from Princeton University, and he worked as a consulting economist. Mercurio campaigned to legalize medical marijuana use by people who are seriously ill.

Kampia came in third place, receiving 4,594 votes or three percent of the total vote.

Mercurio came in sixth place, receiving 5,771 votes, or two percent of the total vote.

=== 2008 election cycle ===
Damien Lincoln Ober ran as the Libertarian Party candidate for the District's shadow senator in 2008. Ober worked a bartender, and he was also a writer and a filmmaker.

When The Washington Post asked Ober about the most urgent issue facing the District, Ober said that Arlington and Alexandria should be returned to the District of Columbia, describing the retroceded land as the District's "phantom limb". When The Washington Post asked why voters should elect him, Ober said, "Anyone who can answer this in 25 words is surely using market-tested phrases in place of true discourse or new ideas about government and advocacy."

Ober came in fourth place with 5,915 votes or three percent of the total vote.

=== 2012 election cycle ===
In 2012, Bruce Majors ran as the Libertarian Party candidate for the Congressional delegate for the District of Columbia. In 2010, Majors told a reporter from The Washington Post that he was comfortable working with people who support the Tea Party movement because they have common goals with libertarians. On his blog, Majors posted advice to attendees of the 2010 Restoring Honor rally that attendees should avoid two Metrorail lines because they go through certain neighborhoods. He wrote that many parts of the District are safe, "but why chance it if you don't know where you are?"

During his 2012 campaign, Majors told a reporter from The Washington Post that he expected to lose. He said his goal was to receive at least 7,500 votes in order to secure major-party status for the Libertarian Party and make it far easier for its candidates to appear on the ballot. Majors came in second place with 16,524 votes, or six percent of the total vote. Because he ran as a Libertarian Party candidate and he received more than 7,500 votes, the Libertarian Party became a major party in the District through at least 2016.

=== 2014 election cycle ===
Bruce Majors ran as the Libertarian Party candidate for mayor of the District. In the general election, Majors came in fifth place with 1,297 votes, or one percent of the total vote.

Kyle Walker was the Libertarian Party candidate for chair of the Council. Walker came in fifth place with 3,674 votes, or two percent of the total vote.

Frederick Steiner was the Libertarian Party candidate for at-large member of the Council. A resident of Fort Totten, Steiner worked in information technology. Steiner came in fourteenth place with 3,766 votes, or one percent of the total vote.

John Vaught LaBeaume ran as the Libertarian Party candidate to represent Ward 1 on the Council. LaBeaume worked as the director of communications for Robert Sarvis, Libertarian candidate for Governor of Virginia. LaBeaume had also written and edited online content for the Washington Examiner. He came third place with 829 votes, or four percent of the total vote.

Ryan Sabot was the Libertarian Party candidate to represent Ward 3 on the Council. Sabot came in second place with 2,940 votes, or eleven percent of the vote.

Preston Cornish ran for the Ward 5 seat on the Council as a Libertarian. Born in the District and raised in Rockville, Maryland, he graduated from Furman University. A resident of Eckington, Cornish worked for Reason Foundation. Cornish campaigned to legalize marijuana and decriminalize other "low-risk" drugs. He wanted to restore ethical behavior on the District Council, and he favored developing the ward's land for residential and retail uses instead of industrial uses. Cornish came in second place and received 1,488 votes, or six percent of the total vote.

Libertarian Party member William Hanff ran as a write-in candidate in the general election for the Ward 5 seat on the Council. Hanff was an assistant professor of mass media at the University of the District of Columbia. In the general election, there were 199 votes for write-in candidates, or one percent of the total; the District of Columbia Board of Elections did not report how many of those votes were for Hanff.

Pranav Badhwar ran for the Ward 6 seat on the Council. A resident of Capitol Hill, Badhwar is originally from India, and he has also lived in Toronto and New York City before moving to the District in 2000. His campaign focused on job creation and the reducing business regulations in the District. He opposed increasing the District's minimum wage, saying that doing so would be detrimental to small businesses. He favored giving schools more autonomy to do as they see fit. In the general election, he came in second place, receiving 3,127 votes, ten percent of the total vote.

Sara Jane Panfil announced she would run for Libertarian Party candidate for Delegate to the United States House of Representatives. Although Panfil won the Libertarian Party primary election, she did not appear on the general election ballot.

John Daniel ran for shadow senator as the Libertarian Party candidate. Daniel was an entrepreneur. Daniel came in fourth place with 7,826 votes, four percent of the total vote.

Martin Moulton was the Libertarian Party candidate for shadow representative. Originally from the San Francisco Bay Area, and a graduate of Dartmouth College, Moulton is a resident of Shaw. Moulton worked in the health care technology sector. He is the board vice president of the Washington Area Bicyclist Association, vice chair of the Metropolitan Police Department's Third District Citizens Advisory Council and has served as the president of the Convention Center Community Association. He came in third place with 11,002 votes, or six percent of the total vote.

=== 2016 election cycle ===
The Libertarian Party ran several candidates in the District of Columbia.

Martin Moulton ran for Delegate to the U.S. House of Representatives. Moulton received 18,713 votes, six percent of the total vote.

Matthew Klokel ran for an at-large seat on the Council of the District of Columbia. Klokel received 14,178 votes, or two percent of the total vote.

Gary Johnson also appeared on the ballot for President of the United States. There were 4,906 District voters who voted for Johnson, two percent of the total vote.

Based on the number of votes received by Moulton, the Libertarian Party became a major party in the District of Columbia.

=== 2018 election cycle ===
The Libertarians ran four candidates in the 2018 elections:

Ethan Bishop-Henchman received 17,717 votes, or eight percent of the vote, as the only alternative candidate to the incumbent Council Chair, Phil Mendelson.

Joe Bishop-Henchman, Bishop-Henchman's husband, was the second-most successful Libertarian candidate, with 14,084 votes, seven percent of total votes, running against Attorney General Karl Racine.

Martin Moulton ran as a candidate in the District of Columbia mayoral election, offering Libertarian solutions for education, public safety and other issues. “Moulton says allowing free market forces to shape D.C.’s school system through school choice would help combat the District’s education problems by allowing parents to take control of their children’s education and hold bad schools and ineffective administrators accountable. ... Moulton says of the other problems that the District faces. ‘We think the solutions rely on trusting the public, trusting families, trusting parents, and trusting small businesses to do what’s in their best interests. Let’s take out the regulations that hamper them from doing that.’” He came last in a field of four candidates with 7,152 votes, but with the highest vote tally of any DC Libertarian mayoral candidate ever (As of Nov 4, 2020, Moulton holds the all time record as the top vote earner of any Libertarian in the Nation's Capital).

Bruce Majors ran as a candidate for Delegate to the U.S. House of Representatives, but came in fifth with 3,827 votes, two percent of the vote.

Denise Hicks filed to run as a candidate for at-large member of the Council, but did not appear on the ballot.

=== 2020 Libertarian National Convention ===
DC chair and convention delegate Joseph Bishop Henchman was elected as the 20th chair of the Libertarian National Committee (LNC).

=== 2020 election cycle ===
In 2020 the DC LP ran Partick Hynes for Delegate to Congress in a crowded field with several independent candidates. He earned over 9,000 votes, maintaining Libertarian ballot status.

=== 2022 Libertarian National Convention ===
DC elected three delegates to attend the national convention in Reno, NV May 26–29, Tom Fleming, Bruce Majors, and Pranav Badhwar. Majors and Badhwar were unable to attend the convention and the DC LP allowed them to be replaced with alternates who were not DC residents, Stephanie Berlin of Texas and Amy Lepore of Delaware. Tom Fleming was DC delegate chair.

=== 2022 election cycle ===
No Libertarians appeared in the 2022 primaries due to signature challenges. However, Libertarian voters were mailed Libertarian primary ballots with spaces for write in votes. The party conducted a mailing to registered Libertarian voters asking them to write in their votes in the primary during the early voting period. Bruce Majors declared his candidacy for both Delegate to Congress and for Chair of the D.C. Libertarian Party. Dennis Sobin declared his candidacy for Mayor. The party will hold a convention to be held June 26 at the Southeast Public Library.

As a result of the 2022 General Election, the Libertarian Party was no longer considered to be a major party in the District of Columbia and, therefore, is ineligible to hold primary elections via the D.C. Board of Elections.

== See also ==
- List of state Libertarian Parties in the United States
