= Mark Tuohey =

American attorney

Mark H. Tuohey III is an American attorney best known for representing corporations and white collar clients. In February 2015, he was appointed by Muriel Bowser as director of the Mayor of Washington D.C.'s Office of Legal Counsel In August 2018, he returned to private practice for law firm BakerHostetler.

== Education ==
Tuohey received a J.D. from Fordham University Law School in 1973 and B.A. from St. Bonaventure University in 1969. He has been called one of Washington's "go-to" white collar defense attorneys.

== Career ==
Tuohey has been labeled one of Washington's "go-to" white collar defense attorneys.

=== Whitewater Investigation ===
In 1994, Tuohey joined the legal team of Ken Starr in the investigation of the Whitewater controversy, leaving his position as a partner at the law firm Reed Smith. Tuohey served as Starr's deputy counsel.

=== Enron ===
In 2001, Tuohey sat on a special committee on Enron that Vinson & Elkins set up to oversee the company's defense in the Enron Scandal.

=== Bob Ney ===
In 2006, Touhey represented former Ohio Republican Congressman Bob Ney, who was convicted of conspiracy in charges related to the Jack Abramoff Indian lobbying scandal. In a Federal Election Commission filing showing expenses through the end of June 2006, Ney reported that he had not paid any legal fees since January 5 from campaign funds. Tuohey said Ney "needs money for his campaign and that's a priority right now. He intends to pay. He'll pay his fees, I have no doubt about that." Ney's withdrawal from his race meant that he could use his remaining campaign funds, almost half a million dollars, to pay for his legal defense.

=== Pershing Park Arrests ===
Tuohey represented Metropolitan Police Department chief Charles H. Ramsey after Ramsey was accused of a mass arrest of IMF protesters in Pershing Park in 2002. The case generated at least $1.53 million in fees for Vinson & Elkins. Tuohey assured the courts that Ramsey would comply with judges orders but was unable to produce key evidence. Local media expressed outrage over the cost of the lawyer fees.

In 2010, Tuohey left Vinson & Elkins after 16 years, citing the firm's mandatory retirement policy. He joined the law firm Brown Rudnick.

=== Jeanne Clarke Harris ===
In 2013, Tuohey represented Jeanne Clarke Harris, a public relations consultant who admitted in federal court to participating in the shadow campaign for Mayor Vincent Gray. Harris funneled financier Jeff Thompson's money through companies she owned.

=== Jack Evans ===
In 2019, Tuohey represented DC Councilmember Jack Evans, who was the subject of a federal probe in dealings with a sign company.

== Campaign for Attorney General ==
Tuohey announced his candidacy for the position of Attorney General of the District of Columbia in June 2014. Tuohey said that he was encouraged to run by individuals who want an Attorney General in the vein of incumbent Irvin B. Nathan, but withheld details, saying "I better not name names, but you'd know them all." In July, Tuohey dropped out of the race to endorse lawyer Karl Racine.
