= Venable LLP =

American law firm

- Headquarters: Washington, D.C.
- No. of offices: 13
- Offices: Annapolis, Baltimore, Chicago, Fort Lauderdale, Los Angeles, Miami, New York City, San Francisco, Tampa, Towson, Tysons, Washington, D.C., Wilmington
- No. of attorneys: 800+
- No. of employees: 1,300+
- Major practice areas: Corporate law, complex litigation, intellectual property, entertainment law, and government affairs
- Key people: Stuart Ingis, Chairman
- Revenue: $717,017,642 (2021)
- Profit per equity partner: $1,234,973 (2021)
- Date founded: 1900
- Founder: Richard Venable
- Company type: Limited liability partnership
- Website: www.venable.com

Venable LLP is an American law firm headquartered in Washington, D.C. Founded in 1900 by Richard Venable in Baltimore, Venable operates 13 offices across the United States and employs about 850 professionals specializing in regulatory, litigation, corporate, and investigations matters. It is the largest law firm in the state of Maryland.

In 2021, Venable was ranked as the 78th highest grossing law firm in the world. From 2020 to 2021, Venable's total revenue grew from US$681.8 million to $717 million. Revenue per lawyer saw a similar increase, with each lawyer generating a revenue of $965,031 and each equity partner generating $1.23 million on average.

== History ==
Venable was founded in 1900 by law professor Richard Venable in Baltimore, Maryland. In 1999, the firm merged with Washington-based Tucker Flyer. The firm expanded to Los Angeles in 2006.

In 2017, Venable headquarters moved its headquarters to 600 Massachusetts Avenue in Washington, D.C.

In 2018, Venable acquired the New York intellectual property firm Fitzpatrick Cella, which had 100 attorneys at the time.

Venable opened a construction law office in Chicago in January 2021, with firm chairman Stu Ingis stating that the decision to expand was founded on Venable's "history of measured, strategic growth through the addition of talented attorneys and practices in markets that support client needs".

In The American Lawyer AmLaw 100 ranking for 2021, Venable was rated 59th in revenue per lawyer, 71st in profits per lawyer, 76th in profits per equity partner, and 73rd in all-partner compensation, for an overall ranking of 65th.

Shortly after the 2022 Russian invasion of Ukraine, Venable terminated its lobbying deal with Sberbank, Russia's largest bank.

In November 2022, Venable announced a merger with Genovese Joblove & Battista, a multi-practice Florida-based law firm with offices in Miami, Tampa, and Fort Lauderdale. In January 2026, Venable relocated its Los Angeles office to an office space in Century City.

== Notable alumni and current attorneys ==
- Birch Bayh, former U.S. Senator from Indiana
- James H. Burnley IV, former U.S. Secretary of Transportation
- John Marshall Butler, former U.S. Senator from Maryland
- Benjamin Civiletti, former United States Attorney General
- Doug Emhoff, former Managing Director of Venable's West Coast Offices, Partner at DLA Piper, husband of Vice President of the United States Kamala Harris and Second Gentleman of the United States
- James W. Gerlach, former United States representative, Pennsylvania
- Asa Hutchinson, former governor of Arkansas, former Undersecretary of Homeland Security and former head of the Drug Enforcement Administration, former U.S. representative from Arkansas' 3rd congressional district
- Glenn F. Ivey, Congressman for Maryland’s fourth congressional district, United States' House of Representatives
- Amy Berman Jackson, District Judge on the United States District Court for the District of Columbia
- Benson E. Legg, former Chief Judge, United States District Court for the District of Maryland
- Daniel E. Lungren, former United States Representative, California and former Attorney General of California
- L. Paige Marvel, Article I federal judge for the United States Tax Court
- Powell Moore, former White House Legislative staff member and U.S. Department of State and Department of Defense official
- J. Frederick Motz, Senior Judge of the United States District Court for the District of Maryland
- Francis D. Murnaghan, Jr., former federal judge on the United States Court of Appeals for the Fourth Circuit
- Mark Pryor, former U.S. Senator from Arkansas
- William D. Quarles, Jr., former United States District Judge for the District of Maryland
- Karl Racine, the first elected Attorney General of the District of Columbia
- James E. Rogan, former U.S. Representative of California and current judge of the Superior Court of California
- John Sarbanes, U.S. Representative, Maryland's 3rd congressional district
- Paul Sarbanes, former U.S. Representative from Maryland and former U.S. Senator from Maryland
- Brian Schwalb, Attorney General for the District of Columbia
- Ari Schwartz, former member of the White House National Security Council where he served as Special Assistant to the President and Senior Director for Cybersecurity
- Bart Stupak, former U.S. Representative from Michigan's 1st congressional district
- Roger W. Titus, federal judge on the United States District Court for the District of Maryland
- Robert L. Wilkins, United States circuit judge of the United States Court of Appeals for the District of Columbia Circuit
