= Stuart G. Nash =

American lawyer

Stuart Nash

Judge of the District of Columbia Court of Appeals
- Incumbent
- Assumed office August 26, 2026
- Appointed by: Donald Trump
- Preceded by: Loren AliKhan

Judge of the District of Columbia Superior Court
- In office June 4, 2010 – June 30, 2016
- Appointed by: Barack Obama
- Preceded by: Rafael Diaz
- Succeeded by: Andrea L. Hertzfeld

Personal details
- Born: Stuart Gordon Nash; May 1965 (age 61) New York City, New York, U.S.
- Education: Duke University (BA); Harvard University (JD)

Stuart Gordon Nash (born May 1965) (known professionally as Stuart Nash) is an attorney in private practice and a former Judge of the Superior Court of the District of Columbia. On June 15, 2026, President Trump nominated Nash to a 15-year term as an associate judge on the District of Columbia Court of Appeals.

== Early life and education ==
Nash was born in May 1965, in New York City, New York. At a young age his family moved to Glen Rock, New Jersey, where he attended the public schools and graduated from Glen Rock High School. He received a Bachelor of Arts degree, magna cum laude, in 1987 from Duke University and a Juris Doctor, magna cum laude, in 1991 from Harvard Law School. He served as a law clerk for Chief Judge Samuel James Ervin III of the United States Court of Appeals for the Fourth Circuit and for Judge T. S. Ellis III of the United States District Court for the Eastern District of Virginia.

== Career ==
Nash was an attorney at the law firm of Williams & Connolly in Washington, D.C. for three and a half years, where he specialized in white collar criminal defense, commercial litigation, and antitrust for individual and corporate clients. From April 1997 until 2005, Nash was an Assistant United States Attorney in the District of Columbia. He served in the Appellate Division, representing the government in appeals at the District of Columbia Court of Appeals. He served in the Superior Court Division at various times in the misdemeanor section, felony section, grand jury section, violent crime section and community prosecution section, representing the government in prosecutions before the Superior Court of the District of Columbia. He also served in the Criminal Division in the transnational/major crimes section and gang section, where he represented the government in prosecutions at both the Superior Court of the District of Columbia and the United States District Court for the District of Columbia.

In 2001, Nash was detailed from the United States Attorney's Office to a position as Counsel to the Senate Judiciary Committee, advising the committee on criminal policy and assisting in the drafting of several significant pieces of criminal legislation, including the Patriot Act. He returned to the United States Attorney's Office in 2002.

In 2004, Nash was again detailed from the United States Attorney's Office, this time to serve as Counselor to the Attorney General. He advised the Attorney General on a range of criminal matters, including violent crime, gangs and financial crimes. While in that position, among other tasks, he chaired the Attorney General's Working Group on identity theft.

In 2005, Nash was appointed Director of the Organized Crime Drug Enforcement Task Force, a multi-agency task force combining the efforts of over 2000 federal law enforcement agents and over 600 federal prosecutors with the mission of investigating, prosecuting, and dismantling the world's largest drug-trafficking and money-laundering organizations. He served in this capacity until his appointment to the Superior Court.

Nash also served on the advisory board of the National Methamphetamine and Pharmaceutical Initiative, a nationwide organization devoted to elimination of methamphetamine and pharmaceutical crimes in the United States, until his appointment to the Superior Court.

=== Superior Court service ===
On June 8, 2009, President Barack Obama announced his intention to nominate Nash to the seat on the Superior Court of the District of Columbia vacated by Judge Rafael Diaz, whose term had expired. The Senate Governmental Affairs Committee held a hearing on his nomination on July 16, 2009. On July 29, 2009, the Senate Governmental Affairs Committee reported his nomination favorably to the floor of the United States Senate by a voice vote. His nomination was confirmed on April 20, 2010, by voice vote. On or subsequent to April 20, 2010, but by June 4, 2010, he received his commission. On June 4, 2010, he took the oath of office and assumed the duties of office. He resigned from the court in 2016.

=== Return to private practice ===
Since his departure from the Superior Court, Nash has served as a partner at the law firm of Holland & Knight. He is a litigation attorney and co-chair of the firm's national White Collar Defense and Investigations Team. He handles white collar criminal defense, governmental investigations, as well as employment discrimination claims, shareholder derivative suits, false advertising claims and general commercial litigation.

=== Nomination to Court of Appeals ===
On June 5, 2026, President Donald Trump announced his intention to nominate Nash to an undesignated seat on the District of Columbia Court of Appeals.

== Personal ==
Nash is married to Mary Ruppe Nash and has three children. They reside in Washington, D.C.

Legal offices
Preceded by Loren AliKhan	Judge of the District of Columbia Court of Appeals; 2026–present	Incumbent
