= Lorie Masters =

American lawyer

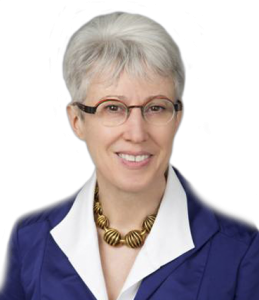
- Portrait of Masters, c. 2014
- Born: Lorelie Sue Masters; 1954 (age 71–72); Fremont, Michigan, U.S.
- Education: Georgetown University (BA); University of Notre Dame (JD)
- Occupations: Lawyer; politician
- Political party: Democratic
- Spouse: Jack Rose
- Children: 2
- Website: loriemasters.com

Lorelie Sue "Lorie" Masters (born 1954) is an American lawyer specializing in insurance litigation notable for her work supporting District of Columbia home rule and opposing human trafficking. She was a candidate for Attorney General of the District of Columbia in the 2014 election. She is currently special counsel at the law firm of Hunton Andrews Kurth in Washington.

== Activism ==
Masters supports budget autonomy and statehood for the District of Columbia. She served as a board member of D.C. Vote and at DC Appleseed, and advocated for voting rights for district residents. The National Law Journal described her as a "champion" for her pro bono work on voting rights, D.C. election law, diversity and inclusion issues. She assisted the Council of the District of Columbia in efforts to fight voting machine irregularities. Masters has worked for women's rights and on behalf of victims of human trafficking.

== Attorney General race ==
In 2014, Masters ran unsuccessfully in the District of Columbia's first-ever election for the position of Attorney General. Her campaign released mailing pieces which The Washington Post described as "text-heavy", a television advertisement that focused on her anti-corruption work, and a series of advertisements critical of opponents Karl Racine and Paul Zukerberg.

== Insurance litigation ==
Masters is a specialist in the area of insurance law. In 1997, she won a victory for plastics maker Hoechst Celanese in a landmark case. Her views on insurance law have been published in magazines and journals which cover insurance law including Benchmark Litigation, Super Lawyers, and Law 360 magazine.

== Publications ==
- Masters, Lorelie S.; Anderson, Eugene R.; Stanzler, Jordan S. (2000). Insurance coverage litigation (2nd ed.). Gaithersburg, Maryland: Aspen Law & Business. ISBN 9780735511736.
- Masters, Lorelie S.; Stanley, Paul; Jacobs, Richard (2011). Liability insurance in international arbitration: the Bermuda Form (2nd ed.). Oxford Portland, Oregon: Hart Publishing. ISBN 9781841138756.
