= Blake Morant =

American legal educator

Blake D. Morant is an American legal educator and professor of law at George Washington University Law School, where he was the Dean from 2014 to 2019.

== History ==
Morant received a bachelors (BA) degree in 1975 and juris doctor (JD) degree in 1978 from the University of Virginia. During his undergraduate years, Morant was inducted into Alpha Phi Alpha. Prior to his position as Wake Forest Dean, Morant taught law at several institutions across the United States and was most recently a Professor and Assistant Dean at Washington and Lee University School of Law, was a fellow of University College, Oxford, and worked in the private and public sectors. The Morants officially joined the Wake Forest University community in July 2007, and Morant began undertaking restructuring and fundraising plans that had been developed prior to his arrival. On February 4, 2019, Morant announced his intent to step down at the end of the academic year. He is the former Dean of Wake Forest University School of Law as of 2011.

== Personal life ==
Morant is married to fellow University of Virginia alumnus Paulette "P.J." Morant.
