= Linda Singer =

American attorney (born 1966)

Attorney General for the District of Columbia
- In office January 2, 2007 – January 5, 2008
- Mayor: Adrian Fenty
- Preceded by: Eugene Adams (acting)
- Succeeded by: Peter Nickles

Personal details
- Born: September 14, 1966 (age 59) Cleveland, Ohio, U.S.
- Education: Harvard University (BA, JD)

Linda Singer (born September 14, 1966) is an American attorney who served as attorney general of the District of Columbia from January 2, 2007 to January 5, 2008, and developed initiatives against gun violence.

== Early life and education ==
Singer was born in Cleveland, Ohio. She earned a Bachelor of Arts degree from Harvard College in 1988 and a Juris Doctor from Harvard Law School in 1991. As a law student, she was a leader of student protests against discrimination in law school faculty hiring.

== Career ==
She was a staff attorney at the Legal Aid Society of New York's Criminal Defense Division. She became the executive director of the Appleseed Foundation, and served in this post for 13 years.

She became a partner with Cohen Milstein in New York in 2009.

In 2017, Singer joined Motley Rice to grow the firm's public client practice.

== See also ==
- List of female state attorneys general in the United States

Legal offices
| Preceded by Eugene Adams; Acting | Attorney General for the District of Columbia; 2007–2008 | Succeeded by Peter Nickles |
