= Peter Nickles =

American lawyer

Attorney General of the District of Columbia
- In office January 6, 2008 – January 2011
- Mayor: Adrian Fenty
- Preceded by: Linda Singer
- Succeeded by: Irvin B. Nathan

Personal details
- Born: Peter John Nickles; September 26, 1938 (age 87) Middletown, New York, U.S.
- Party: Democratic
- Education: Princeton University (BA); Harvard University (LLB)

Peter John Nickles (born September 26, 1938) is an American attorney who served as Attorney General of the District of Columbia from 2008 to 2011. He was previously General Counsel to Mayor Adrian Fenty from the time he took office in January 2007 and a litigator at Covington & Burling from 1963 to 2006. He left office in 2011 to return to Covington.

Legal offices
Preceded by Linda Singer	Attorney General for the District of Columbia; 2008–2011	Succeeded by Irvin B. Nathan
