= Robert Spagnoletti =

American politician (born 1962)

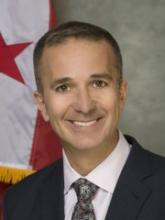

Attorney General for the District of Columbia
- In office 2003–2006
- Mayor: Anthony A. Williams
- Preceded by: Arabella Teal (acting)
- Succeeded by: Eugene Adams (acting)

Personal details
- Born: Robert James Spagnoletti; 1962 (age 63–64) New Jersey, U.S.
- Education: Lafayette College (BA); Georgetown University (JD)

Robert James Spagnoletti (born 1962) is the former Attorney General of the District of Columbia, United States, appointed 2003. He previously served as District of Columbia Corporation Counsel, and as an Assistant United States Attorney for the District of Columbia. He announced in late 2006 that he was leaving that office in 2006 to work at a private D.C. law firm, Schertler & Onorato LLP. He served a one-year term as President of the District of Columbia Bar beginning in June 2008 and became chief executive officer in May 2017.

== Education ==
- J.D., Georgetown University Law Center
- Bachelor's degree, Lafayette College

== Personal ==
Spagnoletti is openly gay and lives with his partner and their two sons.

Legal offices
| Preceded by Arabella Teal; Acting | Attorney General for the District of Columbia; 2003–2006 | Succeeded by Eugene Adams; Acting |
