= Appleseed Foundation =

American nonprofit organization

- Formation: 1993
- Type: Nonprofit
- Headquarters: Washington, D.C.
- Location: 1111 19th St NW Suite #200 Washington, D.C. 20036, United States
- Executive Director: Benet Magnuson
- Website: appleseednetwork.org

The Appleseed Foundation is a nonprofit organization that serves as the administrative hub for the Appleseed Network, a social justice network of centers in the United States and Mexico. Appleseed has received support from organizations including DLA Piper and the NFL.

== History ==
Appleseed was founded in 1993 by members of Harvard Law School's class of 1958 at their 35th reunion.

From the outset Appleseed was framed around what was then a singular approach to pro bono law. Its strategy was to address issues that lent themselves to system-wide reform rather than the traditional model of providing legal services to individuals with legal problems. While litigation is one tool used by some of the Appleseed Centers, the organization tends to focus on achieving structural changes through market-based reforms, policy analysis and research, legislation, and rule making.

== Structure ==
Appleseed's 20 Centers function as independent organizations linked to each other and with the national organization. Appleseed's network office is based in Washington, D.C. Appleseed helps promote Center work, serves as a clearinghouse of projects, and provides training and technical assistance, particularly in communications, development, project management and board development, as well as in the areas of education, immigration, financial access, health care and disaster recovery.

== Work ==
Appleseed has achieved enduring accomplishment in areas ranging from children's welfare, education reform, criminal justice reform, juvenile justice, electoral reform, judicial independence, access to health care, immigrant justice, housing development, government accountability, and the integration of environmentalism and community development. Appleseed currently has Centers in Alabama, Chicago Appleseed, Connecticut, the District of Columbia, Georgia, Hawai`i, Kansas, Louisiana, Massachusetts, Missouri, Nebraska, New Jersey, New Mexico, New York, South Carolina, Texas, and Mexico.

Some of Appleseed's work has included research on child protection at the Mexico-United States border, the HIV epidemic, youth homelessness in Texas, and broadband internet access in Kansas.

In 2017 and 2020, Appleseed published reports on discrimination against black students in New York and Massachusetts respectively. The research by Appleseed received congressional attention from Representatives Ayanna Pressley and Katherine Clark, who called on government agencies to rectify the situation. Appleseed did additional research on child protective services in 2021.
