= Brian Schwalb =

American lawyer (born 1967)

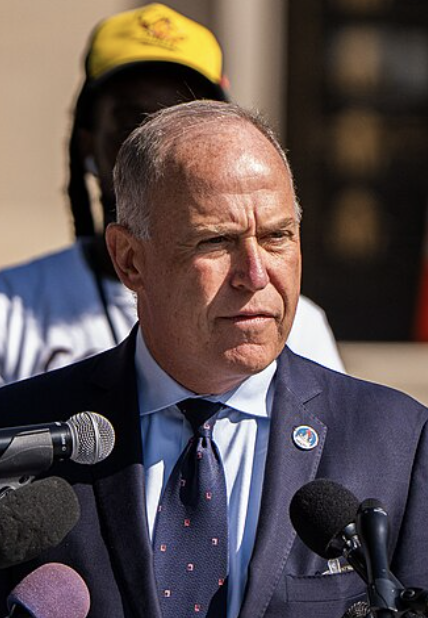

Attorney General for the District of Columbia
- Incumbent
- Assumed office January 2, 2023
- Mayor: Muriel Bowser
- Preceded by: Karl Racine

Personal details
- Born: Brian Lawrence Schwalb; September 1967 (age 59) Washington, D.C., U.S.
- Party: Democratic
- Spouse: Mickie
- Children: 3
- Education: Duke University (BA); Harvard University (JD)

Brian Lawrence Schwalb (born September 1967) is an American attorney and politician serving as the attorney general of the District of Columbia. Prior to becoming attorney general, Schwalb was the partner-in-charge of the D.C. office of the Venable law firm.

== Early life and education ==
Schwalb was born to a Jewish family at the Washington Hospital Center in Washington, D.C., in 1967. He graduated from Winston Churchill High School in Potomac, MD in 1985. He earned a bachelor's degree from Duke University and a juris doctor from Harvard Law School.

== Legal career ==
Schwalb served as a law clerk to U.S. District Judge John R. Hargrove in Baltimore. After completing service as a law clerk, Schwalb joined the Department of Justice Honor Program and became a trial attorney in the United States Department of Justice Tax Division.

After leaving the department of justice, Schwalb formed Schwalb, Donnenfeld & Schwalb, a boutique law firm. In 2005, he joined Venable, an international law firm where he served as vice chairman of the firm for four years and subsequently, was partner-in-charge of the home office in D.C.

== Attorney General of the District of Columbia ==
Schwalb ran in the 2022 District of Columbia Attorney General election to succeed incumbent Karl Racine. Schwalb was endorsed by the two previous District of Columbia attorneys general. In the primary election, Schwalb ran against Bruce Spiva and Ryan Jones and he won with 45% of the vote. He was unopposed in the general election.

In 2023, Schwalb began investigating the political funding networks of Leonard Leo and Arabella Advisors.

In March 2025, Schwalb dropped the lawsuit his predecessor, Karl Racine, had initiated against the Oath Keepers and Proud Boys for their participation in the events that unfolded at the capitol on January 6, 2021, explaining that the resources of the office of the attorney general would be more productive if applied to other issues.

On September 4, 2025, Schwalb filed their suit against military deployment to the district.

== Personal life ==
Schwalb lives in the Chevy Chase neighborhood of Washington, D.C. He and his wife, Mickie, have three daughters. Schwalb is a member and trustee of Adas Israel Congregation. He is a member of the Democratic Party.

== Electoral history ==
2022 District of Columbia attorney general election (Democratic primary) results
Party	Candidate	Votes	%
Democratic	Brian Schwalb	54,399	45.35
Democratic	Bruce V. Spiva	44,198	36.85
Democratic	Ryan L. Jones	20,518	17.11
Democratic	Write-in	827	0.69
Total votes		119,942	100
n/a	Overvotes	123	
n/a	Undervotes	8,266	

2022 District of Columbia attorney general election
Party	Candidate	Votes	%
Democratic	Brian Schwalb	177,126	97.51%
Independent	Write-in	4,516	2.49%
Total votes		181,642	100%
n/a	Overvotes	123	
n/a	Undervotes	23,647	

Legal offices
Preceded by Karl Racine	Attorney General for the District of Columbia; 2023–present	Incumbent
