= Irvin B. Nathan =

American lawyer

Irv Nathan
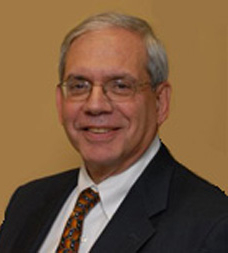

Attorney General of the District of Columbia
- In office January 2, 2011 – November 17, 2014
- Mayor: Vincent C. Gray
- Preceded by: Peter Nickles
- Succeeded by: Karl Racine

General Counsel of the United States House of Representatives
- In office 2007–2011
- Preceded by: Geraldine Gennet
- Succeeded by: Kerry Kircher

Personal details
- Born: Irvin Bertram Nathan; August 4, 1943 (age 83) Baltimore, Maryland, U.S.
- Died: September 5, 2026 Washington, DC
- Party: Democratic
- Spouse: Judith Walter
- Education: Johns Hopkins University (BA); Columbia University (LLB)

Irvin Bertram Nathan (August 4, 1943 - September 5, 2026) was an American lawyer who practiced in Washington, DC. He served as the attorney general of the District of Columbia from 2011 to 2015. He was appointed in 2011 by Mayor Vincent C. Gray. He previously served as the general counsel of the United States House of Representatives from 2007 to 2011. Nathan announced his resignation the day after the November 2014 election, in which voters chose Karl Racine as the first elected attorney general of D.C.

== Legal career ==
Nathan grew up in Baltimore, Maryland. His father was a procurement officer for the city, and his mother was a social worker for the state. Nathan attended nearby Johns Hopkins University for college, graduating in 1964. One of his classmates was future mayor of New York City Michael Bloomberg. He was initially interested in a career in journalism, serving as editor-in-chief of The Johns Hopkins News-Letter, as a sportscaster on the school radio station, and as a summer intern at The Baltimore Sun. However, he became somewhat disillusioned with the field during his summer internships and chose to pursue law instead.

Nathan moved to New York City to attend Columbia Law School, graduating in 1967. While there, he was a member of the Columbia Law Review and the winner of the Jerome Michael prize for the moot jury trial competition. After graduation, Nathan clerked for Simon Sobeloff on the United States Court of Appeals for the Fourth Circuit, whom he cites as one of his greatest mentors.

He spent most of his career (over 50 years) at Arnold & Porter, first as an associate and later as the senior litigating partner and head of its white collar criminal defense practice. On the side, he served as an adjunct professor at Georgetown University Law Center and the University of San Diego Law School.

From 1979 to 1981, Nathan served as a deputy assistant attorney general in the United States Department of Justice, where he was deeply involved in the Abscam operation. He returned in the early 1990s under the Clinton administration to serve as the principal deputy associate attorney general.

In 2007, Nathan became the general counsel of the United States House of Representatives, succeeding Geraldine R. Gennet. He served in that position for four years, providing legal advice to members, committees, and institutions within the House. One of his most notable actions during this time was to compel Bush administration official Harriet Miers and Joshua Bolten to comply with their subpoenas. He retired in 2011 following the Republican landslide in the 2010 midterm elections and was succeeded by Deputy General Counsel Kerry W. Kircher.

In 2011, he was appointed by Mayor Vincent C. Gray to be the attorney general of the District of Columbia. In this position, he managed an office of 700 employees, including 350 lawyers. One of his most notable acts as attorney general was to sue Harry Thomas Jr., a sitting member of the Council of the District of Columbia, for corruption securing a judgment and a settlement.

Nathan also recovered in litigation for the city over $70 million in unpaid taxes from online hotel companies; defeated in court a claim by the U.S. Department of Labor for $20 million in Davis Bacon payments in connection with the private construction of City Center in downtown D.C.; resolved several long-standing consent decrees against the city in the areas of mental health and education; and preserved the Corcoran Art School and Museum through arrangements with the George Washington University and the National Gallery of Art. He also inaugurated the Charles Ruff fellows program by which recent law school graduates from the local law schools in the District worked for one year at the Office of the Attorney General, lending their energy and talents to the office while securing excellent experience in a quest for fulltime employment either in public service or the private sector.

The D.C. attorney general position become an elected office in 2014, and Nathan declined to run announcing his resignation, effective November 17, 2014.

In December, 2014, Nathan re-joined the Law Firm of Arnold & Porter LLP as senior counsel.

In 2016, Nathan was the subject of an oral history of his career by the Historical Society of the U.S. Circuit Court of Appeals for the D.C. Circuit.

== Transition of Attorney General position from appointed to elected ==
In July 2012, the DC council voted to postpone the election of attorney general to 2018. Council Chairman Phil Mendelson called the vote "an embarrassment." In September 2013, Paul Zukerberg filed suit against the DC Council and the city elections claiming any delay would violate the District charter — which was amended through the 2010 ballot question to provide for the election of the city's top lawyer. Nathan represented the city and initially argued that Zukerberg was not suffering any "meaningful hardship" from pushing back the election. In a 265-page opposition to Zukerberg's preliminary injunction, Nathan claimed that "the intent of the voters…is simply not relevant, for a variety of obvious reasons." In November 2013, Zukerberg announced his candidacy for Attorney General.

On August 28, 2014 Washingtonian magazine reported that three anonymous staff members at the Office of the Attorney General had filed complaints with the D.C. Board of Elections alleging Nathan and Office of the Attorney General employee Timothy Thomas had violated the Hatch Act of 1939 by promoting the campaign of attorney general candidate Karl Racine at work. Thomas allegedly circulated petition signature sheets to employees at the Office, while according to one employee Nathan "praised and recommended Karl Racine, and he asked us to support him" during two July 9 meetings to discuss the implications of the election for the Office. Nathan was completely exonerated of all of these charges by the D.C. Board of Ethics and Government Accountability.

Legal offices
Preceded by Peter Nickles	Attorney General of the District of Columbia; 2011–2014	Succeeded by Karl Racine
