= Karl Racine =

Haitian-American lawyer and politician (born 1962)

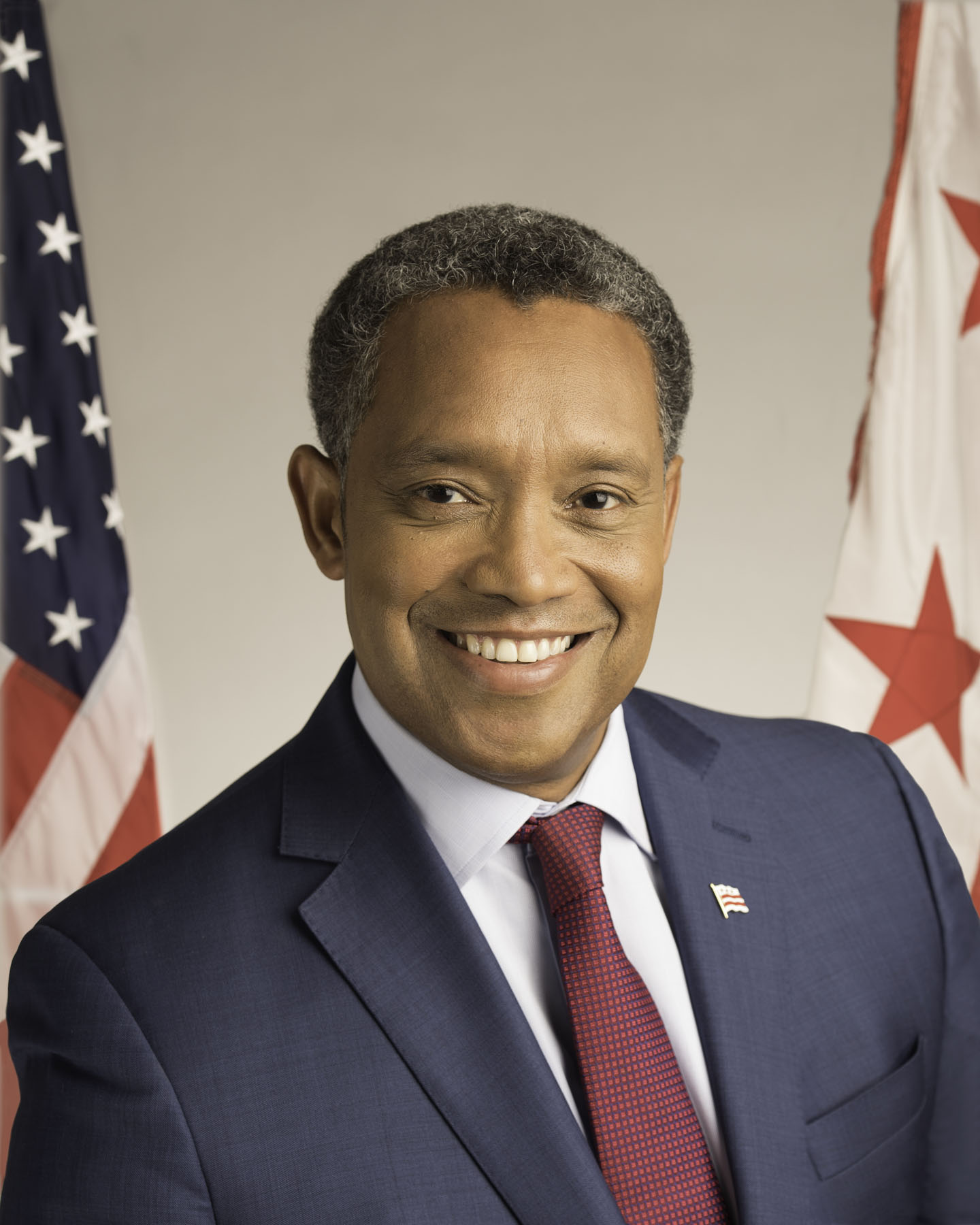

Attorney General for the District of Columbia
- In office January 2, 2015 – January 2, 2023
- Mayor: Muriel Bowser
- Preceded by: Irvin B. Nathan
- Succeeded by: Brian Schwalb

Personal details
- Born: Karl Anthony Racine; December 14, 1962 (age 63) Port-au-Prince, Haiti
- Party: Democratic
- Education: University of Pennsylvania (BA); University of Virginia (JD)

Karl Anthony Racine (born December 14, 1962) is a Haitian-American lawyer and politician. He was the first independently elected attorney general for the District of Columbia, a position he held from 2015 to 2023. Before that, he was the managing partner of Venable LLP. As Attorney General, Racine received national attention for his work on antitrust matters.

== Early life and education ==
Born in Port-au-Prince, Haiti, Racine and his family fled the François Duvalier regime and emigrated to Washington, D.C., when he was three years old. He attended public schools until eighth grade and graduated from St. John's College High School, and was a star high school basketball player.

Racine attended the University of Pennsylvania and became the team captain of the basketball team. He led the team to two Ivy League championships and made the second team all-Ivy League two times.

Racine then went to the University of Virginia School of Law, where he worked at a pro bono clinic representing migrant farm workers. He said he was drawn to the law because of the role lawyers played in advancing civil rights. While in law school, he and his mother produced the first Haitian Creole/English legal dictionary, intended to aid Haitian immigrants in the United States.

== Legal career ==
After graduating from law school in 1989, Racine joined Venable LLP but left in 1992 to become a staff attorney at the Public Defender Service for the District of Columbia. He then returned to private practice at Cacheris & Treanor, where he handled large white-collar and civil cases, and later served as associate White House counsel in the Clinton administration. In addition, he served as a member of the D.C. Judicial Nomination Commission, a selection panel for judges. Racine returned to Venable in 2000 and was elected managing partner in 2006, becoming the first black managing partner of a top-100 law firm.

He led the team representing food services corporation Sodexo in a class action racial discrimination suit brought by over 2,500 African American employees, one of the largest such suits brought after the 1991 amendments to Title VII of the Civil Rights Act of 1964.

From 2011 to 2012, Racine represented D.C. Councilmember Harry Thomas Jr., who pleaded guilty after a protracted investigation to diverting $300,000 in grants earmarked for charity and youth baseball groups to pay for personal luxury items. During sentencing, Racine successfully argued that Thomas deserved a lighter sentence because his guilty plea was an example of his commitment to teaching the District's youth how to "take responsibility when you have done wrong." Racine later said Thomas "needed counsel to represent him zealously" and told possible critics, "I would represent them if, God forbid, they made significant mistakes, errors and violated the law."

In July 2014, Racine led an inquest into state-issued credit card spending by members of the Board of Education in Montgomery County, Maryland, finding no evidence of intentional wrongdoing but recommending that access to the cards be revoked.

Following his tenure as D.C. Attorney General, he joined law firm Hogan Lovells as a litigation partner.

== D.C. Attorney General ==
=== Elections ===
In July 2014, Racine announced his candidacy for D.C. Attorney General, prompting friend and fellow prominent white-collar attorney Mark Tuohey to drop out of the race and endorse him, saying he "has all the qualifications."

On November 4, 2014, Racine became the first elected Attorney General for the District of Columbia, beating out four other challengers with 37% of the vote.

In September 2017, Racine announced he would run for reelection. Racine won reelection in the May 15 general election with 93% of the vote against Libertarian candidate Joe Henchman. Racine was mentioned as a possible candidate for mayor in 2022, to challenge incumbent Mayor Muriel Bowser, but decided not to run.

Racine did not seek reelection as the city's Attorney General in 2022.

=== Tenure ===
As Attorney General, Racine has established four priorities for the DC Office of the Attorney General: data-driven juvenile justice reform, protecting consumers from abusive tactics by unscrupulous businesses, preserving affordable housing and protecting tenants in communities across the District, and advancing democracy and safeguarding public integrity. Following the 2021 storming of the United States Capitol, Racine urged Vice President Mike Pence to invoke the Twenty-fifth Amendment to the United States Constitution in order to remove President Donald Trump from office, declaring him "disinterested [sic] in upholding the duties of his office".

In line with these priorities, Attorney General Racine helped end mandatory shackling of juveniles appearing before D.C. Superior Court and expanded options for rehabilitating low-risk juvenile offenders. A diversion program that helps these young people get and stay on the right track has achieved a success rate of nearly 80 percent. Under Attorney General Racine, OAG has increased participation in the program five-fold, positively impacting young lives and increasing public safety.

In 2015, Attorney General Racine established a standalone Office of Consumer Protection within OAG focused on outreach, education and legal actions to protect consumers. He has brought tens of millions of dollars to the District through settlements and judgments in cases against corporate wrongdoers. In 2017, Racine established the Public Advocacy Division to bring affirmative litigation to preserve affordable housing, protect residents against wage theft, safeguard the environment and ensure public integrity.

in 2019, Racine's office sued DoorDash for not paying customers' tips to delivery drivers. DoorDash used the tips to offset the "guaranteed amount" it paid drivers for each delivery, despite wording on its mobile app and website that said tips would be added to drivers' earnings, which Racine called "deceptive" and a violation of the District's Consumer Protection Procedures Act. DoorDash's settlement with the Attorney General's office required DoorDash to maintain a policy that tips would go to drivers without offsetting their guarantee amount. The settlement also required DoorDash to pay $1.5 million to drivers who had made deliveries in the District while the tipping policy had been in place and to give $250,000 to local charities.

In 2021, Racine filed a lawsuit involving the National Rifle Association, focusing on financial oversight and governance practices related to gun‑violence prevention. In 2021, Racine launched an antitrust lawsuit against Amazon, which was subsequently dismissed in court in March 2022. Known for his work on antitrust matters, in 2021 he was considered for a position on the Federal Trade Commission (FTC) by President Joe Biden.

== Personal life ==
Racine served as a board member of the Legal Aid Society of the District of Columbia, as a member of the steering committee of the Whitman-Walker Clinic's Legal Services Program, and as a board member of the local literacy organization Everybody Wins.

He has also been active in aiding his native Haiti, raising $125,000 from Venable's lawyers, staff, and foundation to support relief efforts after the 2010 Haiti earthquake, and raising money for the Haitian Education and Leadership Program (HELP). In 2022, Racine was named by Carnegie Corporation of New York as an honoree of the Great Immigrants Award.

Racine lives in the Palisades. He is dating attorney Kimberly Stietz of law firm Covington & Burling. They have sons Karim (2020) and Kayleb (2021) together. Racine is Catholic.

Legal offices
Preceded by Irvin B. Nathan	Attorney General for the District of Columbia; 2015–2023	Succeeded by Brian Schwalb
