= Attorney General for the District of Columbia =

Chief legal officer of Washington, D.C.

Attorney General of the District of Columbia
- Seal of the Office of the Attorney General

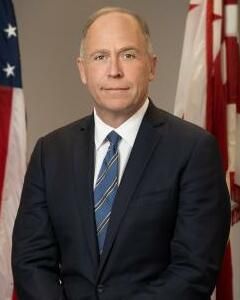
- Incumbent; Brian Schwalb since January 2, 2023
- Term length: Four years, renewable
- Inaugural holder: Richard Wallach (predecessor role, appointed); Karl Racine (elected)
- Formation: 1973
- Website: Office of the Attorney General

The Attorney General for the District of Columbia is the chief legal officer of the District of Columbia. The position has been elected by popular vote of D.C. residents since 2015. The current attorney general is Brian Schwalb, who has served since January 2, 2023.

Due to D.C.'s unique status as a federal enclave and not part of a state, the attorney general's position is unique, and shares some similarities with other states' attorneys general, some with local prosecutors and some with municipal legal departments.

The attorney general enforces many of the district's laws, provides advice and counsel the local government and departments, and assists consumers and others in the district. He is responsible for prosecuting juvenile criminal law and some misdemeanor crimes for adults, but adult felonies and other prosecutions are handled by the U.S. attorney for the District of Columbia, a federal Department of Justice official who is appointed by and reports to the president.

== History ==
From Congress's creation of Washington, D.C.'s municipal government in 1802 until 1824, it did not have a city attorney position. Various local attorneys were retained for particular matters, including Francis Scott Key, best known as the author of the text of "The Star-Spangled Banner", who was paid $60 in 1820 for legal services.

In 1824, the elected city council created the early precursor to the attorney general, then called the City Attorney, for Washington, which was at the time a separate city from Georgetown and the rest of the district. Richard Wallach was the first city attorney, serving from July 1, 1824, to June 30, 1830, and paid $100 per year. The position was appointed by the mayor, who was at the time appointed by the president of the United States. When the city's charter was reorganized by Congress into a unified District in 1871, the position was renamed to Attorney for the District of Columbia and appointed by the governor and later the Board of Commissioners. It was briefly renamed City Solicitor in 1901, but became Corporation Counsel the next year.

The District of Columbia Home Rule Act of 1973 by Congress brought the district a democratically elected mayor. The chief legal officer was still the corporation counsel, but the mayor was given the power to appoint them.

On May 26, 2004, Mayor Anthony A. Williams signed an executive order that changed the name of the office to Attorney General without making any substantive changes to its responsibilities or functions.

=== Elected position ===
In the November 2, 2010, general election, voters approved Charter Amendment IV that made the office of Attorney General an elected position.

Charter Amendment IV
Choice	Votes	%
For	90,316	75.78
Against	28,868	24.22
Total	119,184	100.00
Registered voters/turnout	453,014	26.30

=== Election delays ===
In July 2012, the District of Columbia council voted to postpone the election of attorney general to 2018, citing a dispute over how much power the elected attorney general would have. Council Chairman Phil Mendelson called the vote "an embarrassment."

In September 2013, Paul Zukerberg filed suit against the District of Columbia Council and the city elections claiming any delay would violate the District charter — which was amended through the 2010 ballot question to provide for the election of the city’s top lawyer. Attorney General Irv Nathan initially argued that Zukerberg was not suffering any “meaningful hardship” from pushing back the election.

On February 7, 2014, a District of Columbia Superior Court judge ruled that ballots for the April 1 primary could be printed without the Attorney General race. Zukerberg appealed the ruling, declaring himself a candidate and arguing that he would suffer "irreparable harm" if the election were postponed.

On June 4, 2014, the District of Columbia Court of Appeals overturned the lower court's decision. The Court held "that the Superior Court's interpretation was incorrect as a matter of law" and reversed. The Court ruled that the original language in the Elected Attorney General Act is ambiguous in stating the election "shall be after January 1, 2014," and that the attorney general referendum ratified by a majority of District of Columbia voters in 2010 made it seem as though the election would take place in 2014. On June 13, Zukerberg collected nominating petitions.

=== 2014 election ===
Joining Zukerberg as candidates for the position were insurance litigator and activist Lorie Masters, federal lawyer Edward "Smitty" Smith, white-collar attorney Karl Racine, and legislative policy analyst Lateefah Williams. Racine secured a plurality victory, winning 36% of the votes cast, and was sworn in as the first elected Attorney General in January 2015.

=== Later history ===
In 2025, following the deployment of federal forces in D.C. by President Donald Trump, Republicans in Congress advanced legislation that would remove the elected attorney general and replace the position with one appointed by the president.

== List of officeholders ==
In 1824, the position of City Attorney was established by resolution of the City Council. When the District of Columbia took on the territorial form of government on July 1, 1871, the position of Attorney for the District of Columbia was established by the First Legislative Assembly. In 1901, the position title was changed to City Solicitor, and in 1902, the title was changed to Corporation Counsel, which it remained until 2004. In 2004, the office's name was changed to Attorney General by Mayor's Order 2004-92, May 26.

=== City attorneys (1824-1871) ===
Name	Took office	Left office
Richard Wallach Sr.	July 1, 1824	June 30, 1830
Richard S. Cox	July 1, 1830	June 30, 1834
Joseph H. Bradley	July 1, 1834	June 30, 1850
James M. Carlyle	July 1, 1850	June 30, 1854
James H. Bradley	July 1, 1854	June 30, 1856
James M. Carlyle	July 1, 1856	June 30, 1862
Joseph H. Bradley	July 1, 1862	June 30, 1867
Joseph H. Bradley Jr.	July 1, 1867	June 30, 1868
William A. Cook	July 1, 1868	June 30, 1870
Enoch Totten	July 1, 1870	May 31, 1871

=== Appointed before Home Rule ===
Image	Name	Took office	Left office	President(s) of the Board
	William A. Cook	July 2, 1871	July 2, 1874	William Dennison Jr. (de facto)
	Edwin L. Stanton	July 3, 1874	October 31, 1876	William Dennison Jr. (de facto)
	William Birney	November 1, 1876	October 31, 1877	William Dennison Jr. (de facto)
	Alfred G. Riddle	November 1, 1877	November 30, 1889	William Dennison Jr. (de facto); Seth Ledyard Phelps; Josiah Dent; J. R. West; James Barker Edmonds; William Benning Webb; John Watkinson Douglass
	George C. Hazelton	1889	1893	John Watkinson Douglass
	Sidney J. Thomas	1893	1899	John Wesley Ross; John Brewer Wright
	Andrew B. Duvall	1899	September 12, 1905	John Brewer Wright; Henry Brown Floyd MacFarland
	Edward H. Thomas	1905	1913	Henry Brown Floyd MacFarland; Cuno Hugo Rudolph
	Conrad H. Syme	1913	1920	Oliver Peck Newman; Louis Brownlow
	Francis H. Stephens	1920	1927	
	William W. Bride	1927	1934	Proctor L. Dougherty; Luther Halsey Reichelderfer; Melvin Colvin Hazen
	E. Barrett Prettyman	1934	1936	Melvin Colvin Hazen
	Elwood H. Seal	1936	1940	
	Richmond B. Keech	1940	1945	
	Vernon West	1945		
	Chester H. Gray	1956	1965	Robert E. McLaughlin; Walter Nathan Tobriner
	Charles T. Duncan	1966	1970	Walter Nathan Tobriner
	C. Francis Murphy	1970	1976	Walter Washington

=== Appointed after Home Rule ===
No.	Image	Name	Took office	Left office	Mayor(s)
1		C. Francis Murphy	1970	1976	Walter Washington
2		John R. Risher	1976	June 1978	Walter Washington
Acting		Louis P. Robbins	June 1978	April 12, 1979	Walter Washington; Marion Barry
3		Judith W. Rogers	April 12, 1979	September 15, 1983	Marion Barry
4		Inez Smith Reid	September 15, 1983	July 8, 1986	Marion Barry
Acting		John H. Suda	July 8, 1986	1986	Marion Barry
Acting		James R. Murphy	1986	1987	Marion Barry
5		Frederick D. Cooke Jr.	1987	1990	Marion Barry
Acting		Herbert O. Reid Sr.	1990	1991	Marion Barry
Acting		Beverly J. Burke	1991	1991	Marion Barry; Sharon Pratt Kelly
6		John Payton	1991	1994	Sharon Pratt Kelly
7		Vanessa Ruiz	1994	October 7, 1994	Sharon Pratt Kelly
Acting		Erias Hyman	October 7, 1994	1995	Sharon Pratt Kelly
Interim		Garland Pinkston	1995	August 1995	Marion Barry
8		Charles Ruff	August 1995	February 1997	Marion Barry
Interim		Jo Anne Robinson	February 1997	September 24, 1997	Marion Barry
9		John M. Ferren	September 24, 1997	April 19, 1999	Marion Barry; Anthony A. Williams
Interim		Jo Anne Robinson	April 19, 1999	1999	Anthony A. Williams
10		Robert Rigsby	1999	2002	Anthony A. Williams
Interim		Arabella W. Teal	2002	2003	Anthony A. Williams
11		Robert Spagnoletti	2003	2006	Anthony A. Williams
Interim		Eugene Adams	2006	December 31, 2006	Anthony A. Williams
12		Linda Singer	January 2, 2007	January 5, 2008	Adrian Fenty
13		Peter Nickles	January 6, 2008	January 2011	Adrian Fenty
14		Irvin B. Nathan	January 2011	November 17, 2014	Vincent C. Gray

=== Elected ===
No.	Image	Name	Took office	Left office	Mayor(s)
15		Karl Racine	January 2, 2015	January 2, 2023	Muriel Bowser
16		Brian Schwalb	January 2, 2023	present	Muriel Bowser

== See also ==
- Solicitor General of the District of Columbia
