= 2026 Washington, D.C., mayoral election =

- November 3, 2026
- Votes counted: 90% as of 14 November 2026, 6:26PM EST

Nominee	Janeese Lewis George	Rhonda Hamilton
Party	Democratic	Independent
Popular vote	176,297	21,009
Percentage	84.3%	10.0%
- George: 70–80% 80–90%
Mayor before election
Muriel Bowser
Democratic
Elected Mayor
Janeese Lewis George
Democratic

The 2026 Washington, D.C., mayoral election was held on November 3, 2026, to elect the mayor of Washington, D.C.. Democratic D.C. councilmember Janeese Lewis George won the election by a wide margin, after having received the party's nomination in the June 16 primaries with 54.1% of the vote. Incumbent mayor Muriel Bowser chose not to seek a fourth term.

The election is the first D.C. mayoral election to use ranked-choice voting, following the approval of Initiative 83 in 2024.

== Democratic primary ==
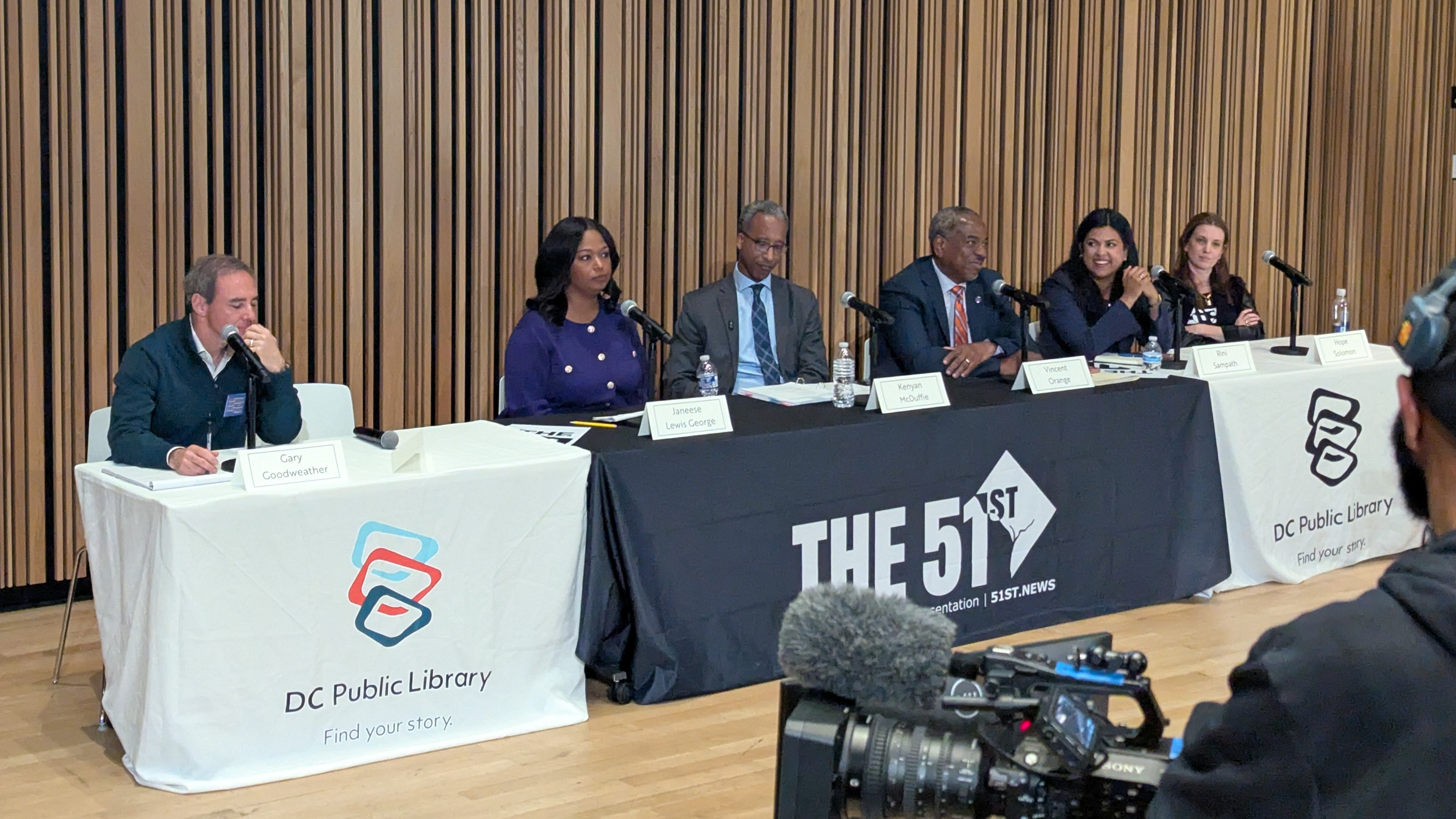
Mayoral candidates at a debate hosted by The 51st, April 20, 2026.

=== Candidates ===
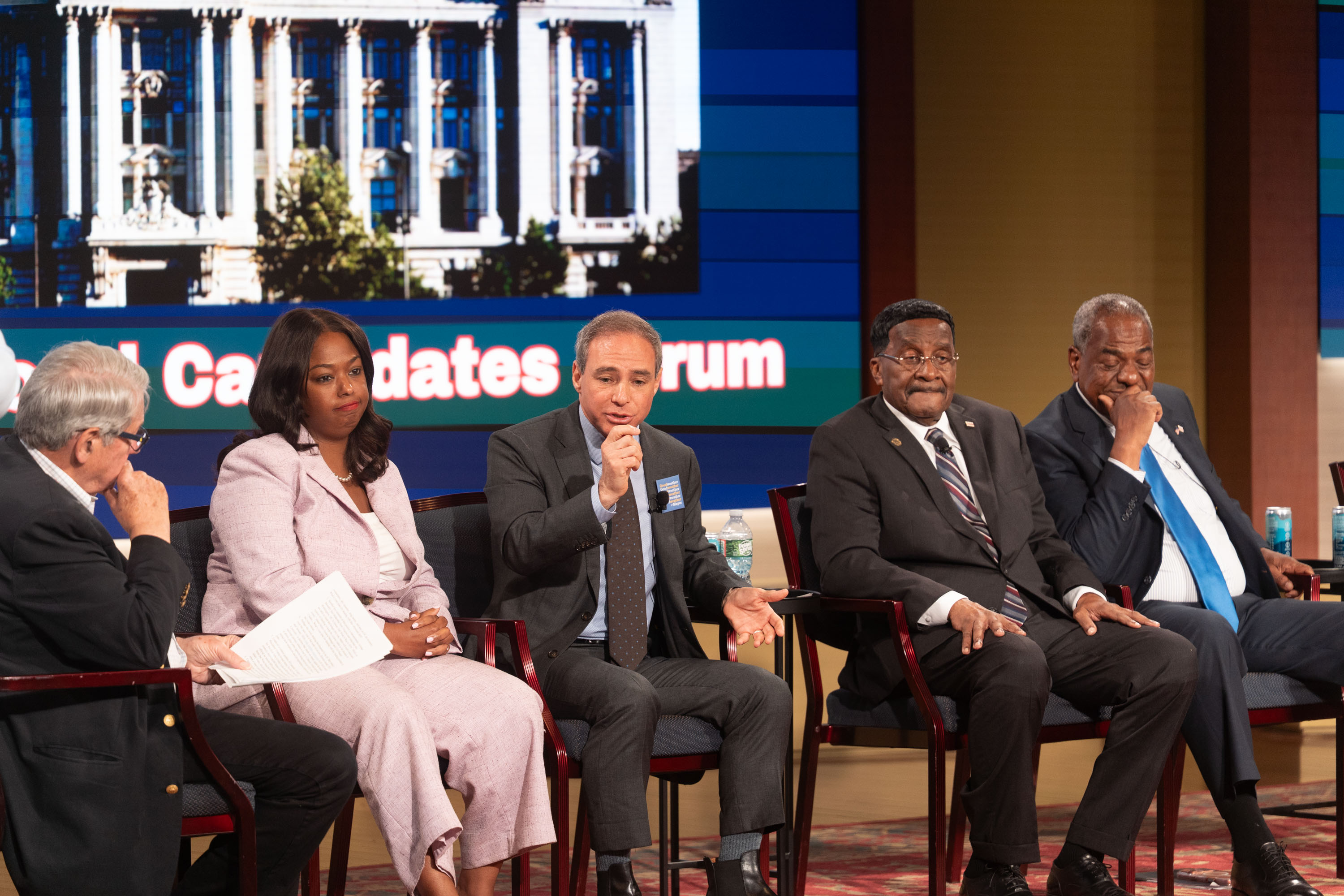
Democratic candidates Janeese Lewis George, Gary Goodweather, Ernest Johnson, Vincent Orange and Rini Sampath attend a panel at George Washington University

==== Nominee ====
- Janeese Lewis George, councilmember from Ward 4 (2021–present)

==== Eliminated in primary ====
- Yaida Ford, civil rights attorney (write-in)
- Gary Goodweather, real estate developer
- Ernest Johnson, chairman and CEO of Friends of Frank Reeves Center and candidate for mayor in 2010 and 2018
- Kenyan McDuffie, former councilmember from Ward 5 (2012–2023) and at-large councilmember (2023–2026)
- Vincent Orange, former at-large councilmember (2011–2016) and councilmember from Ward 5 (1999–2007)
- Rini Sampath, cybersecurity consultant
- Melodie Shuler, attorney (write-in)
- Hope Solomon, former federal government contractor

==== Declined ====
- Muriel Bowser, incumbent mayor (2015–present)
- Randy Clarke, general manager and CEO of the Washington Metropolitan Area Transit Authority
- Karl Racine, former attorney general of the District of Columbia (2015–2023) (endorsed Lewis George)
- Robert White, at-large councilmember (2016–present) and candidate for mayor in 2022 (running for U.S. House, endorsed Lewis George)

=== Endorsements ===
Gary Goodweather

Organizations

- DMV New Liberals (second choice)
Janeese Lewis George

U.S. representatives

- Ilhan Omar, MN-05 (2019–present)

Local officials

- Yvette Alexander, former councilmember from the 7th ward (2007–2017)
- Charles Allen, councilmember from the 6th ward (2015–present)
- Brianne Nadeau, councilmember from the 1st ward (2015–present)
- Karl Racine, former attorney general of the District of Columbia (2015–2023)
- Tommy Wells, former councilmember from the 6th ward (2007–2015) (candidate's campaign chair)
- Robert White, councilmember from the at-large ward (2016–present)
- Zachary Parker, councilmember from the 5th ward (2023–present)

Labor unions

- 1199SEIU United Healthcare Workers East
- AFL-CIO Metropolitan Washington Council
- Amalgamated Transit Union Local 689
- American Federation of Government Employees
- AFGE Local 2978
- American Federation of Teachers Local 6
- Committee of Interns and Residents
- Eastern Atlantic States Regional Council of Carpenters
- IAFF Local 36
- IBEW Local 26
- IUPAT District Council 51
- LIUNA Philadelphia/Baltimore/Washington Laborers' District Council
- SEIU 32BJ
- SEIU Local 500
- United Food and Commercial Workers Local 400
- UNITE HERE Locals 23 and 25
- UFCW Local 400
- Washington Teachers Union

Organizations

- Advocates for Trans Equality
- Capital Stonewall Democrats
- CASA in Action
- Free DC
- Greater Greater Washington
- Jews United for Justice
- Metro DC Democratic Socialists of America
- Our Revolution D.C.
- People for the American Way
- Sierra Club

Political parties

- Working Families Party

Newspapers

- Baltimore Afro-American
Kenyan McDuffie

Executive branch officials

- Eric Holder, former U.S. attorney general (2009–2015)
- Tom Perez, former U.S. secretary of labor (2013–2017) and chair of the Democratic National Committee (2017–2021)
- Neera Tanden, former senior advisor to the president (2021–2025), director of the Domestic Policy Council (2023–2025), and White House staff secretary (2021–2023)

U.S. senators

- Angela Alsobrooks, U.S. senator from Maryland (2025–present)

Local officials

- Anita Bonds, council chair pro tempore (2026–present) from the at-large ward (2012–present)
- Aisha Braveboy, county executive of Prince George's County, Maryland (2025–present)
- Mary Cheh, former councilmember from the 3rd ward (2007–2023)
- Linda Cropp, former council chair (1997–2007) from the at-large ward (1991–1997)
- Charlene Drew Jarvis, former councilmember from the 4th ward (1979–2001)
- Wendell Felder, councilmember from the 7th ward (2025–present)
- Sharon Pratt, former mayor of Washington, D.C. (1991–1995)
- Anthony Williams, former mayor of Washington, D.C. (1999–2007)

Party officials

- Jaime Harrison, former chair of the Democratic National Committee (2021–2025)

Organizations

- District of Columbia Association of Realtors
- DMV New Liberals (first choice)
- Greater Capital Area Association of Realtors
- Metro D.C. Associated Builders and Contractors
- Restaurant Association of Greater Washington

Newspapers

- Washington Jewish Week
Rini Sampath

Organizations

- DMV New Liberals (third choice)
Declined to endorse

U.S. senators

- Chris Van Hollen, Maryland (2017–present)

Local officials

- Muriel Bowser, incumbent mayor (2015–present) (Note: Bowser stated that she supports Kenyan Duffie, but is "not endorsing ... for mayor, because I'm stepping off the political stage.")

Organizations

- Congressional Progressive Caucus

=== Fundraising ===
Campaign finance reports as of January 31, 2026
Candidate	Raised	Spent	Cash on hand
Janeese Lewis George (D)	$70,017	$171,537	$117,944
Gary Goodweather (D)	$302,091	$82,368	$225,609
Kenyan McDuffie (D)	$288,750	$13,820	$274,930
Source: District of Columbia Office of Campaign Finance

=== Polling ===
Poll source	Date(s) administered	Sample size (Note: Key: A – all adults RV – registered voters LV – likely voters V – unclear)	Margin of error	Gary Goodweather	Ernest Johnson	Janeese Lewis George	Kenyan McDuffie	Vincent Orange	Rini Sampath	Hope Solomon	Other	Undecided
The Washington Post/George Mason University/Braun Research	May 27 – June 1, 2026	836 (LV)	± 3.7%	3%	1%	36%	25%	4%	3%	1%	2% (Note: "Someone else" & "None" with 1%)	25%
City Cast DC/True Dot	May 12–17, 2026	487 (RV)	± 4.4%	7%	3%	39% (Note: Including voters who lean towards a given candidate)	34%	5%	4%	2%	6% (Note: "Other" & "Would not vote" with 3%)	–

=== Results ===
Results by ward Lewis George: 40–50%; 50–60%; 60–70%; McDuffie: 40–50%

Results by precinct Lewis George: 40–50%; 50–60%; 60–70%; 70–80%; McDuffie: 40–50%; 50–60%; 60–70%; 70–80%

Democratic primary results
Party	Candidate	Votes	%
Democratic	Janeese Lewis George	76,276	54.13
Democratic	Kenyan McDuffie	49,414	35.07
Democratic	Rini Sampath	4,544	3.22
Democratic	Gary Goodweather	4,403	3.12
Democratic	Vincent Orange	3,582	2.54
Democratic	Hope Solomon	1,501	1.07
Democratic	Ernest Johnson	717	0.51
Write-in		463	0.33
Total votes		140,900	100.00
n/a	Overvotes	581	
n/a	Undervotes	927	

== Statehood Green primary ==
=== Candidates ===
==== Nominee ====
- Robert L. Gross, information technology specialist

==== Did not qualify ====
- Muhsin Umar

=== Results ===
Statehood Green primary
Party	Candidate	Votes	%
DC Statehood Green	Robert L. Gross	420	53.92
Write-in		359	46.08
Total votes		779	100.00
n/a	Overvotes	5	
n/a	Undervotes	102	

== Independent and third-party candidates ==
=== Candidates ===
==== Declared ====
- Rhonda Hamilton, business owner
- Talib Karim Muhammad, attorney and engineer (independent write-in candidate)
- Nadeem Adam Khan, engineer (write-in)

==== Withdrawn ====
- Myrtle Alexander, businesswoman

==== Declined ====
- Elissa Silverman, former at-large councilmember (2015–2023) (ran for at-large special election)

== General election ==
=== Results ===
2026 Washington, D.C., mayoral election
Party	Candidate	Votes	%
Democratic	Janeese Lewis George	186,431	84.36
Independent	Rhonda Hamilton	22,160	10.03
DC Statehood Green	Robert L. Gross	7,738	3.50
Write-in		4,654	2.11
Total votes		220,983	100.00
