= 2026 United States House of Representatives election in the District of Columbia =

- November 3, 2026
- Reporting: 90% as of November 10, 6:30 AM ET
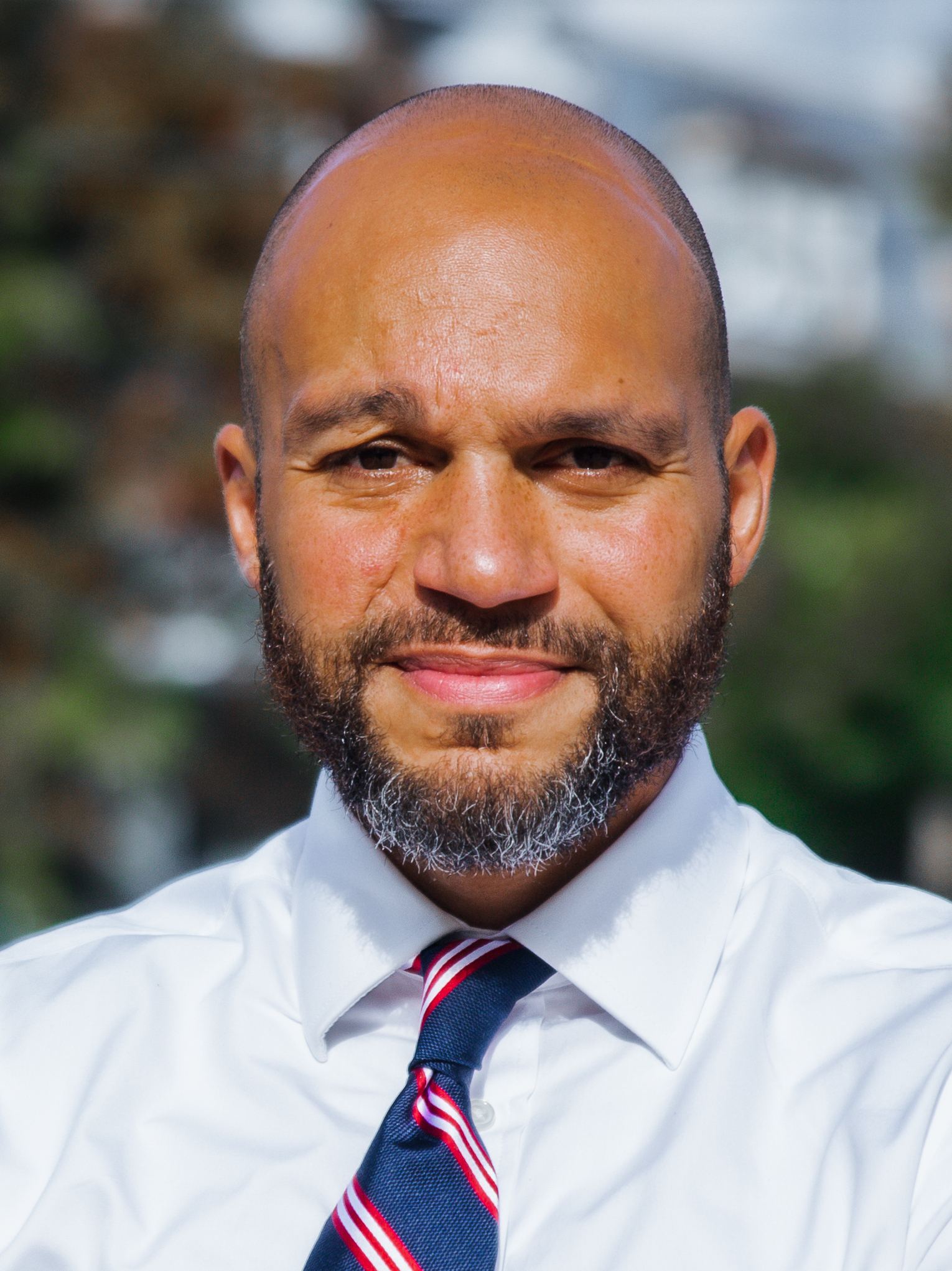

Nominee	Robert White	Denise Rosado	Kymone Freeman
Party	Democratic	Republican	DC Statehood Green
Popular vote	183,762	13,339	12,114
Percentage	87.3%	6.3%	5.8%
Delegate before election
Eleanor Holmes Norton
Democratic
Elected Delegate
Robert White
Democratic

The 2026 United States House of Representatives election in the District of Columbia was held on November 3, 2026, to elect a non-voting delegate to represent the District of Columbia in the United States House of Representatives. In January 2026, incumbent Democratic delegate Eleanor Holmes Norton announced that she would not seek reelection to a 19th term. The primary elections were held on June 16.

Democratic candidate Robert White won the general election, defeating Republican candidate Denise Rosado and DC Statehood Green Party candidate Kymone Freeman.

== Democratic primary ==
Incumbent delegate Eleanor Holmes Norton stated that she was running for re-election in June 2025, however her staff denied that a final decision had been made. Her office has had to walk back several statements that she has made to reporters as well. She officially announced her re-election bid on September 4, 2025, and her staff stated that they had nothing to add.

Norton faced calls to retire from figures like Representative Jamie Raskin and Norton's former chief of staff (and later Democratic National Committee member) Donna Brazile. In October 2025, Norton was the victim of fraud, and the ensuing police report stated she suffered from "early stages of dementia" and that a caretaker held power of attorney over her. Eventually, Norton terminated her re-election campaign on January 25, 2026.

=== Candidates ===
==== Nominee ====
- Robert White, at-large councilmember (2016–present) and candidate for mayor in 2022

==== Eliminated in primary ====
- Trent Holbrook, former senior legislative counsel for incumbent Eleanor Holmes Norton
- Gregory Jaczko, former chairman of the Nuclear Regulatory Commission (2009–2012)
- Brooke Pinto, councilmember from Ward 2 (2020–present)
- Kinney Zalesne, deputy national finance chair of the Democratic National Committee and former counsel at the Department of Justice

==== Withdrawn ====
- Deirdre Brown, former Advisory Neighborhood Commissioner
- Gordon Chaffin, former congressional staffer
- Robert Matthews, director of the District of Columbia Child and Family Services Agency
- Greg Maye, candidate for this seat in 2022
- Vincent Morris, former spokesperson to Senator Bernie Sanders and former mayor Tony Williams
- Eleanor Holmes Norton, incumbent delegate
- Jacque Patterson, president of the District of Columbia State Board of Education (running for council)
- Sandi Stevens
- Kelly Mikel Williams, podcast host and candidate for this seat in 2022 and 2024

=== Endorsements ===
Brooke Pinto

U.S. senators

- Angela Alsobrooks, Maryland (2025–present)
- Richard Blumenthal, Connecticut (2011–present)

Local officials

- Anita Bonds, at-large councilmember (2012–present)
- Mary Cheh, former councilmember from the 3rd ward (2007–2023)
- Charlene Drew Jarvis, former councilmember from the 4th ward (1979–2001)
- Bill Lightfoot, former at-large councilmember (1989–1997)

Organizations

- Restaurant Association of Greater Washington
Robert White

U.S. senators

- Elizabeth Warren, Massachusetts (2013–present)

U.S. representatives

- Greg Casar, TX-35 (2023–present)
- Jim Clyburn, SC-06 (1993–present)
- Maxwell Frost, FL-10 (2023–present)
- Pramila Jayapal, WA-07 (2017–present)
- Gregory Meeks, NY-05 (1998–present)

Local officials

- Charles Allen, councilmember from the 6th ward (2015–present)
- Janeese Lewis George, councilmember from the 4th ward (2021–present)

Labor unions

- American Federation of Government Employees
- AFL-CIO Metropolitan Washington Council
- Amalgamated Transit Union Local 689
- Committee of Interns and Residents

Organizations

- Capital Stonewall Democrats
- Congressional Black Caucus
- Congressional Progressive Caucus
- Free DC
- Greater Greater Washington
- Jews United for Justice
- Our Revolution D.C.

Political parties

- Working Families Party
Kinney Zalesne

Executive branch officials

- Eric Holder, former U.S. attorney general (2009–2015)

U.S. representatives

- Josh Gottheimer, NJ-05 (2017–present)
- Teresa Leger Fernández, NM-03 (2021–present)
- Suhas Subramanyam, VA-10 (2025–present)

Party officials

- Jaime Harrison, former chair of the Democratic National Committee (2021–2025)

Newspapers

- Washington Jewish Week

=== Fundraising ===
Campaign finance reports as of March 31, 2026
Candidate	Raised	Spent	Cash on hand
Brooke Pinto (D)	$1,252,427	$431,768	$820,659
Gordon Chaffin (D)	$24,351	$21,805	$2,545
Kelly Mikel Williams (D)	$3,962,768	$1,841	$3,959,482
Robert White (D)	$414,432	$340,943	$73,488
Kinney Zalesne (D)	$752,831	$286,247	$466,584
Robert Matthews (D)	$49,078	$430	$48,647
Source: Federal Election Commission

=== Polling ===
Poll source	Date(s) administered	Sample size (Note: Key: A – all adults RV – registered voters LV – likely voters V – unclear)	Margin of error	Deirdre Brown	Trent Holbrook	Eleanor Holmes-Norton	Gregory Jaczko	Robert White	Jacque Patterson	Brooke Pinto	Kinney Zalesne	Other	Undecided
City Cast DC/True Dot	May 12–17, 2026	487 (RV)	± 4.4%	–	5%	–	2%	38%	–	21%	4%	1% (Note: "Would not vote" with 1%)	29%
Lake Research Partners (D) (Note: Poll sponsored by White's campaign)	November 22–24, 2025	400 (LV)	± 4.9%	2%	–	16%	–	29%	1%	14%	1%	5% (Note: 'Someone else' with 5%)	31%

=== Results ===
Results by ward: White—70–80% White—60–70% White—40–50%

Democratic primary results
Party	Candidate	Votes	%
Democratic	Robert White	86,871	63.61
Democratic	Brooke Pinto	28,550	20.90
Democratic	Kinney Zalesne	10,666	7.81
Democratic	Trent Holbrook	6,100	4.47
Democratic	Greg Jaczko	3,936	2.88
Write-in		455	0.33
Total votes		136,578	100.00
n/a	Overvotes	539	
n/a	Undervotes	4,961	

== Statehood Green primary ==
=== Candidates ===
==== Nominee ====
- Kymone Freeman, radio host and nominee for this seat in 2024

=== Results ===
Statehood Green primary
Party	Candidate	Votes	%
DC Statehood Green	Kymone Freeman	607	77.72
Write-in		174	22.28
Total votes		781	100.00
n/a	Overvotes	3	
n/a	Undervotes	96	

== Republican primary ==
=== Candidates ===
==== Nominee ====
- Denise Rosado, attorney

==== Did not make ballot ====
- Nelson Rimensnyder, perennial candidate
- Gavin Solomon, businessman from New York

=== Fundraising ===
Campaign finance reports as of March 31, 2026
Candidate	Raised	Spent	Cash on hand
Denise Rosado (R)	$6,188	$1,062	$5,057
Source: Federal Election Commission

=== Results ===
Republican primary results
Party	Candidate	Votes	%
Republican	Denise Rosado	2,501	88.50
Write-in		325	11.50
Total votes		2,826	100.00
n/a	Overvotes	13	
n/a	Undervotes	415	

== General election ==
=== Fundraising ===
Campaign finance reports as of October 14, 2026
Candidate	Raised	Spent	Cash on hand
Robert White (D)	$1,040,274	$950,610	$95,342
Denise Rosado (R)	$6,188	$1,063	$5,057
Source: Federal Election Commission

=== Results ===
2026 United States House of Representatives election in the District of Columbia
Party	Candidate	Votes	%
Democratic	Robert White		
DC Statehood Green	Kymone Freeman		
Republican	Denise Rosado		
Write-in			
Total votes			100.00

== See also ==
- United States House of Representatives elections in the District of Columbia

== Notes ==
Partisan clients
