= Musue Noha Haddad =

Liberian journalist

- Born: December 17, 1968
- Died: November 25, 2013 (aged 44); Monrovia, Liberia
- Occupations: Journalist and photojournalist
- Notable credit(s): Ghanaian Women and Children in Health and Development; Ghanaian Funerals; A Day in the Lives of Two Teenage Mothers

Musue Noha Haddad (December 17, 1968 – November 25, 2013) was a Liberian journalist and photojournalist.

== Early life ==
Haddad was born on December 17, 1968.

== Career ==
Haddad began her journalism career while in exile in Accra, Ghana, while the First Liberian Civil War raged in her home country. In Ghana she undertook several photojournalism projects, including A Day in the Lives of Two Teenage Mothers, a documentary on the lives of two teenagers and their children, considering the impact of teenage pregnancy on mothers, their children, and society. The project led to a three-day photographic exhibition in 2005. Haddad's next photojournalism project, Ghanaian Women and Children in Health and Development, resulted in an exhibition to commemorate UNICEF's 50th anniversary of operations in Accra. In 1996 she also collaborated on a photojournalism research project, Ghanaian Funerals. The project climaxed with an 11-day photo exhibition and 47-page book published in Germany.

Haddad returned to Liberia in early 1997 to become a Staff Writer for The News, an independent national daily newspaper. At The News Haddad wrote articles critical of the government and provided information that the government had tried to suppress. In 1998, following articles Haddad wrote about a visit she made to the United States in 1998, she was accused of spying for the CIA; she received death threats and physical attacks, and left for exile in the United States. A number of her colleagues at The News were imprisoned in February 2001, and Haddad advocated internationally for their release. In exile, she highlighted human rights situation in her country, drawing the international community's attention to the situation.

In the US, Haddad served as a Hubert Humphrey Fellow at the Merrill School of Journalism, University of Maryland, College Park. In 2000 she was a visiting scholar at the Columbia University Center for the Study of Human Rights. In 2006 Haddad completed a Master of International Policy and Practice degree at George Washington University's Elliott School of International Affairs.

== Awards ==
In Ghana Haddad received the Nelson Mandela Award for Best Student in Photojournalism from the Ghana Institute of Journalism.. On her return to Liberia she received the 1998/1999 awards for "Journalist of the Year" and "Photo-Journalist of the Year"..

In 2001 she also received a Human Rights Award from the United Nations Association of the National Capital Area (UNA-NCA) for her “outstanding dedication and service towards the recognition, promotion and protection of the inherent dignity and equal and inalienable rights of all members of the human family.” She was also nominated for the International Women's Media Foundation (IWMF) 2001 Courage in Journalism Award, which recognizes women journalists who risk their lives in the course of reporting.

In 2002 Haddad received a Human Rights Watch Hellmann-Hammett Award, granted to writers around the world who have been the targets of political persecution. Stephanie Robinson, Staff Attorney at the Lawyers' Committee for Human Rights (renamed Human Rights First) Washington offices, said her organization had become familiar with Ms. Haddad and were proud of her commitment, adding “Haddad has remained consistent in highlighting human rights situations in her country despite attempts to discredit her extraordinary work.”.

== Death ==
Haddad died suddenly in Monrovia on November 25, 2013.
