= Doni Crawford =

American politician

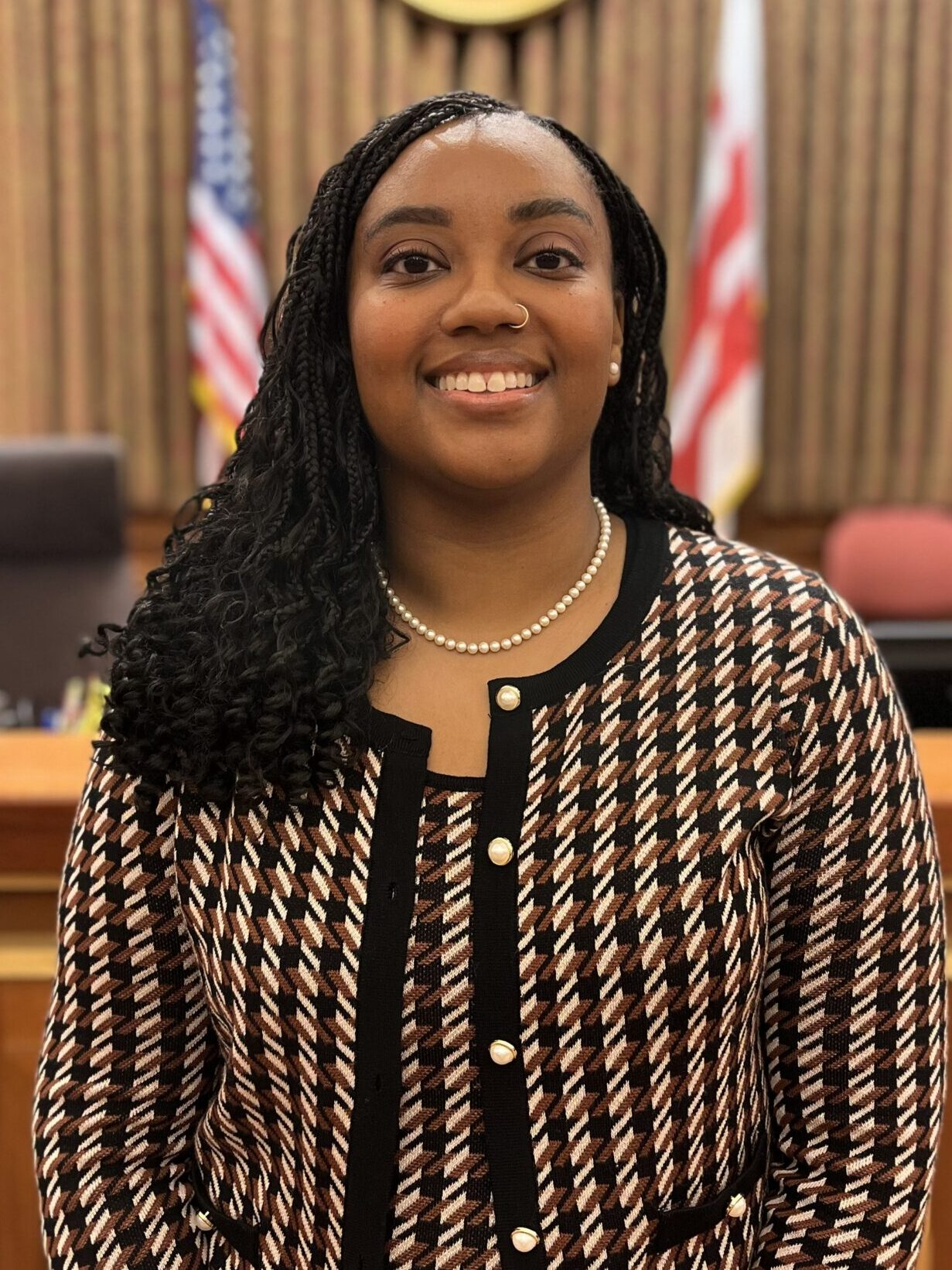
- Official portrait, 2026

Member of the Council of the District of Columbia from the at-large district
- In office January 20, 2026 – July 17, 2026
- Preceded by: Kenyan McDuffie
- Succeeded by: Elissa Silverman

Personal details
- Born: 1989 or 1990 (age 36–37)
- Party: Democratic (before 2025); Independent (2025–present)
- Education: University of Pittsburgh (BA, MPA)

Doni Crawford (born 1989 or 1990) is an American politician who served as an at-large member of the Council of the District of Columbia from January 2026 to July 2026. She was appointed to succeed Kenyan McDuffie, whom she was previously a staffer for, after he resigned to run in the 2026 Washington, D.C., mayoral election. Crawford lost to former councilmember Elissa Silverman in a June 2026 special election to finish McDuffie's term.

== Early life and career ==
Crawford graduated from the University of Pittsburgh with a Bachelor of Arts in political science and Spanish language as well as a Master of Public Affairs and International Affairs.

Crawford joined Pittsburgh community nonprofit Neighborhood Allies in August 2014 as a community data and policy fellow, then was hired as a program coordinator and promoted to program manager in January 2017. In January 2019, she joined the D.C. Fiscal Policy Institute as a policy analyst. In March 2022, she joined the office of District of Columbia Councilmember Kenyan McDuffie's office as a policy advisor, then as his legislative director and director for the council's business economic development committee.

== Council of the District of Columbia ==
On January 17, 2026, NBC Washington reported that inside sources had confirmed that Crawford was selected to succeed McDuffie, who resigned in order to run in the 2026 Washington, D.C., mayoral election. She was unanimously appointed to the council on January 20, 2026, a day after chair Phil Mendelson announced her nomination. She will hold the seat until a special election to be held June 16, 2026; she originally declined to state if she would run, then announced her campaign for it on February 12, 2026.

Election night results for the June 16, 2026 special election showed Crawford with around 25% of the vote, trailing former councilmember Elissa Silverman who had more than 52% of the vote. Crawford conceded to Silverman on the day after the election.

== Personal life ==
Crawford resides in the Carver Langston neighborhood in Northeast Washington D.C.. She was previously a Democrat, but re-registered to Independent in the fall of 2025 in anticipation of being appointed to succeed McDuffie.

== Electoral history ==
2026 Council of the District of Columbia special election results
Party	Candidate	Votes	%
Independent	Elissa Silverman	73,246	55.36
Independent	Doni Crawford (incumbent)	34,080	25.76
Independent	Jacque Patterson	23,487	17.75
Write-in		1,499	1.13
Total votes		132,312	100.00
n/a	Overvotes	666	
n/a	Undervotes	21,997	
