= 2020 Council of the District of Columbia special election =

Local election in the United States

2020 District of Columbia Ward 2 Special Election
- June 16, 2020
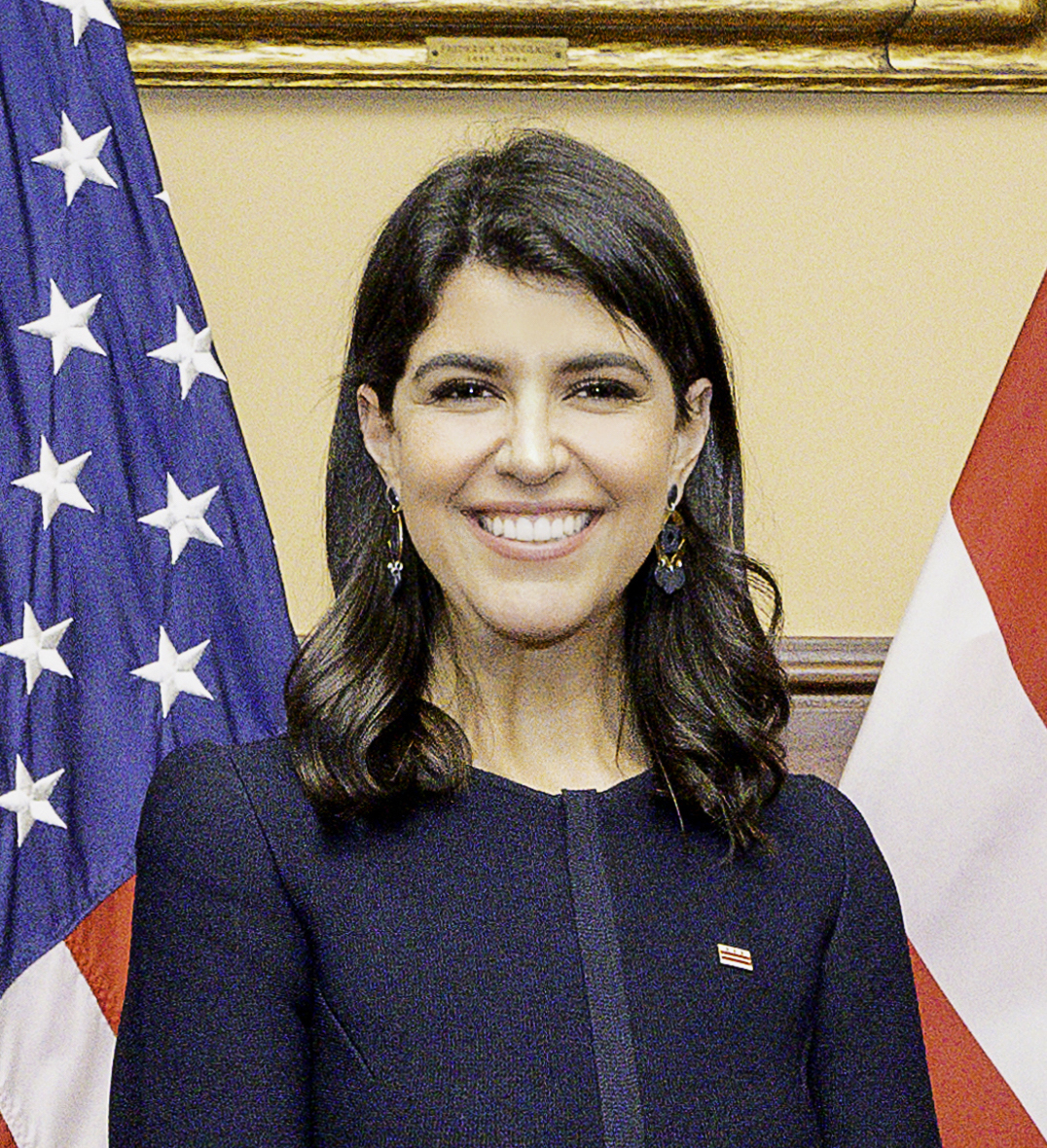

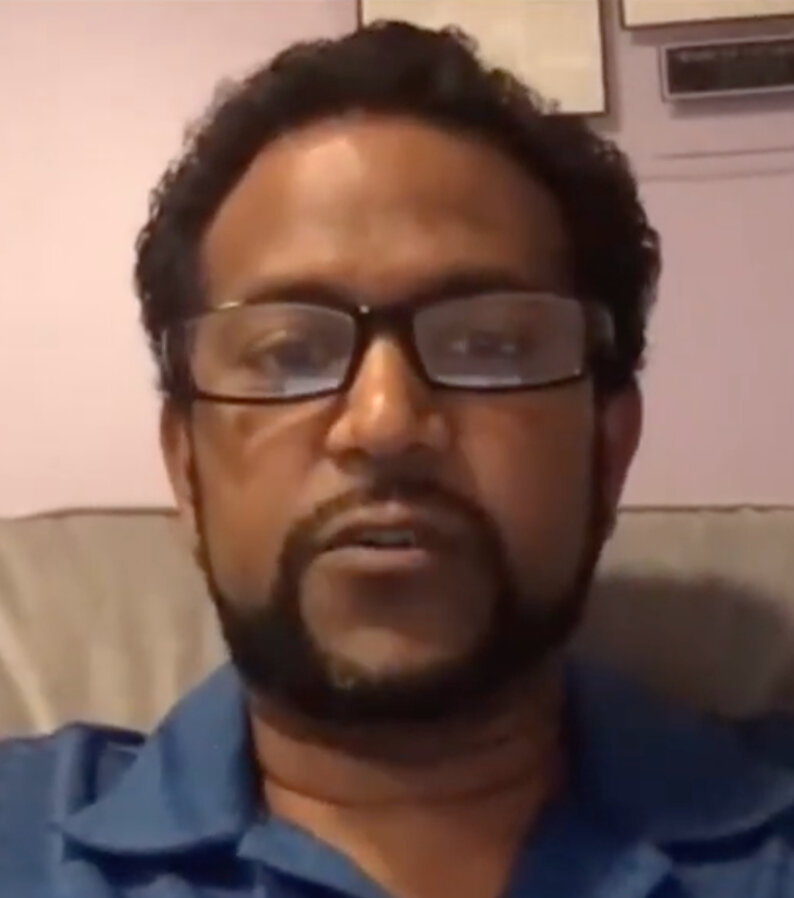

Nominee	Brooke Pinto	Patrick Kennedy	Jordan Grossman
Party	Democratic	Democratic	Democratic
Popular vote	4,554	2,159	1,563
Percentage	42.67%	20.23%	14.65%
Nominee	Kishan Putta	Katherine Venice	John Fanning
Party	Democratic	Republican	Democratic
Popular vote	895	549	488
Percentage	8.39%	5.14%	4.57%
Councilmember before election
Vacant
Elected Councilmember
Brooke Pinto
Democratic

The 2020 Council of the District of Columbia special election was held on June 16, 2020, to elect the position of Ward 2 Councilmember to the Council of the District of Columbia. The election was called following the resignation of incumbent councilmember Jack Evans due to his ongoing corruption scandals.

== Background ==
A recall attempt had been made against incumbent councilmember Jack Evans in 2019, but the District of Columbia Board of Elections ruled that the recall campaign couldn't collect signatures due to them not filing the proper campaign finance paperwork. Evans, who had been on Council continuously since his first election in 1991 and set the record for longest serving Councilmember, resigned on January 17, 2020 while under investigation for ethics violations and after all twelve other members voted unanimously to recommend his expulsion. His resignation caused a special election to be held. Evans announced that he would run in the special election on January 28, but later dropped out of the special election while remaining in the Democratic primary for the general election in November.

== Candidates ==
=== Democratic Party ===
- John Fanning, ANC commissioner from 2F
- Jordan Grossman, former legislative assistant to U.S. Senator Amy Klobuchar
- Patrick Kennedy, ANC commissioner from 2A
- Brooke Pinto, former assistant attorney general of the District of Columbia
- Kishan Putta, ANC commissioner from 2E and at-large candidate for council in 2014
- Yilin Zhang, business executive

=== Republican Party ===
- Katherine Venice, CEO of venture capital firm Ethical Capitalism Group

== General Election ==
2020 Council of the District of Columbia Ward 2 special election
Party	Candidate	Votes	%
Democratic	Brooke Pinto	4,554	42.67%
Democratic	Patrick Kennedy	2,159	20.23%
Democratic	Jordan Grossman	1,563	14.65%
Democratic	Kishan Putta	895	8.39%
Republican	Katherine Venice	549	5.14%
Democratic	John Fanning	488	4.57%
Democratic	Yilin Zhang	382	3.58%
Write-in		82	0.77%
Total votes		10,672	100.00%
