= DCist =

American news and culture website

- The District's (unofficial) homepage.
- Owner: WAMU/American University
- Founder(s): Rob Goodspeed, Mike Grass
- Founded: 2004; 22 years ago
- Ceased publication: 2017; 2024
- City: Washington, D.C.
- Country: United States
- Website: dcist.com
- Free online archives: www.dclibrary.org/research-and-learn/dcist-archive

DCist was a local news website that focused on the District of Columbia. The site began as a volunteer-run blog focused on Washington, D.C., in the same family of "-ist" websites as Gothamist, LAist, and Chicagoist. A professional editor began steering the publication in 2007 as it became a go-to news source.

The staff grew to three people by the time billionaire Joe Ricketts purchased the company in early 2017. Several months later, Ricketts shut all of the websites down after newsroom staff in New York voted to unionize.

D.C. public radio station WAMU joined KPCC (FM) in and WNYC to purchase several of the respective sites from Ricketts in a bid to expand the radio stations' digital audiences. DCist relaunched in 2018.

After operating as separate teams for two years, WAMU's local newsroom and DCist began collaborating as a single team during the COVID-19 pandemic and announced a multiyear plan to reshape its news division and provide more in-depth coverage of the Washington metropolitan area.

However, within three years the public radio station divested from local news by eliminating 16 positions. Following the layoffs, several former DCist workers created a new digital news outlet, The 51st.

The day that DCist stopped publishing, WAMU implemented a pop-up message that redirected visitors away from the DCist website, effectively preventing access to its 20-year archive. After significant public pressure, WAMU removed the redirect and allowed access to the DCist archives, promising they would remain available for at least one year. After one year, DCist.com was still hosted by WAMU and no plan had been announced for its permanent archive. But Washington City Paper media columnist Vince Morris posted on social media that District of Columbia Public Library is in the process of acquiring rights to the site from American University. In the meantime, the library has created a page for the site archives to help readers access Wayback Machine copies of articles of every DCist article.
