= Anise Jenkins =

African-American D.C. statehood activist

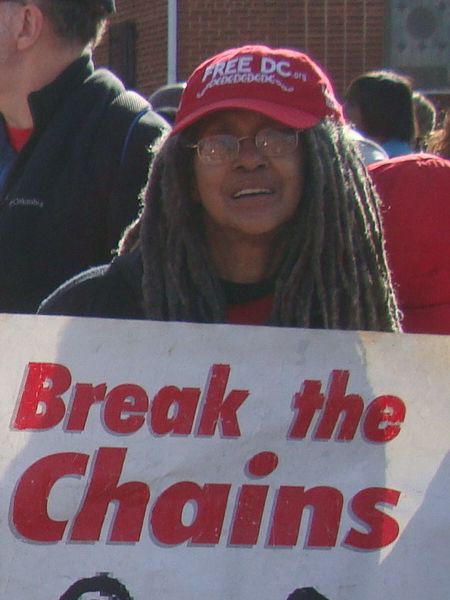
- Jenkins at a Martin Luther King Jr. Day statehood rally in January 2013.
- Born: c. March 1949 (age 76); Washington, D.C., United States
- Education: Howard University
- Occupations: D.C. statehood activist, documentary filmmaker

Anise Jenkins (born c. March 1949) is an American activist in the Statehood movement in the District of Columbia and serves as the executive director of Stand Up! for Democracy in DC (Free DC).

== Early life and education ==
Anise Jenkins was born in Washington, D.C. on August 28, 1949. Jenkins's father was also born in Washington, D.C., and identified as an African American Republican.

Jenkins graduated from Western High School (now Duke Ellington School of the Arts) and later attended Howard University where she received a Bachelor of Arts degree in political science followed by a Masters in Business Administration.

== Activism ==
Jenkins became active in the fight for D.C. statehood in the late 1990s following the creation of the District of Columbia Financial Control Board. The officials on the D.C. Control Board were appointed by the President of the United States and had the power to override decisions by locally elected officials on issues regarding taxation and spending. This lead Jenkins to organize with ministers, local activists and students at Howard University and the University of the District of Columbia. At first, the group met in the basement of the Rainbow/PUSH coalition offices in Washington. Later, the group met at the offices of the National Council of Negro Women where they had the support of the organization's then-CEO and president Dorothy Height.

One of the group's first actions was to target the re-election of Lauch Faircloth, United States Senator from North Carolina, who supported the creation of the D.C. Control Board. As a result, Faircloth was given the derogatory nickname of "D.C.'s overseer", which is attributable to Jenkins's description of the District of Columbia as the "last plantation" in the United States. Jenkins's group rallied D.C. residents with family members in North Carolina to note vote for the Senator in the 1998 United States elections. Faircloth was defeated that year.

Jenkins has been arrested nine times in relation to her activism on the issue of D.C. statehood. One of the arrests took place during the arrest of a larger group of 41 people in April 2011, including then-D.C. Mayor Vincent C. Gray and members of the Council of the District of Columbia, who were protesting Congressional action to overturn locally enacted laws. Jenkins and other members of the group were recognized by the District of Columbia's non-voting delegate, Eleanor Holmes Norton, on the floor of Congress on April 15, 2011, to honor their commitment to D.C. home rule.

== Recognition ==
Jenkins has been recognized for her activism in relation to human rights and the promotion of democracy in the District of Columbia. The Washington Informer named Jenkins as one of the 50 most influential people in Washington, DC in 2013. She was also the recipient of a Trailblazer Award from the National Congress of Black Women in 2005, and received Human Rights Community Award from the United Nations Association of the National Capital Area.

Jenkins is also notable for her appearance at rallies and protests in relation to D.C. statehood and is distinctive for her long dreadlocks hair style covered by a red or black baseball cap emblazoned with the "FREE DC" slogan.
