= Jamal Holtz =

American politician and party official

- Holtz in 2026

Member of the Council of the District of Columbia from the at-large district
- Incumbent
- Assumed office November 9, 2026
- Preceded by: Robert White

Personal details
- Born: 1997 or 1998 (age 28–29) Washington, D.C., U.S.
- Party: Democratic
- Education: University of Rochester (BA)

Jamal Holtz (born 1998/1999) is an American politician and party official serving on the Council of the District of Columbia since 2026. He is president of the Washington, D.C. chapter of Young Democrats of America and a lead organizer of 51 for 51 coalition advocating for D.C. statehood.

== Early life and education ==
Holtz was born in 1997 or 1998 and raised in Ward 8 of Washington, D.C.. He is a fourth-generation Washingtonian. He is one of five siblings raised by a single mother. Holtz lost a brother to gun violence and has experienced homelessness and living out of a car. His family moved frequently due to his mother's difficulty affording housing.

Holtz participated in the Marion Barry Youth Leadership Institute and worked in the city’s employment department and mayor Muriel Bowser’s office. He graduated from Friendship Collegiate Academy Public Charter School. He earned a Posse Foundation scholarship and became a first-generation college student, attending the University of Rochester. He designed his own major on social justice and public policy. Holtz graduated in 2020 and served as the student body president.

== Career ==
In the mid-2010s, Holtz was denied medical treatment because of the type of insurance he had. This resulted in a permanent scar on the back of his head. During the debate at the time surrounding defunding the Affordable Care Act, he wanted to contact his senators to advocate but then realized D.C. residents have none. This experience moved him to co-organize 51 for 51. It is an activist coalition that supports changing the Senate filibuster to allow D.C. statehood legislation to pass with a simple majority. Holtz's activism was included in filmmaker Hannah Rosenzweig's 2024 documentary 51st State. As of 2024, he continues to advocate for passage of versions of the John Lewis Voting Rights Act that include D.C. statehood.

Holtz served as the chief of staff and executive vice president of LINK Strategic Partners. He is president of the Washington, D.C. chapter of Young Democrats of America.

On November 9, 2026, Holtz was appointed by the District of Columbia Democratic State Committee to temporarily fill the at-large seat on the D.C. Council following Robert White's election to the U.S. Congress. He had not asked for the position and has stated he does not intend to run for the special election scheduled for April 6, 2027. He is the first Generation Z lawmaker in the city.
