= Administrative Law Review =

- Discipline: Administrative law
- Language: English
- Edited by: Mia D. Simon

Publication details
- History: 1948–present
- Publisher: Washington College of Law and American Bar Association Section of Administrative Law & Regulatory Practice (United States)
- Frequency: Quarterly
- Impact factor: 1.38 (2025)

Standard abbreviations
- Bluebook: Admin. L. Rev.
- ISO 4: Adm. Law Rev.

Indexing
- ISSN: 0001-8368
- LCCN: sf82003051
- OCLC no.: 01461100

Links
- Journal homepage; Online access

The Administrative Law Review was established in 1948 and is the official law journal of the American Bar Association Section of Administrative Law & Regulatory Practice.

== Overview ==
The journal is a quarterly publication managed and edited by approximately 100 students at the Washington College of Law and published by the ABA. The current editor-in-chief is Mia D. Simon.

The journal is ranked 45th out of 1,556 nationally ranked law journals. For specialty law journals, the journal is ranked 4th out of 1,224. In the category of Administrative Law, it is ranked 2nd. The journal has been cited by the Supreme Court of the United States, United States Court of Appeals for the District of Columbia Circuit (which is known as the administrative law circuit), and since 2000 has been cited by the Second, Third, Fourth, Fifth, Sixth, Seventh, Ninth, Tenth, and Eleventh Circuit Courts of Appeal. The ALR has also been cited by multiple state supreme courts.

In addition to the print publication, the journal has an online publication called The ALR Accord and a podcast on current topics in administrative law called A Hard Look.

== Abstracting and indexing ==
The journal is abstracted and indexed in:

- Current Contents/Social and Behavioral Sciences
- EBSCO databases
- HeinOnline
- ProQuest databases
- Scopus
- Social Sciences Citation Index

According to the Journal Citation Reports, the journal has a 2019 impact factor of 2.059.

== Admissions ==
The journal selects staff members based on a competitive exercise that tests candidates on their editing, research, legal-analysis, and legal-writing skills. There is not a preset number of accepted candidates each year; recent classes of new editors have ranged from about 45 to 50. The candidate "write-on" exercise is distributed to candidates during their second semester at the law school. An optional "grade-on" process allows students to become staff members based solely on their grades. Transfer students are also eligible for admission through a fall write-on process.

== Notable Citations ==
United States Supreme Court
Chiles v. Salazar	2026
Learning Resources v. Trump	2026
FCC v. Consumers' Research	2025
Bondi v. Vanderstok	2025
Loper Bright v. Raimondo	2024
Biden v. Nebraska	2023
West Virginia v. EPA	2022
Buffington v. McDonough	2022
DHS v. Regents of University of California	2020
Biestek v. Berryhill	2019
Paul v. United States	2019
Kisor v. Wilkie	2019

== Notable Alumni ==
- Robert White (Washington, D.C., politician), Volume 59
- Andrew Guhr, Director and Associate General Counsel, Infrastructure and Telecomm at Meta, Volume 61

== Editors in Chief ==
Mia D. Simon	2026-2027	Volume 79
Matt Floyd	2025-2026	Volume 78
Jason D'Antonio	2024-2025	Volume 77
Madison Gestiehr	2023-2024	Volume 76
Jacob W. Wohl	2022-2023	Volume 75
Caroline Trabucco	2021-2022	Volume 74
Sara Talebian	2020-2021	Volume 73
Emily Osofsky	2019-2020	Volume 72
Caroline Raschbaum	2018-2019	Volume 71
Jonathan Heinz	2017-2018	Volume 70
Ross Handler	2016-2017	Volume 69
Neil Murphy	2015-2016	Volume 68
Wenxi Li	2014-2015	Volume 67
Sara Lacy	2013-2014	Volume 66
Andy Kawel	2008-2009	Volume 61
