= Brooke Pinto =

American attorney and politician

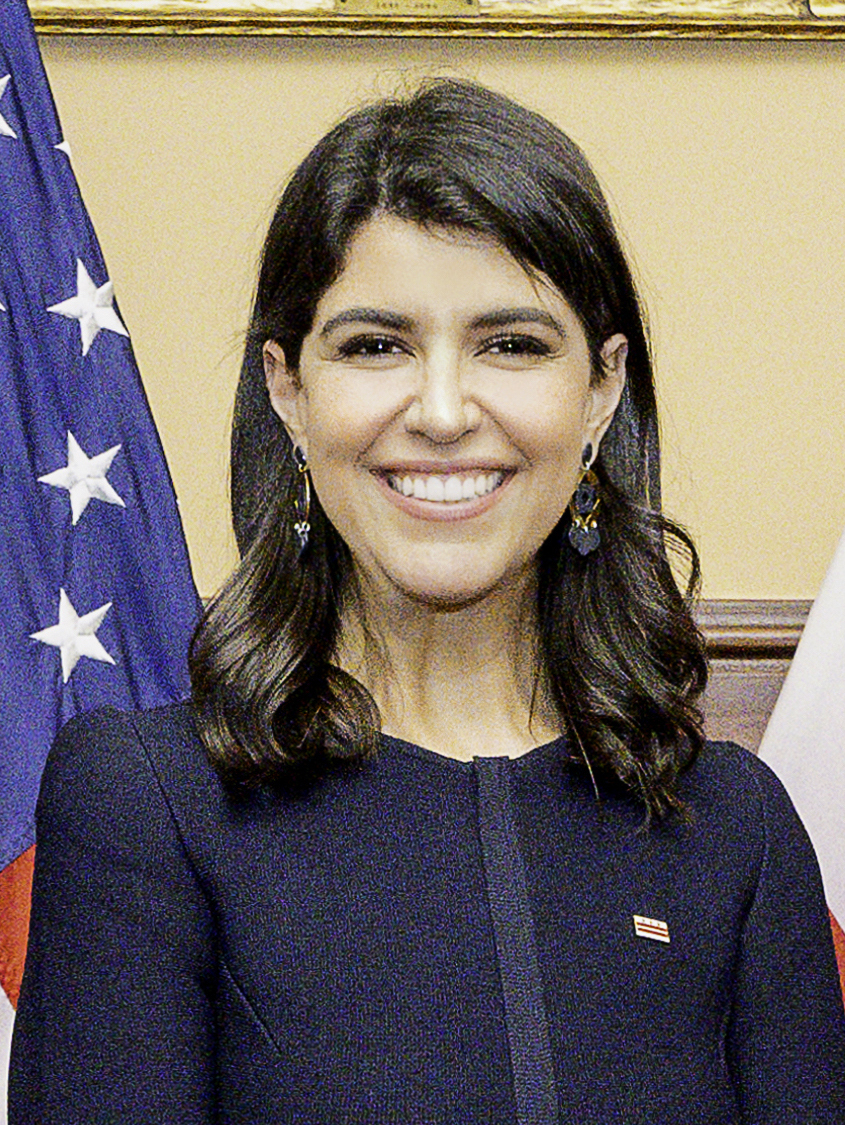
- Official portrait, 2024

Member of the Council of the District of Columbia from Ward 2
- Incumbent
- Assumed office June 27, 2020
- Preceded by: Jack Evans

Personal details
- Born: May 25, 1992 (age 34) Greenwich, Connecticut, U.S.
- Party: Democratic
- Education: Cornell University (BA); Georgetown University (JD)
- Website: Official website

Brooke Pinto (born May 25, 1992) is an American attorney and politician who has served on the Council of the District of Columbia since 2020. She won the special election to succeed Jack Evans and is the youngest council member in the District's history and the first woman to represent Ward 2.

== Early life and education ==
Born in Greenwich, Connecticut, Pinto is the daughter of James Pinto, a private equity investor who heads MVC Capital. She attended Cornell University and completed a degree in business and hospitality administration. She then moved to Washington, D.C. to attend Georgetown University Law School, where she earned a Juris Doctor in 2017.

== Career ==
After graduating from law school, Pinto worked for Attorney General for the District of Columbia Karl Racine through a one-year fellowship, after which he hired her as assistant attorney general for policy and legislative affairs. She helped craft legislation to address hate crimes and deceptive charity practices. She left that position after one year to launch her campaign for Council of the District of Columbia.

=== 2020 campaign for the D.C. Council ===
==== June 2020 Primary Election ====
In February 2020, Pinto announced her candidacy for Ward 2 Councilmember after incumbent Jack Evans resigned amidst an ethics scandal. Evans resigned before his colleagues could potentially expel him. As with other candidates, Pinto ran in the primary election for the Democratic nomination and the special election to fill the remainder of Evans' term.

Pinto was the last entrant into a crowded field that included Evans (who filed to run in both the primary and special elections just ten days after he resigned following multiple ethics violations). Pinto touted that she was the only candidate with business, tax, and legislative experience, which was needed in the wake of the COVID-19 pandemic. Karl Racine endorsed her campaign.

In early polls, Pinto trailed behind opponents with only two to three percent of the vote. However, after the Washington Post editorial board endorsed Pinto, claiming that she would provide a "needed new start," she began to gain momentum.

Pinto garnered support from Senator Richard Blumenthal, for whom she had previously interned, and to whom her father had donated $7,800 as well as Joe Kennedy III, who previously received $12,800 in donations from her father James Pinto.

Pinto pulled off a surprise victory, earning 28 percent of the vote in a field of eight candidates listed on the ballot and ultimately winning the Democratic primary by about 300 votes.

Following her June 2020 primary election victory, Washington City Paper reported that Pinto had never previously voted in a DC election. Among Ward 2 candidates, she had the lowest share of D.C. contributors and the most money from out-of-state donors. Pinto was the only candidate who did not participate in D.C.'s Fair Elections public financing program, which allowed her to self-fund $45,000 for her campaign. Pinto's funding of her campaign has been subject to scrutiny for allegations of campaign finance violations. However, those allegations have been dismissed by the DC Office of Campaign Finance.

June 2020 Special Election

In the June 16 special election to finish the remaining term on the vacant Ward 2 Council seat, Pinto won with 43 percent of the vote in a field of seven candidates.

==== November 2020 General Election ====
Pinto faced multiple challengers in the general election, focusing their campaigns on her finances and local expertise. Opponents included Peter Bolton, the D.C. Statehood Green Party candidate, and independents Martín Miguel Fernández and Randy Downs.

In 2021, Pinto was accused of breaking campaign finance laws in an effort to retire her campaign debts. At a $500-a-head fundraiser hosted by a Ward 2 developer, Pinto raised $21,000. That violated a DC law prohibiting candidates to pay off campaign debts by fundraising more than six months after being elected. Pinto said that, in meetings with the Office of Campaign Finance (OCF), she specifically asked if such a fundraiser would be permissible and that OCF officials did not raise any objections. OCF disputed this characterization.

=== Council member (2020-present) ===
In office, Pinto has established herself as a swing vote between the more progressive and the more moderate blocs. In her first term, Pinto introduced and passed legislation to streamline business licensing processes that support new and existing small and local businesses, expand access to menstrual health products, and increase access to public restrooms.

On December 21, 2022, Pinto was announced as the new chairwoman of the council's Committee on the Judiciary and Public Safety. That gave Pinto an influential position to address the crime rise in the city.

In April 2026, she introduced the HOMES Act, which would create a housing lease-to-own program, provide a tax credit for first time home buyers, and accelerate the lot splitting process.

During her tenure, Pinto has been subject to repeat campaign finance lawsuits filed by a Ward 2 resident known for being highly litigious.

=== 2026 Congressional Campaign ===
Pinto announced a campaign for the Delegate seat currently held by Eleanor Holmes Norton on October 6, 2025, three months before Norton announced she would not seek re-election amidst growing concerns surrounding her health.

Pinto faced fellow Councilmember Robert White in the June Democratic primary for the Delegate seat. She ultimately lost, capturing 21% of the vote compared to White's 64%.

== Electoral history ==
2020 Council of the District of Columbia, Ward 2, Democratic Primary Election
Party	Candidate	Votes	%
Democratic	Brooke Pinto	3,142	28
Democratic	Patrick Kennedy	2,763	25
Democratic	Jordan Grossman	2,385	22
Democratic	Kishan Putta	1,100	10
Democratic	John Fanning	695	6
Democratic	Yilin (Ellen) Zhang	473	4
Democratic	Jack Evans	376	3
Democratic	Daniel Hernandez	129	2
	Write-in	8	0

2020 Council of the District of Columbia, Ward 2, Democratic Special Election
Party	Candidate	Votes	%
Democratic	Brooke Pinto	4,554	43
Democratic	Patrick Kennedy	2,159	20
Democratic	Jordan Grossman	1,563	15
Democratic	Kishan Putta	895	8
Republican	Katherine Venice	549	5
Democratic	John Fanning	488	5
Democratic	Yilin (Ellen) Zhang	382	4
	Write-in	82	1

2026 United States House of Representatives election in the District of Columbia, Democratic primary
Party	Candidate	Votes	%
Democratic	Robert White	86,871	63.61
Democratic	Brooke Pinto	28,550	20.90
Democratic	Kinney Zalesne	10,666	7.81
Democratic	Trent Holbrook	6,100	4.47
Democratic	Greg Jaczko	3,936	2.88
Write-in		455	0.33
Total votes		136,578	100.00
n/a	Overvotes	539	
n/a	Undervotes	4,961	
