= 2026 Council of the District of Columbia special election =

- June 16, 2026
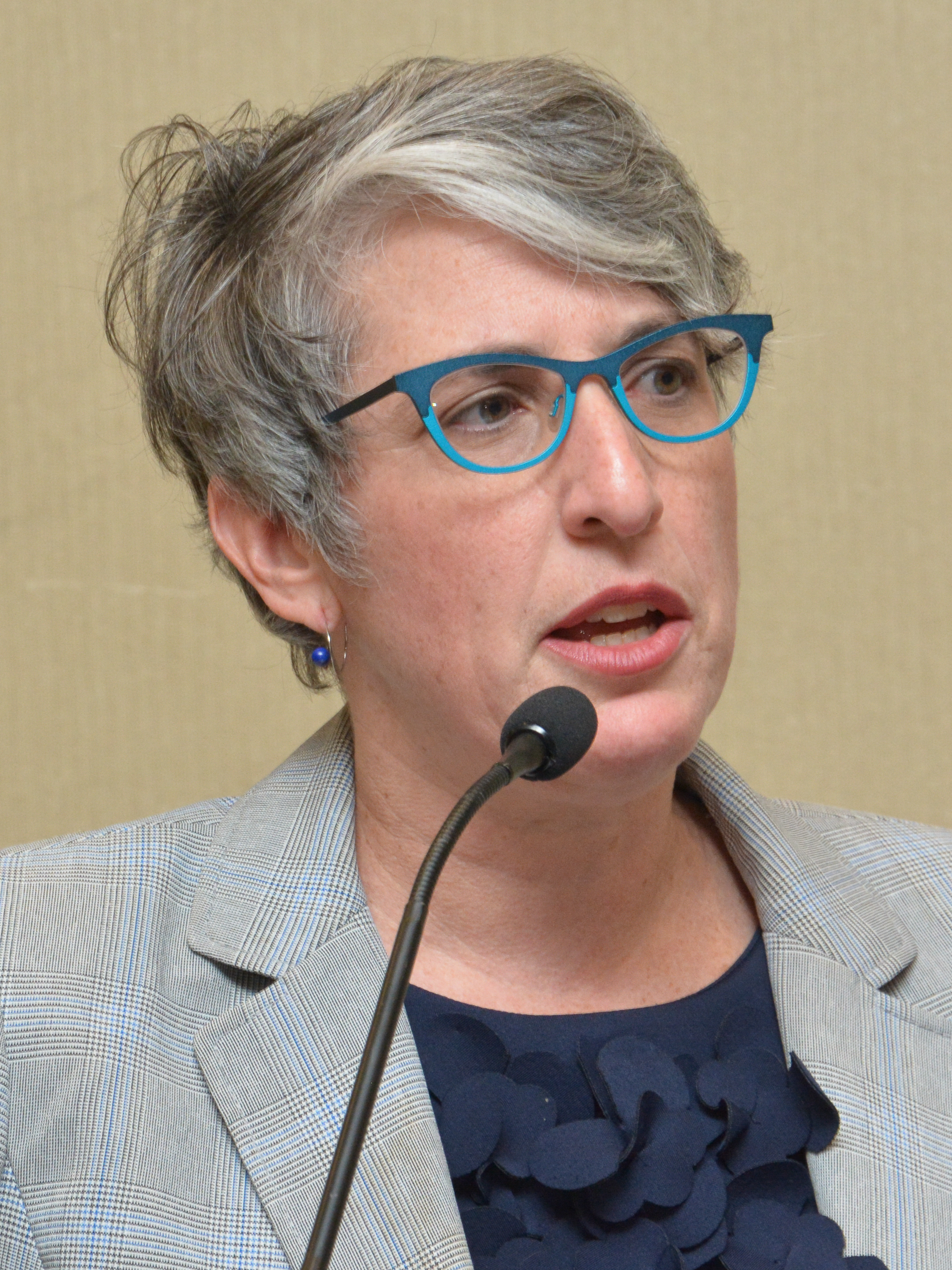

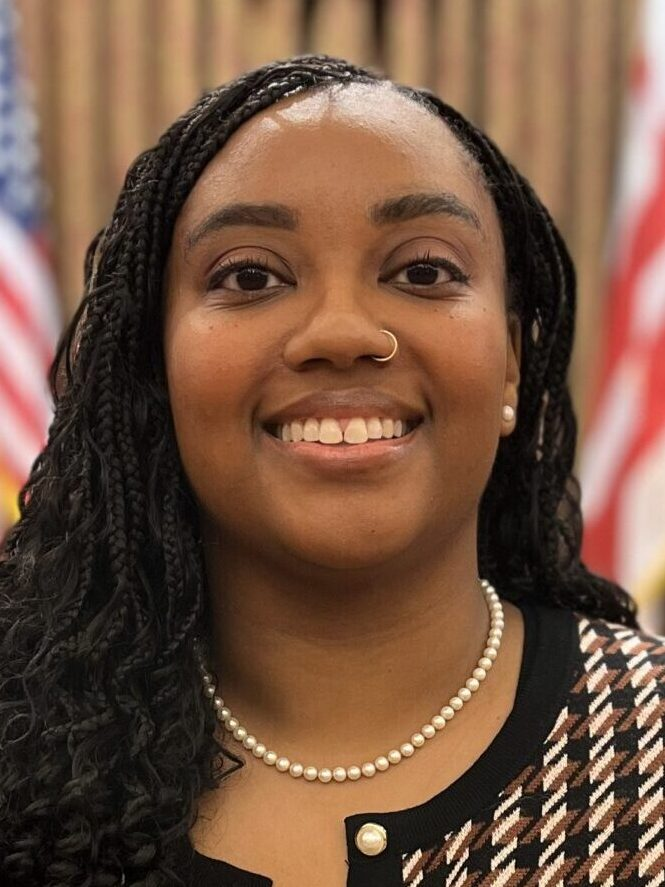

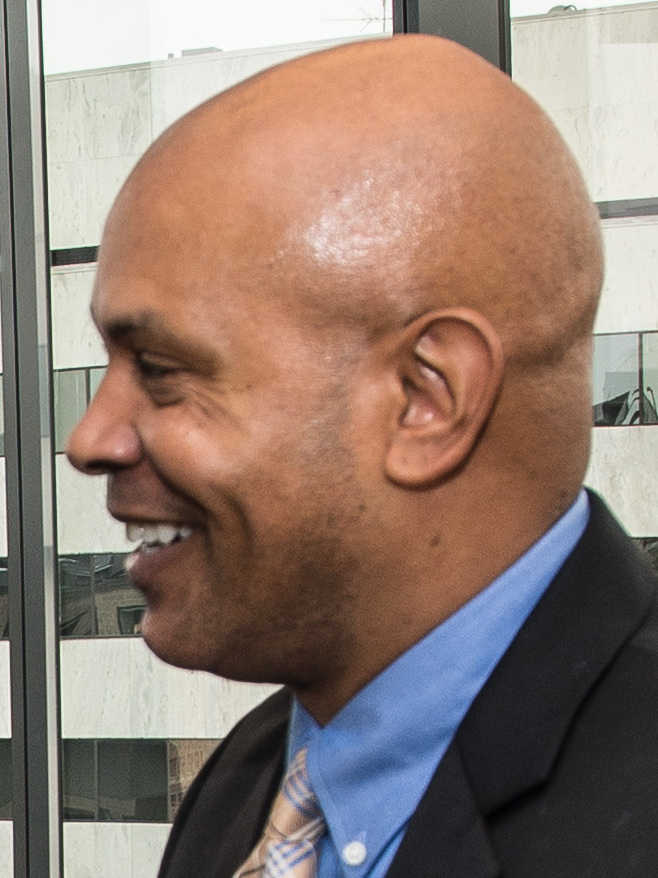
Candidate	Elissa Silverman	Doni Crawford	Jacque Patterson
Party	Independent	Independent	Independent
Popular vote	73,324	34,151	23,574
Percentage	55.32%	25.76%	17.78%
Councilmember before election
Doni Crawford
(appointed)
Independent
Elected Councilmember
Elissa Silverman
Independent

The 2026 Council of the District of Columbia special election was held on June 16, 2026, to elect one at-large member to the Council of the District of Columbia. Interim councilmember Doni Crawford was appointed to the position following the resignation of Kenyan McDuffie.

== Background ==
Incumbent councilmember Kenyan McDuffie was first elected in 2022 with 22% of the vote. He announced in January 2026 that he would run for mayor in the upcoming election. Prior to his announcement, he resigned from the council on January 5, 2026. Doni Crawford, who worked as a staffer for McDuffie, was appointed to the vacancy. A special election was scheduled upon McDuffie's resignation, to be held on June 16, concurrent with the city's primary election.

=== Applied to be appointed ===
In total, 42 individuals submitted applications for McDuffie's seat. Applicants included:

- Kwame Brown, former chairman of the Council of the District of Columbia (2011–2012) and at-large councilmember (2005–2011)
- Doni Crawford, advisor to outgoing councilmember Kenyan McDuffie (eventual appointee)
- Allister Chang, member of the District of Columbia State Board of Education from Ward 2
- Jack Evans, former councilmember from Ward 2 (1991–2020)
- Amy Mauro, former chief of staff at the District of Columbia Fire and Emergency Medical Services Department
- Lisa Rice, lobbyist and political strategist
- Tonya Kinlow, former Children's National Hospital executive
- Elissa Silverman, former at-large councilmember (2015–2023)
- Eboni-Rose Thompson, former president of the District of Columbia State Board of Education and Democratic candidate for Ward 7 councilmember in 2024
- Jacque Patterson, president of the District of Columbia State Board of Education
- Vincent Orange, former member of the Council of the District of Columbia from the at-large district (2011-2016) and from Ward 5 (1999-2007)
- Megan Browder, former deputy attorney general for the District of Columbia
- Zach Israel, former ANC commissioner from 4D04

== Candidates ==
=== Independents ===
- Doni Crawford, incumbent at-large councilmember (2026–present)
- Jacque Patterson, president of the District of Columbia State Board of Education
- Elissa Silverman, former at-large councilmember (2015–2023)

Withdrawn

- De’Andre Anderson

Disqualified

- Edward Daniels, ANC commissioner from 8F
- Senay Emmanuel, policy analyst
- Doug Sloan, political strategist and former vice president of the Washington, D.C. NAACP branch
- Khalil Lee, former congressional staffer

Declined

- Allister Chang, member of the District of Columbia State Board of Education from Ward 2
- Amy Mauro, former chief of staff at the District of Columbia Fire and Emergency Medical Services Department
- Lisa Rice, lobbyist and political strategist
- Eboni-Rose Thompson, member of the District of Columbia State Board of Education and Democratic candidate for Ward 7 councilmember in 2024

Endorsements

Doni Crawford

Local officials

- Phil Mendelson, council chairman (2012–present)
- Jacque Petterson, president of the District of Columbia State Board of Education and candidate in this race (cross-endorsement)

Organizations

- Greater Capital Area Association of REALTORS
- Restaurant Association of Metropolitan Washington
- DC Association of Realtors
Jacque Patterson

Local officials

- Doni Crawford, incumbent at-large councilmember and candidate in this race (cross-endorsement)
- Brandon Best, member of the District of Columbia State Board of Education from Ward 6
Elissa Silverman

Labor unions

- Amalgamated Transit Union Local 689
- American Federation of Government Employees Local 2725
- American Federation of State, County and Municipal Employees District Council 20
- International Association of Fire Fighters Local 36
- International Brotherhood of Electrical Workers Local 26
- Metropolitan Washington Council, AFL-CIO
- Service Employees International Union Local 32
- UNITE HERE Local 25
- Washington Teachers Union

Organizations

- Greater Greater Washington
- Sierra Club District of Columbia

== Debate ==
2026 Council of the District of Columbia at-large seat special election debate
No.	Date	Host	Moderator	Link	Independent	Independent	Independent
Key: P Participant A Absent N Not invited I Invited W Withdrawn							
Key: P Participant A Absent N Not invited I Invited W Withdrawn					Doni Crawford	Elissa Silverman	Jacque Patterson
1	Apr. 28, 2026	District of Columbia Board of Elections	Michael Brice-Saddler	YouTube	P	P	P

== Results ==
2026 Council of the District of Columbia special election results
Party	Candidate	Votes	%
Independent	Elissa Silverman	73,246	55.36
Independent	Doni Crawford (incumbent)	34,080	25.76
Independent	Jacque Patterson	23,487	17.75
Write-in		1,499	1.13
Total votes		132,312	100.00
n/a	Overvotes	666	
n/a	Undervotes	21,997	
