= Robert White (Washington, D.C., politician) =

American politician (born 1982)

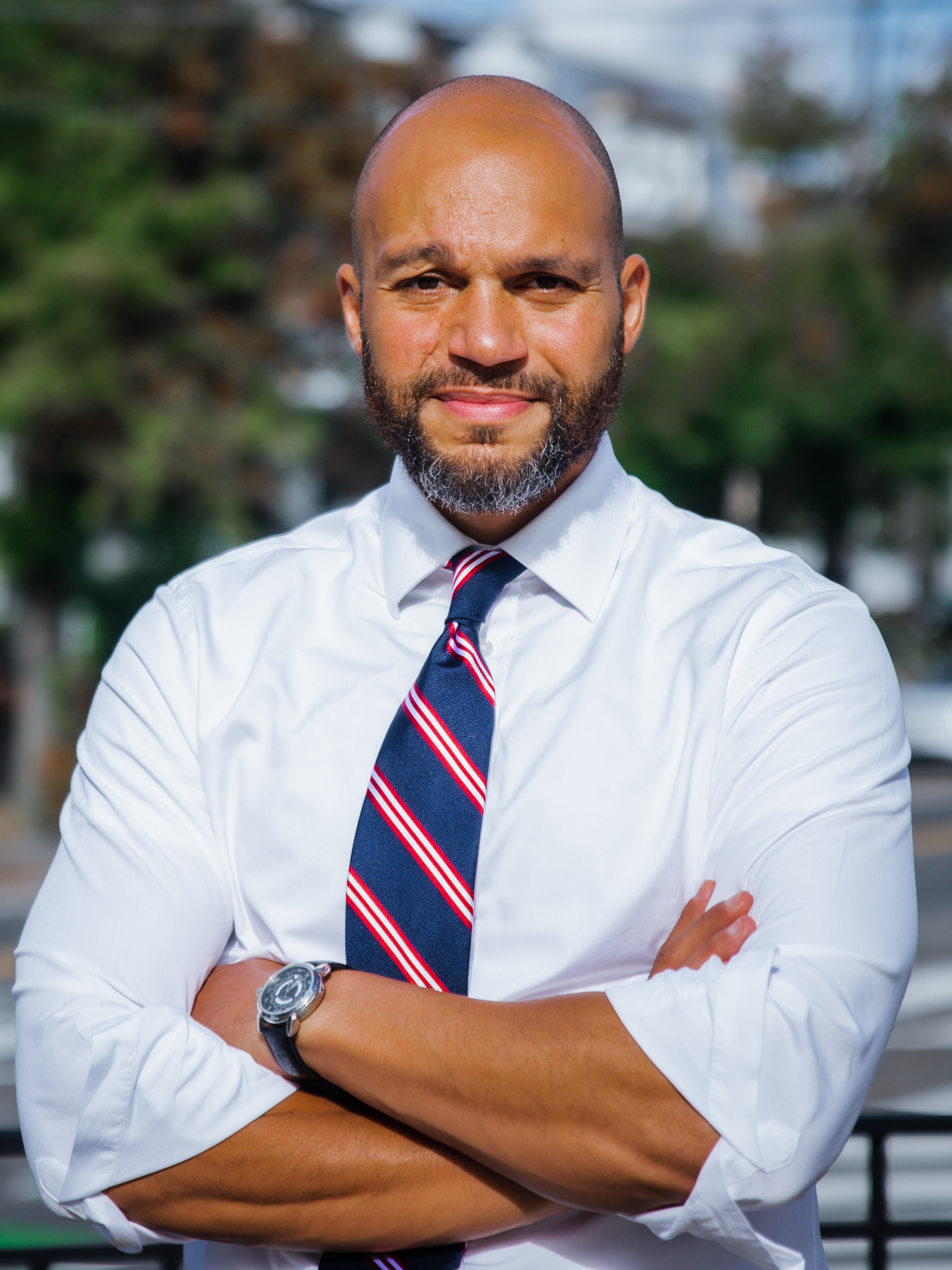
- Official portrait, 2021

Delegate-elect to the U.S. House of Representatives from the District of Columbia's at-large district
- Assuming office January 3, 2027
- Succeeding: Eleanor Holmes Norton

Member of the Council of the District of Columbia from the at-large district
- In office September 16, 2016 – November 2, 2026
- Preceded by: Vincent Orange
- Succeeded by: Jamal Holtz

Personal details
- Born: Robert Clyde White Jr. February 12, 1982 (age 44) Washington, D.C., U.S.
- Party: Democratic
- Spouse: Christy Richardson (m. 2012)
- Children: 2
- Education: St. Mary's College, Maryland (BA); American University (JD)

Robert Clyde White Jr. (born February 12, 1982) is an American attorney and delegate-elect for the District of Columbia's non-voting seat. A member of the Democratic Party, he has served on the Council of the District of Columbia since 2016.

From 2008 to 2013, he was legislative counsel in the office of Eleanor Holmes Norton, the District of Columbia's delegate to the United States House of Representatives. In 2014, he was an unsuccessful candidate for an at-large seat on the council, placing fourth out of 16. He won the Democratic primary for the at-large seat in 2016, defeating 12-year incumbent Vincent Orange. After Orange resigned his seat, White was appointed to Orange's complete term, and sworn in on September 16, 2016. He won election to his seat in November 2016 with 217,834 votes, which counted for 38% of the total votes. In October 2021, he announced his candidacy for mayor in the 2022 election. In June 2022, he finished second in the Democratic Primary, losing to incumbent Bowser.

White was the Democratic nominee in the 2026 election to be the District of Columbia's congressional delegate, the position Eleanor Holmes Norton held. He won the general election, defeating both the Republican and DC Statehood Green Party candidates.

== Early life and education ==
Robert White was born in Washington, D.C., in 1982 to Robert "Bobby" White Sr. and his wife, Tamara (née Richards). Robert is one of five children. His father is a fourth-generation Washingtonian, and a deacon in the Catholic Church. His parents divorced when he was young, and his mother died from breast cancer in September 1990 when he was eight years old. A month after her death, he was critically injured when a semi-trailer truck side-swiped a passenger vehicle in which he was riding on New Hampshire Avenue in Montgomery County, Maryland. The automobile spun, flipped over, struck the median, flipped into the air, and landed on the hood of another car in the opposite lane. He suffered a severe skull fracture, and underwent several operations before making a full recovery.

White attended the private Archbishop Carroll High School in Washington, D.C., where he began playing lacrosse his senior year. After graduation, he attended St. Mary's College of Maryland in St. Mary's City, Maryland. He graduated in 2004 with a bachelor's degree in political science and philosophy. He is the first member of his family to graduate from college.

White enrolled in law school at American University Washington College of Law in Washington, D.C. where he served on the Administrative Law Review and graduated with a Juris Doctor in 2007.

== Career ==
From 2007 to 2008, White was a law clerk for the Maryland District Court for Montgomery County, Maryland, and at the law firm of Webster, Fredrickson, Correia & Puth. In July 2008, White took a position as legislative counsel to Delegate Eleanor Holmes Norton. He specialized in economic development, environmental protection, and home rule legislation.

In January 2013, White was a co-founder of the Brightwood Park Citizens Association, and was elected its founding president.

=== 2014 Council candidacy ===
White resigned from Norton's office in September 2013, switched his political affiliation to independent, and he filed as a candidate for an at-large seat on the Council of the District of Columbia, seeking to defeat one of the two incumbents (David Catania and Anita Bonds). As the primary season neared its conclusion in April 2014, White reported raising $34,000 in donations. In comparison, Bonds had raised $59,000, and realtor and banker John F. Settles II had raised $28,000. The general election field was a crowded one. After the primary, Catania announced he would run for Mayor of the District of Columbia as an independent. Instead of one open at-large seat, voters now needed to fill two slots. A number of candidates registered as independents to run for the at-large seat, (Note: The charter of the District of Columbia reserves three of the council's five at-large seats for individuals who are not affiliated with the political party holding a majority on the council. In 2014, Catania's seat was the only one of these three seats that was up for election. A candidate who wanted to be eligible to win this particular at-large seat could not be affiliated with the Democratic Party.) while others saw their chances for winning a seat increase.

White's fundraising efforts dried up as donors began sending money to other candidates. White raised another $35,000 by mid-August, During the election campaign, White advocated banning all corporate and private political donations and using public financing for all campaigns for D.C. government office.

White's candidacy was endorsed by at-large Council member David Grosso, Ward 7 Council member Yvette Alexander, and Ward 5 Council member Kenyan McDuffie. White was also backed by the AFSCME District Council 20, two locals of the Service Employees International Union, the D.C. Association of Realtors, the D.C. Hotel Association, and the Sierra Club. The endorsements helped, as White raised $70,000 from mid-August to mid-October, more than any other candidate. On October 27, the editorial board of The Washington Post endorsed him as well.

On election day, however, voters chose Anita Bonds and Elissa Silverman to represent them in the at-large seats on the council. White came in a distant fourth, with just 6.2 percent of the vote. White later said his all-volunteer campaign staff lacked the time and expertise to run the get out the vote effort he needed.

=== 2016 Council candidacy ===
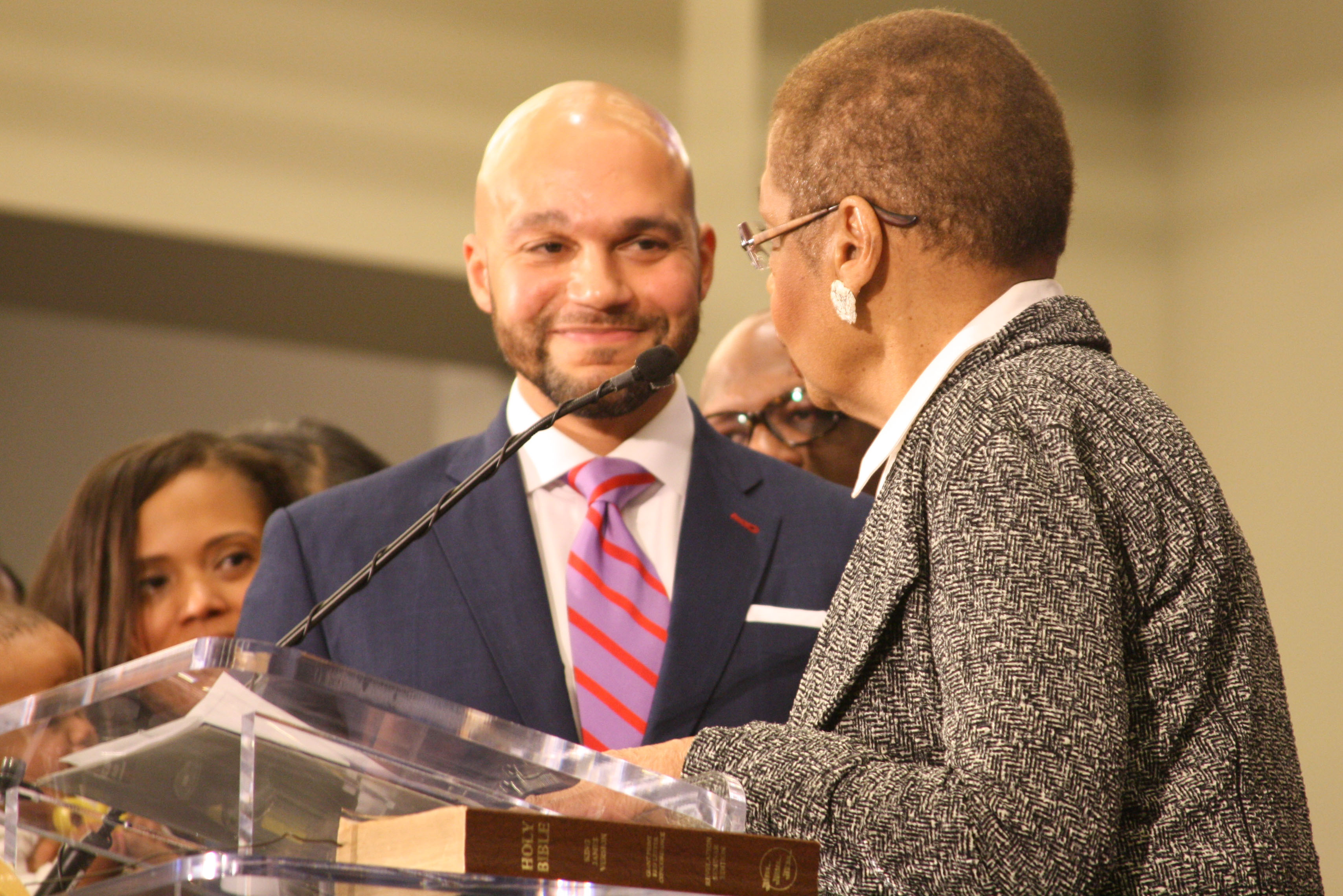
White being sworn into the D.C. Council, 2017

==== Primary election ====
In February 2015, Karl Racine, the newly elected Attorney General of the District of Columbia, hired White as the first Director of the Office of Community Outreach. The job paid $95,000 a year.

In October 2015, White supporters formed a committee to explore another run at an at-large seat on the council, challenging incumbent Vincent Orange. White hired the campaign consulting firm Apollo Political, led by Sean Rankin, to run his campaign. But in late November, the District of Columbia Board of Ethics and Government Accountability, the agency charged with overseeing enforcement of ethics regulations for the city's government employees, issued a ruling in which it said that the White exploratory committee could not fundraise so long as White remained a city employee. The exploratory committee shut down, after having raised roughly $15,000.

Although Orange had secured most of the major endorsements in the race, White was able to win those endorsements Orange could not. In mid-April, White received 96 percent of the endorsement votes from members of the progressive group D.C. For Democracy. In May, Ward 3 Council member Mary Cheh endorsed White, and helped him fundraise. The editorial board of The Washington Post endorsed Orange's candidacy, praising him for his legislative skills and focus on economic development. White also won endorsements from several tenants' rights groups, an LGBT activists' group, a Latino political group, several other progressive political organizations, and Ward 8 city council candidate Trayon White. White's endorsement was particularly important, as he was running for office in Ward 8 east of the Anacostia River—areas where voters usually supported Orange overwhelmingly.

During the last three months of the primary campaign, White raised more than $96,000, surpassing the $61,000 raised by Vincent Orange. By the time of the June 10 election finance report, White had raised a total of $187,000, and had $26,000 for the final week of the campaign. Orange, however, had raised a primary season total of $282,000, and had $49,000 on hand. Most of White's campaign funds were spent paying canvassers to visit homes and purchase a large number of yard signs, both of which were intended to raise his profile citywide.

During the campaign, White emphasized the two ethics fines Orange had incurred in the past four years, condemned Orange for raising donations from corporations with business coming before his council committee, and attacked Orange for being "too cozy" with city contractors. He also attacked Orange's ideas for economic development as kooky and ineffective, and called his tenure as the council's workforce development overseer lackluster. White also criticized David Garber, widely considered Orange's top challenger, for ignoring African American and poor neighborhoods. White said that if he were elected, he would improve oversight of the District of Columbia Department of Transportation and the District of Columbia Department of Consumer and Regulatory Affairs, improve access to affordable housing, focus on zoning laws to bring redevelopment to dying retail corridors, and support legislation to force employers to provide 12 weeks of paid sick leave.

On June 14, 2016, Robert White defeated Vincent Orange and David Garber to win the Democratic Party nomination for the at-large seat on the city council. His margin of victory was 2 percentage points. The Washington Post said unnamed political observers attributed White's win to White's persistent attacks on Orange's ethics, his use of a paid staff, and an anti-incumbent feeling among voters. The newspaper also noted that White had worked hard to keep other candidates out of the race, allowing the anti-Orange vote to coalesce behind a single candidate.

==== Interim council appointment ====
On July 28, 2016, the D.C. Chamber of Commerce announced that it had selected Vincent Orange to be the organization's next president. Orange's colleagues on the council claimed this created a strong conflict of interest, and Orange resigned from the council effective August 15, 2016 (the same day on which his Chamber of Commerce position began).

On September 15, 2016, D.C. Democratic State Committee officials voted 43-to-2 to appoint Robert White to Orange's at-large city council seat. He was sworn in the following day.

==== General election ====
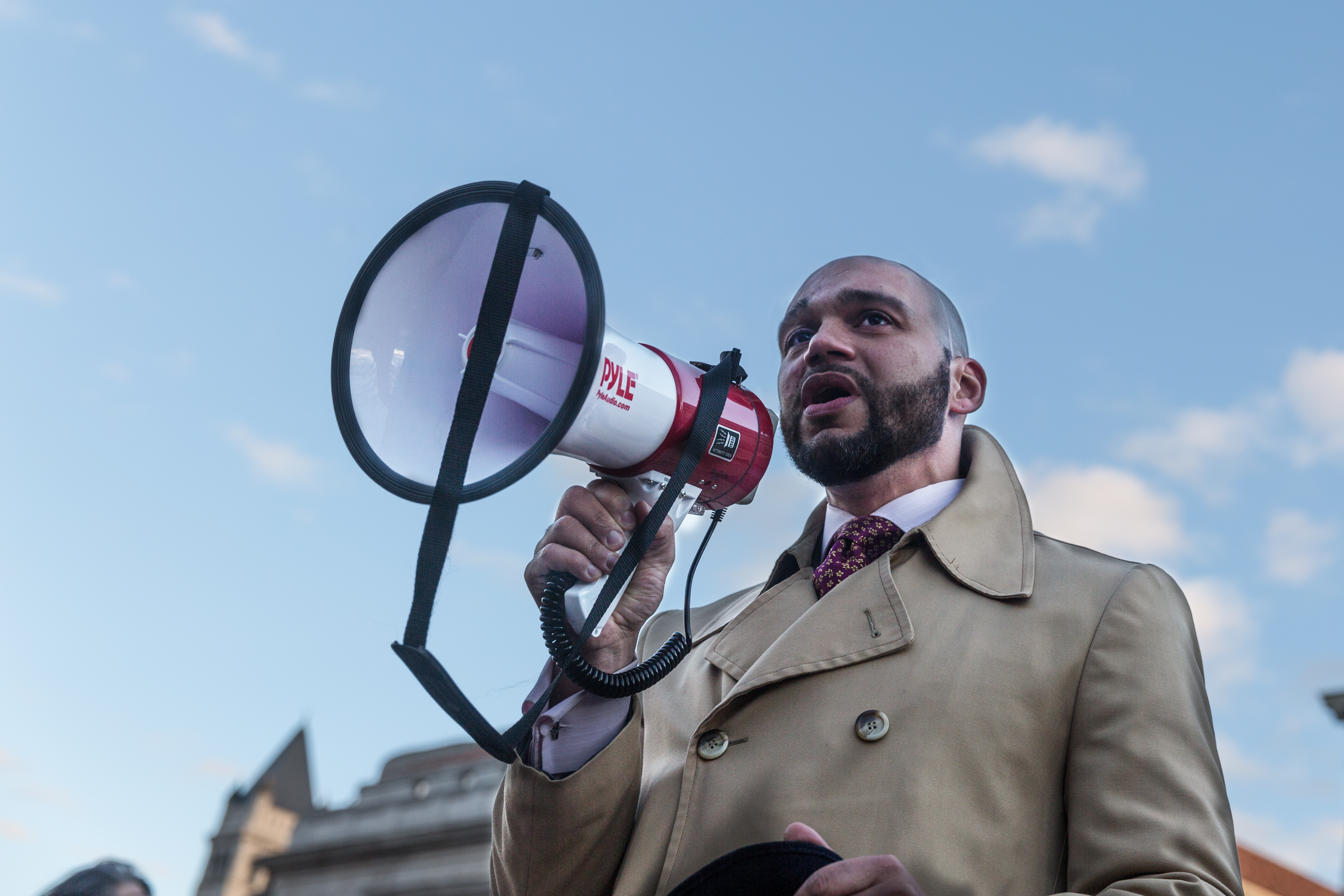
White speaking at a protest against President Donald Trump's proposed immigration bans in January 2017

In June 2016, White endorsed a D.C. campaign finance reform proposal to prohibit any person or corporation from receiving a city contract worth $100,000 or more if they donate to a city council election. The proposal was one of the strictest of several proposals to address corruption and ethics issues facing the council, several of whose members had been found guilty of ethics and fraud charges in the past several years.

On November 8, 2016, White easily won election to the seat to which he had been temporarily appointed. He received 37.9 percent of all votes cast. Incumbent At-large Councilmember David Grosso also retained his seat, coming in second with 17.84 percent of the vote. Challengers G. Lee Aikin (4.82 percent), Carolina Celnik (4.62 percent), and John C. Cheeks (4.12 percent) rounded out the top vote-getters.

=== Council term ===
White was sworn into office for a full four-year council term at noon on January 2, 2017. In his time on the council, he has successfully passed numerous pieces of legislation, including: the Birth to Three for All DC Act (expanded early childhood education), The Returning Citizens Opportunity to Succeed Amendment Act, the Bias in Threat Assessments Evaluation Amendment Act, the Youth Rights Amendment Act, the Housing Rehabilitation Incentives Regulation Amendment Act, the Shared Services to Improve Housing Counseling Act, the Generating Affordability in Neighborhoods (GAIN) Act, the Human Rights Enhancement Amendment Act, the Reporting Sexual Misconduct in Schools Amendment Act, the Financial Literacy Education in Schools Amendment Act, the Economic Development Return on Investment Affordability Amendment Act, the Sexual Harassment Data Collection and Reporting Act, the Fund Management Diversification Amendment Act, the Local Work Opportunity Tax Credit Amendment Act, the Returning Citizens Cannabis Equity Amendment Act, the District Government Transgender and Non-Binary Employment Study Act, the Restore the Vote Amendment Act, the Renewable Energy Future Amendment Act, the Senior Co-Living Program Establishment Act, and more.

In 2019, White was a deciding vote approving the no-bid, single source award of a $215 million, five-year contract to start the District's sports betting operations. White initially opposed the deal, expressing reservations about a sole source contract. His position changed after his committee was offered oversight of the transit agency. White claimed that he changed his mind because of benefits the no bid contract would bring to local businesses.

As chair of the Committee on Facilities and Procurement, White accepted at $2,000 donation for his 2020 re-election campaign from the head of Security Assurance Management, a company that contracted security officers to the DC Government. In a whistleblower lawsuit, Security Assurance Management was charged with providing staff that worked under expired licenses, fell asleep on the job, and failed to detect test bombs. White said he could not tell who was telling the truth and claimed he would pursue oversight of company. Before White took office, he said all corporate contributions should be banned.

=== 2022 mayoral campaign ===
White announced his candidacy for Mayor in the 2022 election in October 2021. He was endorsed by DC Attorney General Karl Racine, the DC Nurses Association, the Washington Teachers Union, AFSCME DC Council 20, AFGE Local 1975, the DC Latino Caucus, Sierra Club DC, DC Working Families Party, Jews United For Justice Campaign Fund, DC For Democracy, DC NOW, Our Revolution DC, Capital Stonewall Democrats, NASW Metro DC, and Petworth News. He is also a Moms Demand Action Gun Sense Candidate. White lost in the Democratic primary to sitting Mayor Muriel Bowser, coalescing support from progressives but losing all wards except for Ward 1.

=== 2026 congressional campaign ===
In September 2025, White announced that he would run in the 2026 election to be Washington, D.C.'s congressional delegate, the seat Norton has held since 1991. His candidacy came as Norton increasingly faced questions about her advanced age (88 as of White's announcement) and her capacity to continue serving, and calls for her to retire. POLITICO called White's candidacy the incumbent's "most serious political challenge in 35 years."

As of White's announcement, Norton was planning to run again in 2026. However, she announced her retirement soon after.

More than half a dozen candidates ran for the seat in the primary.

White won the Democratic primary in June 2026, getting 63 percent of the vote. Fellow Council member Brooke Pinto, his closest competitor, got 22 percent. Since D.C.'s electorate is extremely Democratic, White won the general election easily. In order to comply with a 1970 law that forbids the delegate to hold any other public office on the day of election, White resigned his Council seat on November 2, 2026, one day before Election Day.

== Personal life ==
White met his wife Christy Richardson in law school. She is a lawyer for the Securities and Exchange Commission. They married in October 2012. The couple's first child, daughter Madison, was born in July 2016;and their second daughter Monroe in March 2019. Their family is Catholic.

White has lived in Southwest DC, Brightwood Park, and Shepherd Park.

== Electoral history ==
=== 2014 ===
2014 General Election, Council of the District of Columbia, At-Large Seats
| Party | Candidate | Votes | % |
|---|---|---|---|
| Democratic | Anita Bonds | 85,575 | 24 |
| Independent | Elissa Silverman | 41,300 | 12 |
| Independent | Michael D. Brown | 28,614 | 8 |
| Independent | Robert White | 22,198 | 6 |
| Independent | Courtney R. Snowden | 19,551 | 5 |
| DC Statehood Green | Eugene Puryear | 12,525 | 4 |
| Independent | Graylan Scott Hagler | 10,539 | 3 |
| Independent | Khalid Pitts | 10,392 | 3 |
| Republican | Marc Morgan | 9,947 | 3 |
| Independent | Brian Hart | 8,933 | 3 |
| Independent | Kishan Putta | 6,135 | 2 |
| Independent | Calvin Gurley | 4,553 | 1 |
| Independent | Eric J. Jones | 4,405 | 1 |
| Libertarian | Frederick Steiner | 3,766 | 1 |
| Independent | Wendell Felder | 2,964 | 1 |
| | write-in | 1,472 | 0 |

=== 2016 ===
2016 Council of the District of Columbia, At Large, Democratic Party primary election
| Party | Candidate | Votes | % |
|---|---|---|---|
| Democratic | Robert White | 38,805 | 40 |
| Democratic | Vincent Orange | 37,009 | 38 |
| Democratic | David Garber | 14,237 | 14 |
| Democratic | write-in | 787 | 1 |

2016 Council of the District of Columbia, At Large, General Election
| Party | Candidate | Votes | % |
|---|---|---|---|
| Democratic | Robert White | 217,834 | 38 |
| Independent | David Grosso | 102,544 | 18 |
| DC Statehood Green | G. Lee Aikin | 27,685 | 5 |
| Republican | Carolina Celnik | 26,530 | 5 |
| Independent | John C. Cheeks | 23,698 | 4 |
| Libertarian | Matthew Klokel | 13,460 | 2 |
| | Write-in | 3,331 | 1 |

2026 United States House of Representatives election in the District of Columbia, Democratic primary
| Party | Candidate | Votes | % |
|---|---|---|---|
| Democratic | Robert White | 86,871 | 63.61 |
| Democratic | Brooke Pinto | 28,550 | 20.90 |
| Democratic | Kinney Zalesne | 10,666 | 7.81 |
| Democratic | Trent Holbrook | 6,100 | 4.47 |
| Democratic | Greg Jaczko | 3,936 | 2.88 |
| Write-in | | 455 | 0.33 |
| Total votes | | 136,578 | 100.00 |
| n/a | Overvotes | 539 | |
| n/a | Undervotes | 4,961 | |

== Notes ==
U.S. House of Representatives
| Preceded by Eleanor Holmes Norton | Delegate to the U.S. House of Representatives from the District of Columbia's at-large congressional district Taking office 2027 | Elect |
