= The 51st =

Local newsroom in D.C.

- Information with representation
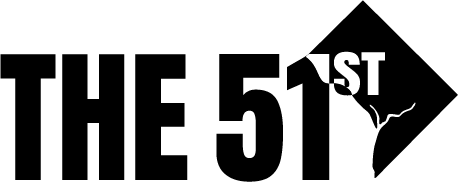
- Type: Website and newsletter
- Founder(s): Natalie Delgadillo, Eric Falquero, Teresa Frontado, Colleen Grablick, Abigail Higgins, Maddie Poore
- Board of Directors: Christina Sturdivant Sani, Natalie Delgadillo, Eric Falquero, Colleen Grablick, Abigail Higgins, Maddie Poore
- Founded: 2024
- Language: Predominantly English, some Spanish and Amharic with partners
- City: District of Columbia
- Country: United States
- Website: 51st.news

The 51st is a nonprofit local news website registered in the District of Columbia. It is affiliated with the Tiny News Collective and Institute for Nonprofit News. The name is a reference to the District of Columbia statehood movement debate. In addition to publishing, the organization gathers people in person by tabling at community events and hosting their own, such as a live gameshow celebrating D.C. history and culture.

== History ==
The company was founded in May 2024 by a group of former DCist and WAMU employees. The effort was preceded by layoffs at WAMU, including shuttering of the DCist local news website. (Note: Local news coverage in D.C., and across U.S. communities, has shrunk since the early 2000s. The cutbacks that sparked The 51st were simply the most recent in the District.) The founders crowdfunded a quarter of a million dollars to get started. The outlet began publishing weekly newsletters that October.

== Operations ==
The organization is one of a growing number of worker-owned (for-profit) and worker-led (non-profit) media cooperatives. Such models position themselves as alternatives to mainstream media. Other examples include The Appeal, 404 Media and Hell Gate NYC.

== Coverage ==
In its first year, The 51st contributed to a Pulitzer Prize-winning investigation. Several of its articles and sections were also recognized with awards from the D.C. chapter of the Society of Professional Journalists.

The newsroom collaborates with other local outlets frequently, including Street Sense, the Baltimore Banner, Ethiopique, El Tiempo Latino, and The Washington Afro-American.
