= Stand Up! for Democracy in DC Coalition =

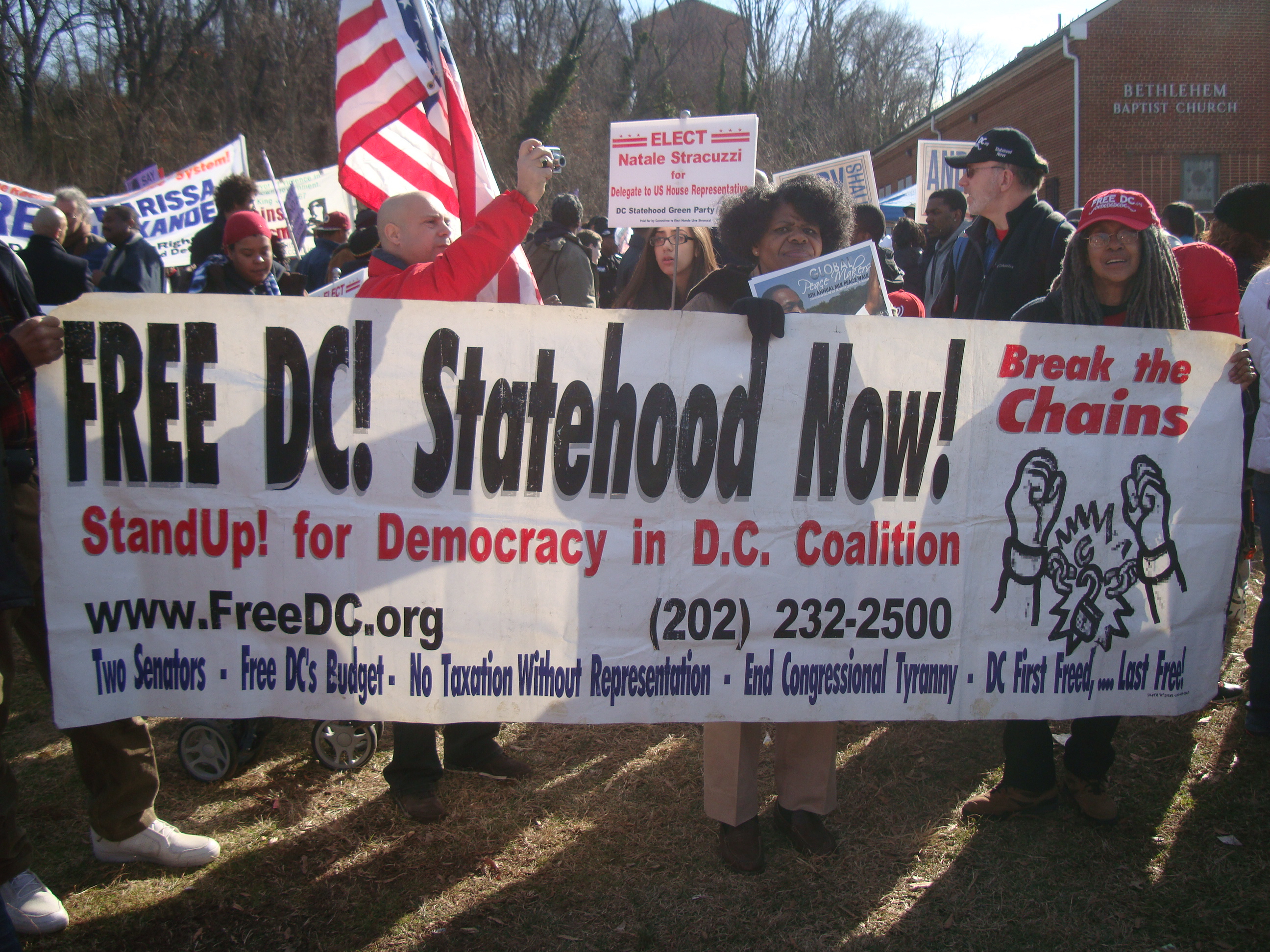
Anise Jenkins in signature red hat at MLK Day Parade, January 2013

Stand Up! for Democracy in D.C. Coalition, commonly referred to as simply Stand Up! or Free DC, is a grassroots, nonpartisan citizens advocacy group and 501(c)(3) nonprofit organization. Founded in 1997, the aim of Free DC is to achieve total statehood for the District of Columbia, defined by the group as recognition of the District of Columbia's long-standing petition for statehood, complete control of the local budget, with no review or veto by Congress of the District's budget or local laws, its own locally elected or appointed judges, and full voting representation in the United States House and Senate.

== History ==
Although the District of Columbia Home Rule Act was enacted in 1973, establishing that the city could elect its own local government, citizens continue to lack full voting rights. The district does not have the right to elect representatives to Congress despite its population being larger than that of states such as Wyoming or Vermont. Policies passed by the city are subject to review by Congress. This is argued to be a violation of the 1990 Copenhagen Declaration, which states that “every citizen should have the right and opportunity to vote and be elected to genuine periodic elections, which shall be by universal and equal suffrage.” The United States is a signatory.

Anise Jenkins, the Executive Director of Stand Up! for Democracy in D.C. (Free D.C.), became active in the fight for D.C. statehood in the late 1990s following the creation of the District of Columbia Financial Control Board. The officials on the D.C. Control Board were appointed by the President of the United States and had the power to override decisions by locally elected officials on issues regarding taxation and spending. This led Jenkins and others to organize with ministers, local activists and students at Howard University and the University of the District of Columbia. The group met in the basement of the Rainbow/PUSH coalition and later at the National Council of Negro Women where they were supported by Dorothy Height.

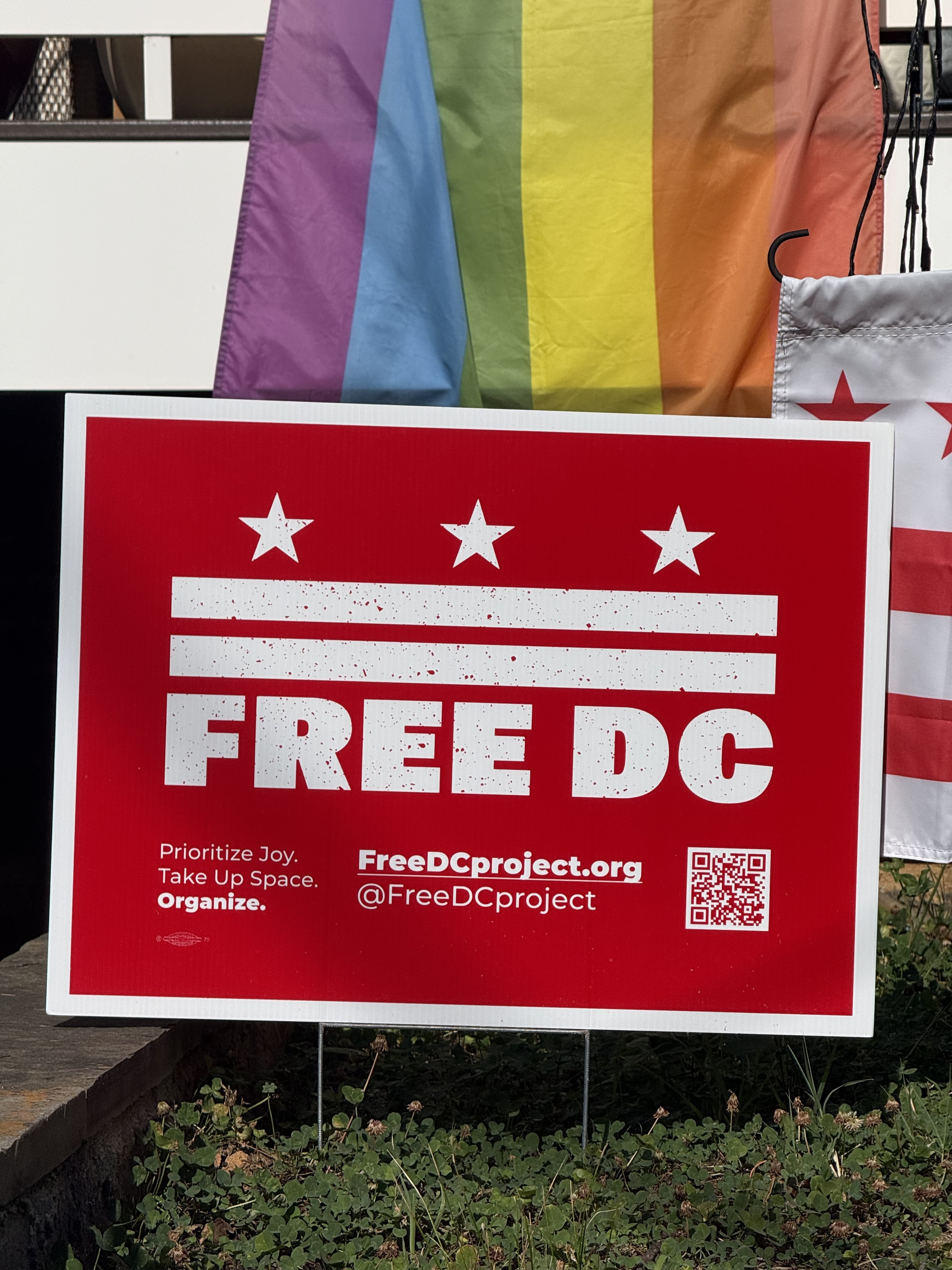
A Free DC yard sign in 2026. Many residents placed these signs in their front yards in response to the Trump administration increasing its interventions in the District.

On August 11, 2025 President Trump announced that he would federalize the Metropolitan Police Department of the District of Columbia and send National Guard troops to the city. These events have led to increased interest in and activity by Free DC, including protests and trainings. As of 2025, the organization is guided by a seven-member advisory council and a three-person leadership team.

== See also ==
- Anise Jenkins
- Woman's National Democratic Club
- D.C. Statehood Green Party
- District of Columbia voting rights
- District of Columbia statehood movement
- District of Columbia voting rights
