= United Nations Association of the National Capital Area =

Logo of the United Nations Organization

The United Nations Association of the National Capital Area (UNA-NCA) is a non-profit membership organization based in Washington, DC. It was created with the intent of building an understanding and support for the ideas and work of the United Nations among the American people. It works to educate, encourage, and mobilize Americans to support the principles of the United Nations. It also works to strengthen the United Nations system, promotes constructive United States leadership in that system, and promotes the objectives of the United Nations Charter.

== History ==
The United Nations Association of the National Capital Area (UNA-NCA) was established in 1952. It is one of the oldest and largest divisions of the United Nations Association of the USA (UNA-USA). It is also a member of the World Federation of United Nations Associations (WFUNA). Over 2,000 members, volunteers, and supporters contribute to the organization. The UNA-NCA works to build public knowledge, strengthen UN-US relations, and aid the UN in achieving its goals.
