= 2022 Washington, D.C., mayoral election =

- November 8, 2022
- Turnout: 40.76 ▼5.53 pp
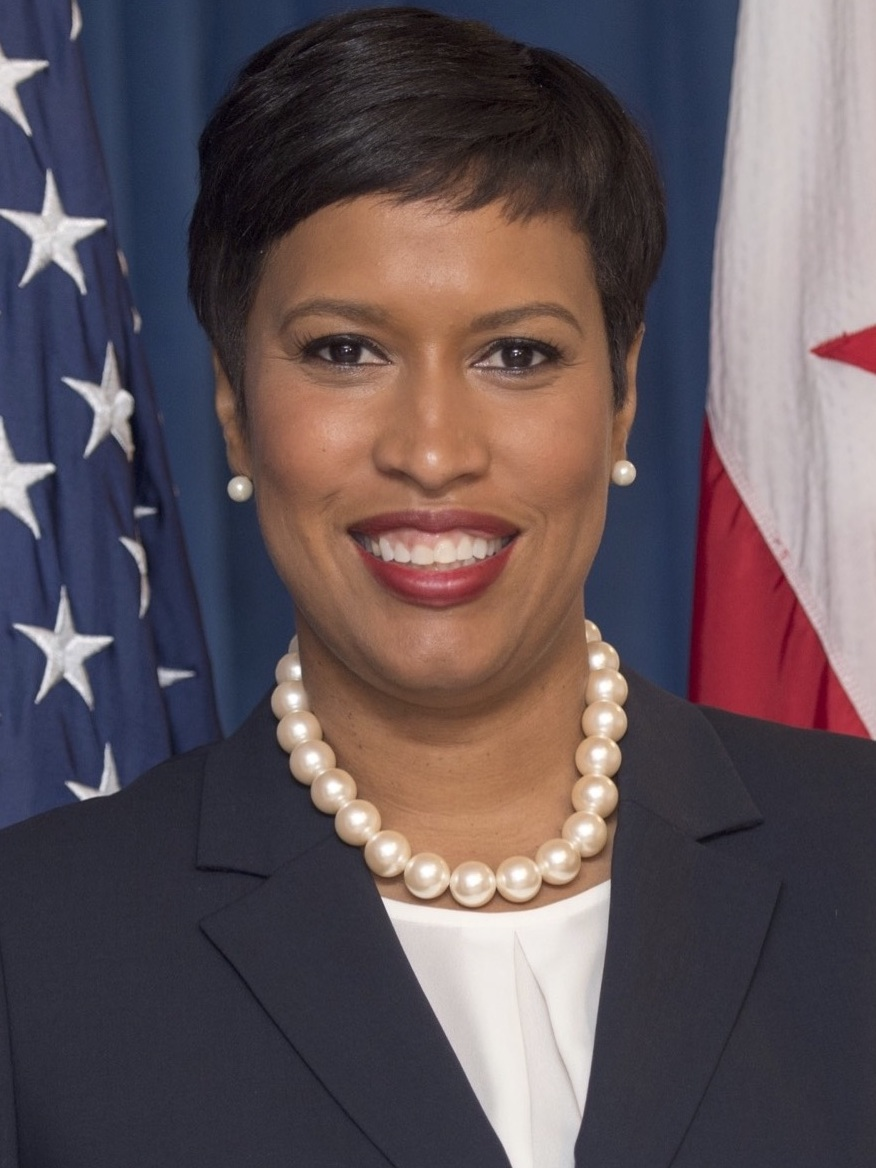

| Nominee | Muriel Bowser | Rodney "Red" Grant | Stacia Hall |
| Party | Democratic | Independent | Republican |
| Popular vote | 147,433 | 29,531 | 11,510 |
| Percentage | 74.62% | 14.95% | 5.83% |
- Bowser: 50–60% 60–70% 70–80% 80–90%
Mayor before election
Muriel Bowser
Democratic
Elected Mayor
Muriel Bowser
Democratic

On November 8, 2022, Washington, D.C. held an election for its mayor. Incumbent Democrat Muriel Bowser was elected to a third term in a landslide. The Republican nominee, Stacia Hall, received 2,368 votes in the primary, and independent candidate Rodney "Red" Grant garnered 4,700 signatures to gain ballot access. Both appeared on the general election ballot, along with Libertarian Party candidate Dennis Sobin. D.C. Statehood Green Party nominee Corren Brown did not appear on the general election ballot.

== Democratic primary ==
Incumbent Attorney General Karl Racine was considered to be the most likely Democrat to challenge Muriel Bowser. Though Racine filed to seek reelection as attorney general, in October 2021 he announced he would not be running for any office in 2022. The following day, Councilmember Robert White, a former aide to Racine, announced his campaign. White was joined by several other candidates later, the most notable of whom was Councilmember Trayon White, who announced his campaign in a comment on Instagram. On April 4, 2022, Robert White's campaign announced a challenge to Trayon White's ballot access signatures. Robert White's camp argued that up to 2,800 of Trayon White's signatures might be invalid. While many of Trayon White's signatures were invalidated by the Board of Elections, they certified 2,138 signatures, just 138 over the minimum required, ensuring that Trayon White would appear on the ballot.

=== Candidates ===
==== Declared ====
- Muriel Bowser, incumbent (2015–present)

==== Eliminated in primary ====
- James Butler, Advisory Neighborhood Commissioner in Ward 5 and candidate for mayor in 2018
- Robert White, at-large council member (2016–present)
- Trayon White, Ward 8 council member (2017–present)

==== Failed to qualify for ballot access ====
- Michael Campbell, pastor and chapter president of DC National Action Network
- Andre Delontae Davis, teacher

==== Declined ====
- Karl Racine, attorney general for the District of Columbia (2015–present)

=== Endorsements ===
Muriel Bowser

Local officials

- Angela Alsobrooks, Prince George's County executive (2018–2025)

Labor unions

- Metro Washington Labor Council AFL-CIO
- SEIU 32BJ
- UNITE HERE Local 23
- UNITE HERE Local 25

Organizations

- Democrats for Education Reform D.C.
- District of Columbia Association of Realtors
- EMILY's List

Newspapers

- The Washington Post
Robert White

Individuals

- Karl Racine, attorney general for the District of Columbia (2015–2023)

Labor unions

- AFGE Local 1975
- AFSCME District 20
- Washington Teachers' Union

Organizations

- Capital Stonewall Democrats
- DC Now
- Our Revolution DC
- Sierra Club
- Working Families Party

Newspapers

- The GW Hatchet (Democratic primary only)

=== Debate ===
2022 D.C. mayor debate
| No. | Date | Host | Moderator | Link | Democratic | Democratic | Democratic |
| Key: P Participant A Absent N Not invited I Invited W Withdrawn | | | | | | | |
| Key: P Participant A Absent N Not invited I Invited W Withdrawn | | | | | Muriel Bowser | Trayon White | Robert White Jr. |
|---|---|---|---|---|---|---|---|
| 1 | Jun. 1, 2022 | Georgetown University; Institute of Politics; WTTG | Mo Elleithee; Tom Fitzgerald; Jeannette Reyes | | P | P | P |

=== Polling ===
Graphical summary

| Poll source | Date(s) administered | Sample size (Note: Key: A – all adults RV – registered voters LV – likely voters V – unclear) | Margin of error | Muriel Bowser | Robert White | Trayon White | Other | Undecided |
|---|---|---|---|---|---|---|---|---|
| Lake Research Partners (D) (Note: This poll was sponsored by Robert White's campaign.) | June 7–9, 2022 | 500 (LV) | ± 4.4% | 41% | 37% | 6% | 1% | 16% |
| Lake Research Partners (D) | March 2022 | 750 (LV) | ± 3.6% | 47% | 24% | 5% | 4% | 20% |
| Washington Post | February 2–14, 2022 | 579 (RV) | ± 5.0% | 47% | 19% | 17% | 4% (Note: None of them (volunteered response) with 4%) | 11% |

Hypothetical polling

| Poll source | Date(s) administered | Sample size | Margin of error | Muriel Bowser | Robert White | Other | Undecided |
|---|---|---|---|---|---|---|---|
| Lake Research Partners (D) | June 7–9, 2022 | 500 (LV) | ± 4.4% | 42% | 40% | 3% | 16% |
| Lake Research Partners (D) | March 2022 | 750 (LV) | ± 3.6% | 48% | 26% | 4% | 21% |

=== Results ===

Bowser

30–40%
40–50%
50–60%
60–70%

R. White

50–60%

Bowser

30–40%
40–50%
50–60%
60–70%
70–80%
80–90%

R. White

30–40%
40–50%
50–60%
60–70%

T. White

30–40%
40–50%

Other

40-50% tie
No votes

Democratic primary results
| Party | Candidate | Votes | % |
|---|---|---|---|
| Democratic | Muriel Bowser (incumbent) | 62,391 | 49.01 |
| Democratic | Robert White | 51,557 | 40.50 |
| Democratic | Trayon White | 11,193 | 8.79 |
| Democratic | James Butler | 1,753 | 1.38 |
| Write-in | | 406 | 0.32 |
| Total votes | | 127,300 | 100 |
| n/a | Overvotes | 219 | |
| n/a | Undervotes | 812 | |

== Republican primary ==
=== Candidates ===
==== Declared ====
- Stacia Hall

==== Results ====
Results by ward Hall: Hall—50–60%; Hall—70-80%; Hall—80-90%

Republican primary results
| Party | Candidate | Votes | % |
|---|---|---|---|
| Republican | Stacia Hall | 2,368 | 80.41 |
| Write-in | | 577 | 19.59 |
| Total votes | | 2,945 | 100 |
| n/a | Overvotes | 11 | |
| n/a | Undervotes | 225 | |

== Statehood Green primary ==
=== Candidates ===
==== Declared ====
- Corren Brown

== Independents ==
=== Candidates ===
==== Qualified for ballot access ====
- Rodney "Red" Grant, entertainment executive, philanthropist, and humanitarian

==== Declined ====
- David Grosso, at-large councilor (2013–2021)
- Karl Racine, attorney general for the District of Columbia (since 2015)

== General election ==
=== Results ===
2022 Washington, D.C., mayoral election
| Party | Candidate | Votes | % | ±% |
|---|---|---|---|---|
| Democratic | Muriel Bowser (incumbent) | 147,433 | 74.62 | −1.78 |
| Independent | Rodney Grant | 29,531 | 14.95 | N/A |
| Republican | Stacia Hall | 11,510 | 5.83 | N/A |
| Libertarian | Dennis Sobin | 2,521 | 1.28 | −2.12 |
| Write-in | | 6,580 | 3.33 | -0.67 |
| Total votes | | 197,575 | 100 | |
| Turnout | | 205,774 | 40.76 | −5.53 |
| Registered electors | | 504,815 | | |

=== Results by ward ===
| Ward | Muriel Bowser Democratic | | Stacia Hall Republican | | Various candidates Other parties | |
| Ward | # | % | # | % | # | % |
|---|---|---|---|---|---|---|
| Ward 1 | 19,156 | 77.37% | 1,002 | 4.05% | 4,601 | 18.57% |
| Ward 2 | 15,295 | 77.66% | 1,737 | 8.82% | 2,663 | 13.52% |
| Ward 3 | 23,562 | 79.01% | 2,563 | 8.59% | 3,695 | 12.39% |
| Ward 4 | 21,461 | 77.5% | 1,010 | 3.65% | 5,222 | 18.83% |
| Ward 5 | 19,558 | 73.01% | 1,070 | 3.99% | 6,173 | 23.01% |
| Ward 6 | 27,831 | 73.93% | 3,203 | 8.51% | 6,609 | 17.55% |
| Ward 7 | 12,166 | 67.11% | 554 | 3.06% | 5,408 | 29.83% |
| Ward 8 | 8,374 | 64.39% | 371 | 2.85% | 4,261 | 32.76% |
| Total | 147,433 | 74.62% | 11,510 | 5.83% | 38,632 | 19.56% |

== Notes ==
Partisan clients

== See also ==
- 2022 Council of the District of Columbia election
