= Hawthorn House =

Hawthorn House may refer to:

- Hawthorn House, Menai Bridge
- Hawthorn House (Mobile, Alabama)
- Hawthorne House (Pine Apple, Alabama), listed on the National Register of Historic Places as Hawthorn House (misspelled)
- Hawthorn Hill, Oakwood, Ohio
- Hawthorn Hall, Wlimslow, Cheshire, England

== See also ==
- Hawthorne House (disambiguation)
