= 2022 Council of the District of Columbia election =

US Election

- November 8, 2022

7 of the 13 seats in the Council of the District of Columbia 7 seats needed for a majority
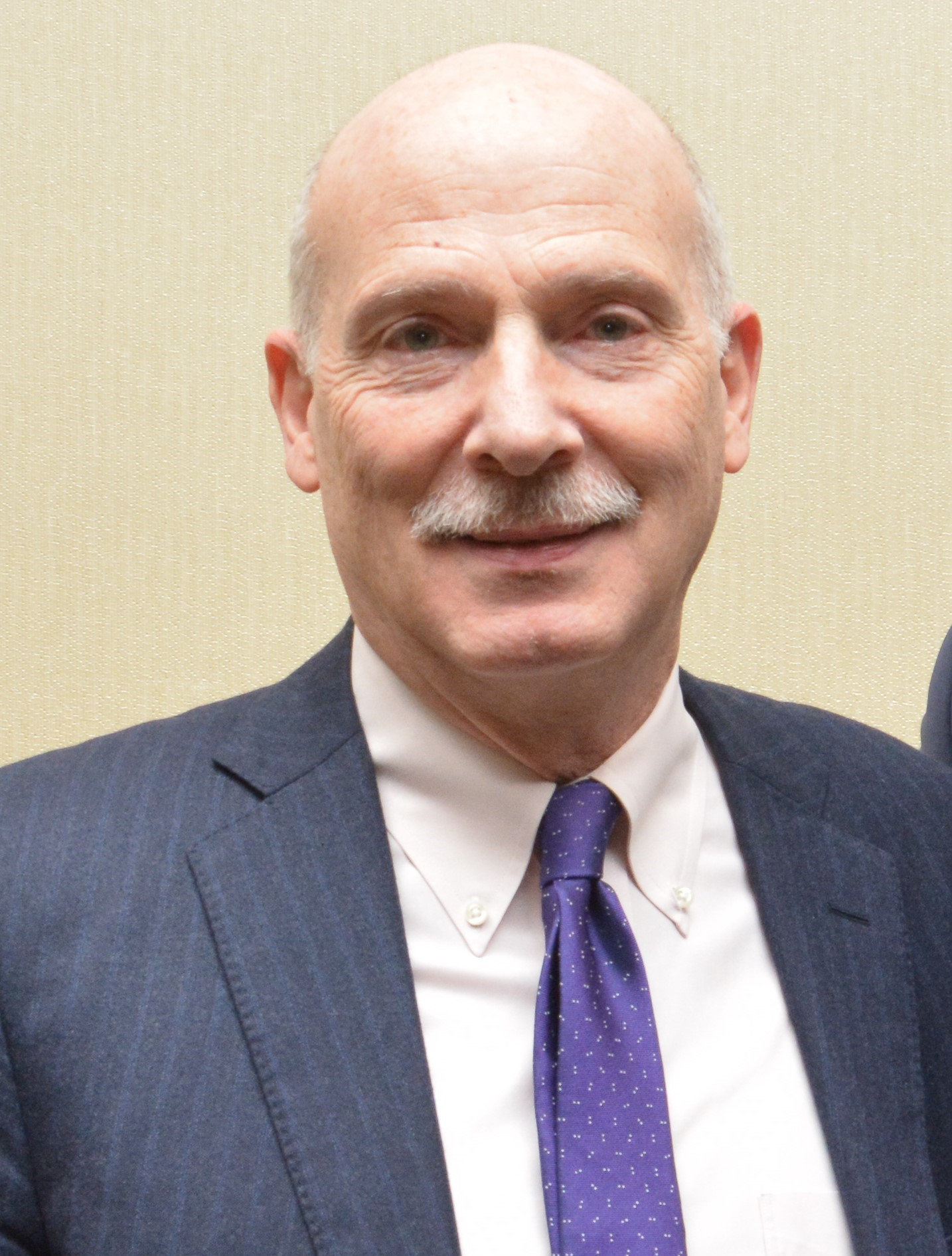

	Majority party	Minority party
Leader	Phil Mendelson
Party	Democratic	Independent
Seats before	11	2
Seats after	11	2
Seat change	Steady	Steady

On November 8, 2022, a general election was held for the Council of the District of Columbia. Elections were held in four wards as well as for chairperson of the council and two at-large seats. Democrats remained in control of the council, electing six out of the seven positions that were on the ballot. Kenyan McDuffie, formerly the Democratic councilperson for Ward 5, was elected to an at-large seat as an independent.

== Background ==
The council is composed of thirteen members, each elected by district residents to a four-year term. One member is elected from each of the district's eight wards. Four at-large members represent the district as a whole. The chairman of the council is likewise elected at an at-large basis. The terms of the at-large members are staggered so that two are elected every two years, and each D.C. resident may vote for two different at-large candidates in each general election.

According to the Home Rule Act, of the chair and the at-large members, a maximum of three may be affiliated with the majority political party. In the council's electoral history, of the elected members who were not affiliated with the majority party, most were elected as at-large members. In 2008 and 2012, Democrats such as David Grosso, Elissa Silverman, and Michael A. Brown changed their party affiliation to Independent when running for council.

To become a candidate for council an individual must be resident of the District of Columbia for at least one year prior to the general election, a registered voter, and hold no other public office for which compensation beyond expenses is received. Candidates running for a ward position must be a resident of that ward.

== Summary ==
Democrats remained the largest party on the council, reelecting every incumbent running, and holding onto wards 3 and 5. Elissa Silverman (Independent, At-large) lost her seat to former Ward 5's councilman Kenyan McDuffie. The Democrats easily swept elections in all four wards, securing more than three fourths of the vote in each. They recorded their worst result in Ward 3 with 75.88% of the vote, performing the weakest in Precinct 9, where they won just 57.02% of the vote. Conversely, the Democrats earned their best performance in Ward 6, where incumbent Charles Allen won 94% of the vote against write-in candidates. DC's tiny Republican Party earned the second places in Wards 3 and 5, while the even smaller Green Party contested Ward 1.

=== At-large ===
Position	Incumbent				Candidates
Position	Member	Party	First elected	Status	Candidates
Chairperson	Phil Mendelson	Democratic	2012 (special)	Incumbent re-elected.	▌ ✓ Phil Mendelson (Democratic) 82.0%; ▌ Darryl LC Moch (D.C. Statehood Green) 9.7%; ▌ Nate Derenge (Republican) 6.7%
At-large	Anita Bonds	Democratic	2013 (special)	Incumbent re-elected.	▌ ✓ Anita Bonds (Democratic) 31.7%; ▌ ✓ Kenyan McDuffie (Independent) 21.9%; ▌ Elissa Silverman (Independent) 19.3%; ▌ Graham McLaughlin (Independent) 10.2%; ▌ Karim D. Marshall (Independent) 5.1%; ▌ David Schwartzman (D.C. Statehood Green) 5.1%; ▌ Giuseppe Niosi (Republican) 3.9%; ▌ Fred Hill (Independent) 2.3%
At-large	Elissa Silverman	Independent	2014	Incumbent lost re-election. New member elected.	▌ ✓ Anita Bonds (Democratic) 31.7%; ▌ ✓ Kenyan McDuffie (Independent) 21.9%; ▌ Elissa Silverman (Independent) 19.3%; ▌ Graham McLaughlin (Independent) 10.2%; ▌ Karim D. Marshall (Independent) 5.1%; ▌ David Schwartzman (D.C. Statehood Green) 5.1%; ▌ Giuseppe Niosi (Republican) 3.9%; ▌ Fred Hill (Independent) 2.3%

=== Wards ===
Position	Incumbent				Candidates
Position	Member	Party	First elected	Status	Candidates
Ward 1	Brianne Nadeau	Democratic	2014	Incumbent re-elected.	▌ ✓ Brianne Nadeau (Democratic) 79.9%; ▌ Chris Otten (D.C. Statehood Green) 17.2%
Ward 3	Mary Cheh	Democratic	2006	Incumbent retired. New member elected. Democratic hold.	▌ ✓ Matthew Frumin (Democratic) 79.9%; ▌ David Krucoff (Republican) 22.7%; ▌ Adrian Salsgiver (Libertarian) 1.1%
Ward 5	Kenyan McDuffie	Democratic	2012 (special)	Incumbent retired. New member elected. Democratic hold.	▌ ✓ Zachary Parker (Democratic) 93.9%; ▌ Clarence Lee Jr. (Republican) 5.4%
Ward 6	Charles Allen	Democratic	2014	Incumbent re-elected.	▌ ✓ Charles Allen (Democratic) 94.0%

== Chairperson ==
Incumbent Chairperson Phil Mendelson was re-elected for a third full term after defeating DC Statehood Green party candidate Darryl Moch and Republican candidate Nate Derenge. He was challenged in the Democratic primary by progressive Erin Palmer.

2022 District of Columbia Chairperson of the Council Election
- November 8, 2022
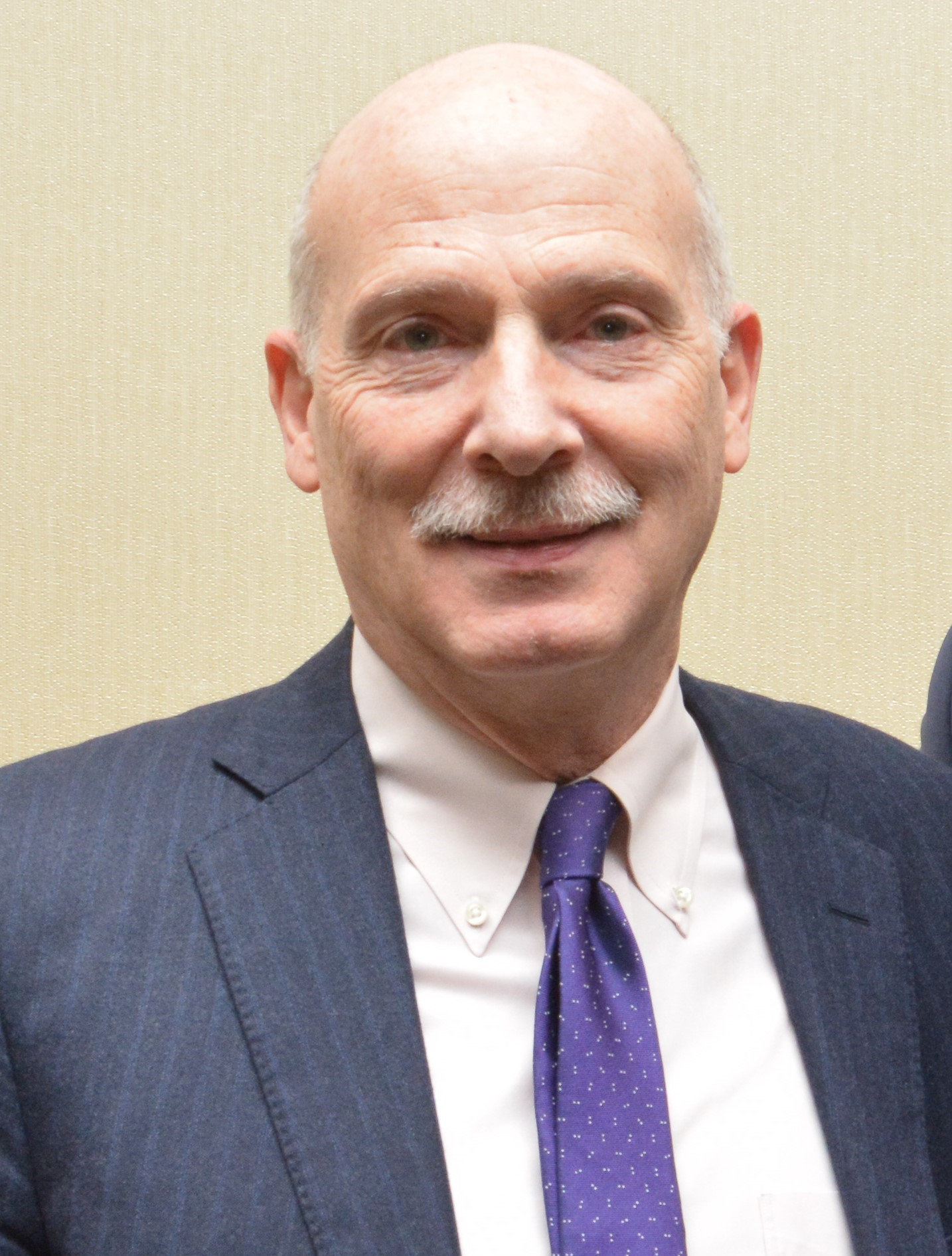

Nominee	Phil Mendelson	Darryl Moch	Nate Derenge
Party	Democratic	DC Statehood Green	Republican
Popular vote	160,896	18,930	13,123
Percentage	83.4%	9.8%	6.8%

Mendelson
70–80%
80–90%
Chairperson before election
Phil Mendelson
Democratic
Elected Chairperson
Phil Mendelson
Democratic

=== Democratic primary ===
Candidates

- Phil Mendelson, incumbent Chairperson (since 2012) from Eastern Market
- Erin Palmer, ethics lawyer and ANC Commissioner for 4B02 from Takoma

Did not qualify for ballot

- Calvin H. Gurley, accountant and perennial candidate

Endorsements

Phil Mendelson

Labor unions

- International Association of Fire Fighters Local 36
- Metropolitan Washington Labor Council, AFL–CIO
- UNITE HERE Local 25

Organizations

- Democrats for Education Reform D.C.
- District of Columbia Association of Realtors
- Sierra Club

Publications

- The Washington Post
Erin Palmer

Individuals

- Henry Cohen, Ward 3 candidate
- Carlene Reid, member of the District of Columbia State Board of Education from Ward 8

Organizations

- Capital Stonewall Democrats
- Greater Greater Washington
- Washington Teachers' Union (AFT Local 6)
- Working Families Party
Declined to endorse

Organizations

- DC Latino Caucus

Democratic primary results by ward: Mendelson: Mendelson—50–60%; Mendelson—60-70%; Palmer: Palmer—60-70%

Chairperson Democratic primary
Party	Candidate	Votes	%
Democratic	Phil Mendelson	64,877	53.16%
Democratic	Erin Palmer	56,671	46.44%
Democratic	Write-in	492	0.40%
Total votes		122,040	100%

=== Republican primary ===
Candidates

- Nate Derenge, supply chain analyst, councilperson candidate in Ward 8 in 2020
- Giuseppe Niosi, Navy reservist

Republican primary results by ward: Derenge: Derenge—80–90%; Derenge—>90%

Chairperson Republican primary
Party	Candidate	Votes	%
Republican	Nate Derenge	2,469	89.95%
Republican	Write-in	276	10.05%
Total votes		2,745	100%

=== General Election ===
2022 Council of the District of Columbia Chairperson election
Party	Candidate	Votes	%
Democratic	Phil Mendelson	160,896	83.4%
DC Statehood Green	Darryl Moch	18,930	9.8%
Republican	Nate Derenge	13,123	6.8%
Total valid votes		192,949	100%
Democratic hold			

== At-large ==
Elections for two at-large seats were held in 2022. Incumbent Democratic councilwoman Anita Bonds was re-elected after being the most voted candidate, while incumbent independent Elissa Silverman was defeated by independent Kenyan McDuffie, formerly a Democrat serving as councilman for ward 5, who came in second.

The first seat may be won by anyone from any party but the second seat is reserved for someone who is not affiliated with the majority party on the council. In practice, these seats are won by candidates registered as independents for the election regardless of previous party affiliations due to the Democratic Party's dominance of city politics. Bonds was challenged by three Democrats in the June 21 primary, all of whom criticized her role as chair of the council's housing committee, but was renominated with 35% of the vote.

2022 District of Columbia At-Large Election
- November 8, 2022
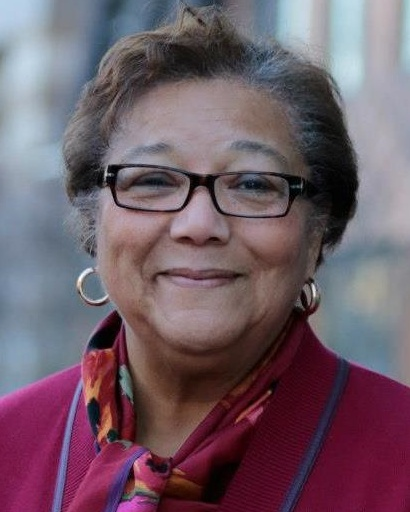

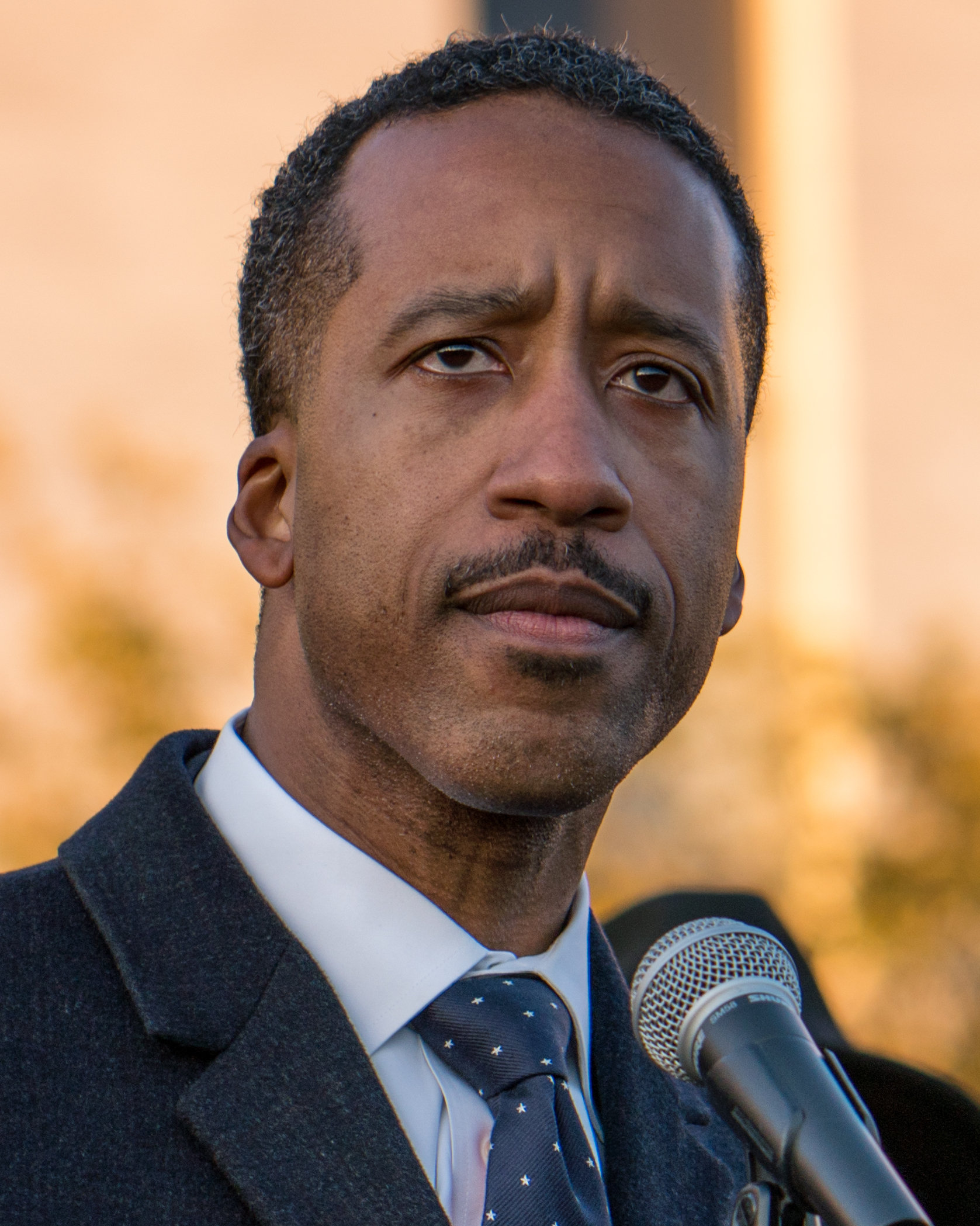

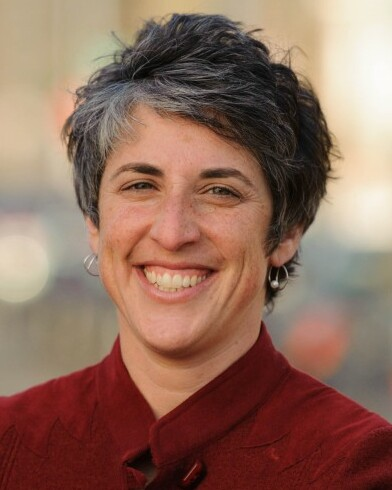
Nominee	Anita Bonds	Kenyan McDuffie	Elissa Silverman
Party	Democratic	Independent	Independent
Popular vote	103,959	71,892	63,457
Percentage	31.8%	22.0%	19.4%
Nominee	Graham McLaughlin	Karim Marshall	David Schwartzman
Party	Independent	Independent	DC Statehood Green
Popular vote	33,388	16,879	16,644
Percentage	10.2%	5.2%	5.1%

Bonds
20–30%
30–40%
40–50%
50–60%
McDuffie
20–30%
30–40%
Silverman
20–30%
30–40%
McLaughlin
20–30%
At-Large Councilpersons before election
Anita Bonds (D)
Elissa Silverman (I)
Elected At-Large Councilpersons
Anita Bonds (D)
Kenyan McDuffie (I)

=== Democratic primary ===
Candidates

- Anita Bonds, incumbent Councilperson (since 2012) from Truxton Circle
- Nate Fleming, Shadow Representative (2013–2015) and staffer for Councilmember Trayon White from Deanwood
- Lisa R. Gore, ANC commissioner for 3/4G-01 from Hawthorne
- Dexter Williams, research analyst for RepresentUs and former staffer for Robert White from Hillcrest

Did not qualify for ballot

- Sharece Crawford, at-large Committeewoman for the DC Democratic Party
- Leniqua'dominique Jenkins, former ANC commissioner for 7C04 and activist
- Ambrose Lane Jr., community activist and co-founder of Black Coalition Against Covid
- Bradley Thomas, attorney and ANC commissioner for 5E05
- Paul Trantham

Declined

- Monika Nemeth, ANC Commissioner for 3F06 (ran in Ward 3)

Endorsements

Anita Bonds

Individuals

- David Catania, at-large Councilperson (1997-2015)
- Arrington Dixon, Council Chairperson (1979-1983)
- Vincent Gray, Councilperson for Ward 7 (since 2017) and former Mayor (2011-2015)
- Phil Mendelson, Council Chairperson (since 2012)
- Jacque Patterson, at-large member of the District of Columbia State Board of Education
- Brandon Todd, Councilperson for Ward 4 (2015–2021)
- Anthony Williams, former Mayor (1999-2007)

Organizations

- District of Columbia Association of Realtors
- LiUNA Mid Atlantic
- UNITE HERE Local 25
Nate Fleming

Publications

- The Washington Post
Lisa Gore

Individuals

- Henry Cohen, ward 3 candidate
- Anthony J. Motley, pastor

Organizations

- GreaterGreaterWashington
- National Organization for Women
Dexter Williams

Organizations

- DC Latino Caucus
- Washington Teachers' Union (AFT Local 6)
No endorsement
- Capital Stonewall Democrats
- Metropolitan Washington Labor Council, AFL–CIO

Democratic primary results by ward: Bonds: Bonds—30–40%; Bonds—40–50%; Bonds—50–60%; Fleming: Fleming—30–40%; Gore: Gore—30–40%

At-Large Democratic primary
Party	Candidate	Votes	%
Democratic	Anita Bonds	42,421	35.85%
Democratic	Lisa Gore	33,225	28.08%
Democratic	Nate Fleming	32,815	27.73%
Democratic	Dexter Williams	9,356	7.91%
Democratic	Write-in	504	0.43%
Total votes		118,321	100%
n/a	Overvotes	267	
n/a	Undervotes	9,743	

=== Republican primary ===
Candidates

- Giuseppe Urberto Niosi, contractor

Republican primary results by ward: Niosi: Niosi—80–90%; Niosi—>90%

At-Large Republican primary
Party	Candidate	Votes	%
Republican	Giuseppe Niosi	2,576	91.80%
Republican	Write-in	230	8.20%
Total votes		2,806	100%
n/a	Overvotes	9	
n/a	Undervotes	366	

=== Statehood Green primary ===
No candidates appeared on the Statehood Green primary ballot, but David Schwartzman received the party's nomination through write-ins.

At-Large Statehood Green primary
Party	Candidate	Votes	%
DC Statehood Green	Write-in	342	100%
Total votes		342	100%
n/a	Undervotes	158	

=== Independents ===
Candidates

- Frederick Hill, businessman and candidate for Ward 8 in 2020
- Karim D. Marshall, attorney
- Kenyan McDuffie, Councilmember for Ward 5 (2012–present)
- Graham McLaughlin, businessman
- Jennifer Muhammad
- Elissa Silverman, incumbent Councilperson (2015–present)

Endorsements

Kenyan McDuffie

Individuals

- Tom Perez, former Democratic National Committee Chairman (2017–2021), former United States Secretary of Labor (2013–2017), and former Maryland Secretary of Labor (2007–2009) (Democratic)

Publications

- The Washington Post
Graham McLaughlin

Publications

- The Washington Post
Elissa Silverman

Individuals

- Karl Racine, Attorney General for the District of Columbia (2015-present) (Democratic)

Organizations

- Sierra Club

=== General election ===
2022 Council of the District of Columbia At-large election
Party	Candidate	Votes	%
Democratic	Anita Bonds	103,991	31.7%
Independent	Kenyan McDuffie	71,924	21.9%
Independent	Elissa Silverman	63,471	19.3%
Independent	Graham McLaughlin	33,402	10.2%
Independent	Karim D. Marshall	16,883	5.1%
DC Statehood Green	David Schwartzman	16,650	5.1%
Republican	Giuseppe Niosi	12,832	3.9%
Independent	Fred Hill	7,494	2.3%
Write-in		1,620	0.5%
Total valid votes		328.267	100%

== Ward 1 ==
2022 District of Columbia Ward 1 Election
- November 8, 2022
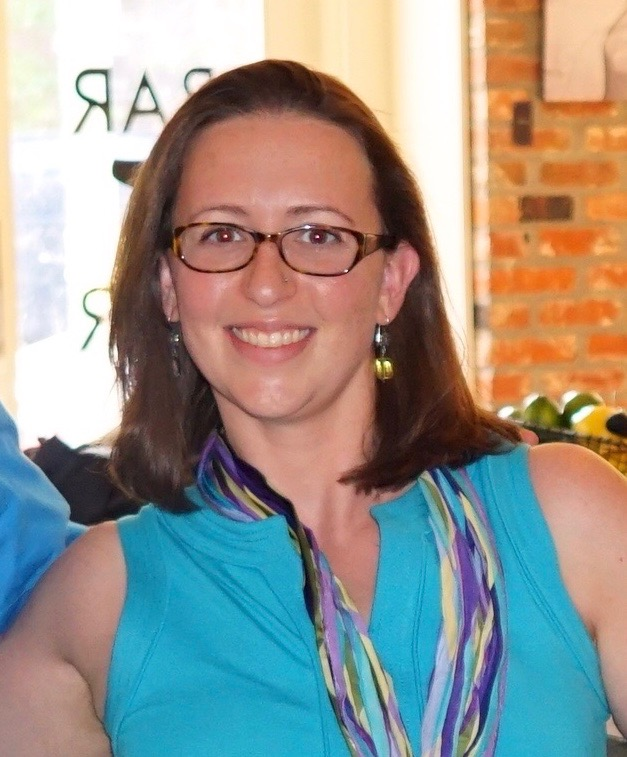

Nominee	Brianne Nadeau	Chris Otten
Party	Democratic	DC Statehood Green
Popular vote	19,540	4,192
Percentage	79.94%	17.15%
Councilperson before election
Brianne Nadeau
Democratic
Elected Councilperson
Brianne Nadeau
Democratic

=== Democratic primary ===
Candidates

- Salah Czapery, former police officer from Adams Morgan
- Sabel Harris, ANC Commissioner for 1B12 (since 2021) from U Street Corridor
- Brianne Nadeau, incumbent Councilperson (since 2015) from Park View

Endorsements

Salah Czapary

Organizations

- LGBTQ Victory Fund

Publications

- The Washington Post
Brianne Nadeau

Individuals

- Charles Allen, councilperson from Ward 6 (2015-present)
- Henry Cohen, ward 3 candidate
- Janeese Lewis George, councilperson from Ward 4 (2021-present)
- Karl Racine, Attorney General for the District of Columbia (2015-present)
- Elissa Silverman, at-large Councilperson (2015-present)
- Robert White, at-large Councilperson (2016-present)

Organizations

- Capital Stonewall Democrats
- DC Latino Caucus
- Metropolitan Washington Labor Council, AFL–CIO
- Sierra Club DC
- Washington Teachers' Union (AFT Local 6)
- Working Families Party
No endorsement

Organizations

- District of Columbia Association of Realtors

Ward 1 Democratic primary
Party	Candidate	Votes	%
Democratic	Brianne Nadeau	7,976	48.46%
Democratic	Salah Czapary	5,092	30.94%
Democratic	Sabel Harris	3,351	20.36%
Democratic	Write-in	40	0.24%
Total votes		16,459	100%

=== General election ===
2022 Ward 1 election
Party	Candidate	Votes	%
Democratic	Brianne Nadeau	19,540	79.94%
DC Statehood Green	Chris Otten	4,192	17.15%
Write-in		711	2.91%
Total valid votes		24,443	100%
Democratic hold			

== Ward 3 ==
Incumbent Councilperson Mary Cheh initially signaled that she would run for reelection, but announced on February 11 that she was ending her campaign. At the time of her announcement, Cheh had only two opponents, Brown and Nemeth. Within hours, Cheh's former campaign treasurer, Matt Frumin announced his candidacy. In the following days, several more candidates announced bids for the now-open seat. Ultimately, nine candidates made the primary ballot. Receiving an endorsement from The Washington Post, Eric Goulet became the premier moderate candidate in the race and raised a significant amount of money from outside groups such as the DC Association of Realtors and Democrats for Education Reform. On June 13, spurred by massive outside spending from pro-charter school groups, Tricia Duncan withdrew her campaign and endorsed Matt Frumin. The following day, ANC Commissioner Ben Bergmann and student Henry Cohen withdrew their campaigns in support of Frumin.

Following these developments, councilmembers George, Allen, and Silverman endorsed Frumin, leading to further consolidation.

2022 District of Columbia Ward 3 Election
- November 8, 2022
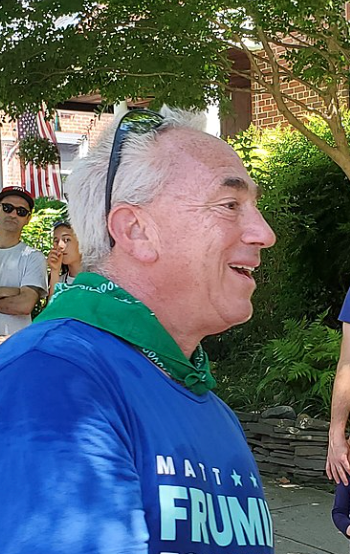

Nominee	Matt Frumin	David Krucoff
Party	Democratic	Republican
Popular vote	22,962	6,853
Percentage	75.9%	22.7%
Ward 3 Councilperson before election
Mary Cheh
Democratic
Elected Ward 3 Councilperson
Matt Frumin
Democratic

=== Democratic primary ===
Candidates

- Deirdre Brown, former ANC Commissioner
- Beau Finley, ANC Commissioner for 3C04
- Matt Frumin, former ANC Commissioner and at-large council candidate in 2013
- Eric Goulet, former senior counsel for Councilperson Vincent C. Gray and candidate for this seat in 2006
- Monte Monash, businesswoman and Chair of the DC Public Library Board of Trustees
- Phil Thomas, chair of Ward 3 Democrats, outreach staffer for Mayor Muriel Bowser, and former ANC Commissioner

Withdrawn

- Ben Bergmann, ANC Commissioner for 3D08 (endorsed Frumin)
- Mary Cheh, incumbent Councilperson (since 2006) (endorsed Duncan, then Frumin)
- Henry Cohen, student and 2021 Democracy Summer Fellow (endorsed Frumin)
- Tricia Duncan, Chair of Palisades Community Association (endorsed Frumin)
- Monika Nemeth, ANC Commissioner for 3F06

Declined

- Matthew Cohen, ANC Commissioner
- Petar Dimtchev, attorney and candidate for Ward 3 in 2018
- Tracy Hadden Loh, member of the Washington Metropolitan Area Transit Authority Board of Directors
- Bill Rice, former DC Department of Transportation spokesman and candidate for this seat in 2006
- Ruth Wattenberg, member of the District of Columbia State Board of Education for Ward 3 (since 2015)

Endorsements

Tricia Duncan (withdrawn)

Individuals

- ~~Mary Cheh, incumbent Councilperson (since 2007)~~ (switched endorsement to Frumin after Duncan withdrew)
Matthew Frumin

Individuals

- Charles Allen, Councilperson from Ward 6 (since 2015)
- Ben Bergmann, ANC Commissioner for 3D08 and withdrawn candidate for this seat
- Mary Cheh, incumbent Councilperson (since 2007)
- Henry Cohen, student and withdrawn candidate for this seat
- Tricia Duncan, Chair of Palisades Community Association and withdrawn candidate for this seat
- Janeese Lewis George, Councilperson from Ward 4 (since 2021)
- Karl Racine, Attorney General for the District of Columbia (2015-present)
- Elissa Silverman, at-large Councilperson (since 2015)
- Ruth Wattenberg, member of the District of Columbia State Board of Education for Ward 3 (since 2015)

Organizations

- International Association of Fire Fighters Local 36
- SEIU 32BJ
- Sierra Club (Endorsed after primary)
- Washington Teachers' Union (AFT Local 6)
Eric Goulet

Individuals

- Vincent Gray, Councilperson for Ward 7 (since 2017) and former Mayor (2011-2015)
- Anthony Williams, former Mayor (1999-2007)

Organizations

- DC Police Union
- Democrats for Education Reform D.C.
- District of Columbia Association of Realtors

Publications

- The Washington Post
Monte Monash

Individuals

- Tommy Wells, Councilperson for Ward 6 (2007-2015)
No endorsement

Organizations

- Capital Stonewall Democrats
- DC Latino Caucus
- Metropolitan Washington Labor Council, AFL–CIO

Debates and forums for Ward 3 Democratic primary candidates
Date	Place	Host	Participants								
P Participant. I Invitee. A Absent. N Confirmed non-invitee. O Out of race (exploring, suspended, or not yet entered)			Bergmann	Brown	Cohen	Duncan	Finley	Frumin	Goulet	Monash	Thomas
April 25, 2022	Online	Capital Stonewall Democrats	P	P	P	P	P	P	P	A	P

Ward 3 Democratic primary
Party	Candidate	Votes	%
Democratic	Matthew Frumin	8,012	42.28
Democratic	Eric Goulet	5,641	29.77
Democratic	Phil Thomas	1,087	5.74
Democratic	Beau Finley	958	5.06
Democratic	Tricia Duncan (withdrawn)	921	4.86
Democratic	Ben Bergmann (withdrawn)	753	3.97
Democratic	Monte Monash	848	4.47
Democratic	Deirdre Brown	517	2.73
Democratic	Henry Z Cohen (withdrawn)	194	1.02
Democratic	Write-in	19	0.10
Total votes		18,950	100.00

=== Republican primary ===
Candidates

- David Krucoff, District of Columbia retrocession activist and independent candidate for delegate in 2020

Ward 3 Republican primary
Party	Candidate	Votes	%
Republican	David Krucoff	666	89.76
Republican	Write-in	76	10.24
Total votes		742	100.00

=== General election ===
2022 Council of the District of Columbia Ward 3 election
Party	Candidate	Votes	%
Democratic	Matthew Frumin	22,962	75.9%
Republican	David Krucoff	6,853	22.7%
Libertarian	Adrian Salsgiver	327	1.1%
Write-in		118	0.4%
Total valid votes		192,949	100%
Democratic hold			

== Ward 5 ==
2022 District of Columbia Ward 5 Election
- November 8, 2022
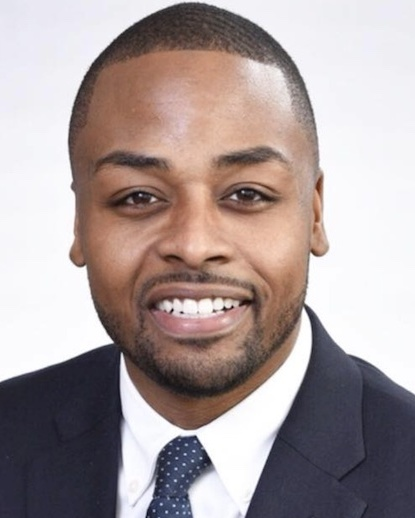

Nominee	Zachary Parker	Clarence Lee Jr.
Party	Democratic	Republican
Popular vote	25,554	1,474
Percentage	93.9%	5.4%
Ward 5 Councilperson before election
Kenyan McDuffie
Democratic
Elected Ward 5 Councilperson
Zachary Parker
Democratic

Incumbent Councilperson Kenyan McDuffie announced in October 2021 that he would not be seeking election to the council. Instead, he opted to run to succeed retiring Karl Racine as Attorney General. In early 2022, it was reported that Zachary Parker led his opponents in fundraising, with much of his money coming from notable DC progressives. His closest opponent, Faith Gibson Hubbard, had donors that overlapped with previous donors to the more moderate Mayor Bowser. Parker won the primary election and was chosen as the Democratic nominee. He went on to win the general election with more than 93% of the vote in the overwhelmingly Democratic ward.

=== Democratic primary ===
Candidates

- Gordon Fletcher, Ward 5 Democratic Chair and ANC Commissioner for 5A08
- Kathy Henderson, ANC Commissioner
- Faith Gibson Hubbard, Bowser administration official
- Gary Johnson, education activist
- Art Lloyd, retired deputy U.S. Marshal
- Vincent Orange, At-large Councilperson (2011–2016) and Councilperson for Ward 5 (1999–2007)
- Zachary Parker, Member of the D.C. State Board of Education (since 2019)

Did not qualify for ballot

- Lauren Rogers, ANC Commissioner for 5C02 (since 2019)

Withdrawn

- Harry Thomas Jr., Councilperson for Ward 5 (2007-2012) (running for Shadow Representative)

Declined

- Kenyan McDuffie, incumbent Councilperson (since 2012)

Endorsements

Faith Gibson Hubbard

Individuals

- David Grosso, former at-large Councilperson (2013–2021)
- Christina Henderson, at-large Councilperson (2021–present)
- Kenyan McDuffie, incumbent Ward 5 Councilperson (since 2012)

Publications

- The Washington Post

Organizations

- National Organization for Women
Vincent Orange

Individuals

- Franklin Garcia, District of Columbia Shadow Representative (2015–2021)
- John L. Ray, at-large Councilperson (1979–1997)
Zachary Parker

Organizations

- Capital Stonewall Democrats
- LGBTQ Victory Fund
- Metro DC Democratic Socialists of America
- Metropolitan Washington Labor Council, AFL–CIO
- UNITE HERE Local 25
- Washington Teachers' Union (AFT Local 6)
- Working Families Party

Individuals

- Henry Cohen, Ward 3 candidate
- Janeese Lewis George, councilperson for Ward 4 (since 2021)
- Ed Lazere, candidate for Council of the District of Columbia in 2018
- Karl Racine, Attorney General for the District of Columbia (since 2015)
No endorsement

Organizations

- DC Latino Caucus
- District of Columbia Association of Realtors

Debates for Ward 5 Democratic primary candidates
Date	Place	Host	Participants								
P Participant. I Invitee. A Absent. N Confirmed non-invitee. O Out of race (exploring, suspended, or not yet entered).			Fletcher	Gibson Hubbard	Lloyd	Johnson	Henderson	Orange	Parker	Rogers	Thomas
November 10, 2021	Online	D.C. for Democracy	P	P	O	O	O	P	P	O	P
April 30, 2022	Union Wesley AME Zion Church	Queen Chapel Civic Association and Union Wesley AME Zion Church	P	P	A	A	A	P	P	O	O

Ward 5 Democratic primary
Party	Candidate	Votes	%
Democratic	Zachary Parker	7,761	43.52
Democratic	Faith Gibson Hubbard	4,353	24.41
Democratic	Vincent Orange	2,736	15.34
Democratic	Gordon "The People's Champion" Fletcher	1,941	10.88
Democratic	Kathy Henderson	787	4.41
Democratic	Gary To-To Johnson	149	0.84
Democratic	Art Lloyd	69	0.39
Democratic	Write-in	37	0.21
Total votes		17,833	100.00

=== Republican primary ===
Candidates

- Clarence Lee Jr.

Ward 5 Republican primary
Party	Candidate	Votes	%
Republican	Clarence Lee, Jr.	177	82.71
Republican	Write-in	37	17.29
Total votes		214	100.00

=== General election ===
2022 Council of the District of Columbia Ward 5 election
Party	Candidate	Votes	%
Democratic	Zachary Parker	25,554	93.9
Republican	Clarence Lee, Jr	1,474	5.41
Write-in		196	0.72
Total valid votes		27,224	100.00
Democratic hold			

== Ward 6 ==
2022 District of Columbia Ward 6 Election
- November 8, 2022
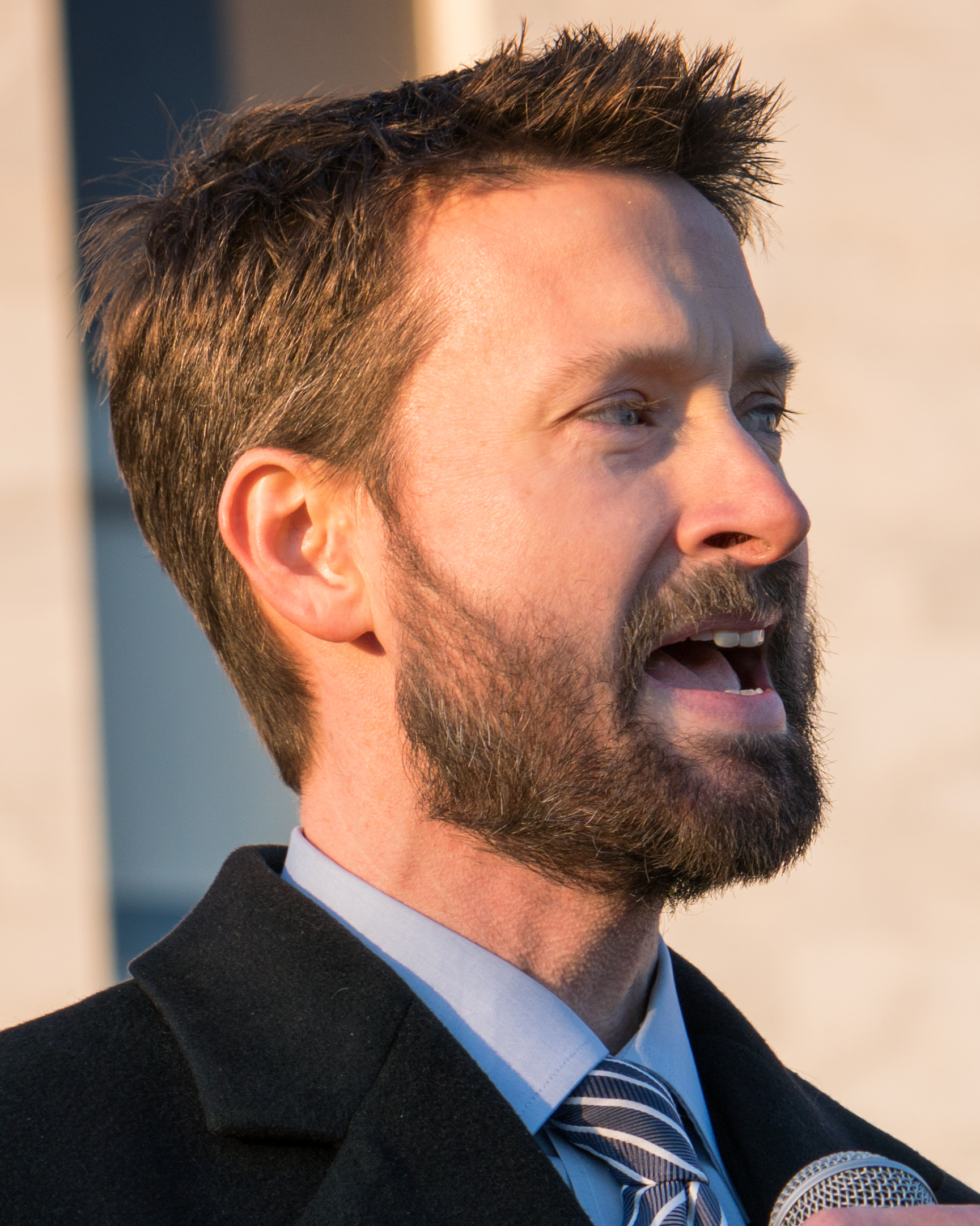

Nominee	Charles Allen	Write-in
Party	Democratic
Popular vote	25,596	1,635
Percentage	94.0%	6.0%
Ward 6 Councilperson before election
Charles Allen
Democratic
Elected Ward 6 Councilperson
Charles Allen
Democratic

Incumbent Democratic councilperson Charles Allen was re-elected unopposed in the general election after winning the primary without a challenger.

=== Democratic primary ===
Candidates

- Charles Allen, incumbent Councilperson (since 2015)

Endorsements

Charles Allen

Organizations

- Capital Stonewall Democrats
- DC Latino Caucus
- District of Columbia Association of Realtors
- Metropolitan Washington Labor Council, AFL–CIO
- National Organization for Women
- Sierra Club DC
- Washington Teachers' Union (AFT Local 6)

Ward 6 Democratic primary
Party	Candidate	Votes	%
Democratic	Charles Allen	14,541	96.34
Democratic	Write-in	553	3.66
Total votes		15,094	100.00

=== General election ===
2022 Council of the District of Columbia Ward 6 election
Party	Candidate	Votes	%
Democratic	Charles Allen	25,596	94.0
Write-in		1,635	6.0
Total valid votes		27,231	100.00
Democratic hold			

== See also ==
- 2022 Washington, D.C., mayoral election
- 2022 District of Columbia Attorney General election
