= Hawthorne station =

Hawthorne station may refer to:

== Hawthorne, New Jersey ==
- Hawthorne station (NJ Transit)
- Hawthorne station (New York, Susquehanna and Western Railroad)

== Hawthorne, New York ==
- Hawthorne station (Metro-North)

== Cicero, Illinois ==
- Hawthorne station (Illinois Central Railroad)

== See also ==
- Hawthorne (disambiguation)
- Hawthorn (disambiguation)
- Hawthorne House (disambiguation)
- Hawthorn railway station, Melbourne
- The Hawthorns station
- Hawthorn Station, Illinois
