= The Hawthorns (disambiguation) =

The Hawthorns is a football stadium in West Bromwich, Sandwell, England.

It may also refer to:

- The Hawthorns station, the tram stop that serves the football stadium
- The Hawthorns (house), a heritage-listed house in the Melbourne suburb of Hawthorn, in Australia
- The Hawthorns (University of Bristol), a student residence at the University of Bristol

== See also ==
- Hawthorn (disambiguation)
- Hawthorne (disambiguation)
