= Goldfinch =

Goldfinch or The Goldfinch may refer to:

== Birds ==
- European goldfinch, Carduelis carduelis
- Some species of the genus Spinus:
  - American goldfinch, Spinus tristis
  - Lawrence's goldfinch, Spinus lawrencei
  - Lesser goldfinch, Spinus psaltria

== Arts, entertainment, and media ==
- The Goldfinch (painting) (1654), by Carel Fabritius
- The Goldfinch (novel) (2013) by Donna Tartt, in which Fabritius' painting features
  - The Goldfinch (film) (2019), based on the novel
- Distelfink, a goldfinch motif in Pennsylvania Dutch folk art

== Science and technology ==
- USS Goldfinch, US Navy ships
- HMS Goldfinch, four ships of the Royal Navy and one of the shore establishment
- Gloster Goldfinch, a British single-seat biplane fighter from the later 1920s

== People ==
- Goldfinch (surname)
