= Al-Zarnug =

Al-Zarnug: אלזרנוג (Hebrew); الزرنوق (Arabic)
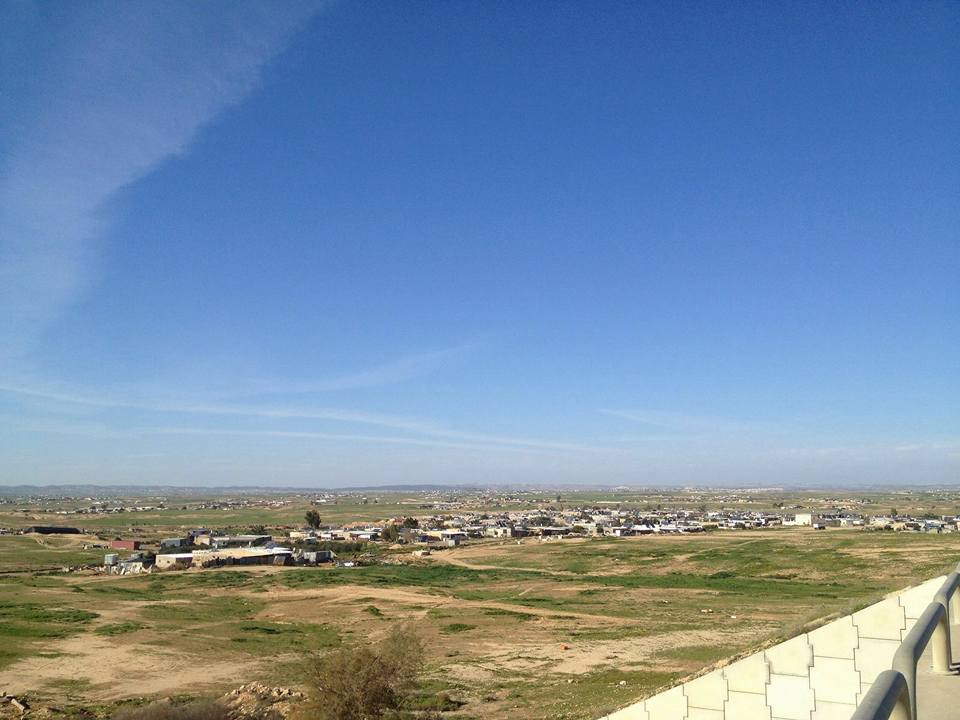
- Al-Zarnug Western Neighborhood 2016

- Location within Northern Negev region of Israel
- Coordinates: 31°12′26″N 34°55′24″E
- Country: Israel
- District: Southern
- Population: Approximately 5,000

Al-Zarnug (Arabic: الزرنوق; Hebrew: א-זרנוג) is an unrecognized Bedouin village located in the Negev Desert in southern Israel about 12 kilometres (7.5 mi) from Be’er Sheva. The village is home to approximately 5,000 residents, most of whom belong to the Abu Queider tribe and for this reason the village is also referred to as "Abu Queider". As of 2024, the village has not been granted planning rights or municipal services.

== Demography ==
According to unofficial estimates, the village's population is around 5,000 people. The village is inhabited by members of the Abu Queider Bedouin clan and other local Bedouin families.

== Status and Infrastructure ==
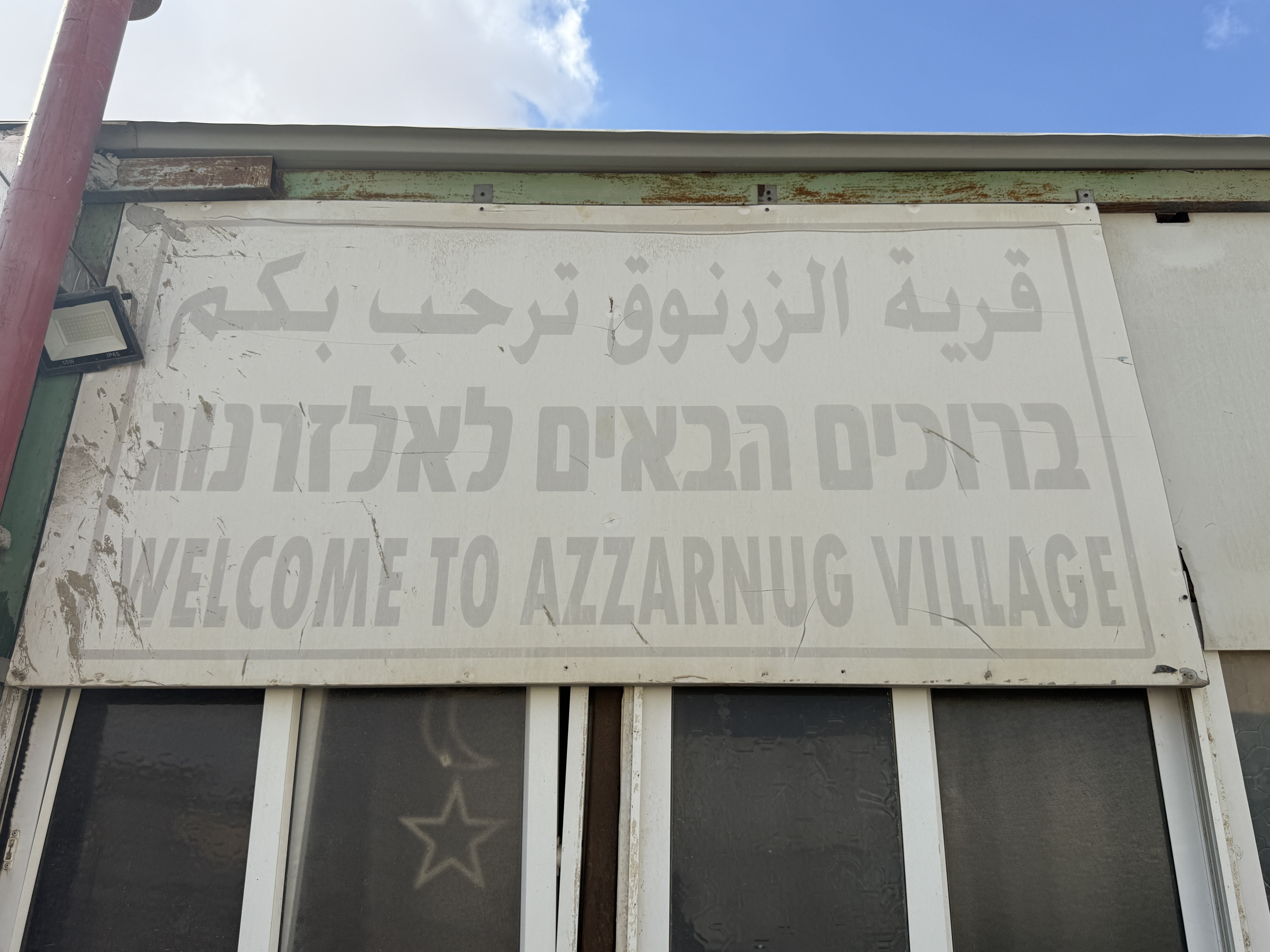
Welcome sign at the entrance to Al-Zarnug (Azzarnug)

The site became contested after Jewish heirs of a 1935 land purchase (654 dunams by Persian Jewish investors) claimed ownership through Israeli courts in the 2010s, supported by the right-wing NGO Regavim. This was despite the land within the Negev being the ancestral grazing lands lived on by Tarabin Bedouins for generations.

The village is centered on a large mosque, the Al-Rahma Mosque, which was built in 1979 and is considered the first mosque built in an unrecognized village in the Negev.

The village has witnessed several cases of house demolitions under the pretext of unlicensed construction and lives under the constant threat of forced displacement in accordance with the Prawer Plan, which was approved by the Israeli government. The 2011 plan involves the relocation of some 40,000–70,000 Negev Bedouin from areas such as Al Zarnug, not recognized by the government.

A primary and middle school, Neve Midbar, was built in 2000, serving 900 students from Al-Zarnug and neighboring villages. After a prolonged legal battle with the pro-settler group, Regavim, which sought to confiscate land and block construction, a high school opened in 2019. Medical care is provided by a small, overcrowded clinic with limited hours and no pharmacy due to inadequate refrigeration.

The planned community of Omrit is slated to be built on the land of Al-Zarnug, separating the village from the neighboring unrecognized village of Bir al-Mashash.

In 2013 Over 1000 people protested forced demolitions and expulsions resulting in the arrest of over 20 protestors.

In 2017, Negev Bedouin protested the planned removal of the residents of Al-Zarnug to Rahat.

In 2022 Bulldozers were sent to destroy Bedouin protest tents continuing to advocate against the relocation of villagers from Al Zarnug, due to housing shortages in Rahat.
