= Frasin (Palestine) =

Palestinian village and archaeological site in the West Bank

Firasin فراسين Ifrasin
- Village
- State: Palestine
- Governorate: Jenin

Firasin (Arabic: فراسين), also pronounced as Ifrasin, is a Palestinian village in the Jenin Governorate of the northern West Bank, southwest of Jenin. It occupies a hillock 2.5 km southeast of Qaffin, along an ancient east–west road across northern Samaria.

== History ==
Yitzhak Magen and Michael Avi-Yonah identified Firasin with Kefar Parshai (Hebrew: כפר פרשאי) mentioned in the Babylonian Talmud (Abodah Zarah, 31a). The site contains column, as well as capitals bases in secondary use, along with a stone-paved that might have belonged to a place of worship.

=== Crusader and Mamluk periods ===
During the Crusader period, Firasin belonged to the district of Caesarea. In 1265, following the Mamluk conquest of the area under Baibars, Baybars assigned its lands to the emir Rukn al-Din Khaz Turq al-Kabir al-Salihi. "Medieval-period pottery," in Adam Zertal terms, comprised 30% of the ceramic assemblage collected during the Manasseh Hill Country Survey, the largest chronological component represented in the survey sample.

In 1998, archaeologist Eyal Maharian uncovered a mosque from the thirteenth century which continued to be used during the Ottoman period. It consisted of a rectangular prayer hall measuring 8 by 7.5 metres. Four marble columns were incorporated into the structure, while a semicircular mihrab was set into the southern wall in the direction of prayer. The excavation also revealed a second wall niche, a staircase, a stone-paved courtyard and a rock-cut, plastered cistern.

=== Ottoman period ===
In the Ottoman tax registers of 1596, Firasin was listed in the Qaqun subdistrict with twelve Muslim taxpayers. The inhabitants were taxed for wheat, barley, summer crops and olives, among other revenues.

Edward Robinson, travelling through the region in 1852, passed Firasin while travelling from Ya'bad toward Attil. The 1870s, the Palestine Exploration Fund's Survey of Western Palestine described Ferasin as a small village situated on a rocky hillock, with a well to its southeast.

Israeli historical-geographer David Grossman proposed that Firasin was depopulated around 1836 and subsequently served as a stronghold of the ʿAbd al-Hadi family, although he also noted that the locality continued to be recorded as inhabited in later sources. Adam Zertal and Nivi Mirkam questioned this chronology, noting that the Survey of Western Palestine still described Firasin as an inhabited "small village" in the 1870s.

=== British Mandate ===
In 1931 it had five houses. According to Zertal and Mirkam, by 1936 Firasin was an estate associated with the ʿAbd al-Hadi family, one of whose members was active in the 1936–1939 Arab revolt in Palestine. The estate consisted of two large structures built over arches and comprised several rooms arranged around courtyards; the eastern structure measured 15 by 20 metres, while the western structure measured about 15 by 25 metres.

According to Zertal and Mirkam, by 1936 Firasin was an estate associated with the ʿAbd al-Hadi family, one of whose members was active in the 1936–1939 Arab revolt in Palestine. In 1945, The village had a total land area of 6,672 dunams, of which 4,326 dunams were Arab-owned and 2,346 dunams were public land; no land was recorded as Jewish-owned. Of this area, 576 dunams were used for plantations and irrigable land, 1,122 dunams for cereals, and 2 dunams were built-up.

=== Jordanian rule ===
In 1949 the village came under Jordanian control, and served also as a Jordanian military post.. Trenches and bunkers constructed into and alongside the earlier fortifications.

=== Under Israeli occupation ===
In 1967 the village was occupied by Israel following the 1967 war. In 1984, the Israeli settlement of Hermesh was established by the Mishkei Herut Beitar settlement organization on village land. Their motivation for living in the region is not ideology but quality of life.

== Demography ==
In the 1922 census of Palestine, Firasin had a population of 14, increasing to 24 in the 1931 census of Palestine. By 1945, its population was estimated at 20.

In 2023, the village was home to 200 people.

== Settler attacks and human rights violations ==
Firasin had been subjected to repeated Israeli settler violence, which human rights organizations described as part of a broader pattern of violence and human rights abuses against Palestinians throughout the West Bank.

In 2018, Ahmad ʿAmarna, a resident of the town of Qaffin, planted 2,500 trees on his family's land in Firasin.

Around 2019, Israeli settlers established the illegal outpost “Havat El Naveh” (Hebrew: חוות אל-נווה) 1.5 kilometers northeast of the orchards. The settlers soon started to raid the orchard with their livestock. On 29 July 2020, Israeli forces entered Firasin and issued 36 demolition orders encompassing the entire village, which at the time had 200 residents. On 10 August, the Israeli Civil Administration demolished the residence of Basil Fayez Muhammad Khadr ʿAmarna and the village water reservoir providing water for 35 people and for irrigating 150 dunams.

According to the Israeli settler NGO Regavim, the movement contacted the Israeli Civil Administration and demanded the residents be removed and an immediate halt to the construction be enforced. The Civil Administration subsequently issued what Regavim describes as a “stop destruction of antiquities” order. Accordingly, on 7 January 2021 Israeli troops and KAMAT officials raided Yusuf Muhammad ʿAmarna's home, inhabited by a family with five children.The troops confiscated two wooden doors, iron windows, five water tanks, and an electrical transformer, and damaged furniture, on the pretense of protecting antiquities. On 22 August 2022, following another appeal from Regavim, Israeli forces razed the home of Saleh Muhammad ʿAmarna and seven members of his family, without prior warning, and with Palestinians reporting the family was prevented removing its possessions before the destruction.

After the start of the Gaza War, in October 2023, the settlers vandalized 500 trees. The vigilante action was followed by more formal destruction of houses and infrastructure, with the Israeli Civil Administration demolishing five residential rooms, as well as the local electricity and water networks in Firasin.

On 3 February 2024, Israeli settlers accompanied by Israeli forces stormed Firasin, raiding homes and damaging property belonging to Basil 'Amarna, Muhammad 'Amarna, and Wajdi Mustafa. The settlers also raided a poultry farm owned by Malik al-Zabin, vandalized its contents, tore greenhouse sheeting, smashed surveillance screens, and seized camera recordings to protect their identity. On 4 February, settlers again attacked Firasin and threw stones at residents' houses.

On 12 May 2024 settlers assaulted five native residents of Firasin: Osama Mahmoud Ali ʿAmarna, Muhammad Ahmad Nasser ʿAmarna, Wasim Fayez Muhammad ʿAmarna, Faraj Ali Mahmoud ʿAmarna, and 12-year-old Mahmoud Ali Mahmoud ʿAmarna. The settlers also smashed the windows of Muhammad Ahmad Nasser ʿAmarna's vehicle unprovoked.

In June 2024 settlers raided Firasin and assaulted its residents.

In September 2025, the settlers cut down and destroyed about 980 trees, totally demolishing the orchards’ costly irrigation systems. Israeli police arrived, but took no action. Between August and November 2025, settlers completed the destruction of the Palestinian orchard by felling a thousand additional trees and destroyed irrigation systems in other orchards.

In June 2026, settler authorities provided the ideological framework for the assault on Frasin's civilian population, describing them as "invaders" intruding on an ancient biblical/second temple site. Regavim sent an written appeal to security officials, the Civil Administration, and the Israel Police, demanding action against Palestinian presence in Frasin, claiming that it is "is identified with the biblical name ‘Peresh’ and the Talmudic name ‘Kfar Parshai.’” Settler chief Yossi Dagan, head of the Shomron Regional Council, said:

“The heritage and archaeological sites in Samaria are a national treasure that tells the story of the Jewish people in the Land of Israel over thousands of years. Khirbet Frasin is a site of exceptional historical and archaeological importance, and therefore action must be taken to preserve and protect it. An open history book is being erased. The authorities must turn the table over.”

In August 2026, Israeli settlers had cut dozens of guava and avocado trees at Firasin; after similar attacks had destroyed hundreds of trees during the preceding agricultural season.

== See also ==
- Archaeology of Palestine
