= Hawthorne =

Hawthorne often refers to the American writer Nathaniel Hawthorne.

Hawthorne may also refer to:

== Places ==
Australia

- Hawthorne, Queensland, a suburb of Brisbane

Canada

- Hawthorne Village, Ontario, a suburb of Milton, Ontario

United States

- Hawthorne (Prairieville, Alabama), a plantation house listed on the National Register of Historic Places in Hale County, Alabama
- Hawthorne, California
  - Hawthorne Municipal Airport (California) in Hawthorne, California
- Hawthorne, Florida
- Hawthorne Township, White County, Illinois
- Hawthorne, Iowa
- Hawthorne, Louisville, Kentucky
- Hawthorne, Minneapolis, Minnesota
- Hawthorne, Nevada
  - Hawthorne Army Depot near Hawthorne, Nevada
- Hawthorne, New Jersey
- Hawthorne, New York
- Hawthorne, Portland, Oregon
- Hawthorne, Philadelphia, Pennsylvania
- Hawthorne, Washington, D.C.
- Hawthorne, Wisconsin, a town
- Hawthorne (community), Wisconsin, an unincorporated community
- Hawthorne Bridge, Portland, Oregon
- Hawthorne Race Course near Chicago, Illinois

== Roads ==
- Hawthorne Boulevard (disambiguation)

== Other uses ==
- Hawthorne (surname)
- Hawthorne (book), by Henry James about Nathaniel Hawthorne's writings
- Hawthorne, CA (album), a compilation album by The Beach Boys, released in 2001.
- Hawthorne College, former American college
- Hawthorne effect, an industrial psychology phenomenon
- Hawthorne Heights, an American band
- Hawthorne Works, a huge Western Electric facility in Cicero, Illinois
- Hawthorne (TV series), a medical drama starring Jada Pinkett Smith
- Hawthorne the Hermit Crab, a fictional character in the comic strip Sherman's Lagoon
- Hawthorne (crater), a crater on Mercury
- Hawthorne strainer, a bar accessory

== See also ==
- Hawthorn (disambiguation) - includes common hawthorn berry tree
- Hawthorne House (disambiguation)
- Hawthorne Nevada Airlines Flight 708
- Hawthorne station (disambiguation)
