= Haw =

Haw or HAW may refer to:

== Fruit ==
- many species of hawthorn (Crataegus)
  - Haw flakes, Chinese sweets made from the fruit of the Chinese hawthorn, Crataegus pinnatifida
- several species of Viburnum, including:
  - Viburnum rufidulum
  - Viburnum prunifolium
  - Viburnum nudum

== Places ==
- New Haw, a village in Surrey, England
- Haw River, a tributary of the Cape Fear River in north central North Carolina
  - Haw River Valley AVA
- Hawaii, United States
- Haverfordwest Aerodrome, in Pembrokeshire, Wales (IATA airport code)

== People ==
- Haw (surname)
- Adrian Hardy Haworth (1767–1833), English entomologist and botanist with standard author abbreviation Haw.
- Horace Tabor (1830–1899), American prospector, businessman and politician

=== Characters ===
- Miriallia Haw, a fictional character in the anime Gundam SEED

== Other uses ==
- Chin Haw, Chinese people who migrated to Thailand
- Haw wars (1865–1890), fought against Chinese quasi-military forces invading parts of Tonkin and Thailand
- Hamburg University of Applied Sciences (German: Hochschule für Angewandte Wissenschaften Hamburg)
- Hawaiian language
- Hawthorn railway station, Melbourne
- Supreme Court of Hawaii, in legal documents
- Heavy Airlift Wing, an international airlift organization
- Nictitating membrane, a transparent or translucent third eyelid on the eyes of some animals
- Sissipahaw or Haw people, a former tribe of the Siouan speaking Nations in the American Southeast

== See also ==
- Haw. (disambiguation)
- Hawthorn (disambiguation)
- Lord Haw-Haw (William Joyce, 1906–1946), Nazi propaganda broadcaster to the United Kingdom during World War II
