= Mount Hermon Nature Reserve =

Nature reserve in the Rashaya District of Lebanon

Mount Hermon Nature Reserve is a nature reserve in the Rashaya District of Lebanon. It was established in 2020 by law no. 202. It occupies 12.6 square kilometres (4.9 sq mi).

Migratory and resident birds include:

- Syrian serin
- greater spotted eagle
- lesser spotted eagle
- imperial eagle
- steppe eagle
- eastern sparrowhawk
- goshawk
- black stork
- great white pelican
- whitethroat warbler
- rock bunting
- barn swallow
- black kite
- African collared dove
- turtledove
- thrush
- greenfinch
- goldfinch
- large scythebill warbler
- blue tit
- Eurasian jay

It is home to "over 100 medicinal plants", as well as:

- oak
- wild pear
- hawthorn
- wild almond
- bear plum
