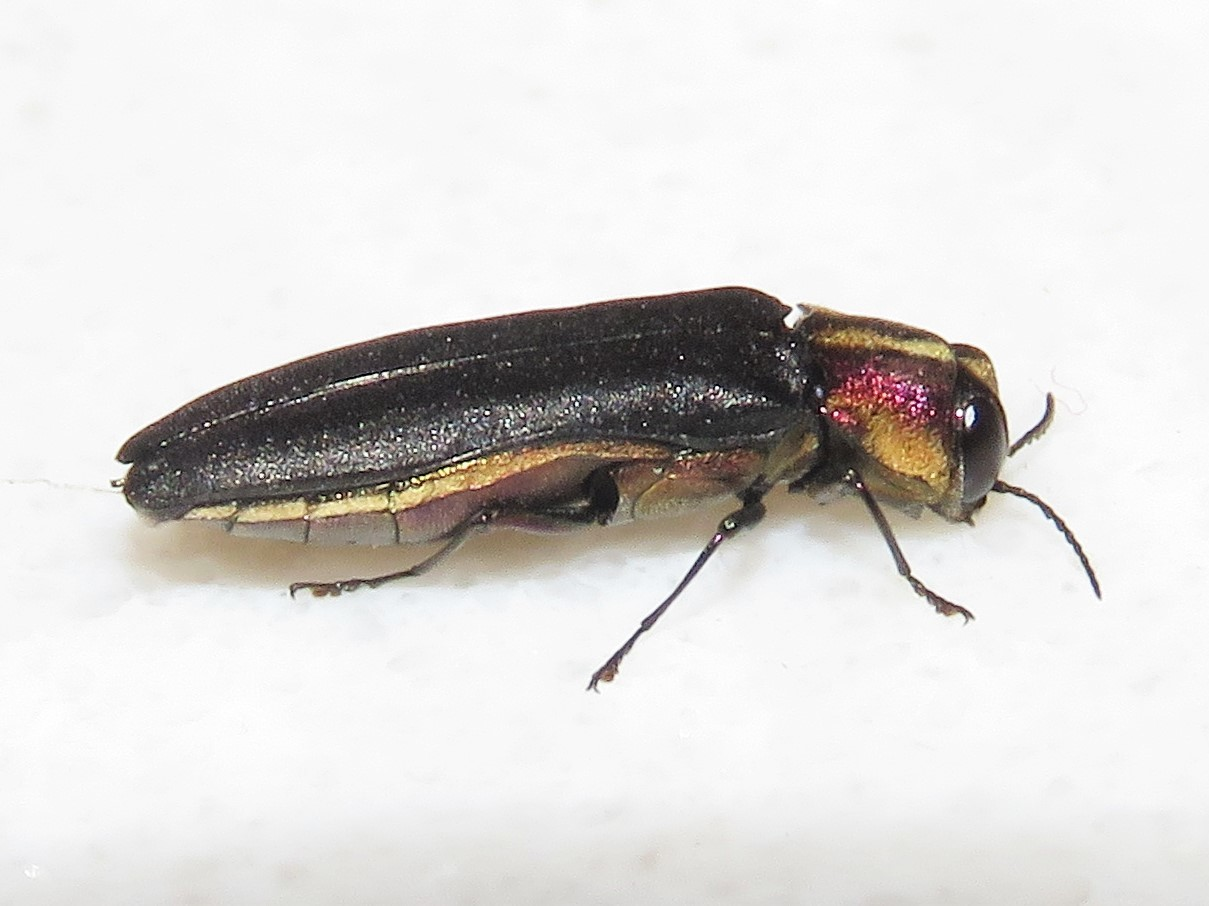
- Image taken in Ontario, Canada

Scientific classification
- Kingdom: Animalia
- Phylum: Arthropoda
- Clade: Pancrustacea
- Class: Insecta
- Order: Coleoptera
- Suborder: Polyphaga
- Infraorder: Elateriformia
- Family: Buprestidae
- Genus: Agrilus
- Species: A. vittaticollis

Binomial name
- Agrilus vittaticollis (Randall, 1838)

Synonyms
- Agrilus frenatus Gory, 1841

= Agrilus vittaticollis =

Species of beetle

Agrilus vittaticollis, also commonly known as the hawthorn root borer, is a species of metallic wood-boring beetle belonging to the family Buprestidae. It is found in North America. It is a root borer of Hawthorn.
