= Haw (surname) =

Haw is a surname, and may refer to:

- Brian Haw (1949–2011), protester in London's Parliament Square
- Charlton Haw (1920–1993), British fighter pilot
- Chris Haw (born 1981), American writer
- Jack Haw (1902–1975), Australian rules footballer
- Jesse Haw (born 1971), American businessman and politician
- Johannes Haw (1871–1949), German Roman Catholic priest
- Robbie Haw (born 1986), English footballer
- Stephen G. Haw (born 1951), English botanist
- Haw Tua Tau (1941–1982), Singaporean hawker and convicted murderer
