= Hawthorne House =

Hawthorne House may refer to:

in New Zealand

- Hawthorne House (Hawke's Bay, New Zealand), Edwardian Luxury Bed and Breakfast in Hawke's Bay, New Zealand

in the United States

- Hawthorne (Prairieville, Alabama)
- Hawthorne-Cowart House, Greenville, Alabama, listed on the National Register of Historic Places
- Hawthorne House (Pine Apple, Alabama), also known as Col. J.R. Hawthorne House
- Nathaniel Hawthorne Boyhood Home, South Casco, Maine
- Hawthorne Place, Natchez, Mississippi, listed on the National Register of Historic Places
- Rachel Louise Hawthorne House, Portland, Oregon
- Hawthorne Hall, Fincastle, Virginia

== See also ==
- Hawthorn House (disambiguation)
- Hawthorne (disambiguation)
- Hawthorne Historic District, Huntington, West Virginia, listed on the NRHP in Cabell County, West Virginia
