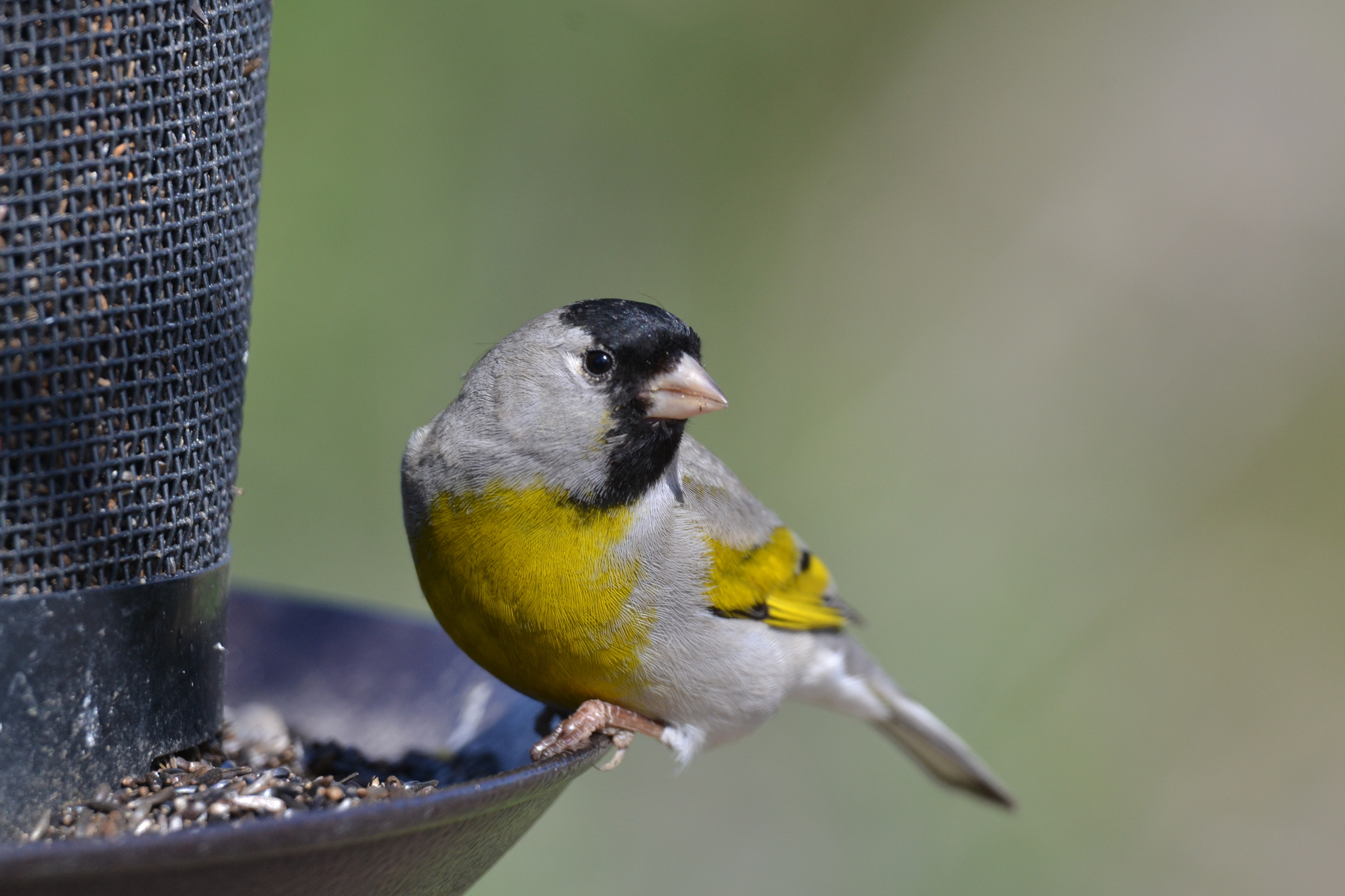
- Adult male

Conservation status
- Least Concern (IUCN 3.1)

Scientific classification
- Kingdom: Animalia
- Phylum: Chordata
- Class: Aves
- Order: Passeriformes
- Family: Fringillidae
- Subfamily: Carduelinae
- Genus: Spinus
- Species: S. lawrencei

Binomial name
- Spinus lawrencei (Cassin, 1850)
- Range of S. lawrencei Breeding range Year-round range Wintering range

Synonyms
- Carduelis lawrencei

= Lawrence's goldfinch =

Species of bird

Lawrence's goldfinch (Spinus lawrencei) is a small songbird of erratic distribution that breeds in California and Baja California and winters in the southwestern United States and northern Mexico.

== Description ==
At about 4.75 in (12.1 cm) long and weighing about 0.4 oz (11 g), it is slightly bigger than the lesser goldfinch and slightly smaller than the American goldfinch, with less yellow in the plumage than either. Adults of both sexes are gray with pink to grayish flesh-color bills, stubbier than other goldfinches'. They have yellow rumps and paired yellowish wing-bars, as well as yellow edges on the flight feathers and yellow on the breast. The tail is black, crossed by a white band. Plumage is duller in winter, brightening after a spring molt. Males are paler, with black caps and faces and larger areas of brighter yellow. Females are browner, have less and duller yellow, and lack the black. Juveniles resemble females but are even duller and have faint streaks on the upperparts and especially the underparts.

Calls include "a nasal too-err, also a sharp, high PIti and Itititi". The flight call, which is diagnostic, is given as "a high, clear ti-too" or tink-ul "reminiscent of glass wind-chimes". The song is high-pitched, continuous, and limited in frequency range, including wind-chime notes and especially imitations of other species' calls and other simple and distinctive sounds. Males sing in winter but mostly in the breeding season. Females sing occasionally and briefly.

== Range and habitat ==
Lawrence's goldfinch is known for its wandering habits. It breeds from about Shasta County, California to northern Baja California, largely in the Coast Ranges and the foothills of the Sierra Nevada and in the Baja highlands, but also sometimes as far down as the coast; its highest breeding altitude is about 8,800 ft (2,700 m) on Mount Pinos. There are only a few places where it has been observed to nest annually, notably the Carmel Valley and the South Fork Kern River. The choice of areas in its breeding range may depend on climate through the availability of water and preferred foods. Movements to the coast and upslope in the Sierras occur in drought years and movements to the edges of the range and into the Central Valley after wet years, possibly because of an increased food supply. It has been bred a few times in Arizona.

Most, but not always all, birds leave northern, central, and inland southern California in winter. They move into the coastal lowlands and into the lower parts of the southeastern California deserts, ranging irregularly (sometimes in large numbers) southeastward to northern Sonora and northwestern Chihuahua and eastward to the southern half of Arizona, southwestern New Mexico, and even the area of El Paso, Texas—roughly the Madrean Sky Islands region. In some winters mysteriously few birds are observed; possibly the birds are in Sonora and Chihuahua, which are poorly covered by naturalists. The greatest eastward irruptions often occur in wet periods and are synchronized with irruptions of other seedeating birds such as the red-breasted nuthatch, the red crossbill, and the other North American goldfinches.

The typical nesting habitat is dry and open woods that are near both brushy areas and fields of tall annual weeds, usually within 0.5 mi (0.80 km) of a small body of water. It may nest in other habitats, including rural residential areas, but not in deserts or dense forests. Outside the nesting season it occurs in many open habitats including deserts, suburbs, and city parks.

== Behavior ==
=== Diet ===
Lawrence's goldfinch feeds almost entirely on seeds of shrubs and forbs. During the nesting season, it eats seeds of annuals, strongly favoring the common fiddleneck. Birders seeking Lawrence's goldfinch are advised to know this plant. At other seasons in California, it predominantly eats chamise achenes and also berries of mistletoe (Phoradendron) and California Buckthorn. In Arizona, it often eats the seeds of amaranths and inkweed. It is attracted to niger seed at feeders.

=== Breeding ===
The nesting season is early spring to early summer, or sometimes as late as late July. As in other cardueline finches, pairs form in large pre-breeding flocks. Pairs leave the flocks and search for nest sites, the female taking the lead, often carrying nesting material and making building motions. The male follows, singing and calling. Nest sites may be in any of a number of trees, but early in the season they are often in mistletoe or western sycamore, while later they are in live oaks and especially the deciduous blue oak. ^{cited in}

Nests are usually single but sometimes in loose colonies that may contain over 10 pairs. The female builds the nest while the male follows her on long material-gathering forays or sings from a perch. It is a loosely woven cup in a fork of several small branches, placed about 10 ft (3.0 m) up near the edge of the tree. There are three to six eggs, unmarked white with a blue or green tinge.

The female incubates for 12 to 13 days and broods the chicks for four or five days, staying almost constantly on the nest; the male brings food. After the fourth day, the female joins the male in food-gathering trips but still broods at times through the seventh day. The chicks fledge at about 13 or 14 days, and after another 5 to 7 days leave the family to join a pre-migratory flock.

=== Flocking ===
During the breeding season, males join to form small flocks while females are on the nest. At other times, birds are found in flocks that typically comprise under 50 individuals but are occasionally over 500. Flocks may mix with other small seed-eating species.

== Taxonomy ==
This species is remarkably homogeneous with no subspecies and, according to one study, no genetic variation at the 23 loci tested. ^{cited in}

== Etymology ==
This bird's name commemorates the American ornithologist George Newbold Lawrence.

== Phylogeny and evolution ==
Within Spinus, this species forms a monophyletic clade with the American goldfinch and lesser goldfinch. Among the North American goldfinches, Lawrence's diverged first, meaning the other two species are more closely related to each other than either is to Lawrence's.
