= Haw. =

The abbreviation Haw. may refer to:

- Adrian Hardy Haworth (1767–1833), entomologist and biologist
- Hawaii, in legal citations
  - Supreme Court of Hawaii

== See also ==
- Haw (disambiguation)
