= USS Goldfinch =

USS Goldfinch may refer to the following ships operated by the United States Navy:

- USS Goldfinch (AM-77), a minesweeper built as the trawler Fordham in 1929
- USS Goldfinch (AMS-12), a wooden-hulled motor minesweeper, was commissioned 20 January 1944
- Goldfinch (AM-395), was authorized for construction on 16 May 1945 but her contract was canceled 1 November 1945
