= Hawthorn House, Menai Bridge =

Grade II listed building in Anglesey, UK

Coordinates: 53.2262°N 4.1613°W

Hawthorn House is a Grade II listed building located on the main street in the town of Menai Bridge, on the Isle of Anglesey.
