= Hawthorne Boulevard =

Hawthorne Boulevard may refer to

- Hawthorne Boulevard (California), located in Los Angeles County
- Hawthorne Boulevard (Portland, Oregon)
- "Hawthorne Boulevard" (song), an unreleased Beach Boys instrumental
