= Goldfinch (surname) =

Goldfinch is an English surname. Notable people with the surname include:

- Arthur Horne Goldfinch (1866–1945), British businessman and Liberal Party politician
- Duncan Goldfinch (1888–1960), South Australian painter
- Henry Goldfinch (1781–1854), officer in the Royal Engineers
- Murray Goldfinch (born 1984), Australian Paralympic athlete
- Philip Henry Macarthur Goldfinch (1884–1943), Australian politician
- Stephen Goldfinch (born 1982), American politician
