= Hawthorn House (Mobile, Alabama) =

Historic house in Alabama, United States

- U.S. National Register of Historic Places
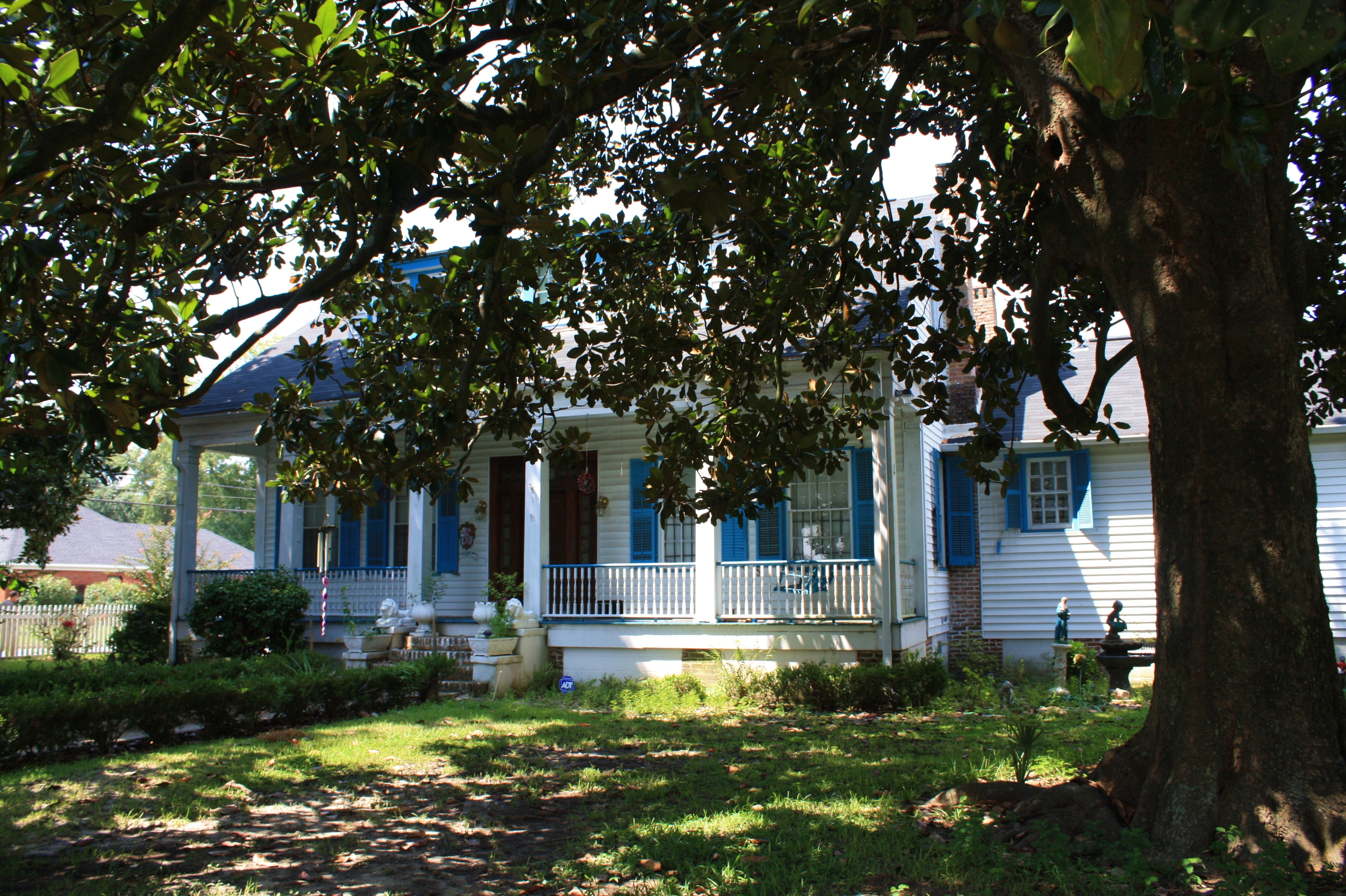

- Location within Mobile, Alabama Location within Alabama Location within the United States
- Location: 352 Stanton Road, Mobile, Alabama
- Coordinates: 30°41′59″N 88°5′18″W
- Built: 1853
- Architect: Joshua K. Hawthorn
- NRHP reference No.: 84000671
- Added to NRHP: May 21, 1984

The Hawthorn House was a historic house in Mobile, Alabama, United States. The 1 1/2-story wood-frame structure, on a brick foundation, was built in 1853 in the Gulf Coast Cottage style by Joshua K. Hawthorn. It was placed on the National Register of Historic Places on May 21, 1984, based on its architectural significance.
