= Anthony J. Motley =

- Born: Detroit, Michigan
- Occupations: Pastor, activist, educator
- Website: http://www.motley2010.com A. Motley Campaign Site for the City Council Position of Councilman At Large

Reverend Anthony J. Motley is an American religious and community leader from Southeast Washington, D.C.

He received his formal education in the District of Columbia Public Schools, graduating from the Anacostia High School. He served two tours of duty with US military. Motley earned a Master of Divinity from the Howard University School of Divinity, and a Bachelor of Arts in Communications from the University of Detroit.

In 2001 Reverend Motley worked to form what is now the J.O.B.S. Coalition of Greater Washington.
