= Regavim (NGO) =

Pro-settler Israeli NGO

Regavim (Hebrew: רגבים) is a pro-settler Israeli NGO that monitors and pursues legal action in the Israeli court system against any construction lacking Israeli permits undertaken by Palestinians or Bedouins in Israel and in the West Bank. It describes itself as "a public movement dedicated to the protection of Israel’s national lands and resources" and aims to "[restore] the Zionist vision to its primary role in the Israeli policy process".

It was founded in 2006 by Yehuda Eliahu and Bezalel Smotrich as "response to a Supreme Court case against the illegal outpost of Harasha in Samaria" initiated by Peace Now in 2005.

Regavim focuses most intensely on construction work in the Galilee, Negev, and the West Bank. Regavim's objectives converge with those of Israeli settlers, with whom the group maintains close institutional ties. Regavim is financed by public funds from West Bank local settlement councils and from the settler organization Amana.

Since 2026, Regavim has been sanctioned by the European Union and Canada for human rights abuses against Palestinians in the West Bank and ties to extremist settler violence.

== Origins and funding ==
According to Neve Gordon and Nocola Perugina, Regavim was founded as a settler-rights NGO. Perugini asserts that Regavim's objectives converge with those of Israeli settlers, with whom the group maintains close institutional ties. According to Gordon and Perugini, purpose was to counteract what its founders considered to be the improper use by "liberal" NGOs to "subvert" Israeli democracy by using the legal system to pursue advocacy of human rights when the left failed to achieve electoral success. According to Dror Etges, former Director of the Peace Now program, Settlement Watch, Regavim was not only conceived as a response to the work of anti-settlement NGOs, it was modeled directly on Settlement Watch and Yesh Din. This recourse to rights advocacy is dismissed as "undemocratic lawfare" by Neve Gordon. According to Neve Gordon and Nicola Perugini, settler rights NGOs like Regavim turn the relationship of oppressed and oppressor on its head, in transforming dispossession as a human right.

Regavim is financed by both private donations and public funds from West Bank local settlement councils. It received more than 2 million shekels ($550,000) of funding in 2010, a sixfold rise over 2008. Regavim also receives funds from the settler organization Amana. West Bank local settlement councils that have funded Regavim to the tune of millions of shekels include the Mateh Binyamin regional council, the Samara regional council, and the Hebron Hills regional council. Many settler members of Regavim have, under the direction of Bezalel Smotrich, been inducted as civil servants into Israeli Civil Administration overseeing the West Bank. Smotrich, who appointed the former Yitzhar settler Hillel Roth as the ICA's deputy direction in April 2024, has managed to have the IDF transfer many of its power over by-laws to these civil servants, a measure which according to Michael Sfard, will effectively move Israel towards a de facto annexation of that territory.

=== Name ===
The name, Regavim, lit. "patches of soil", is taken from the Hebrew word regev, meaning a very small piece of land, a word used in a Zionist poem about reclaiming the Land of Israel, "dunam by dunam, regev by regev". (A dunam is 0.1 hectare, about 0.247 acres.)

== Aims and activities ==
Regavim focuses most intensely on construction work in the Galilee, Negev, and the West Bank that has been done by Israeli Arabs and Palestinians without Israeli permits. Regavim has also directly petitioned against government removal of settler outposts. It has also petitioned successfully to stop Israeli demolition orders against settler homes, as in the case of Har Bracha in April 2010, and Migron. According to its director Ari Briggs, the courts and Civil Administration are often slow to act against "illegal Palestinian construction activity", and Regavim files lawsuits to prod the courts to issue demolition orders. After Yesh Din successfully petitioned the state to force settlers in the illegal Israeli outpost of El Matan to seal an unauthorized synagogue, Regavim retaliated by petitioning the Israeli Supreme Court to have a mosque, still under construction and serving 400 worshippers in Al Mufaqara, bulldozed in the West Bank on the grounds it was in Area C. Their suit was successful.

Regavim argues that the Jewish people are "being robbed of the Land of Israel ... ever so quietly without the roar of battle and the clamor of war" Regavim appears to mirror the practices of human rights organizations like Yesh Din, which appeal to the courts on behalf on Palestinian communities, with the difference that for Regavim, all of Israel and the Palestinian territories is "national land" and Palestinian habitation is an "illegal overtaking" of that land, it systematically inverts the terms of human rights language, by designating Jewish settlements as legal, and Palestinians under the Israeli occupation as "trespassers" engaged in illegal occupation, settlement, and outpost construction. By using a network of settlers to scout, photograph and report on Palestinian construction, it monitors and then reports on constructions by Palestinians that lack full Israeli legal permits, and prosecutes cases of such construction through the judicial system.

Peter Beaumont cites its aim as one of preventing "foreign elements from taking over the countries [sic] territorial resources", pursuing cases in areas beyond Israel into territory occupied by Israel in 1967.

In September 2011, Regavim submitted a petition to the ICC urging it to revoke the decision to receive the Palestinian Authority's declaration of recognizing the International Criminal Court's jurisdiction, which was a gentle attempt by PA for statehood recognition. In April 2012 the ICC prosecutor turned down the request by the PA for a probe into accusations of Israeli war crimes in Gaza War (2008–09), stating that it had no jurisdiction over unrecognized states.

=== Protecting nature preserves ===
Regavim monitors and reports on the violation of nature reserves for construction, roads and other development at Mount Meron and elsewhere. According to Rabbis for Human Rights some of these nature reserves in the Negev are declared in order to block Bedouins from using the land, and precedents exist for transforming reserves to future Jewish construction. Regavim, however, calls the Bedouin settlements, "a silent conquest", of land by means of illegal construction funded from abroad.

The organization sued the Druze town of Majdal Shams for illegal construction inside the Mount Hermon Nature Reserve.

=== Reactions ===
Nearly 90 US lawmakers sent a letter to Joe Biden in late October 2024 urging him to sanction the NGO Regavim, saying it was involved in actions that led to the forced displacement of Palestinians from their lands in the West Bank.

== Accusations against the European Union in illegal construction ==
In February 2015 Regavim released a report documenting the construction of houses funded by the British charity Oxfam and the European Union. The same material claimed that the European Union was subsidizing illegal housing in Area C of the West Bank, which according to Oslo Accords is under interim Israeli jurisdiction. Israeli international law expert Alan Baker, who took part in the Oslo Accords' creation, said that "EU is ignoring international law and taking concrete steps to influence the facts on the ground". Similar opinions were expressed by Eugene Kontorovich and by MEPs as James Carver (Britain) and Michael Theurer (Germany).

- "Professor Eugene Kontorovich, an international lawyer from the Northwestern University School of Law in Chicago, said, "There's no question, the EU is openly in violation of international law."
- "James Carver, a British ME, wrote a strongly-worded letter to the European Parliament's Committee on Foreign Affairs. 'The structures all bear the name and flag of the EU and official EU agents have been photographed participating in overseeing the construction, so the active involvement of the EU can hardly be denied,' ... 'I kindly call upon you to do your utmost to bring an end to these illegal and destructive activities'"
- "Michael Theurer, a German MEP who is a member of the European Parliament's Committee on Economic and Monetary Affairs, shares his concerns. 'I am taking these allegations seriously and will thoroughly investigate them'"

As a result of report's publication, "Prime Minister Benjamin Netanyahu instructed Defense Minister Moshe Ya'alon to move forward with a plan to demolish some 400 Palestinian structures built in the West Bank with European funding." The first such building was demolished in March 2015 on Mt. Scopus near Hebrew University

== Bedouins ==
Regavim files law suits to block illegal Bedouin construction in the Negev and elsewhere.

Regavim calls the Bedouin settlements "a silent conquest" of land by means of illegal construction funded from abroad. Regavim claims the Bedouin tribes of the Negev fail the definition of indigenous peoples since, according to Regavim:

1. They aren't the "Original Peoples" of the region.
2. They have no long-standing presence as Ottoman records from late 16th century doesn't mention the current Negev tribes.
3. They never had sovereignty over the area.
4. The demand for land ownership that allows for selling it is contrary to a spiritual connection to the territory.

The UN recognition of the Negev Bedouins is regarded by Regavim as questionable since no other Bedouin tribes in the Middle East made the indigenousness claim. As a result, members of the same tribe may or may not be considered indigenous depending on which side of the border they live. Moreover, many Bedouin families are recent immigrants to the Negev.

Regavim argues that the Palestinian Bedouin are trying to take over the area. Their argument is based on Israeli definitions of what are "residential areas", of which the Bedouin, though constituting 30% of the Negev population, claim only 21% in agricultural areas, or a total of 5.4% of the Negev. The contemporary Bedouin claims in the Negev are, according to Rabbis for Human Rights, much less than what the Zionist "Israel Land Development Company" determined to be under Bedouin ownership in 1920. Regavim contests in courts Bedouin ownership of land, though Zionists prior to the establishment of the state of Israel recognized both their indigenous status and their land ownership system. To prove historic Bedouin villages did not exist, Regavim uses aerial photographs from 1945 that Regavim says do not reveal the presence of such villages, ignoring, according to Rabbis for Human Rights, the fact that Bedouins used mud hunts or tents whose colour blended with that of the landscape, and, they argue, not visible on low resolution black-and-white aerial photographs. Furthermore, according to Rabbis for Human Rights, the Regavim evidence ignores British maps that demonstrate the villages' existence.

== Criticism and sanctions ==
Critics claim that Regavim's objectives converge with those of Israeli settlers, with whom the group maintains close institutional ties. Also alleging that Regavim aims to "try to force the state to speed up and increase the execution of home demolition orders and forced relocations of non-Jews, be they of Palestinians in the West Bank or Bedouin in the Negev".

Neve Gordon describes Regavim as a "settler-colonial NGO" and denounces its "strategy of mirroring" in picturing Palestinian villages as "outposts" or Palestinian presence in the West Bank as a "kind of illegal occupation". Critics argue that Regavim aims to "try to force the state to speed up and increase the execution of home demolition orders and forced relocations of non-Jews, be they of Palestinians in the West Bank or Bedouin in the Negev".

According to Nicola Perugini and others, the word "land" here refers to "Jewish national land", and by that term Regavim understands the entirety of Israel and the Palestinian territories it occupies, in which Palestinian habitation is considered an illegal takeover.

On May 28, 2026 the European Union announced it was sanctioning Regavim and its director Meir Deutsch for their involvement in systematic human rights abuses against West Bank Palestinians. The organization cited Regavim's role in the demolition of Palestinian property, including a EU-funded primary school in the Palestinian village of Jubbet ad-Dib. On June 9, 2026 Canada also announced sanctions against Regavim, for "directly or indirectly facilitating, supporting, providing funding for or contributing to the use of violence by Israeli extremist settlers against Palestinian civilians or their property". Both sets of sanctions include asset freezes, travel bans, and restrictions on financing. Regavim has vowed a legal challenge against both measures, describing them as an "attack on the state of Israel". The Israeli government also condemned the sanctions.

== Buildings on private Palestinian land ==
In May 2015, Regavim provided a study to Knesset members, who are working towards legislation to expropriate private land from Palestinians in return for compensation. According to it, 2,026 structures are built on private Palestinian land in 26 settlements in the West Bank. When the details from its own study were revealed, Regavim replied in a public statement that

It is irresponsible to publish data that appears in the report; any discussion on this sensitive issue should be conducted with appropriate discretion in the proper forum. Regavim has presented its stance on this issue to the officials relevant in finding a solution for the complex situation that has arisen in these places.
