= Robbie Haw =

English footballer (born 1986)

Personal information
- Full name: Robert Andrew Haw
- Date of birth: 10 October 1986 (age 40)
- Place of birth: York, England
- Position: Striker

Team information
- Current team: Mill Lane United

Youth career
- ?–2004: York City

Senior career*
Years	Team	Apps	(Gls)
2004–2006	York City	3	(0)
2010–	Mill Lane United	?	(?)
- * Club domestic league appearances and goals as of 15:01, 9 June 2010 (UTC)

Robert Andrew Haw (born 10 October 1986) is an English footballer who plays for Mill Lane United as a striker. He played for York City from 2004 to 2006 after progressing through the youth system.

== Career ==
Born in York, Haw grew up in Beverley and played in the York City youth system as a schoolboy and signed a three-year trainee scholarship in July 2003. He made his debut for the reserve team towards the end of the 2002–03 season. His first team debut came at the age of 17 as a 59th minute substitute in a 0–0 draw at Swansea City on 8 May 2004, which was York's last game in the Football League before relegation to the Football Conference. His first appearance of the 2004–05 season came as an 80th-minute substitute in a 0–0 draw at Canvey Island on 16 October, with manager Chris Brass saying "Young Robbie Haw did exceptionally well though. He's been training with the first team and deserved his chance." He made two appearances for York in the 2004–05 season. He failed to make any first team appearances during the 2005–06 season, instead spending the final year of his trainee scholarship playing in the youth team.

He signed for East Riding County League Division One team Mill Lane United in February 2010.

== Career statistics ==
Appearances and goals by club, season and competition
Club	Season	League^{[A]}		FA Cup		League Cup		Other		Total	
Club	Season	Apps	Goals	Apps	Goals	Apps	Goals	Apps	Goals	Apps	Goals
York City	2003–04	1	0	0	0	0	0	0	0	1	0
York City	2004–05	2	0	0	0	0	0	0	0	2	0
York City	2005–06	0	0	0	0	0	0	0	0	0	0
York City	Total	3	0	0	0	0	0	0	0	3	0
Career totals		3	0	0	0	0	0	0	0	3	0

== Footnotes ==
A. The "League" column constitutes appearances and goals (including those as a substitute) in the Football League and Football Conference.
