= Nathaniel Hawthorne Boyhood Home =

Historic house in Maine, United States

- U.S. National Register of Historic Places
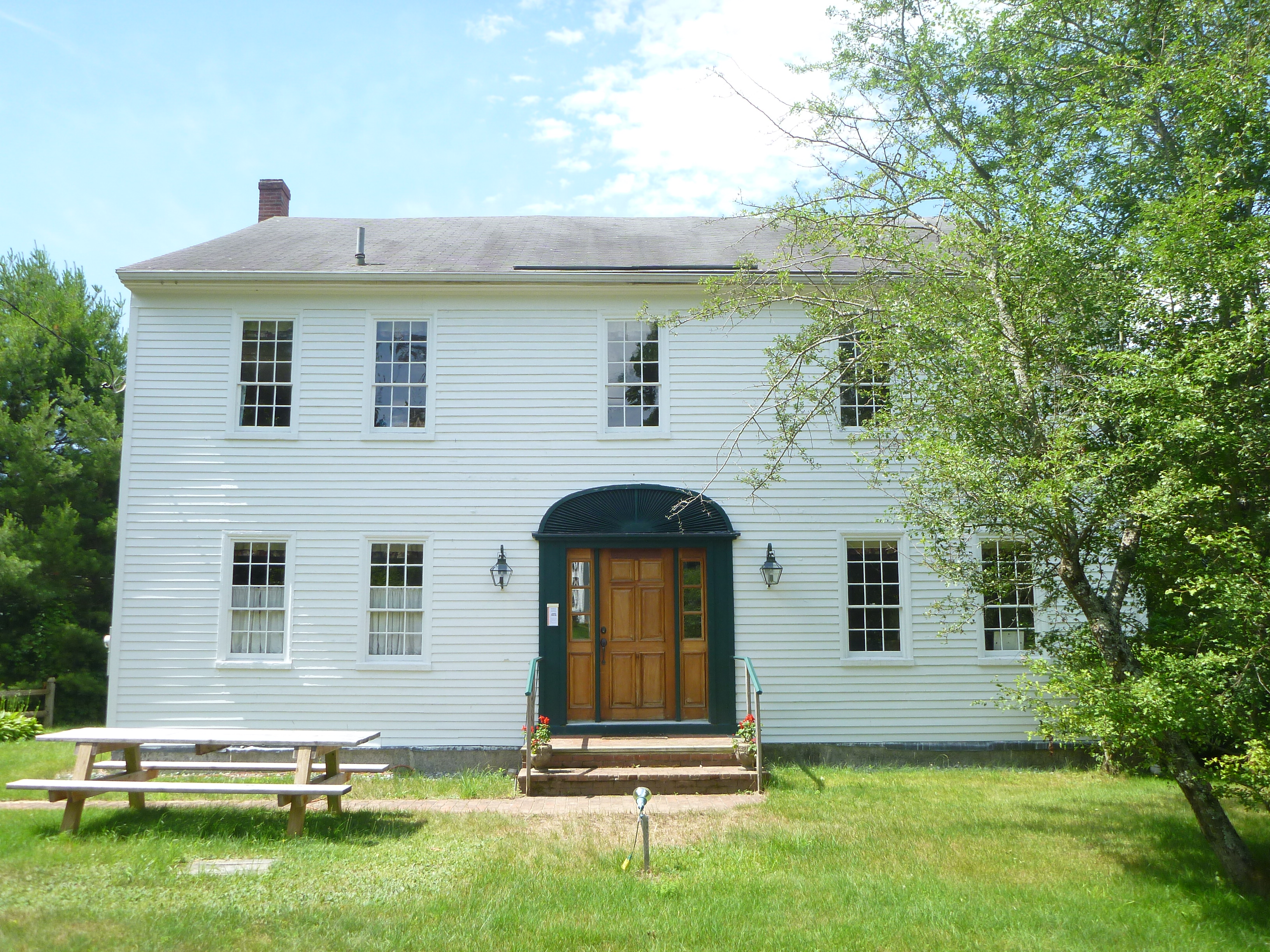

- Location within Maine Location within the United States
- Location: Hawthorne and Raymond Cape Rds., Raymond, Maine
- Coordinates: 43°54′22″N 70°30′47″W
- Area: less than one acre
- Built: 1818
- NRHP reference No.: 69000030
- Added to NRHP: December 2, 1969

The Nathaniel Hawthorne Boyhood Home is a historic house at Raymond Cape Road and Hawthorne Road in Raymond, Maine. Built about 1812, the house was the childhood home of author Nathaniel Hawthorne. Its interior, now much altered, serves as a function space for a community organization dedicated to its preservation. It was listed on the National Register of Historic Places in 1969.

== Description ==
The Hawthorne Boyhood Home is located in northern Raymond, near the border with Casco to the north, at the southeast corner of Hawthorne Road and Raymond Cape Road. It is a rectangular 2 1/2-story wood-frame structure, with a side gable roof, brick end chimneys, and clapboard siding. Its main façade faces north toward Hawthorne Road, and is five bays wide, with an elaborate center entrance that has flanking sidelight windows and pilasters, and is topped by a wide Federal-period fan. Its windows and corners are otherwise trimmed modestly. The interior is reflective of the building's later 19th-century uses as a dance school, tavern, and church, and consists of three large rooms.

== History ==
The house was built about 1812 by Dr. Richard Manning, who was an uncle to Nathaniel Hawthorne. Hawthorne is known to have lived for some years with his uncle in this house, and probably continued to visit it during his years at Bowdoin College (1822–25). The house was known in its early years as "Manning's Folly", because of Manning's extravagant wallpaper, large fireplaces, and expensive Belgian glass windows. Manning eventually moved back to Salem, Massachusetts, and the house was converted into a tavern. Manning left a bequest to the town for the construction of a church in South Casco, which was used, instead of building a new church, to convert his old house into one in 1839. The house has been owned by the Hawthorne Community Association, a local group dedicated to the building's preservation.

== See also ==
- National Register of Historic Places listings in Cumberland County, Maine
