= USS Goldfinch (AMS-12) =

Minesweeper of the United States Navy

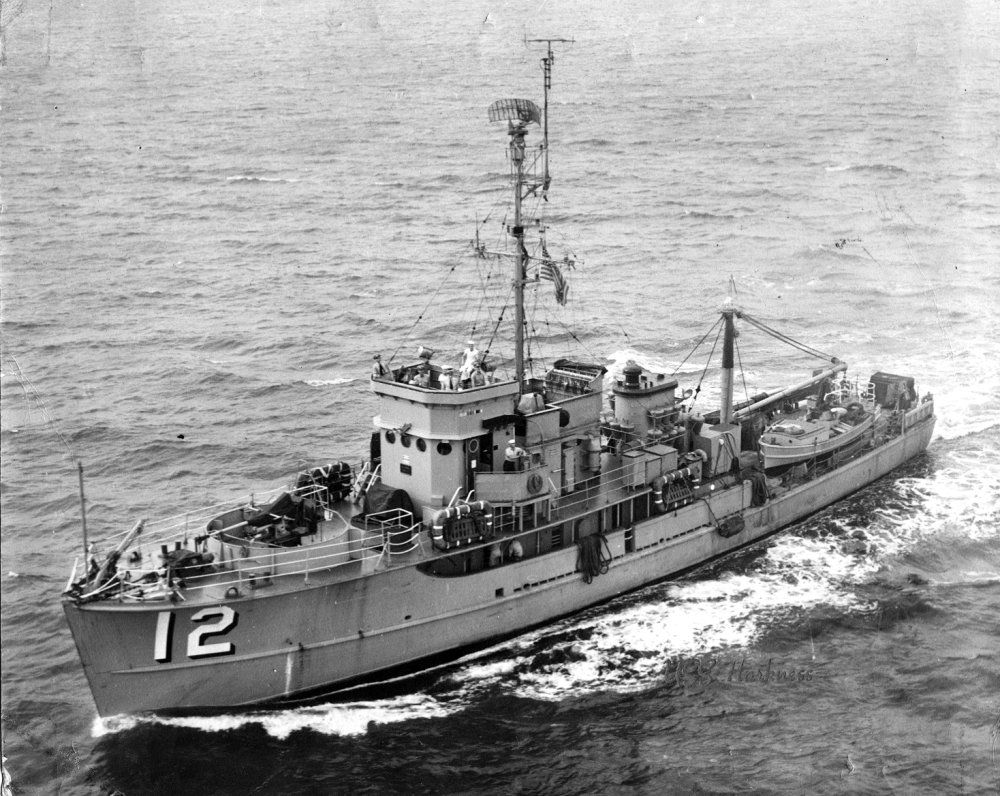
- A YMS-1-class minesweeper

History

United States
- Ordered: as YMS-306
- Laid down: date unknown
- Launched: date unknown
- Commissioned: 20 January 1944
- Decommissioned: 11 October 1957
- Stricken: 1 November 1957
- Fate: Sold, 2 June 1960, to the Maine Vocational Technical Institute

General characteristics
- Displacement: 270 tons
- Length: 136 ft (41 m)
- Beam: 24 ft 6 in (7.47 m)
- Draught: 8 ft (2.4 m)
- Speed: 13 knots
- Complement: 50
- Armament: one 3 in (76 mm) gun mount

USS Goldfinch (AMS-12/YMS-306) was a YMS-1-class minesweeper of the YMS-135 subclass acquired by the U.S. Navy for the dangerous task of removing mines from minefields laid in the water to prevent ships from passing.

Goldfinch, a wooden-hulled motor minesweeper, was built as YMS-306 by Rice Brothers Corp., East Boothbay, Maine, and commissioned 20 January 1944.

== Operational history ==
YMS-306 departed Boston, Massachusetts, 6 February for shakedown training off Norfolk, Virginia, and upon completion reported to Bermuda for minesweeping duty, arriving 16 April 1944.

Returning to Norfolk, the ship prepared for Pacific Ocean duty and departed for California 18 July 1945. She arrived San Pedro, California, via the Panama Canal 14 August, and after undergoing extensive repairs departed for Pearl Harbor, arriving 2 January 1946.

The minesweeper returned to the United States a month later, 5 February, and sailed 7 April for the U.S. East Coast via the Panama Canal. She arrived Charleston, South Carolina, harbor 1 May 1946, and began a regular schedule of training and readiness operations with Mine Force, Atlantic Fleet. Her operations during the next years took her from Charleston to Panama City, Florida, and Key West, Florida, and occasionally as far north as Argentia, Newfoundland. She participated in both individual and fleet training exercises, including amphibious operations in the Caribbean in February 1950 and off Onslow Bay, North Carolina, November 1954.

She was named Goldfinch (AMS-12) 17 February 1947. Her designation was changed to MSO(O)-12, 7 February 1955. The ship continued her schedule of sweeping operations until 15 July 1957 when she sailed from Charleston to Philadelphia, Pennsylvania.

Arriving 18 July, she decommissioned 11 October 1957 and was placed in the Philadelphia Group, Atlantic Reserve Fleet until struck from the Navy List 1 November 1957 and sold 2 June 1960 to the Maine Vocational Technical Institute.

Sold in 1961 to the Southern Maine Vocational Technical Institute of South Portland, ME for use as a fishing vessel.

Acquired in 1973 by Aqualab Off-Shore-Fisheries of South Portland and renamed AQUALAB.

Advertised for sale in 1977 as a vessel needing salvage after spending an unknown period of time at a pier in Fort Washington, MD and then being relocated to Piscataway Creek, Fort Washington, across the Potomac River from Mount Vernon, VA where she sank to deck level.

Purchased and salvaged in January 1978 by Captain Robert A. Bott of Bott Marine International (BMI) and renamed Maida Lee for use as a base of operations for BMI in Key West, FL.

Sunk as part of the Key West Gulfside artificial reef system April 1985.
