= The Hawthorns (house) =

Heritage-listed house in Melbourne, Victoria, Australia

- Location of the house in Greater Metropolitan Melbourne

General information
- Status: Completed
- Type: House
- Architectural style: Old Colonial Gothic Picturesque
- Location: 5 Creswick Street, Hawthorn, City of Boroondara, Melbourne, Victoria, Australia
- Coordinates: 37°48′56″S 145°01′02″E
- Completed: 1852; 174 years ago

Technical details
- Material: Bluestone; slate; timber; cast iron

Design and construction
- Architect: John Gill

Victorian Heritage Register
- Official name: The Hawthorns
- Type: Registered place
- Delisted: 3 October 1979
- Reference no.: VHR H0457
- Heritage overlay no.: HO39
- Category: Residential buildings (private)

Register of the National Estate
- Official name: The Hawthorns
- Type: Defunct register
- Designated: 21 March 1978
- Reference no.: 5657

The Hawthorns is a house located at 5 Creswick Street in Hawthorn, in the City of Boroondara, in the inner eastern suburbs of Melbourne, in Victoria, Australia.

Built in 1852 on the traditional lands of the Wurundjeri people, the house was added to the Victorian Heritage Register on 3 October 1979 in recognition of its historical and architectural significance; and was also added to non-statutory lists by the Victorian branch of the National Trust on 24 March 1960 and the now defunct Register of the National Estate on 21 March 1978.

== History ==
The Hawthorns, initially known as The Falls, was built in c. 1845 for James Denham Pinnock, a judge, designed by John Gill. In 1852 the property was subdivided and the house was purchased by Henry Creswick, MLA for Emerald Hill in 1863, who renamed it The Hawthorns.

== Description ==
The Hawthorns is an early house in the rarely-used Old Colonial Gothic Picturesque style, of architectural importance and has an important townscape relationship to nearby Invergowrie, which is by the same unknown hand.

The asymmetrically composed, two storey house, with castellated walled courtyard and stables, is constructed of random coursed bluestone with slate roofs. Elaborate timber bargeboards and finials decorate the gables and the prominent chimneys are part bluestone, part rendered. The oriel, arched entrance and window surrounds are distinctive. It is a good example of its style, the house is conventionally planned and notable for its detailing.

Built using blackwood and boxwood in the roof frame, cast iron spouting and lead flashings, the house has been enclosed by suburbia and altered over the years and at one stage was converted into flats. The original bay window and verandah were unsympathetically replaced and some finials were decayed or missing.

== See also ==
- Architecture of Melbourne
- List of places on the Victorian Heritage Register in the City of Boroondara
