= Hawthorn =

Hawthorn or Hawthorns may refer to:

== Plants ==
- Crataegus (hawthorn), a large genus of shrubs and trees in the family Rosaceae
- Rhaphiolepis (hawthorn), a genus of about 15 species of evergreen shrubs and small trees in the family Rosaceae
- Hawthorn maple, Acer crataegifolium, a tree variously classified in families Sapindaceae or Aceraceae
- Crataegus monogyna the common hawthorn, the species after which the above are named

== Places ==
- Hawthorn, Pennsylvania, a city in the United States
- Hawthorn, Victoria, a suburb of Melbourne, Australia
  - Hawthorn railway station, Melbourne in the above suburb
  - Electoral district of Hawthorn, a Victorian Legislative Assembly seat based on and named after the above suburb
  - The Hawthorns (house), a heritage-listed house in the above suburb
- Hawthorn, South Australia, a suburb of Adelaide, Australia
  - Hawthorn railway station, Adelaide, which was formerly in operation in the above suburb
- Mount Hawthorn, Western Australia, a suburb of Perth, Australia
- Hawthorn, County Durham, a village in County Durham, in England
- Hawthorn, Wiltshire, a locality of Corsham, Wiltshire, England
- Hawthorn, Hampshire, a village in Hampshire, in England
- Hawthorns, Staffordshire, a village in Staffordshire, in England
- Hawthorn (Rhondda Cynon Taf), a village in Rhondda Cynon Taf, in Wales

== Other ==
- Hawthorn Leslie and Company, a British shipbuilder usually referred to as "Hawthorn" and located in Newcastle upon Tyne
- Mike Hawthorn, English racing driver, 1958 F-1 World Champion
- Hawthorn Football Club, the Hawthorn Hawks are an Australian rules football club
- Hawthorn Suites, a hotel chain in the United States
- Hawthorn Hall, a former house in Hall Road, Wilmslow, Cheshire

== See also ==
- Hawthorne (disambiguation)
- The Hawthorns (disambiguation)
- Haw (disambiguation)
