= Hawthorne (Washington, D.C.) =

Neighborhood of Washington, D.C.

Coordinates: 38.98°N 77.0547°W

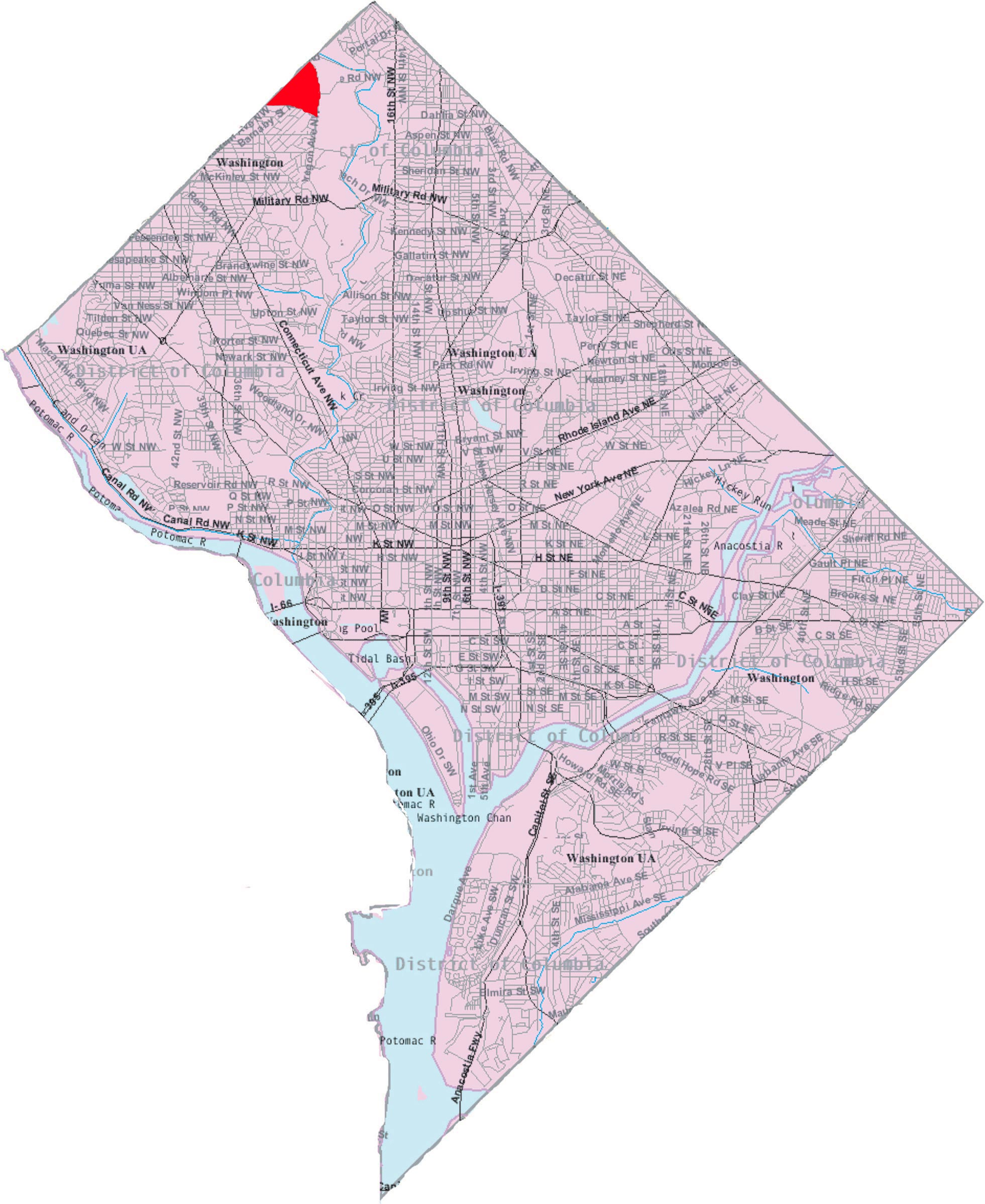
Map of Washington, D.C., with Hawthorne highlighted in red

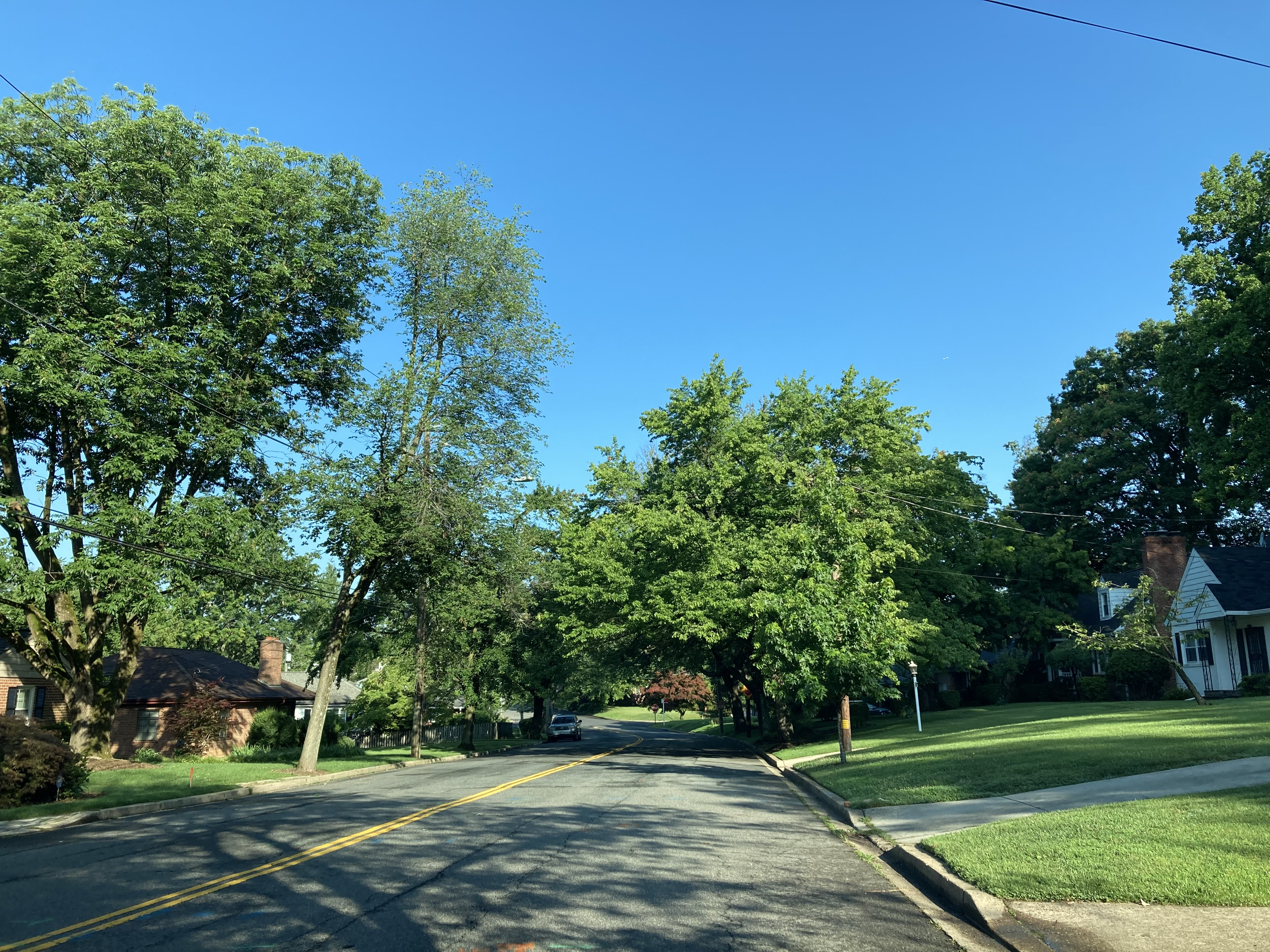
Near the intersection of 32nd St. and Chestnut St. NW, in Hawthorne, in July 2021.

Hawthorne is a neighborhood of 308 single family homes in the Northwest quadrant of Washington, D.C. According to neighborhood lore, the subdivision was named for the hawthorn trees once abundant in the area. The neighborhood borders Montgomery County, Maryland, and is bounded by Pinehurst Parkway Park NW, Western Avenue NW, and Oregon Avenue NW,

This neighborhood was originally inhabited by wealthy African Americans, mostly doctors, lawyers, and professors. Most of these families were alumni and faculty of Howard University from 1969 to about 2005. Hawthorne is entirely residential, with no commercial zoning, and is occupied by 1940s-era large split-level and rambler houses on very large parcels. The neighborhood is suburban, separated from the roar of life in the nation's capital.

The area is part of the Chevy Chase Citizens Association and residents consider themselves residents of Chevy Chase. The neighborhood is known for its abundance of mature trees and green space. Most of the neighborhood's housing stock was built in the 1940s. Ranch-style and split-level homes predominate, although there are some Colonial, Cape Cod, and modern-style homes.

Hawthorne students are zoned to Lafayette Elementary School, Alice Deal Middle School, and Jackson-Reed High School.
