= Electoral history of Eleanor Holmes Norton =

Electoral history of American politician

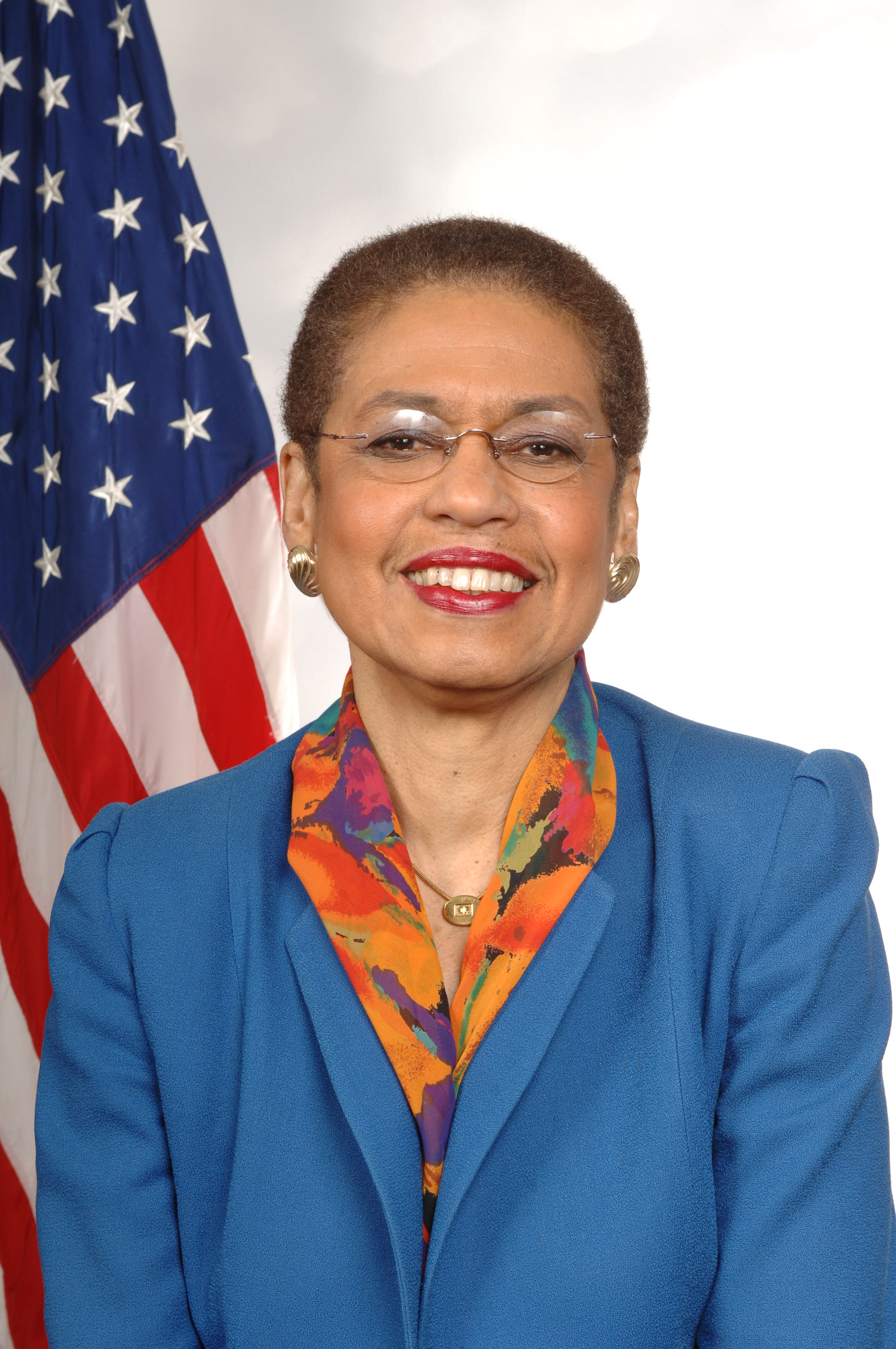
Norton during the 109th United States Congress

Eleanor Holmes Norton is an American lawyer and politician currently serving in the U.S. House of Representatives as the non-voting delegate from the District of Columbia since January 3, 1991. Norton is a member of the Democratic Party. Before her tenure in Congress, Norton served as the chair of the Equal Employment Opportunity Commission from 1977 to 1981. She was appointed by President Jimmy Carter, becoming the first woman to hold the position. During her tenure in Congress, she has been a major proponent for the District of Columbia to become a state, with Norton proposing a statehood bill in the House several times. While a statehood bill has passed the House, the Senate has never passed the bill.

== D.C. Congressional Delegate ==
=== 1990s ===
1990 District of Columbia's at-large congressional district delegate election
Primary election
Party	Candidate	Votes	%
Democratic	Eleanor Holmes Norton	48,352	39.48%
Democratic	Betty Ann Kane	40,695	33.23%
Democratic	Sterling Tucker	12,882	10.52%
Democratic	Joseph P. Yeldell	8,379	6.84%
Democratic	Donald M. Temple	7,717	6.30%
Democratic	Barbara Lett-Simmons	2,233	1.82%
Democratic	George X. Cure	1,425	1.16%
Write-in		786	0.64%
Total votes		122,469	100.00%
General election
Democratic	Eleanor Holmes Norton	98,442	61.67%
Republican	Harry Singleton	41,999	26.31%
Independent	George X. Cure	8,156	5.11%
DC Statehood	Leon Frederick Hunt	4,027	2.52%
Independent	David H. Dabney	3,334	2.09%
Write-in		3,669	2.30%
Total votes		159,627	100.00%
Democratic hold			

1992 District of Columbia's at-large congressional district delegate election
Party	Candidate	Votes	%
Democratic	Eleanor Holmes Norton (incumbent)	166,408	84.78%
Republican	Susan Emerson	20,108	10.22%
DC Statehood	Susan Griffin	7,253	3.69%
Socialist Workers	Sam Manuel	1,840	0.94%
Write-in		745	0.38%
Total votes		196,354	100.00%
Democratic hold			

1994 District of Columbia's at-large congressional district delegate election
Primary election
Party	Candidate	Votes	%
Democratic	Eleanor Holmes Norton (incumbent)	113,428	98.80%
Write-in		1,863	1.20%
Total votes		115,291	100.00%
General election
Democratic	Eleanor Holmes Norton (incumbent)	154,988	89.25%
Republican	Donald A. Saltz	13,828	7.96%
DC Statehood	Rasco P. Braswell	2,824	1.63%
Socialist Workers	Bradley Downs	1,476	0.85%
Write-in		548	0.32%
Total votes		173,664	100.00%
Democratic hold			

1996 District of Columbia's at-large congressional district delegate election
Primary election
Party	Candidate	Votes	%
Democratic	Eleanor Holmes Norton (incumbent)	20,445	98.66%
Write-in		278	1.34%
Total votes		20,723	100.00%
General election
Democratic	Eleanor Holmes Norton (incumbent)	134,996	90.00%
Republican	Sprague Simons	11,306	7.54%
Independent	Faith	2,119	1.41%
Socialist Workers	Sam Manuel	1,146	0.76%
Write-in		431	0.29%
Total votes		149,998	100.00%
Democratic hold			

1998 District of Columbia's at-large congressional district delegate election
Primary election
Party	Candidate	Votes	%
Democratic	Eleanor Holmes Norton (incumbent)	71,048	98.44%
Write-in		1,123	1.56%
Total votes		72,171	100.00%
General election
Democratic	Eleanor Holmes Norton (incumbent)	122,228	89.64%
Republican	Henry Edwards Wolterbeek	8,610	6.31%
DC Statehood	Pat Kidd	2,323	1.70%
Independent	Natale Nicola Stracuzzi	1,647	1.21%
Socialist Workers	Mary Martin	1,087	0.80%
Write-in		464	0.34%
Total votes		136,359	100.00%
Democratic hold			

=== 2000s ===
2000 District of Columbia's at-large congressional district delegate election
Primary election
Party	Candidate	Votes	%
Democratic	Eleanor Holmes Norton (incumbent)	19,372	97.14%
Write-in		570	2.86%
Total votes		19,942	100.00%
General election
Democratic	Eleanor Holmes Norton (incumbent)	158,824	90.43%
Republican	Henry Edwards Wolterbeek	10,258	5.84%
Libertarian	Robert D. Kampia	4,594	2.62%
Socialist Workers	Sam Manuel	1,419	0.81%
Write-in		536	0.31%
Total votes		175,631	100.00%
Democratic hold			

2002 District of Columbia's at-large congressional district delegate election
Primary election
Party	Candidate	Votes	%
Democratic	Eleanor Holmes Norton (incumbent)	90,307	98.27%
Write-in		1,590	1.73%
Total votes		91,897	100.00%
Democratic	Eleanor Holmes Norton (incumbent)	119,268	93.01%
Independent	Pat Kidd	7,733	6.03%
Write-in		1,232	0.96%
Total votes		128,233	100.00%
Democratic hold			

2004 District of Columbia's at-large congressional district delegate election
Primary election
Party	Candidate	Votes	%
Democratic	Eleanor Holmes Norton (incumbent)	58,363	98.35%
Write-in		979	1.65%
Total votes		59,342	100.00%
General election
Democratic	Eleanor Holmes Norton (incumbent)	202,027	91.33%
Republican	Michael Andrew Monroe	18,926	8.27%
Write-in		890	0.40%
Total votes		221,843	100.00%
Democratic hold			

2006 District of Columbia's at-large congressional district delegate election
Primary election
Party	Candidate	Votes	%
Democratic	Eleanor Holmes Norton (incumbent)	95,419	92.83%
Democratic	Andy Miscuk	6,681	6.50%
Write-in		687	0.67%
Total votes		102,787	100.00%
General election
Democratic	Eleanor Holmes Norton (incumbent)	111,726	97.34%
Write-in		3,051	2.66%
Total votes		114,777	100.00%
Democratic hold			

2008 District of Columbia's at-large congressional district delegate election
Primary election
Party	Candidate	Votes	%
Democratic	Eleanor Holmes Norton (incumbent)	38,999	98.28%
Write-in		682	1.72%
Total votes		39,681	100.00%
General election
Democratic	Eleanor Holmes Norton (incumbent)	228,376	92.28%
DC Statehood	Maude Louise Hills	16,693	6.75%
Write-in		2,402	0.97%
Total votes		247,471	100.00%
Democratic hold			

=== 2010s ===
2010 District of Columbia's at-large congressional district delegate election
Primary election
Party	Candidate	Votes	%
Democratic	Eleanor Holmes Norton (incumbent)	116,277	90.18%
Democratic	Douglass Ned Sloan	11,857	9.20%
Write-in		798	0.62%
Total votes		128,932	100.00%
General election
Democratic	Eleanor Holmes Norton (incumbent)	117,990	88.94%
Republican	Missy Reilly Smith	8,109	6.11%
DC Statehood	Rick Tingling-Clemmons	4,413	3.33%
Independent	Queen Noble	785	0.59%
Write-in		1,359	1.02%
Total votes		132,656	100.00%
Democratic hold			

2012 District of Columbia's at-large congressional district delegate election
Primary election
Party	Candidate	Votes	%
Democratic	Eleanor Holmes Norton (incumbent)	52,881	97.29%
Write-in		1,474	2.71%
Total votes		54,355	100.00%
General election
Democratic	Eleanor Holmes Norton (incumbent)	246,664	88.55%
Libertarian	Bruce Majors	16,524	5.93%
DC Statehood	Natale Nicola Stracuzzi	13,243	4.75%
Write-in		2,132	0.77%
Total votes		278,563	100.00%
Democratic hold			

2014 District of Columbia's at-large congressional district delegate election
Primary election
Party	Candidate	Votes	%
Democratic	Eleanor Holmes Norton (incumbent)	87,247	97.05%
Write-in		2,652	2.95%
Total votes		89,899	100.00%
General election
Democratic	Eleanor Holmes Norton (incumbent)	143,923	83.73%
Republican	Nelson Rimensnyder	11,673	6.79%
Independent	Timothy J. Krepp	9,101	5.30%
DC Statehood	Natale Nicola Stracuzzi	6,073	3.53%
Write-in		1,123	0.65%
Total votes		171,893	100.00%
Democratic hold			

2016 District of Columbia's at-large congressional district delegate election
Primary election
Party	Candidate	Votes	%
Democratic	Eleanor Holmes Norton (incumbent)	90,801	97.15%
Write-in		2,664	2.85%
Total votes		93,465	100.00%
General election
Democratic	Eleanor Holmes Norton (incumbent)	265,178	88.13%
Libertarian	Martin Moulton	18,713	6.22%
DC Statehood	Natale Nicola Stracuzzi	14,336	4.76%
Write-in		2,679	0.89%
Total votes		300,906	100.00%
Democratic hold			

2018 District of Columbia's at-large congressional district delegate election
Primary election
Party	Candidate	Votes	%
Democratic	Eleanor Holmes Norton (incumbent)	60,842	76.50%
Democratic	Kim R. Ford	18,178	22.86%
Write-in		515	0.65%
Total votes		79,535	100.00%
General election
Democratic	Eleanor Holmes Norton (incumbent)	199,124	87.04%
Republican	Nelson Rimensnyder	9,700	4.24%
DC Statehood	Natale Nicola Stracuzzi	8,636	3.78%
Independent	John C. Cheeks	5,509	2.41%
Libertarian	Bruce Majors	4,034	1.76%
Write-in		1,766	0.77%
Total votes		228,769	100.00%
Democratic hold			

=== 2020s ===
2020 District of Columbia's at-large congressional district delegate election
Primary election
Party	Candidate	Votes	%
Democratic	Eleanor Holmes Norton (incumbent)	103,898	98.02%
Write-in		2,100	1.98%
Total votes		105,998	100.00%
General election
Democratic	Eleanor Holmes Norton (incumbent)	281,831	86.30%
Libertarian	Patrick Hynes	9,678	2.96%
Independent	Barbara Washington Franklin	7,628	2.34%
Socialist Workers	Omari Musa	6,702	2.05%
DC Statehood	Natale Nicola Stracuzzi	5,553	1.70%
Independent	David Krucoff	5,017	1.54%
Independent	Amir Lowery	5,001	1.53%
Independent	John Cheeks	2,914	0.89%
Write-in		2,263	0.69%
Total votes		326,587	100.00%
Democratic hold			

2022 District of Columbia's at-large congressional district delegate election
Primary election
Party	Candidate	Votes	%
Democratic	Eleanor Holmes Norton (incumbent)	107,289	86.71%
Democratic	Kelly "Mikel" Williams	7,681	6.21%
Democratic	Wendy Hamilton	7,680	6.21%
Write-in		1,090	0.88%
Total votes		123,740	100.00%
General election
Democratic	Eleanor Holmes Norton (incumbent)	174,238	86.54%
Republican	Nelson Rimensnyder	11,701	5.81%
DC Statehood	Natale Nicola Stracuzzi	9,867	4.90%
Libertarian	Bruce Majors	4,003	1.99%
Write-in		1,521	0.76%
Total votes		201,330	100.00%
Democratic hold			

2024 District of Columbia's at-large congressional district delegate election
Primary election
Party	Candidate	Votes	%
Democratic	Eleanor Holmes Norton (incumbent)	72,979	79.60%
Democratic	Kelly "Mikel" Williams	17,540	19.13%
Write-in		1,164	1.27%
Total votes		91,683	100.00%
General election
Democratic	Eleanor Holmes Norton (incumbent)	251,540	80.09%
DC Statehood	Kymone Freeman	21,873	6.96%
Republican	Myrtle Patricia Alexander	19,765	6.29%
Independent	Michael A. Brown	19,033	6.06%
Write-in		1,858	0.59%
Total votes		314,069	100.00%
Democratic hold			

== See also ==
- Eleanor Holmes Norton
- District of Columbia's at-large congressional district
- District of Columbia federal voting rights
