= 2008 United States House of Representatives election in the District of Columbia =

- November 4, 2008
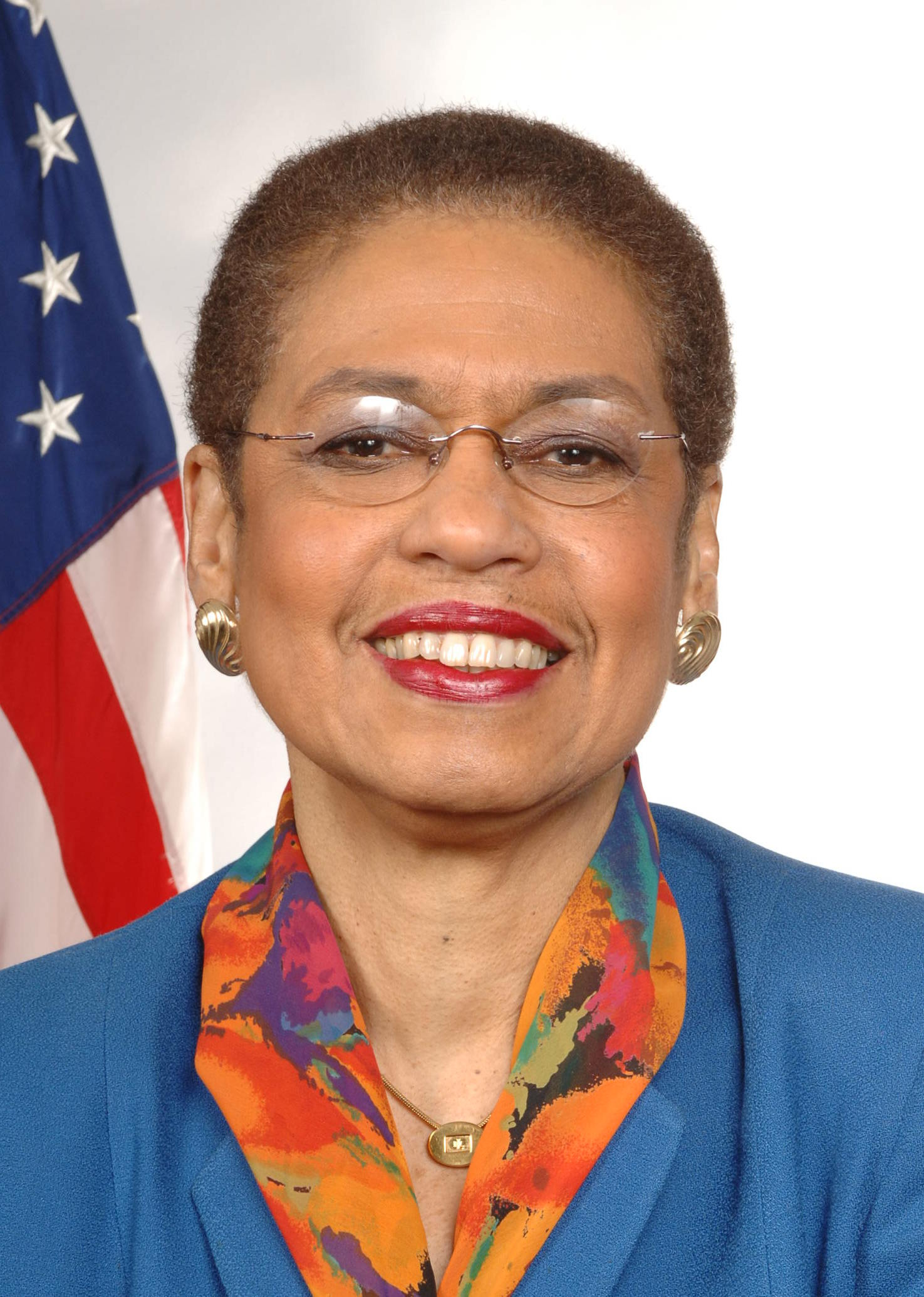

Candidate	Eleanor Holmes Norton	Maude Hills
Party	Democratic	DC Statehood Green
Popular vote	228,376	16,693
Percentage	92.28%	6.75%
- Norton: 70–80% 80–90% >90%
Delegate before election
Eleanor Holmes Norton
Democratic
Elected Delegate
Eleanor Holmes Norton
Democratic

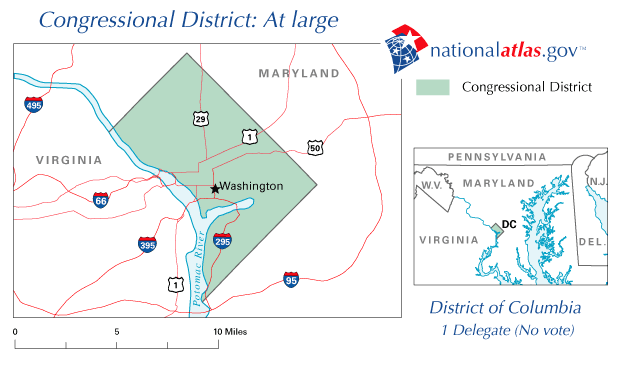
Map of the District of Columbia At-Large district.

On November 4, 2008, the District of Columbia held an election for its non-voting House delegate representing the District of Columbia's at-large congressional district. The winner of the race was incumbent Eleanor Holmes Norton (D).

The delegate is elected for two-year terms. This election coincided with the 2008 U.S. presidential election.

== Candidates ==
Incumbent Delegate Eleanor Holmes Norton, a Democrat, sought re-election for a 10th full term to the United States House of Representatives. She launched her re-election campaign with an announcement at the Eastern Market playground on May 10, 2008.

Norton was opposed by Green Party candidate Maude Hills and Seth Dellinger, a candidate for the Socialist Workers Party. The incumbent won reelection with over 85% of the vote.

== Results ==
District of Columbia's at-large congressional district election, 2008
Party	Candidate	Votes	%
Democratic	Eleanor Norton (inc.)	228,376	92.28
DC Statehood Green	Maude Hills	16,693	6.75
Write-in		2,402	0.97
Total votes		247,471	100.00
Democratic hold			

== See also ==
- United States House of Representatives elections in the District of Columbia
