= 1996 United States House of Representatives election in the District of Columbia =

- November 5, 1996
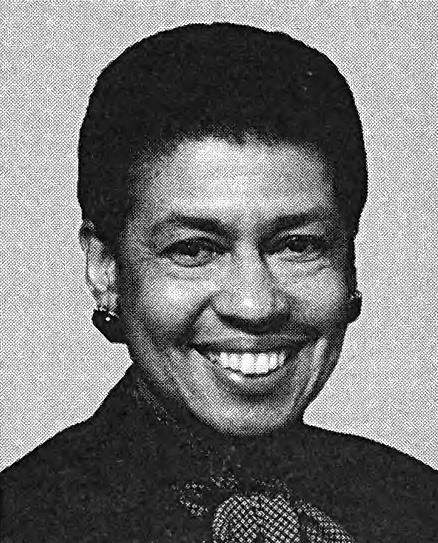

Candidate	Eleanor Holmes Norton	Sprague Simonds
Party	Democratic	Republican
Popular vote	134,996	11,306
Percentage	90.00%	7.54%
Delegate before election
Eleanor Holmes Norton
Democratic
Elected Delegate
Eleanor Holmes Norton
Democratic

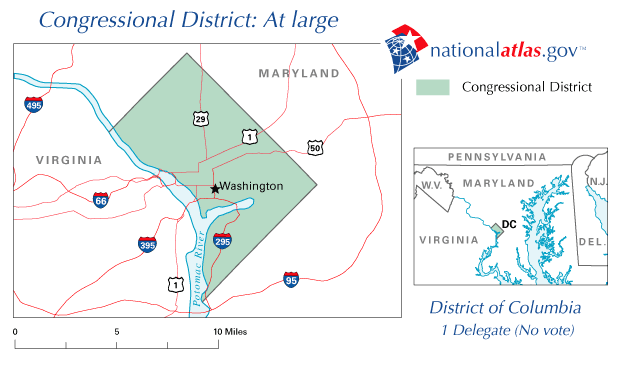
Map of the District of Columbia At-Large district.

On November 5, 1996, the District of Columbia held an election for its non-voting House delegate representing the District of Columbia's at-large congressional district. The winner of the race was Eleanor Holmes Norton (D), who won her third re-election. All elected members would serve in 105th United States Congress.

The delegate is elected for two-year terms.

== Candidates ==
Eleanor Holmes Norton, a Democrat, sought election for her fourth term to the United States House of Representatives. Norton was opposed in this election by Republican challenger Sprague Simonds who received 7.54%. This resulted in Norton being re-elected with 90% of the vote.

=== Results ===
D.C. At Large Congressional District Election (1996)
Party	Candidate	Votes	%
Democratic	Eleanor Holmes Norton (inc.)	134,996	90.00
Republican	Sprague Simonds	11,306	7.54
Independent	Faith	2,119	1.41
Socialist Workers	Sam Manuel	1,146	0.76
No party	Write-ins	431	0.29
Total votes		149,998	100.00
Turnout			
Democratic hold			

== See also ==
- United States House of Representatives elections in the District of Columbia
