= 2000 United States House of Representatives election in the District of Columbia =

- November 2, 2000
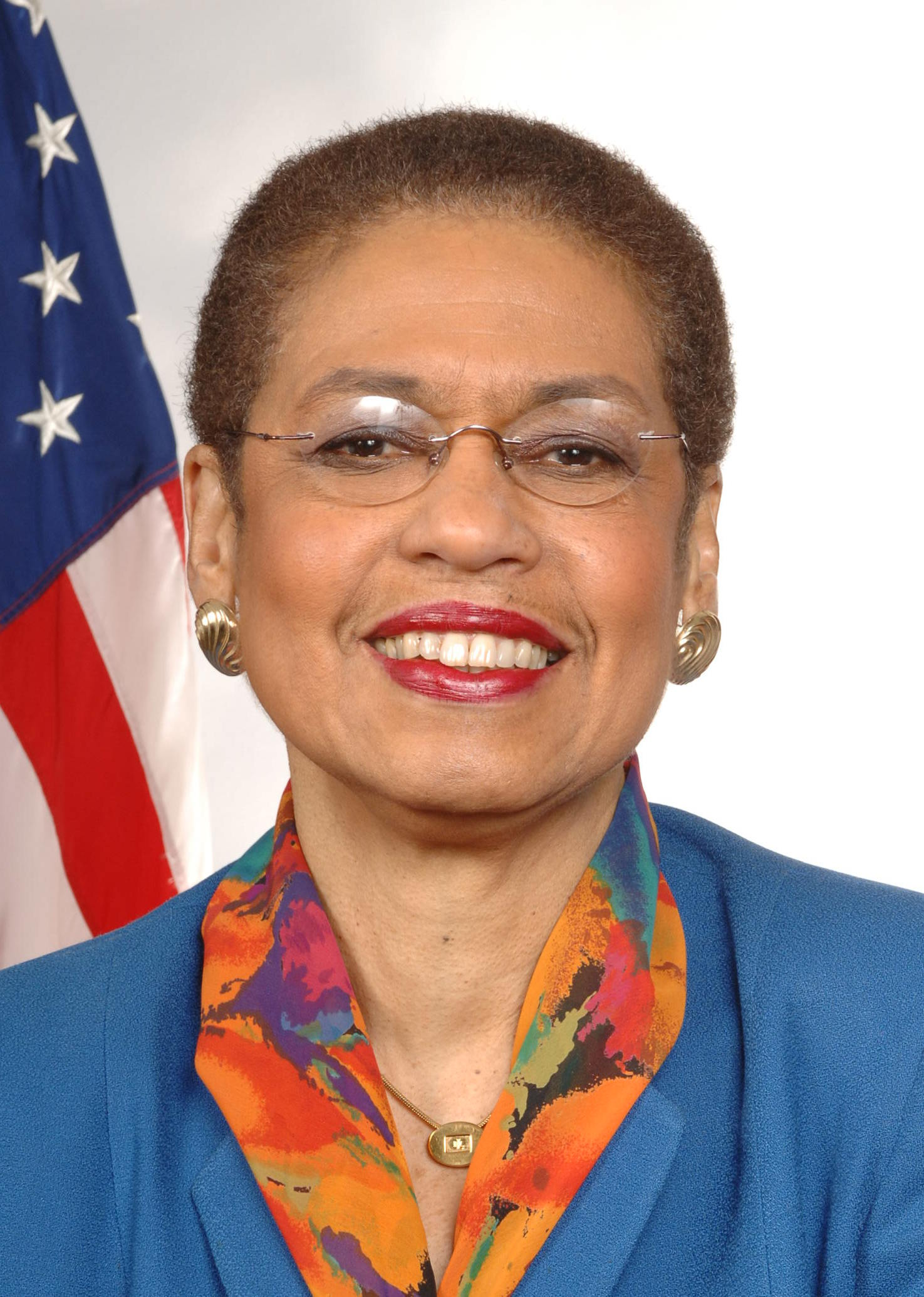

Candidate	Eleanor Holmes Norton	Edward Henry Wolterbeek
Party	Democratic	Republican
Popular vote	158,824	10,258
Percentage	90.43%	5.84%
Delegate before election
Eleanor Holmes Norton
Democratic
Elected Delegate
Eleanor Holmes Norton
Democratic

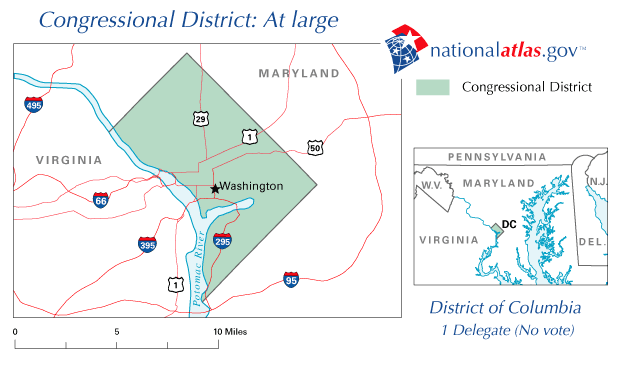
Map of the District of Columbia At-Large district.

On November 2, 2000, the District of Columbia held an election for its non-voting House delegate representing the District of Columbia's at-large congressional district. The winner of the race was incumbent Eleanor Holmes Norton (D).

The delegate is elected for two-year terms.

== Candidates ==
Incumbent Del. Eleanor Holmes Norton, a Democrat, sought re-election for a 6th full term to the United States House of Representatives. Norton was opposed in this election by Republican challenger Edward Henry Wolterbeek who received 5.84%, and Libertarian Robert D. Kampia who received 2.62%. This resulted in Norton being re-elected with 90.43% of the vote.

=== Results ===
D.C. At Large Congressional District Election (2000)
Party	Candidate	Votes	%
Democratic	Eleanor Holmes Norton (inc.)	158,824	90.43
Republican	Edward Henry Wolterbeek	10,258	5.84
Libertarian	Robert D. Kampia	4,594	2.62
Socialist Workers	Sam Manuel	1,419	0.81
No party	Others	536	0.31
Total votes		175,631	100.00
Turnout			
Democratic hold			

== See also ==
- United States House of Representatives elections in the District of Columbia
