= 1994 United States House of Representatives election in the District of Columbia =

- November 8, 1994
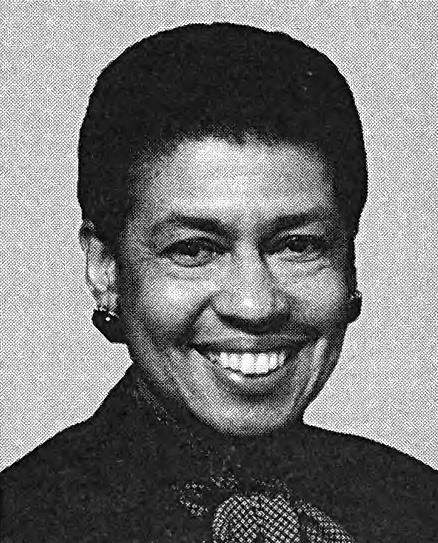

Candidate	Eleanor Holmes Norton	Donald A. Saltz
Party	Democratic	Republican
Popular vote	154,988	13,828
Percentage	89.25%	7.96%
Delegate before election
Eleanor Holmes Norton
Democratic
Elected Delegate
Eleanor Holmes Norton
Democratic

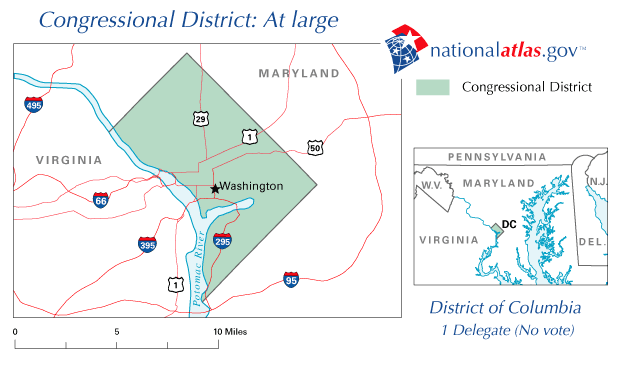
Map of the District of Columbia At-Large district.

On November 8, 1994, the District of Columbia held an election for its non-voting House delegate representing the District of Columbia's at-large congressional district. The winner of the race was Eleanor Holmes Norton (D), who won her second re-election. All elected members would serve in 104th United States Congress.

The delegate is elected for two-year terms.

== Candidates ==
Eleanor Holmes Norton, a Democrat, sought election for her third term to the United States House of Representatives. Norton was opposed in this election by Republican challenger Donald A. Saltz who received 7.96%. This resulted in Norton being re-elected with 89.25% of the vote.

=== Results ===
D.C. At Large Congressional District Election (1994)
Party	Candidate	Votes	%
Democratic	Eleanor Holmes Norton (inc.)	154,988	89.25
Republican	Donald A. Saltz	13,828	7.96
DC Statehood	Rasco P. Braswell	2,824	1.63
Socialist Workers	Bradley Downs	1,476	0.85
No party	Write-ins	548	0.32
Total votes		173,664	100.00
Turnout			
Democratic hold			

== See also ==
- United States House of Representatives elections in the District of Columbia
