= 1998 United States House of Representatives election in the District of Columbia =

- November 3, 1998
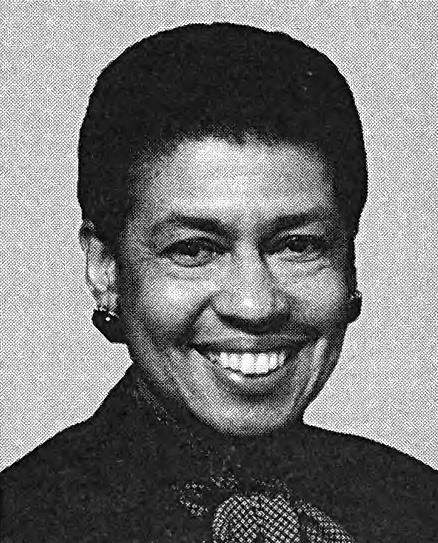

Candidate	Eleanor Holmes Norton	Edward Henry Wolterbeek
Party	Democratic	Republican
Popular vote	122,228	8,610
Percentage	89.64%	6.31%
Delegate before election
Eleanor Holmes Norton
Democratic
Elected Delegate
Eleanor Holmes Norton
Democratic

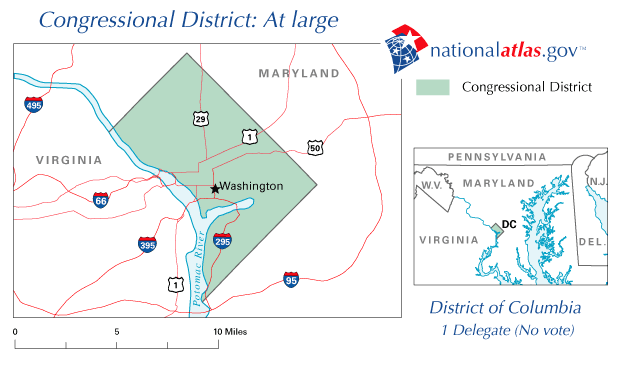
Map of the District of Columbia At-Large district.

On November 3, 1998, the District of Columbia held an election for its non-voting House delegate representing the District of Columbia's at-large congressional district. The winner of the race was Eleanor Holmes Norton (D), who won her fourth re-election. All elected members would serve in 106th United States Congress.

The delegate is elected for two-year terms.

== Candidates ==
Eleanor Holmes Norton, a Democrat, sought election for her fifth term to the United States House of Representatives. Norton was opposed in this election by Republican challenger Edward Henry Wolterbeek who received 6.31%. This resulted in Norton being re-elected with 89.64% of the vote.

=== Results ===
D.C. At Large Congressional District Election (1998)
Party	Candidate	Votes	%
Democratic	Eleanor Holmes Norton (inc.)	122,228	89.64
Republican	Edward Henry Wolterbeek	8,610	6.31
DC Statehood	Pat Kidd	2,323	1.70
Independent	Natale "Lino" Stracuzzi	1,647	1.21
Socialist Workers	Mary Martin	1,087	0.80
No party	Write-ins	464	0.34
Total votes		136,359	100.00
Turnout			
Democratic hold			

== See also ==
- United States House of Representatives elections in the District of Columbia
