= 1992 United States House of Representatives election in the District of Columbia =

- November 3, 1992
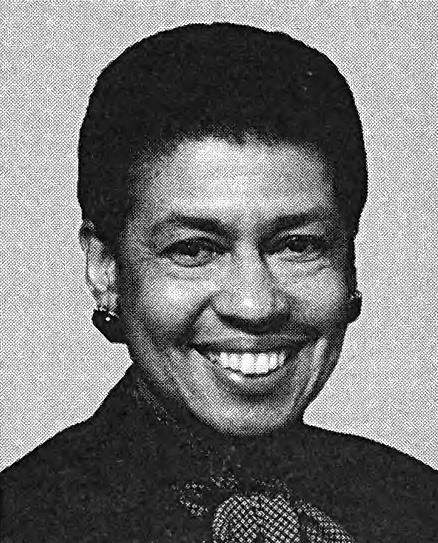

Candidate	Eleanor Holmes Norton	Susan Emerson
Party	Democratic	Republican
Popular vote	166,808	20,108
Percentage	84.78%	10.22%
Delegate before election
Eleanor Holmes Norton
Democratic
Elected Delegate
Eleanor Holmes Norton
Democratic

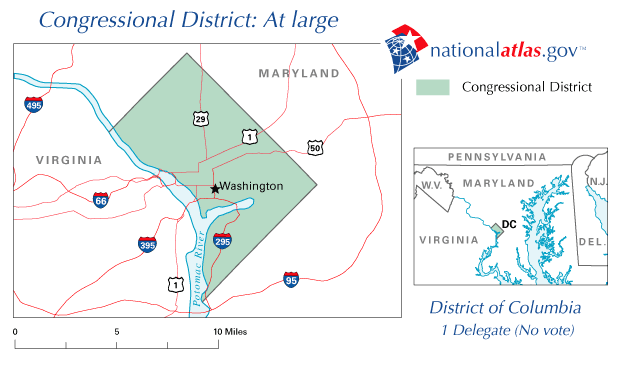
Map of the District of Columbia At-Large district.

On November 3, 1992, the District of Columbia held an election for its non-voting House delegate representing the District of Columbia's at-large congressional district. The winner of the race was Eleanor Holmes Norton (D), who won her first re-election. All elected members would serve in 103rd United States Congress.

The delegate is elected for two-year terms.

== Candidates ==
Eleanor Holmes Norton, a Democrat, sought election for her second term to the United States House of Representatives. Norton was opposed in this election by Republican challenger Susan Emerson who received 10.22%. This resulted in Norton being re-elected with 84.78% of the vote.

=== Results ===
D.C. At Large Congressional District Election (1992)
Party	Candidate	Votes	%
Democratic	Eleanor Holmes Norton (inc.)	166,808	84.78
Republican	Susan Emerson	20,108	10.22
DC Statehood	Susan Griffin	7,253	3.69
Socialist Workers	Sam Manuel	1,840	0.94
No party	Write-ins	745	0.38
Total votes		196,754	100.00
Turnout			
Democratic hold			

== See also ==
- United States House of Representatives elections in the District of Columbia
