= 2010 United States House of Representatives election in the District of Columbia =

- November 2, 2010
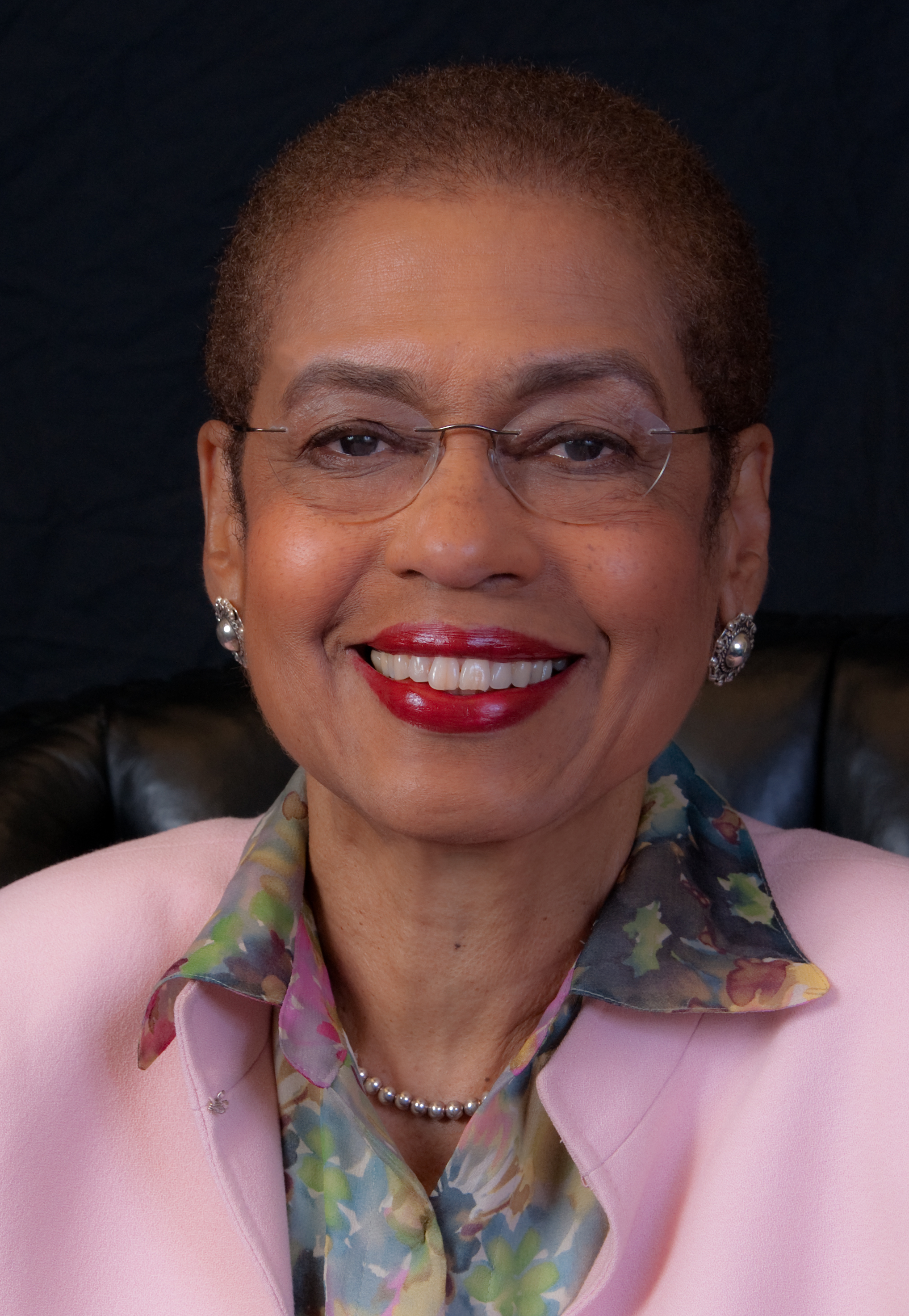

| Candidate | Eleanor Holmes Norton | Missy Reilly Smith |
| Party | Democratic | Republican |
| Popular vote | 117,990 | 11,673 |
| Percentage | 88.94% | 6.58% |
- Norton: 60–70% 70–80% 80–90% >90%
Delegate before election
Eleanor Holmes Norton
Democratic
Elected Delegate
Eleanor Holmes Norton
Democratic

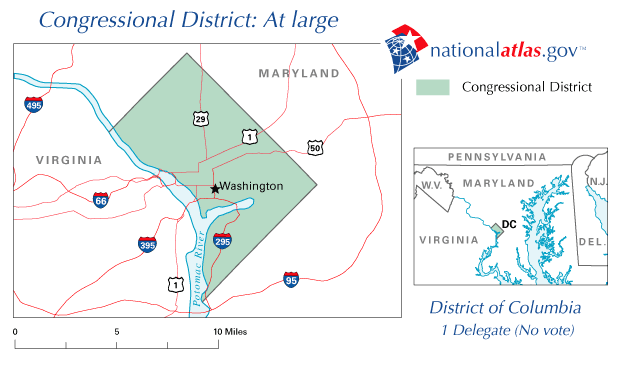
Map of the District of Columbia at-large district.

On November 2, 2010, the District of Columbia held an election for its non-voting House delegate representing the District of Columbia's at-large congressional district. The winner of the race is to serve in the 112th Congress from January 3, 2011, until January 3, 2013.

The delegate is elected for two-year terms.

== Match-up summary ==
| District | Incumbent | 2010 Status | Democratic | Republican | Green |
|---|---|---|---|---|---|
| At-large | Eleanor Holmes Norton | | Eleanor Holmes Norton | Missy Reilly Smith | Rick Tingling-Clemmons |

== Candidates ==
Eleanor Holmes Norton, a Democrat, has held the seat since 1991 and was up for reelection in 2010. Her Democratic opponent in the primary election was Douglass Sloan, who is only the second candidate to ever challenge Holmes Norton in a primary since she took office in 1991.

Missy Reilly Smith, an anti-abortion activist, was the Republican candidate. She ran unopposed in the primary election. Smith caused a controversy by running television ads featuring graphic images of aborted fetuses. Smith herself had undergone two abortions in the past.

== Primary ==
The primary election took place on for September 14 for both the offices of Delegate and Shadow Representative. Incumbent Eleanor Norton Holmes faced only the second primary challenge since she took office in 1991.

Democratic Primary results
| Party | Candidate | Votes | % |
|---|---|---|---|
| Democratic | Eleanor Holmes Norton | 96,808 | 90.01 |
| Democratic | Doug Sloan | 10,069 | 9.36 |
| Democratic | Write-ins | 676 | 0.63 |

== General election ==
District of Columbia at-Large congressional district election, 2010
| Party | Candidate | Votes | % |
|---|---|---|---|
| Democratic | Eleanor Holmes Norton (inc.) | 117,990 | 88.94 |
| Republican | Missy Reilly Smith | 8,109 | 6.11 |
| DC Statehood Green | Rick Tingling-Clemmons | 4,413 | 3.33 |
| Independent | Sarah "Queen" Noble | 785 | 0.59 |
| Write-In | | 1,359 | 1.02 |
| Total votes | | 132,656 | 100 |

== See also ==
- United States House of Representatives elections in the District of Columbia
