= 2002 United States House of Representatives election in the District of Columbia =

- November 2, 2002
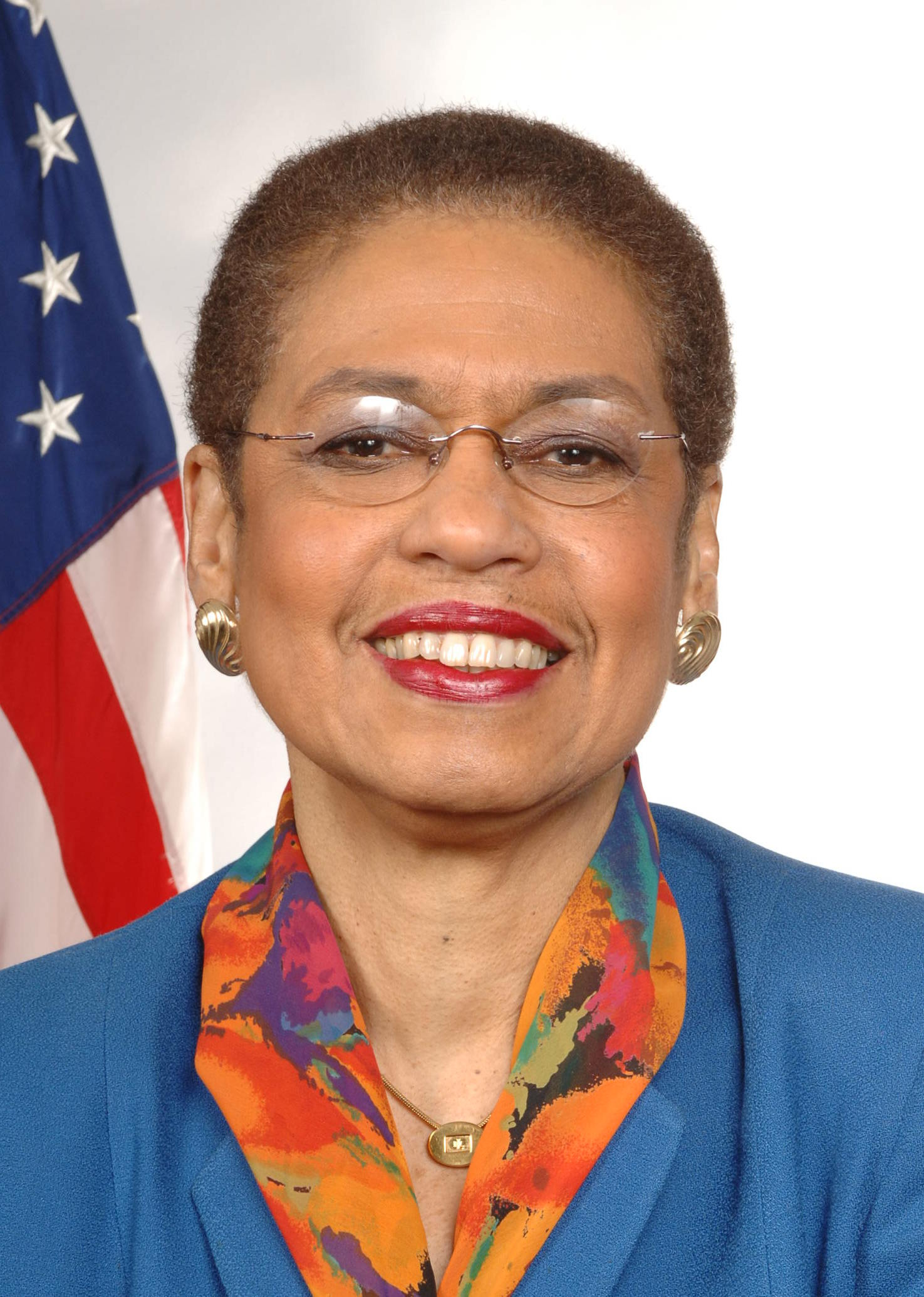

Candidate	Eleanor Holmes Norton	Patt Kidd
Party	Democratic	Independent
Popular vote	119,268	7,733
Percentage	93.01%	6.03%
- Results by ward: Norton—>90% Norton—80–90%
Delegate before election
Eleanor Holmes Norton
Democratic
Elected Delegate
Eleanor Holmes Norton
Democratic

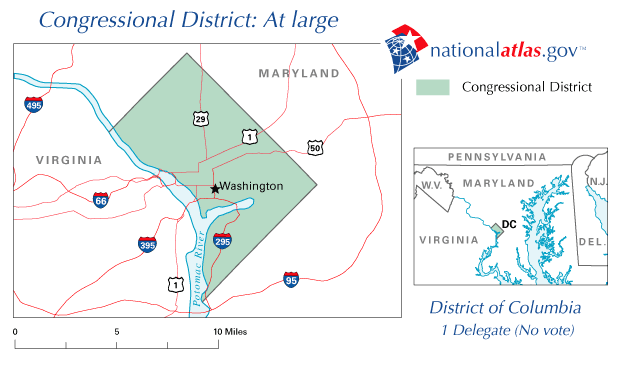
Map of the District of Columbia At-Large district.

On November 2, 2002, the District of Columbia held an election for its non-voting House delegate representing the District of Columbia's at-large congressional district. The winner of the race was incumbent Eleanor Holmes Norton (D).

The delegate is elected for two-year terms.

== Candidates ==
Incumbent Del. Eleanor Holmes Norton, a Democrat, sought re-election for a 7th full term to the United States House of Representatives. Norton was opposed in this election by independent challenger Pat Kidd who received 6.03%, resulting in Norton being re-elected with 93.01% of the vote.

=== Results ===
D.C. At Large Congressional District Election (2002)
Party	Candidate	Votes	%
Democratic	Eleanor Holmes Norton (inc.)	119,268	93.01
Independent	Pat Kidd	7,733	6.03
No party	Others	1,232	0.96
Total votes		128,233	100.00
Turnout			
Democratic hold			

== See also ==
- United States House of Representatives elections in the District of Columbia
