= 2006 United States House of Representatives election in the District of Columbia =

- November 7, 2006
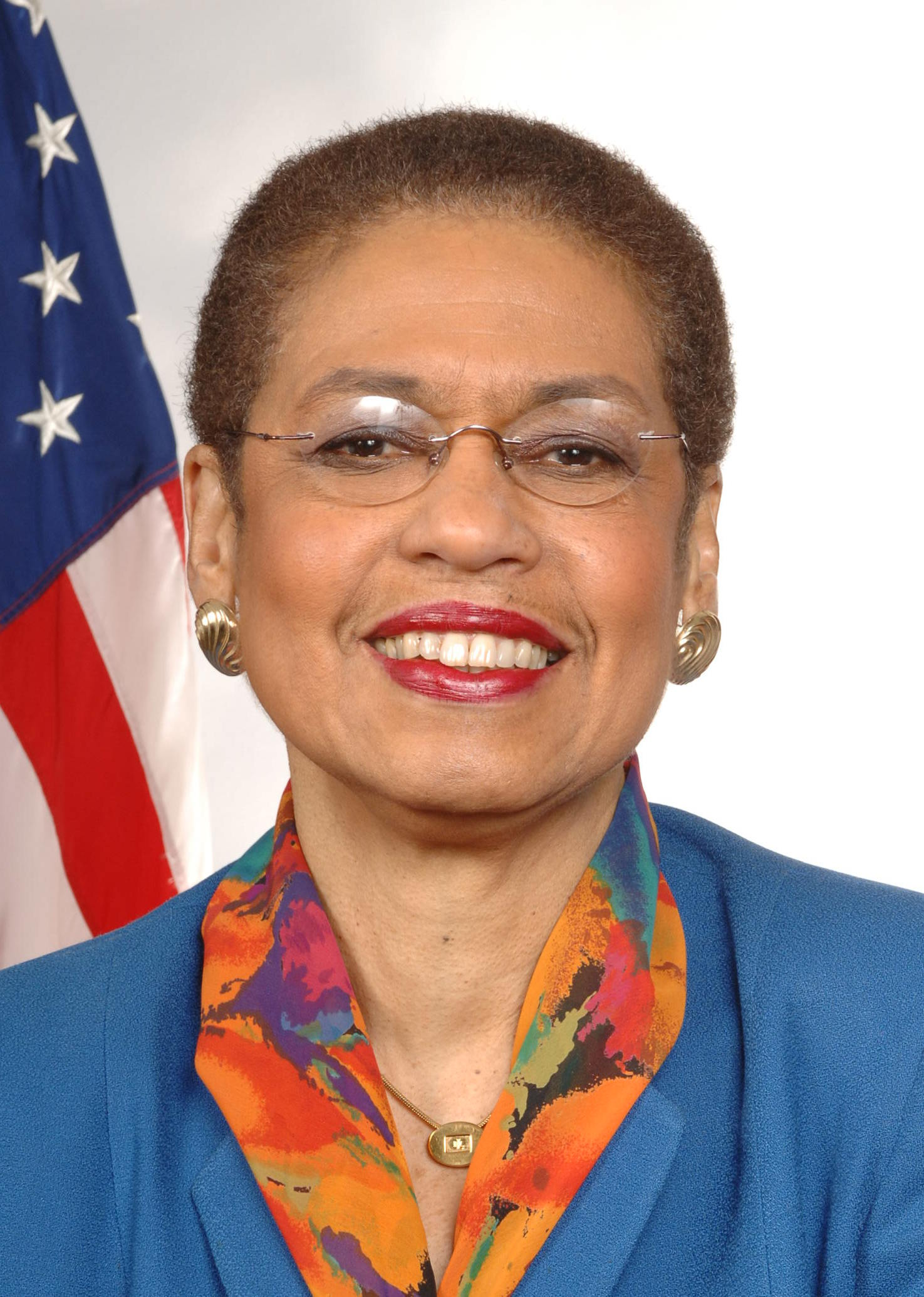
Candidate	Eleanor Holmes Norton
Party	Democratic
Popular vote	111,726
Percentage	97.34%
- Results by ward: Norton—>90%
Delegate before election
Eleanor Holmes Norton
Democratic
Elected Delegate
Eleanor Holmes Norton
Democratic

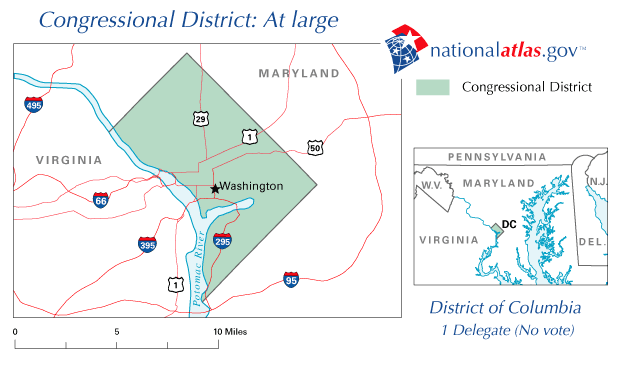
Map of the District of Columbia At-Large district.

On November 7, 2006, the District of Columbia held an election for its non-voting House delegate representing the District of Columbia's at-large congressional district. The winner of the race was incumbent Eleanor Holmes Norton (D).

The delegate is elected for two-year terms.

== Candidates ==
Incumbent Del. Eleanor Holmes Norton, a Democrat, sought re-election for a 9th full term to the United States House of Representatives. Norton was unopposed in this election, receiving opposition only from write-in candidates and winning re-election with 97.3% of the vote.

=== Results ===
D.C. At Large Congressional District Election (2006)
Party	Candidate	Votes	%
Democratic	Eleanor Holmes Norton (inc.)	111,726	97.34
No party	Others	3,051	2.66
Total votes		114,777	100.00
Turnout			
Democratic hold			

== See also ==
- United States House of Representatives elections in the District of Columbia
