= District of Columbia's at-large congressional district =

At-large U.S. House district for the District of Columbia

Coordinates: 38°54′15″N 77°01′02″W

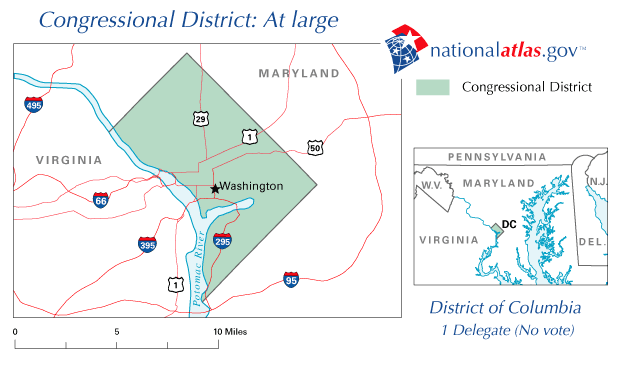
- Delegate: Eleanor Holmes Norton; D–Washington
- Area: 61 mi^{2} (160 km^{2})
- Distribution: 100.0% urban; 0.0% rural
- Population (2022): 671,803
- Median household income: $101,027
- Ethnicity: 44.2% Black; 38.0% White; 11.3% Hispanic; 6.6% Asian; 1.7% Native American; 0.2% Pacific Islander Americans
- Cook PVI: D+44

The District of Columbia's at-large congressional district is a congressional district encompassing all the District of Columbia, the federal district of the United States. Article One of the United States Constitution instructs that only "States" may be represented in the United States Congress. Because the District of Columbia does not meet that criterion, the member elected from the at-large district is not permitted to participate in votes on the floor of the House. Instead, constituents of the seat elect a non-voting delegate to the chamber. Though the delegate lacks full voting privileges, they are permitted to sit on, cast votes in, and chair congressional committees and subcommittees. The delegate may also join party caucuses, introduce legislation, and hire staff to assist with constituent services.

The modern office of delegate from the District of Columbia was established in 1971. Since then, it has been represented by just two individuals, both of them African American Democrats. Walter Fauntroy served as delegate from its establishment until 1991. He was succeeded by the District's current delegate, Eleanor Holmes Norton, an advocate for D.C. statehood. After holding the seat for more than 60% of its existence, Norton declined to seek an additional term in 2026, and will be replaced by Robert White in 2027.

== History of the office ==
The office of delegate from the District of Columbia was initially established by Radical Republicans during the Reconstruction era. From 1871 to 1875, it was held by Norton P. Chipman, a Republican who had been appointed the first secretary of the District of Columbia by President Ulysses S. Grant. The position was abolished in 1875 and remained nonexistent for 96 years.

District of Columbia Delegate Act
- Long title: An Act to establish a Commission on the Organization of the Government of the District of Columbia and to provide for a Delegate to the House of Representatives from the District of Columbia.
- Enacted by: the 91st United States Congress
- Effective: September 22, 1970

Citations
- Public law: Pub. L. 91–405
- Statutes at Large: 84 Stat. 845

Codification
- Titles amended: Title 2—The Congress
- U.S.C. sections created: 2 U.S.C. § 25a

Legislative history
- Introduced in the House as H.R. 18725 by Ancher Nelsen (R–MN) on July 30, 1970; Committee consideration by House District of Columbia; Passed the House on August 10, 1970 (302–57); Passed the Senate on September 9, 1970; Signed into law by President Richard Nixon on September 22, 1970

During the mid-20th century, there was a renewed push to extend greater voting rights to residents of Washington, D.C. By 1961, the necessary 37 states had successfully ratified the Twenty-third Amendment to the United States Constitution, which extended the District of Columbia the right to vote in presidential elections. Still, there remained bipartisan agreement that the District of Columbia – which in 1970 had more residents than 10 individual states (Note: They were Alaska, Delaware, Idaho, Montana, Nevada, New Hampshire, North Dakota, South Dakota, Vermont, and Wyoming.) — deserved at least some representation in the U.S. Congress.

Federal legislation to recreate a congressional delegate position for D.C. was first seriously debated by Congress in 1970. President Richard Nixon had repeatedly expressed his support for full voting representation for the District of Columbia. An initial proposal by Rep. Earle Cabell (D–TX) suggested creating two non-voting delegate positions for D.C.: one for the House and one for the Senate. Concerns that the Senate would stall such a proposal spurred the consideration of a compromise bill introduced by Rep. Ancher Nelsen (R–MN), who at the time served as ranking member of the House Committee on the District of Columbia. Nelsen's proposal guaranteed non-voting representation only in the House.

In a written message to House Minority Leader Gerald Ford on August 6, 1970, Nixon reaffirmed that "voting representation for the District of Columbia is my goal" and strongly urged Ford to press for the bill's passage. Ford and House Majority Leader Carl Albert both crafted messages to their respective caucuses in response, encouraging their members to support the measure. During closing arguments on the House floor, two representatives made particularly passionate pleas on the capital city's behalf. The first came from Rep. John Conyers (D–MI), who decried the "rank hypocrisy" of denying "a voice in our Government to the people who live closest to it." The second came from Rep. Michael J. Harrington (D–MA), who noted the lack of attention shown by the Congress to Washington:

"I have visited those parts of the city which the tourist never sees, and I am shaken. Many areas damaged in the riot of 1968 have never been repaired. Many buildings are still blackened and boarded up. Housing is inadequate, schools are inadequate, transportation is inadequate, and no one has real authority to act effectively for the black majority of this city. The Congress simply does not have the time or the interest to run a large city. It is time we recognized this fact, and permitted the city to govern itself. The complexities of city government, the day-to-day decisions should not be placed in the hands of 535 different people — all of whom have to pass on matters about which they have little concern and about which they lack the time to be informed."

Opposition to the legislation was largely spearheaded by Rep. John L. McMillan (D–SC), the segregationist chairman of the House Committee on the District of Columbia. As chairman, McMillan repeatedly opposed home rule and greater rights for residents of D.C., largely because of its sizable Black population. The bill ultimately passed the House with 302 votes in favor and 57 votes against. The "nay" votes came predominately from Southerners. On September 9, 1970, the legislation passed the Senate. President Nixon, who called the District's lack of voting rights "one of the truly unacceptable facts of American life," signed the District of Columbia Delegate Act 13 days later.

The first election for the seat was held on March 23, 1971. Democrat Walter Fauntroy won the race and went on to serve in the Congress for nearly 20 years. A week after being sworn in, Fauntroy became one of the 13 founding members of the Congressional Black Caucus.

A further effort to grant the District of Columbia full voting rights in Congress via a constitutional amendment came in 1978. The District of Columbia Voting Rights Amendment passed both chambers of Congress, but it failed to receive the necessary number of state ratifications by its 1985 deadline. Reflecting increased political polarization, efforts to secure D.C. further voting rights since have largely failed along party lines.

Since 1993, when the House of Representatives has been under Democratic control, delegates, including the District of Columbia's delegate, have been allowed to cast non-binding floor votes when the House of Representatives was operating in the Committee of the Whole.

The district has been represented by Democrat Eleanor Holmes Norton since 1991.

== List of delegates representing the district ==
Delegate	Party	Term	Cong ress	Electoral history
District established March 4, 1871
Vacant		March 4, 1871 – April 21, 1871	42nd	
Norton P. Chipman	Republican	April 21, 1871 – March 3, 1875	42nd 43rd	Elected to finish the vacant term. Re-elected in 1872. Seat eliminated.
District dissolved March 4, 1875
District re-established September 22, 1970
Vacant		September 22, 1970 – March 23, 1971	91st 92nd	
Walter Fauntroy	Democratic	March 23, 1971 – January 3, 1991	92nd 93rd 94th 95th 96th 97th 98th 99th 100th 101st	Elected to finish the vacant term. Re-elected in 1972. Re-elected in 1974. Re-elected in 1976. Re-elected in 1978. Re-elected in 1980. Re-elected in 1982. Re-elected in 1984. Re-elected in 1986. Re-elected in 1988. Retired to run for Mayor of the District of Columbia
Eleanor Holmes Norton	Democratic	January 3, 1991 – present	102nd 103rd 104th 105th 106th 107th 108th 109th 110th 111th 112th 113th 114th 115th 116th 117th 118th 119th	Elected in 1990. Re-elected in 1992. Re-elected in 1994. Re-elected in 1996. Re-elected in 1998. Re-elected in 2000. Re-elected in 2002. Re-elected in 2004. Re-elected in 2006. Re-elected in 2008. Re-elected in 2010. Re-elected in 2012. Re-elected in 2014. Re-elected in 2016. Re-elected in 2018. Re-elected in 2020. Re-elected in 2022. Re-elected in 2024. Retiring at the end of term.
Robert White	Democratic	Assuming office on January 3, 2027		Elected in 2026.

== Election results ==
=== 1870s ===
D.C. At Large Congressional District Special Election (April 21, 1871)
Party	Candidate	Votes	%
Republican	Norton P. Chipman	15,196	57.78
Democratic	Richard T. Merrick	11,104	42.22
Total votes		26,300	100.00
Republican win (new seat)			

D.C. At Large Congressional District Election (1873)
Party	Candidate	Votes	%
Republican	Norton P. Chipman (Incumbent)	12,443	63.86
Democratic	L.G. Hine	7,042	36.14
Total votes		19,485	100.00
Republican hold			

=== 1970s ===
D.C. At Large Congressional District Special Election (March 23, 1971)
Party	Candidate	Votes	%
Democratic	Walter E. Fauntroy	68,166	58.44
Republican	John Nevius	29,249	25.08
DC Statehood	Julius Hobson	15,427	13.23
Independent	Frank Kameny	1,888	1.62
Independent	Douglas Moore	1,301	1.12
Socialist Workers	James E. Harris	431	0.37
Write-in		173	0.15
Total votes		116,635	100.00
Democratic win (new seat)			

D.C. At Large Congressional District Election (1972)
Party	Candidate	Votes	%
Democratic	Walter E. Fauntroy (Incumbent)	95,300	60.64
Republican	William Chin-Lee	39,487	25.12
DC Statehood	Charles I. Cassell	18,730	11.92
Independent	David H. Dabney	2,514	1.60
Socialist Workers	Herman Fagg	1,133	0.72
Total votes		157,164	100.00
Democratic hold			

D.C. At Large Congressional District Election (1974)
Party	Candidate	Votes	%
Democratic	Walter E. Fauntroy (Incumbent)	66,337	63.78
Independent	James G. Banks	21,874	21.03
Republican	William R. Phillips	9,166	8.81
DC Statehood	Anton V. Wood	3,039	2.92
U.S. Labor	Susan Pennington	1,813	1.74
Independent	David H. Dabney	1,539	1.48
Write-in		246	0.24
Total votes		104,014	100.00
Democratic hold			

D.C. At Large Congressional District Election (1976)
Party	Candidate	Votes	%
Democratic	Walter E. Fauntroy (Incumbent)	12,149	77.18
Republican	Daniel L. Hall	1,566	9.95
DC Statehood	Louis S. Aronica	1,076	6.84
Socialist Workers	Charlotte J. Reavis	499	3.17
U.S. Labor	Susan Pennington	377	2.39
Write-in		75	0.48
Total votes		15,742	100.00
Democratic hold			

D.C. At Large Congressional District Election (1978)
Party	Candidate	Votes	%
Democratic	Walter E. Fauntroy (Incumbent)	76,557	79.59
Republican	Jackson R. Champion	11,677	12.02
DC Statehood	Gregory Rowe	3,886	4.04
Socialist Workers	Charlotte J. Reavis	1,649	1.71
U.S. Labor	Cloid John Green	1,064	1.10
Write-in		1,473	1.53
Total votes		96,306	100.00
Democratic hold			

=== 1980s ===
D.C. At Large Congressional District Election (1980)
Party	Candidate	Votes	%
Democratic	Walter E. Fauntroy (Incumbent)	111,631	74.44
Republican	Robert J. Roehr	21,021	14.02
DC Statehood	Josephine D. Butler	14,325	9.55
Write-in		2,979	1.99
Total votes		149,956	100.00
Democratic hold			

D.C. At Large Congressional District Election (1982)
Party	Candidate	Votes	%
Democratic	Walter E. Fauntroy (Incumbent)	93,422	83.01
Republican	John West	17,242	15.32
Write-in		1,879	1.67
Total votes		112,543	100.00
Democratic hold			

D.C. At Large Congressional District Election (1984)
Party	Candidate	Votes	%
Democratic	Walter E. Fauntroy (Incumbent)	154,583	95.56
Write-in		7,188	4.44
Total votes		161,771	100.00
Democratic hold			

D.C. At Large Congressional District Election (1986)
Party	Candidate	Votes	%
Democratic	Walter E. Fauntroy (Incumbent)	101,604	80.09
Republican	Mary L. H. King	17,643	13.91
DC Statehood	Julie McCall	6,122	4.83
Write-in		1,486	1.17
Total votes		126,855	100.00
Democratic hold			

D.C. At Large Congressional District Election (1988)
Party	Candidate	Votes	%
Democratic	Walter E. Fauntroy (Incumbent)	121,817	71.27
Republican	Ron Evans	22,936	13.42
DC Statehood	Alvin C. Frost	13,802	8.07
Independent	David H. Dabney	10,449	6.11
Write-in		1,929	1.13
Total votes		170,933	100.00
Democratic hold			

=== 1990s ===
D.C. At Large Congressional District Election (1990)
Party	Candidate	Votes	%
Democratic	Eleanor Holmes Norton	98,442	61.67
Republican	Harry M. Singleton	41,999	26.31
Independent	George X. Cure	8,156	5.11
DC Statehood	Leon Frederick Hunt	4,027	2.52
Independent	David H. Dabney	3,334	2.09
Write-in		3,669	2.30
Total votes		159,627	100.00
Democratic hold			

D.C. At Large Congressional District Election (1992)
Party	Candidate	Votes	%
Democratic	Eleanor Holmes Norton (Incumbent)	166,808	84.78
Republican	Susan Emerson	20,108	10.22
DC Statehood	Susan Griffin	7,253	3.69
Socialist Workers	Sam Manuel	1,840	0.94
Write-in		745	0.38
Total votes		196,754	100.00
Democratic hold			

D.C. At Large Congressional District Election (1994)
Party	Candidate	Votes	%
Democratic	Eleanor Holmes Norton (Incumbent)	154,988	89.25
Republican	Donald A. Saltz	13,828	7.96
DC Statehood	Rasco P. Braswell	2,824	1.63
Socialist Workers	Bradley Downs	1,476	0.85
Write-in		548	0.32
Total votes		173,664	100.00
Democratic hold			

D.C. At Large Congressional District Election (1996)
Party	Candidate	Votes	%
Democratic	Eleanor Holmes Norton (Incumbent)	134,996	90.00
Republican	Sprague Simonds	11,306	7.54
Independent	Faith	2,119	1.41
Socialist Workers	Sam Manuel	1,146	0.76
Write-in		431	0.29
Total votes		149,998	100.00
Democratic hold			

D.C. At Large Congressional District Election (1998)
Party	Candidate	Votes	%
Democratic	Eleanor Holmes Norton (Incumbent)	122,228	89.64
Republican	Edward Henry Wolterbeek	8,610	6.31
DC Statehood	Pat Kidd	2,323	1.70
Independent	Natale "Lino" Stracuzzi	1,647	1.21
Socialist Workers	Mary Martin	1,087	0.80
Write-in		464	0.34
Total votes		136,359	100.00
Democratic hold			

=== 2000s ===
D.C. At Large Congressional District Election (2000)
Party	Candidate	Votes	%
Democratic	Eleanor Holmes Norton (Incumbent)	158,824	90.43
Republican	Edward Henry Wolterbeek	10,258	5.84
Libertarian	Robert D. Kampia	4,594	2.62
Socialist Workers	Sam Manuel	1,419	0.81
Write-in		536	0.31
Total votes		175,631	100.00
Democratic hold			

D.C. At Large Congressional District Election (2002)
Party	Candidate	Votes	%
Democratic	Eleanor Holmes Norton (Incumbent)	119,268	93.01
Independent	Pat Kidd	7,733	6.03
Write-in		1,232	0.96
Total votes		128,233	100.00
Democratic hold			

D.C. At Large Congressional District Election (2004)
Party	Candidate	Votes	%
Democratic	Eleanor Holmes Norton (Incumbent)	202,027	91.33
Republican	Michael Andrew Monroe	18,296	8.27
Write-in		890	0.40
Total votes		221,213	100.00
Democratic hold			

D.C. At Large Congressional District Election (2006)
Party	Candidate	Votes	%
Democratic	Eleanor Holmes Norton (Incumbent)	111,726	97.34
Write-in		3,051	2.66
Total votes		114,777	100.00
Democratic hold			

D.C. At Large Congressional District Election (2008)
Party	Candidate	Votes	%
Democratic	Eleanor Holmes Norton (Incumbent)	228,376	92.28
DC Statehood Green	Maude Hills	16,693	6.75
Write-in		2,402	0.97
Total votes		247,471	100.00
Democratic hold			

=== 2010s ===
D.C. At Large Congressional District Election (2010)
Party	Candidate	Votes	%
Democratic	Eleanor Holmes Norton (Incumbent)	117,990	88.94
Republican	Missy Reilly Smith	8,109	6.11
DC Statehood Green	Rick Tingling-Clemmons	4,413	3.33
Write-in		2,144	1.61
Total votes		132,656	100.00
Turnout			29.99
Democratic hold			

D.C. At Large Congressional District Election (2012)
Party	Candidate	Votes	%
Democratic	Eleanor Holmes Norton (Incumbent)	246,664	88.54
Libertarian	Bruce Majors	16,524	5.93
DC Statehood Green	Natale "Lino" Stracuzzi	13,243	4.75
Write-in		2,132	0.78
Total votes		278,563	100.00
Turnout			60.94
Democratic hold			

D.C. At Large Congressional District Election (2014)
Party	Candidate	Votes	%
Democratic	Eleanor Holmes Norton (Incumbent)	143,923	83.73
Republican	Nelson F. Rimensnyder	11,673	6.79
Independent	Timothy J. Krepp	9,101	5.29
DC Statehood Green	Natale "Lino" Stracuzzi	6,073	3.53
Write-in		1,123	0.65
Total votes		171,893	100.00
Turnout			38.45
Democratic hold			

D.C. At Large Congressional District Election (2016)
Party	Candidate	Votes	%
Democratic	Eleanor Holmes Norton (Incumbent)	265,178	84.84
Libertarian	Martin Moulton	18,713	5.99
DC Statehood Green	Natale "Lino" Stracuzzi	14,336	4.59
Write-in		2,679	0.86
Total votes		300,906	100.00
Turnout			65.30
Democratic hold			

D.C. At Large Congressional District Election (2018)
Party	Candidate	Votes	%
Democratic	Eleanor Holmes Norton (Incumbent)	199,124	87.04
Republican	Nelson F. Rimensnyder	9,700	4.24
DC Statehood Green	Natale "Lino" Stracuzzi	8,636	3.77
Independent	John Cheeks	5,509	2.41
Libertarian	Bruce Majors	4,034	1.76
Write-in		1,766	0.77
Total votes		228,769	100.00
Turnout			46.29
Democratic hold			

=== 2020s ===
D.C. At Large Congressional District Election (2020)
Party	Candidate	Votes	%
Democratic	Eleanor Holmes Norton (incumbent)	231,327	86.83
Libertarian	Patrick Hynes	7,525	2.82
Independent	Barbara Washington Franklin	5,969	2.24
Socialist Workers	Omari Musa	5,106	1.92
DC Statehood Green	Natale Lino Stracuzzi	4,463	1.68
Independent	Amir Lowery	4,025	1.51
Independent	David Krucoff	3,817	1.43
Independent	John Cheeks	2,336	0.88
Write-in		1,836	0.69
Total votes		266,404	100.00
Turnout			66.90
Democratic hold			

D.C. At Large Congressional District Election (2022)
Party	Candidate	Votes	%
Democratic	Eleanor Holmes Norton (incumbent)	174,238	86.54
Republican	Nelson Rimensnyder	11,701	5.81
DC Statehood Green	Natale Stracuzzi	9,867	4.90
Libertarian	Bruce Major	4,003	1.99
Write-in		1,521	0.76
Total valid votes		201,330	97.84
Rejected ballots		4,444	2.16
Total votes		205,774	100.00
Turnout			40.76
Democratic hold			

D.C. At Large Congressional District Election (2024)
Party	Candidate	Votes	%
Democratic	Eleanor Holmes Norton (incumbent)	251,540	80.09
DC Statehood Green	Kymone Freeman	21,873	6.96
Republican	Myrtle Patricia Alexander	19,765	6.29
Independent	Michael A. Brown	19,033	6.06
Write-in		1,858	0.59
Total valid votes		314,069	95.63
Rejected ballots		14,335	4.37
Total votes		328,404	100.00
Turnout			70.80
Democratic hold			

== See also ==
- District of Columbia voting rights
- District of Columbia statehood movement
- United States congressional delegations from the District of Columbia
- List of United States congressional districts
