= 2004 United States House of Representatives election in the District of Columbia =

- November 2, 2004
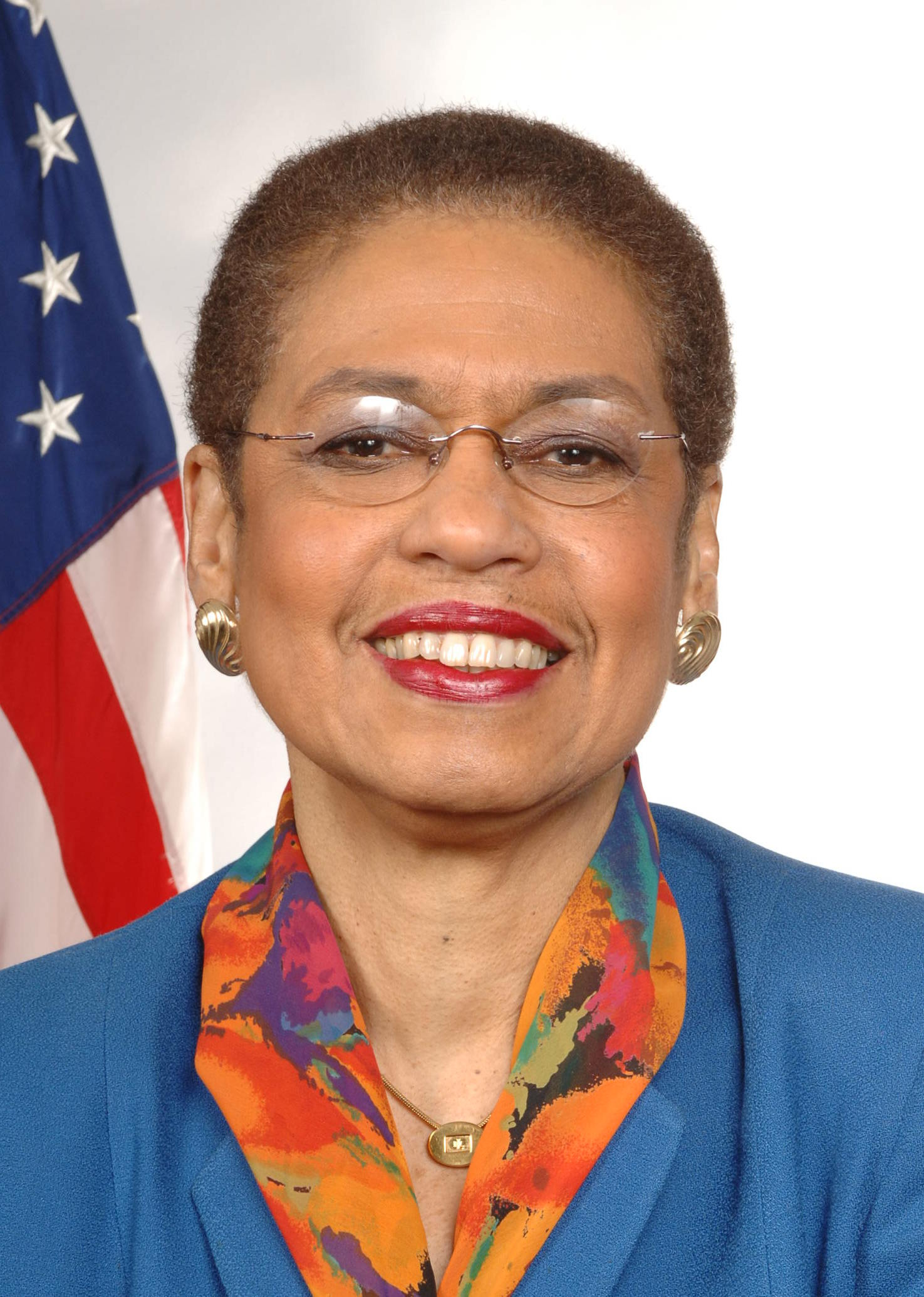

Candidate	Eleanor Holmes Norton	Michael Andrew Monroe
Party	Democratic	Republican
Popular vote	202,027	18,296
Percentage	91.33%	8.27%
- Results by ward: Norton—>90% Norton—80–90%
Delegate before election
Eleanor Holmes Norton
Democratic
Elected Delegate
Eleanor Holmes Norton
Democratic

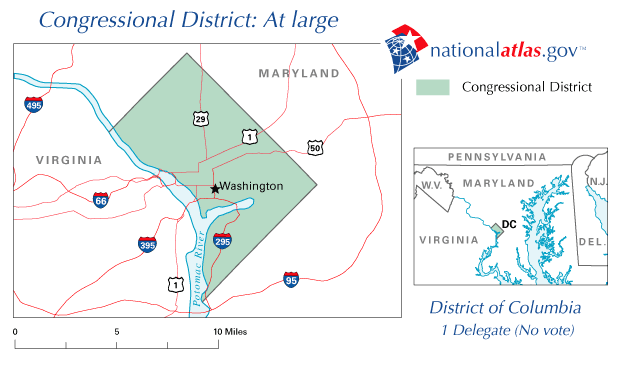
Map of the District of Columbia At-Large district.

On November 2, 2004, the District of Columbia held an election for its non-voting House delegate representing the District of Columbia's at-large congressional district. The winner of the race was incumbent Eleanor Holmes Norton (D).

The delegate is elected for two-year terms. This coincided with the presidential election in 2004.

== Candidates ==
Incumbent Del. Eleanor Holmes Norton, a Democrat, sought re-election for an 8th full term to the United States House of Representatives. Norton was opposed in this election by Republican Party challenger Michael Andrew Monroe who received 8.27%, resulting in Norton being re-elected with 91.33% of the vote.

=== Results ===
D.C. At Large Congressional District Election (2004)
Party	Candidate	Votes	%
Democratic	Eleanor Holmes Norton (inc.)	202,027	91.33
Republican	Michael Andrew Monroe	18,296	8.27
No party	Others	890	0.40
Total votes		221,213	100.00
Turnout			
Democratic hold			

== See also ==
- United States House of Representatives elections in the District of Columbia
