= U.S. Labor Party of the District of Columbia =

- Founded: c. 1974
- Dissolved: c. 1979
- Preceded by: Students for a Democratic Society
- Headquarters: Washington, D.C.
- National affiliation: U.S. Labor Party; National Caucus of Labor Committees
- Colors: Red

The U.S. Labor Party was a political party in the District of Columbia It campaigned for modernization, humanism, and social conservatism. A spin-off of New York-based Students for a Democratic Society, the U.S. Labor Party campaigned for policies that increased economic growth and prosperity and criticized laws and judicial rulings that were socially liberal.

== History ==
=== 1974 election cycle ===
In 1974, the U.S. Labor Party announced that Susan Pennington would run for the District of Columbia's Delegate to Congress.

Pennington was originally from Harrisburg, Pennsylvania, and she was a graduate of Oakland University. Pennington had worked as a newspaper journalist, a press aide, and a lobbyist for the Health and Welfare Council of the District of Columbia.

Pennington was living in Adams Morgan at the time of her candidacy. Pennington said her campaign was against the conspiracy formed by Vice President Nelson Rockefeller, the Central Intelligence Agency, and the "liberal fascists of the Democratic Party". Pennington would not discuss local politics of the District of Columbia because the world was facing another depression similar to the Great Depression. According to Pennington, the only solution was nuclear fusion that would create energy from the ocean water, ending worldwide dependence on oil. Pennington said that Vice President Rockefeller had brainwashed the world into thinking there was an oil shortage and was orchestrating a nuclear war in the Middle East.

Pennington said that the District's most important problems were inadequate housing and inadequate social service programs, both of which could be solved by ending all debt. Pennington said a socialist economy would help elders, and crime would be reduced by abolishing the United States Department of Justice's Law Enforcement Assistance Administration. Pennington said the U.S. Labor Party was the only political party that could solve the world's problems.

The U.S. Labor Party's announced candidate for mayor of the District of Columbia was Gary Turner. Turner did not secure a place on the general election ballot.

Pennington did not win the election, receiving two percent of the total vote.

=== 1975 election cycle ===
In 1975, Pennington ran as the U.S. Labor Party candidate to represent Ward 1 on the District of Columbia Board of Election.

Pennington said she would end drug trafficking in the District's public schools, ban methadone, and start hospital-based drug detoxification programs.

Pennington did not win the election.

=== 1976 election cycle ===
Pennington ran as the U.S. Labor Party candidate for the District's delegate in 1976.

Pennington said that the international monetary system would collapse imminently.

Pennington did not win the election.

Bernard Greene was the U.S. Labor Party candidate for an at-large seat on the Council of the District of Columbia. Greene came in fifth place with three percent of the total vote.

=== 1977 election cycle ===
Pennington ran for an at-large seat on the Council in 1977.

Pennington opposed legalization of marijuana because the President Jimmy Carter's administration was using marijuana to dull people's thoughts and create political apathy so that workers perform their unskilled labor. Pennington advocated for ending taxation until the Council completed an overhaul of the entire government. She said that economic prosperity from industrial development was a better alternative to tax increases. She also wanted the Council to stop repaying the money it had borrowed from the United States Treasury and instead use the money for social service programs. Pennington opposed gun control. On a national level, Pennington thought the United States economy should be entirely reorganized in order to save it.

Stuart Rosenblatt was the U.S. Labor Party candidate for at-large member of the Board of Education. Rosenblatt was serving as the director of the Washington local affairs office of the U.S. Labor Party.

Pennington received 9,252 votes and did not win in the general election, Because the U.S. Labor Party candidate received more than 7,500 votes, the District of Columbia Board of Elections and Ethics deemed the U.S. Labor Party a major party in June 1978. As a major party, the Socialist Workers Party would hold primary elections during each election cycle beginning in 1978 and continuing as long as at least one of their candidates received more than 7,500 votes in each general election.

=== 1978 election cycle ===
1978 was the first year in which the U.S. Labor Party had an official primary election in the District of Columbia. Pennington was the U.S. Labor Party candidate for mayor in 1978.

While focusing her campaign on economic growth, she pointed out the she opposed a commuter tax and a law requiring employees of the District government to live in the District. Pennington claimed that Europe and Japan had formed a new monetary system during a summit and that the United States needed to join it. She advocated for increased enforcement of drug laws, incentives by the government to increase construction, establish high-technology research programs, build a nuclear power plant, improve schools, maintain funding of social service programs, build affordable housing, and enact voter identification laws. She was opposed to energy conservation, gay rights, drug use, and cuts in social service programs because none of them increased economic growth.

Bruce Director ran for chair of the Council. A bank teller, Director said that if Marion Barry and other Democratic candidates won their elections, the District could come under a hideous form of social control not seen since the Roman Empire.

Cloid J. Green ran for the District's delegate. Green worked in a hotel and drove a taxi.

Stuart Rosenblatt ran for at-large member of the Council under the U.S. Labor Party.

Suzanne Klebe was the U.S. Labor Party candidate for the Ward 1 seat on the Council. Klebe was a typesetter at a print shop.

Pennington came in third place with 1,098 votes, or one percent of the total vote. Director came in third place with 2,727 votes, or three percent of the total vote. Green came in fifth place with 1,065 votes, or one percent of the total vote. Rosenblatt came in fifth place with 4,506 votes, or three percent of the total vote. Klebe came in third place with 215 votes, or two percent of the total vote. Because no U.S. Labor Party candidate received more than 7,500 votes in the general election, the U.S. Labor Party lost its major-party status after the 1978 election.

=== 1979 election cycle ===
==== Council election ====
Rosenblatt ran in the special election for an at-large seat on the Council in 1979.

Rosenblatt said that Secretary of Energy James R. Schlesinger was lying about there being an energy crisis. He said that former Secretary of the Treasury W. Michael Blumenthal and current Secretary G. William Miller were lying about there being an economic recession.

Rosenblatt denounced the policies of the United States, United Kingdom, and International Monetary Fund of severely reducing budget deficits because it would create a world depression and start a nuclear war with the Soviet Union. Rosenblatt said that the United States Strategic Air Command's exercises would lead to war. He also warned that President Carter had been given "emergency totalitarian powers".

Rosenblatt said that voters who did not support the U.S. Labor Party have "condemned your family to burn in the thermonuclear war or at best to be squeezed dead in a period of brutal Hitlerian austerity."

Rosenblatt said that implementing significant decreases in interest rates, increased employee wages, and importation of oil from Mexico would guarantee one-hundred years of prosperity and no inflation.

Rosenblatt did not win the special election.

==== Board of Education election ====
In late 1979, Rosenblatt ran for an at-large seat on the Board of Education.

Rosenblatt protested proposed decreases in the public school system's budget. He called for more advanced classes and more vocational classes. He said that elementary school students should be taught how to compose classical music in order to strengthen their cognitive abilities.

Rosenblatt predicted that Mayor of the District of Columbia Marion Barry would severely cut public schools' budgets, leading to poor performance by students, which he would then blame on teachers and principals.

Rosenblatt came in third place with 3,025 votes, or ten percent of the total vote.
