= Socialist Workers Party of the District of Columbia =

- Founded: c. 1970
- Ideology: Trotskyism; Anti-war; Black liberation Women's liberation
- Political position: Far-left
- National affiliation: Socialist Workers Party
- Colors: Red

The Socialist Workers Party of the District of Columbia is a minor political party in the District of Columbia. The party advocates for statehood for the District of Columbia and ending congressional control over the District's laws and finances. The party wants to abolish capitalism and replace it with a socialist economy.

== History ==
=== 1970s ===
==== 1971 election cycle ====
In November 1970, James E. Harris announced he would run for Delegate to the United States House of Representatives as the Socialist Workers Party candidate. Raised in the District, Harris attended Cleveland State University. At the time of his candidacy, he was a resident of Glover Park and worked as an auto mechanic. He protested the Vietnam War as a member of the Student Mobilization Committee, and he was also a member of the Young Socialist Alliance. In Summer 1970, Harris traveled to Cuba to harvest sugar cane as part of the Venceremos Brigade.

Harris' campaign focused on establishing a minimum annual wage, reducing the workweek, prices limits established by trade unions and consumer groups, a 100 percent tax on income in excess of $25,000, and ending the Vietnam War. Harris stressed that communities that whose residents are predominantly Black should be controlled by Black people and that the economy must be democratically planned so that all people benefit not just the wealthy. Harris advocated for preferential hiring of women, free daycare, and free contraception and abortions.

Rep. Richard Ichord of Missouri criticized Harris' campaign while on the floor of the House of Representatives, claiming that the media had not explained the purpose of the Socialist Workers Party and that it had ties with an "international Communist organization". Harris' responded to Ichord's accusations, saying that the Socialist Workers Party does not advocate the violent overthrow of the government. Instead, the Socialist Workers Party wanted a drastic change of the nation's economic system to socialism.

Keith Jones ran for an at-large seat on the District of Columbia Board of Education. Jones was a graduate of Coolidge High School in the District. While in the United States Army, Jones had founded and edited an antiwar publication called Open Sights. As a student at Howard University, Jones was active in the Third World Task Force, a group that had organized an antiwar demonstration in the District. At the time of his candidacy, Jones was living in Dupont Circle. Jones said that the public school system's problems were linked to education funding being siphoned off to pay for the Vietnam War, residents' lack of control over their own neighborhoods, lack of free daycare and free contraceptives, and the government's low priority to educating students of color.

Harris came in sixth place with 431 votes, or less than one percent of the total vote.

Jones came in fourth place with 989 votes, or two percent of the total vote.

==== 1972 election cycle ====
Herman Fagg was the Socialist Workers Party candidate for Delegate to the United States House of Representatives.

Fagg had been a member of the Student Nonviolence Coordinating Committee and the Congress of Racial Equality. Fagg's campaign advocated for nonviolently changing the United States' economy into that of socialism. He also campaigned for racial equality, women's equality, and an end to war.

Fagg came in fifth place with 1,133 votes, or one percent of the total vote.

==== 1973 election cycle ====
Omari Musa was the Socialist Workers Party candidates for at-large seat on the District of Columbia Board of Education. Musa had previously run for Delegate in 1972 under the name Herman Fagg. At the time of his campaign, Musa was an ironworker living in Dupont Circle. Musa opposed the District of Columbia Home Rule Act, calling it "a fraud and a sellout". Musa said that District residents should be able to vote on statehood instead. Musa advocated for the District to have more control over its own educational system and a District-wide conference on students' rights. Musa opposed having armed guards in the District's schools.

Erich Martel was also a Social Workers Party candidate for an at-large seat on the Board of Education. A resident of Adams Morgan, Martel worked as a teacher at Cardozo High School. Martel said that District students should be told that their education will only prepare them for low-paying jobs.

Nan Bailey was the Socialist Workers Party candidate for the Ward 2 seat on the Board of Education. Born in Fort Monroe, Virginia, Bailey was raised in many different places around the world as her father was transferred to different Army bases. She received a scholarship to attend St. Timothy's School in Catonsville, Maryland, where she was the first African-American student. Bailey had attended Brown University where she studied Afro-American Studies and joined the Young Socialist Alliance. She worked as a secretary. Bailey worked as a secretary and lived in Dupont Circle. Bailey said that the students' lack of discipline is actually a rebellion against a school system that prepares students for low-paying employment.

James Harris was the Socialist Workers Party candidate for the Ward 3 seat on the Board of Education. A resident of Glover Park, Harris worked as a clerk for the Library of Congress.

Musa came in eighth place with 39 votes, or one percent of the total vote. Martel came in seventh place with 606 votes, or two percent of the total vote. Bailey came in fifth place with 40 votes, or three percent of the total vote. Harris came in fourth place with 130 votes, or three percent of the total vote.

==== 1974 election cycle ====
Toba Singer was the Socialist Workers Party candidate for Delegate to the House. Singer ran as a write-in candidate. Originally from New York City, Singer had graduated from the University of Massachusetts. She had organized a civil rights boycott of New York City Public Schools in 1964. She was an activist with the Women's National Abortion Rights Coalition. At the time of her candidacy, Singer was a graduate student at the University of Maryland studying library science, and she had lived in the District for three years. Singer said the Democratic Party was a racist political party because it was the party of Georgia Governor Lester Maddox and Alabama Governor George Wallace. Singer said that the Metropolitan Police Department should cease to exist because it does not prevent crime; it should be replaced with civilian review boards.

Nan Bailey was the Socialist Workers Party candidate for mayor of the District of Columbia. Bailey advocated for a minimum wage of five dollars per hour and zero tax on income less than $15,000. She proposed a 100% tax on individual income in excess of $30,000 and a 100% tax on the profits of companies that pollute. She said that employees should be paid for forty hours of work while actually working thirty hours. Bailey proposed free public transportation and limiting rent to ten percent of a tenant's income. Bailey wanted to disband the Metropolitan Police Department. Bailey was critical of the District of Columbia Home Rule Act because it kept the District under the control of Congress, which she said was racist, and was an inferior alternative to statehood for the District of Columbia.

Allan Budka was the Socialist Workers Party candidate for chair of the Council of the District of Columbia. Originally from Lorain, Ohio, Budka had attended Case Western University where he was a part of the Young Socialist Alliance. Budka had moved to the District two years prior to his candidacy, and he was an ironworker who worked in construction.

Anne Powers was a Socialist Workers Party candidate for an at-large seat on the Council. Powers worked as a teacher at Wheatley Elementary School in Trinidad.

Sara Smith was also a Socialist Workers Party candidate for an at-large seat on the Council. Smith was a student at George Washington University, and she led the school's Young Socialists Alliance.

Budka came in third place with three percent of the total vote.

Powers came in thirteenth place with 5,650 votes, or two percent of the total vote.

Smith came in fourteenth place with 4,970 votes, or two percent of the total vote.

Singer and Bailey did not win the elections in which they each ran.

==== 1976 election cycle ====
Dorothy Hawkinson ran as a Socialist Workers Party candidate for an at-large seat on the Council in 1976. Living on Scott Circle, she worked for the National Association of Social Workers. Hawkinson's campaign emphasized reducing the unemployment rate; establishing a federal program to build schools, housing, and hospitals; levying property taxes on federal buildings; and reducing the workweek without reducing workers' pay. Hawkinson said that 75 percent of the District's housing is substandard. She said that tenants living in substandard housing should not have to pay rent, and the Council should prohibit landlords from raising all other tenants' rents.

Hawkins came in fifth place, receiving 10,256 votes in the general election. Because Hawkins received more than 7,500 votes, the District of Columbia Board of Elections and Ethics deemed the Socialist Workers Party a major party in June 1978. As a major party, the Socialist Workers Party would hold primary elections during each election cycle beginning in 1978 and continuing as long as at least one of their candidates received more than 7,500 votes in each general election.

==== 1977 election cycle ====
Afroditta Constantinidis was the Socialist Workers Party's candidate for an at-large seat on the Board of Education. Constantinidis was a graduate of Federal City College. She was a teacher who, at the time of her candidacy, was temporarily working as a dispatcher for an air freight company.

Constantinidis said that the goal of the incumbent members of the Board of Education was to please white business owners rather than help their constituents. Constantinidis advocated for more funding of schools in neighborhoods predominantly with black residents. She wanted to cut funding for school police officers, school guards, and truant officers. She said the school curriculum should include information about the oppression of workers and people of color.

Constantinidis did not win the primary election.

==== 1978 election cycle ====
Antonio J. Grillo ran to represent Ward 1 on the Council in 1978. He was unopposed in the Socialist Workers Party primary election. A resident of Mount Pleasant, Grillo worked as a clerk.

Grillo advocated for abolishing property tax on the homes of families and retired senior citizens. Grillo said that the government should seize all abandoned residential buildings and sell them to people with low incomes. Grillo said that workweeks should be reduced to thirty hours per week with no reduction in salary. He supported limiting rent increases to ten percent per year.

According to Grillo, the incumbent Democrats on the Council were following the will of the Board of Trade and D.C. Chamber of Commerce rather than the will of the people. Grillo's campaign focused on exposing political corruption, collecting delinquent business property taxes, and reforming rent laws. Grillo was in favor the hiring of undocumented workers and increasing payments to people who are unemployed.

Grillo came in fourth place with 211 votes, or two percent of the total vote.

With no candidate receiving more than 7,500 votes in the 1978 general election, the Socialist Workers Party returned to minor-party status.

=== 1980s ===
==== 1980 election cycle ====
Glenn B. White ran as a Socialist Workers Party candidate for an at-large seat on the Council. A resident of Edgewood and a track worker for the Metrorail system, White advocated dramatically increasing taxes on businesses and an income tax rate of 100 percent on income exceeding $50,000. He campaigned for the federal government to give more money to help the District. White supported more government-provided training programs for residents.

White came in seventh place with 2,893 votes, or one percent of the total vote.

==== 1982 election cycle ====
Glenn B. White ran again as a Socialist Workers Party candidate, running for Mayor in 1982.

White wanted the District government to employ people without jobs to make improvements to the District. He said that it was absurd that the District could not find the money to do so even though incumbent Mayor Marion Barry was able to raise $1.2 million for his mayoral campaign. On the matter of statehood for the District of Columbia, White said it was largely irrelevant because the city would still be controlled by large corporations, which use the Democratic and Republican parties as tools.

White came in fourth place with 1,445 votes, or one percent of the total vote.

==== 1986 election cycle ====
Deborah Lazar was the Socialist Workers Party candidate for mayor in 1986. Lazar worked an engine attendant trainee for Amtrak. Lazar's campaign opposed the United States involvement in Nicaragua and advocated that the United States should cut ties with South Africa.

Lazar came in sixth place with 469 votes, or less than one percent of the total vote.

=== 1990s ===
==== 1990 election cycle ====
Ike Nahem was the Socialist Workers Party candidate for mayor in 1990. A resident of Adams Morgan, Nahem worked as a locomotive engineer for Amtrak. He had graduated from Indiana University with a bachelor's degree in political science. He had helped the National Organization for Women secure access to abortion clinics, had co-founded the Washington Area Labor Committee on Central America and the Caribbean, and was the incumbent chair of the District of Columbia Socialist Workers Party at the time of his candidacy.

Nahem said that Democratic and Republican politicians both used budget crises to harm education, housing, health care, job training, and drug treatment. He called for an increase in services for individuals who are homeless and individuals with addictions. Nahem called the District's public schools "miserable" and "segregated". Nahem called for increasing taxes on wealthy individuals in order to fund increased help for working people. Nahem said the Socialist Workers Party could unite people of all races, genders, and ages.

Sam Manuel was the Socialist Workers Party candidate for shadow senator. A resident of Brightwood, Manuel worked as a brakeman. he had attended Georgia State University, where he had been president of the Black Students Union.

Manuel disagreed with the premise that the District of Columbia would achieve statehood by lobbying Congress. Instead, he said that statehood would be achieved through direct political action by the residents themselves. Manuel equated it to strikes and picket lines that had led to legislation granting workers the right to join labor unions. Manuel equated the District's status as being similar to a Bantustan of apartheid-era South Africa. If elected, Manuel said he would organize people to action on statehood.

Nahem came in tenth place, receiving 177 votes, or less than one percent of the total vote.

Manuel came in tenth place with 2,765 votes, or one percent of the total vote.

==== 1992 election cycle ====
Sam Manuel ran for delegate to the House of Representatives as a Socialist Workers Party candidate in 1992. Manual had run for Shadow Senator in 1990.

Manuel came in fourth place with 1,840 votes, or one percent of the total vote.

==== 1993 election cycle ====
Emily Fitzsimmons was the Socialist Workers Party candidate for chair of the Council in 1993. At the time of her candidacy, Fitzsimmon cleaned airplanes for United Airlines.

When asked about what should be done to reduce violent crime in the District, Fitzsimmons said that the capitalist system is the source of violence in the community because it forces workers to compete against each other for wages. She said that the solution to violence is to change the economic system to one where human needs are put ahead of corporate profits. On the subject of improving schools in the District, Fitzsimmons said that "capitalist rulers of this country" reduced school budgets in order to decrease wages and shift the burden of economic decline on workers. She advocated for increased educational funding by the District and federal governments and additional bilingual classes. She called for classes about the history of the working-class movement, sociology, and the history of the struggle for equality by minorities. Regarding public housing and homelessness, Fitzsimmons said the lack of housing for people was the fault of the Democratic and Republican politicians and the Council of the District of Columbia. She called for working people and youths to rally for immediate relief from the lack of affordable housing. She advocated for an end to segregated housing. She wanted public works programs to build and repair public housing and a law to limit rent to ten percent of a tenant's income. When asked about the District of Columbia's five-billion-dollar unfunded pension liability, Fitzsimmons said the federal and District governments should fund pensions through a tax on the wealthy.

Fitzsimmons came in fifth place with 542 votes, or 1.56% of the total vote.

==== 1994 election cycle ====
Bradley Downs ran for Delegate to the House of Representatives as a Socialist Workers Party candidate in 1994. A graduate of the University of Maryland, Downs worked as an aircraft cleaner for USAir as the time of his candidacy.

Downs promised to fight against layoffs and social service cuts. He claimed that incumbent Delegate Eleanor Holmes Norton had voted in favor of a $140 million decrease in the District's budget. Downs advocated for a 30-hour workweek for 40 hours of pay in order to reduce unemployment.

According to Downs, the United States and all other foreign military should withdraw from Haiti immediately because they were only in Haiti in order to allow corporations to profit from the low wages of the impoverished Haitians. Instead, Haitian refugees should be allowed to settle in the United States.

Downs said that federal troops needed to be deployed to protect women and doctors from violent attacks caused by the politics of the Democratic and Republican parties.

Aaron Ruby was the Socialist Workers Party candidate for mayor. Prior to his candidacy, Ruby had been a member of the Young Socialist Alliance, with whom he had protested the Persian Gulf War in 1991.

Downs came in fourth place with 1,486 votes, or one percent of the total vote.

Ruby came in sixth place with 423 votes, or less than one percent of the total vote.

==== 1996 election cycle ====
Sam Manuel was the Socialist Workers Party candidate for delegate to the House of Representatives in 1996. Manuel had run for shadow senator in 1990 and for delegate to the House of Representatives as a Socialist Workers Party candidate in 1992.

Manuel supported statehood for the District of Columbia and abolishing the District of Columbia Financial Control Board. Manuel was in favor of affirmative action, immigrants' rights, abortion rights, and farmers' rights. Manuel wanted the United States to end its economic embargo of Cuba.

Manuel came in fourth place, receiving 1,146 votes or one percent of the total vote.

==== 1997 election cycle ====
Mary Martin was the Socialist Workers Party candidate for chair of the Council. Martin was the only candidate on the ballot running against incumbent Council Chair Linda W. Cropp.

Originally from Savannah, Georgia, Martin had attended Georgia State University where she studied political science and counseling. A resident of Mount Pleasant, Martin worked in ground operations at National Airport.

According to Martin, crime was committed by those who have no way to sustain themselves due to the competitive capitalist economic system. Martin believed the only way to truly improve people's lives was to fight for dramatic economic change, not passing government legislation. She believed most of the major societal changes of the twentieth century were a direct result of mass movements, citing the rise of labor unions, civil rights movement, women's rights movement, and the gays rights movement.

Martin said that the District of Columbia Financial Control Board should be abolished and that the District of Columbia should be a state. She was opposed to school closures and decreases to the budget of the University of the District of Columbia.

Democrat Linda W. Cropp won the election, and Martin came in second place, receiving 1,459 votes or eight percent of the total vote.

Because Cropp won the election for chair of the Council, her at-large seat became vacant and there was a subsequent special election to fill the vacancy. Martin declared her candidacy to run for the vacant seat.

Martin's campaign focused on police brutality in New York City and of the U.S. policy toward Iraq.

Martin came in fourth place with 464 votes, or two percent of the total vote.

==== 1998 election cycle ====
Mary Martin ran for delegate to the House of Representatives in 1998. She had run for chair of the council in early 1997, and she ran for an at-large seat on the Council in late 1997.

Martin advocated for higher taxes on wealthy individuals by way of a steeply progressive income tax without exceptions. Martin wanted to increase the impact of affirmative action. She was in favor of immigrants' rights, ending deportations, and allowing the free movement of people across borders. Martin supported canceling the debt of developing countries. Martin was in favor of a united Ireland and independence for Puerto Rico.

Sam Manuel was the Socialist Workers candidate for mayor in 1998.

Manuel was opposed to the District government paying for the public or private school tuition of a parent's choice. He said such a policy was part of a national effort to undermine public schools.

Manuel said that poor public school conditions were fault of large cuts to school funding, attacks on teachers' unions, and violations of students' rights, and not the fault of violent students and poor teachers. He said that many of the District's public schools were identical to prisons.

Martin came in fifth place with 1,087 votes, one percent of the total vote.

Manuel came in seventh place with 330 votes, or less than one percent of the total vote.

=== 2000s ===
==== 2000 election cycle ====
Sam Manuel ran for Delegate to Congress in 2000. Manuel had been the Socialist Workers candidate for shadow senator in 1990, Delegate in 1992 and 1996, and mayor in 1998.

Manuel said that capitalism was the District's most urgent problem. Manuel said that capitalism caused a crisis for working people including unemployment, police brutality, social service cuts, and union busting.

Manuel came in fourth place with 1,419 votes, or one percent of the total vote.

==== 2002 election cycle ====
Sam Manuel ran for mayor in 2002, his sixth campaign in the District.

Manuel came in fifth place with 702 votes, one percent of the total vote.

==== 2010 election cycle ====
Omari Musa was the Socialist Workers candidate for mayor in 2010. Musa had been the Socialist Workers Party candidate for Delegate in 1972 and at-large member on the Board of Education in 1973.

Musa campaigned for a public works program that would provide jobs at union rates. He criticized the Democratic and Republican parties as being the parties of the powerful and the wealthy. Musa called for a revolutionary movement where the workers would take the power from billionaires and create a society based on equality and human solidarity.

Musa receiving 717 votes, or one percent of the total vote.

== See also ==
- Socialist Workers Party (United States)
