= Eleanor Holmes Norton =

American politician and lawyer (born 1937)

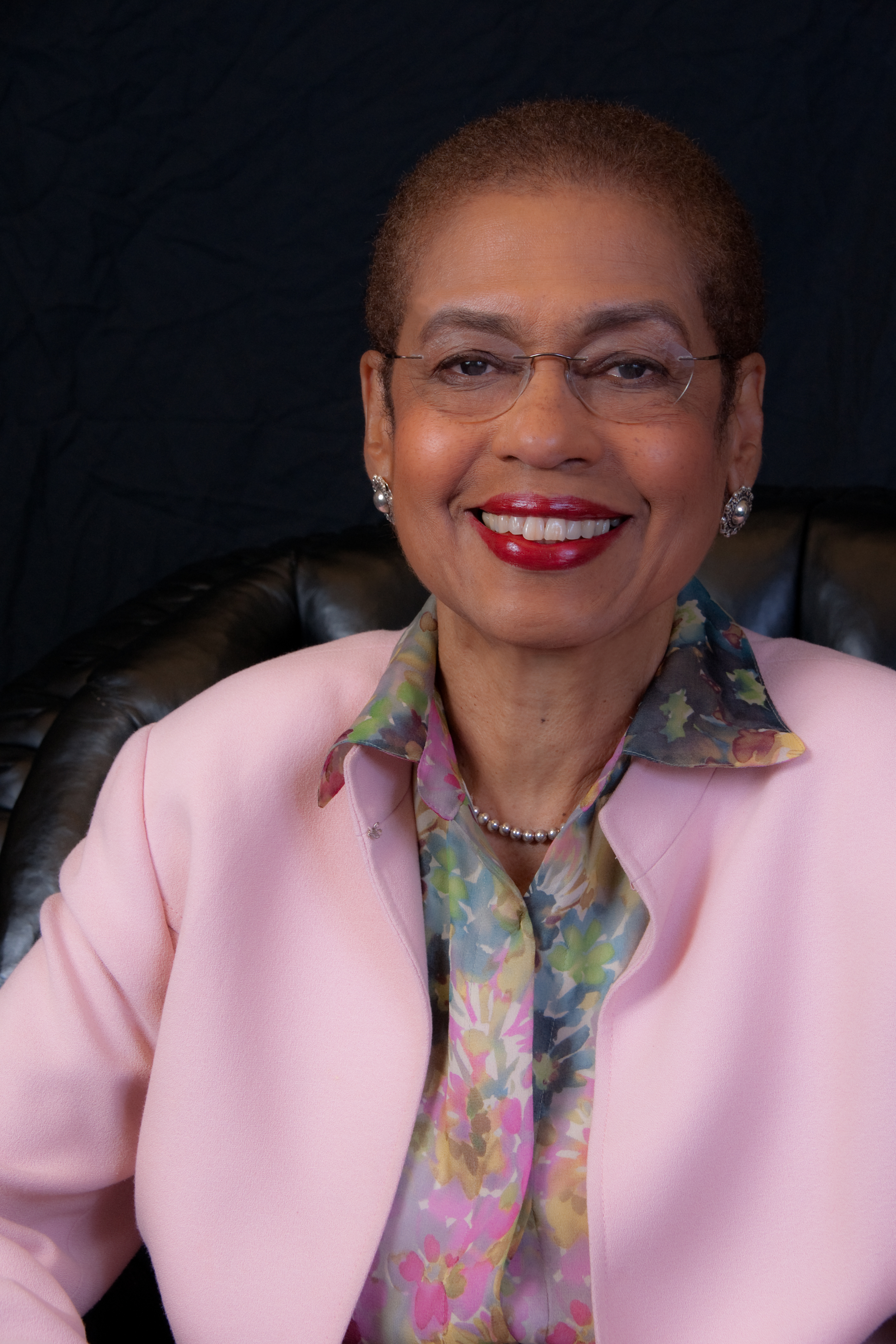
- Official portrait, 2010

Delegate to the U.S. House of Representatives from the District of Columbia's at-large district
- Incumbent
- Assumed office January 3, 1991
- Preceded by: Walter Fauntroy

Chair of the Equal Employment Opportunity Commission
- In office May 27, 1977 – February 21, 1981
- President: Jimmy Carter; Ronald Reagan
- Preceded by: Lowell W. Perry
- Succeeded by: Clarence Thomas

Personal details
- Born: Eleanor Katherine Holmes; June 13, 1937 (age 89) Washington, D.C., U.S.
- Party: Democratic
- Spouse: Edward Norton (m. 1965; div. 1993)
- Children: 2
- Education: Antioch College (BA); Yale University (MA, LLB)
- Website: House website Campaign website
- Norton's voice Norton supporting D.C. Statehood. Recorded August 22, 2021

Eleanor Katherine Holmes Norton (née Holmes; born June 13, 1937) is an American politician, lawyer, and human rights activist. Norton is a congressional delegate to the U.S. House of Representatives, where she has represented the District of Columbia since 1991 as a member of the Democratic Party. She is serving her eighteenth term in the United States House of Representatives.

Prior to serving in Congress, Norton organized for Student Nonviolent Coordinating Committee during the civil rights movement. From 1977 to 1981, she was the first female chair of the Equal Employment Opportunity Commission.

Norton did not seek re-election to the House of Representatives in 2026.

== Early life and education ==
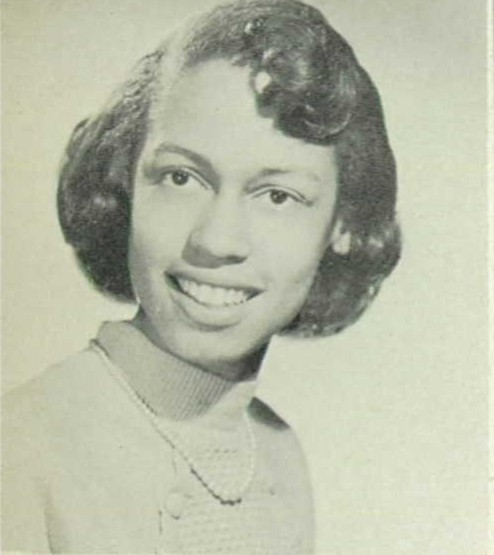
Holmes in 1955

Norton was born in Washington, D.C., the daughter of Vela (née Lynch), a schoolteacher, and Coleman Holmes, a civil servant. She attended Dunbar High School—a school famous for educating black children—as a member of its last segregated class. She was elected the junior class president and graduated as a member of the National Honor Society. After high school, she attended Antioch College, graduating with a Bachelor of Arts in 1960, then Yale University, where she received a Master of Arts in American studies in 1963, then graduated with a Bachelor of Laws from Yale Law School in 1964.

While in college and graduate school, Norton was active in the civil rights movement and an organizer for the Student Nonviolent Coordinating Committee (SNCC). By the time she graduated from Antioch, she had already been arrested for organizing and participating in sit-ins in Washington, D.C., Maryland, and Ohio. While in law school, she traveled to Mississippi for the Mississippi Freedom Summer and worked with civil rights stalwarts such as Medgar Evers. Her first encounter with a recently released but physically beaten Fannie Lou Hamer forced her to bear witness to the intensity of violence and Jim Crow repression in the South.

Norton's time in the SNCC inspired her lifelong commitment to social activism and feminism. She contributed the piece "For Sadie and Maud" to the 1970 anthology Sisterhood is Powerful: An Anthology of Writings From The Women's Liberation Movement, edited by Robin Morgan. Norton was on the founding advisory board of the Women's Rights Law Reporter (founded 1970), the first legal periodical in the United States to focus exclusively on the field of women's rights law. In the early 1970s, Norton was a signer of the Black Woman's Manifesto, a classic document of the Black feminist movement.

== Career before Congress ==
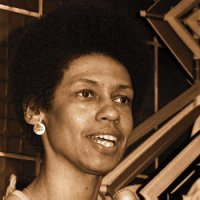
Eleanor Holmes Norton as chair of the EEOC

Upon graduation from law school, she worked as a law clerk to Federal District Court Judge A. Leon Higginbotham Jr. In 1965, she became the assistant legal director of the American Civil Liberties Union, a position she held until 1970. In 1970, Norton represented sixty female employees of Newsweek who had filed a claim with the Equal Employment Opportunity Commission (EEOC) that Newsweek had a policy of allowing only men to be reporters. The women won, and Newsweek agreed to allow women to be reporters.

Norton specialized in freedom of speech cases, and her work included successfully arguing Carroll v. President & Commissioners of Princess Anne, a Supreme Court case brought on behalf of the white supremacist National States' Rights Party. She put this victory into perspective in an interview with one of the District of Columbia Bar's website editors: "I defended the First Amendment, and you seldom get to defend the First Amendment by defending people you like ... You don't know whether the First Amendment is alive and well until it is tested by people with despicable ideas. And I loved the idea of looking a racist in the face—remember this was a time when racism was much more alive and well than it is today—and saying, 'I am your lawyer, sir, what are you going to do about that?'" She worked as an adjunct assistant professor at New York University Law School from 1970 to 1971. In 1970, Mayor John Lindsay appointed her as the head of the New York City Human Rights Commission, and she held the first hearings in the country on discrimination against women. Prominent feminists from throughout the country came to New York City to testify, while Norton used the platform as a means of raising public awareness about the application of the Civil Rights Act of 1964 to women and sex discrimination.

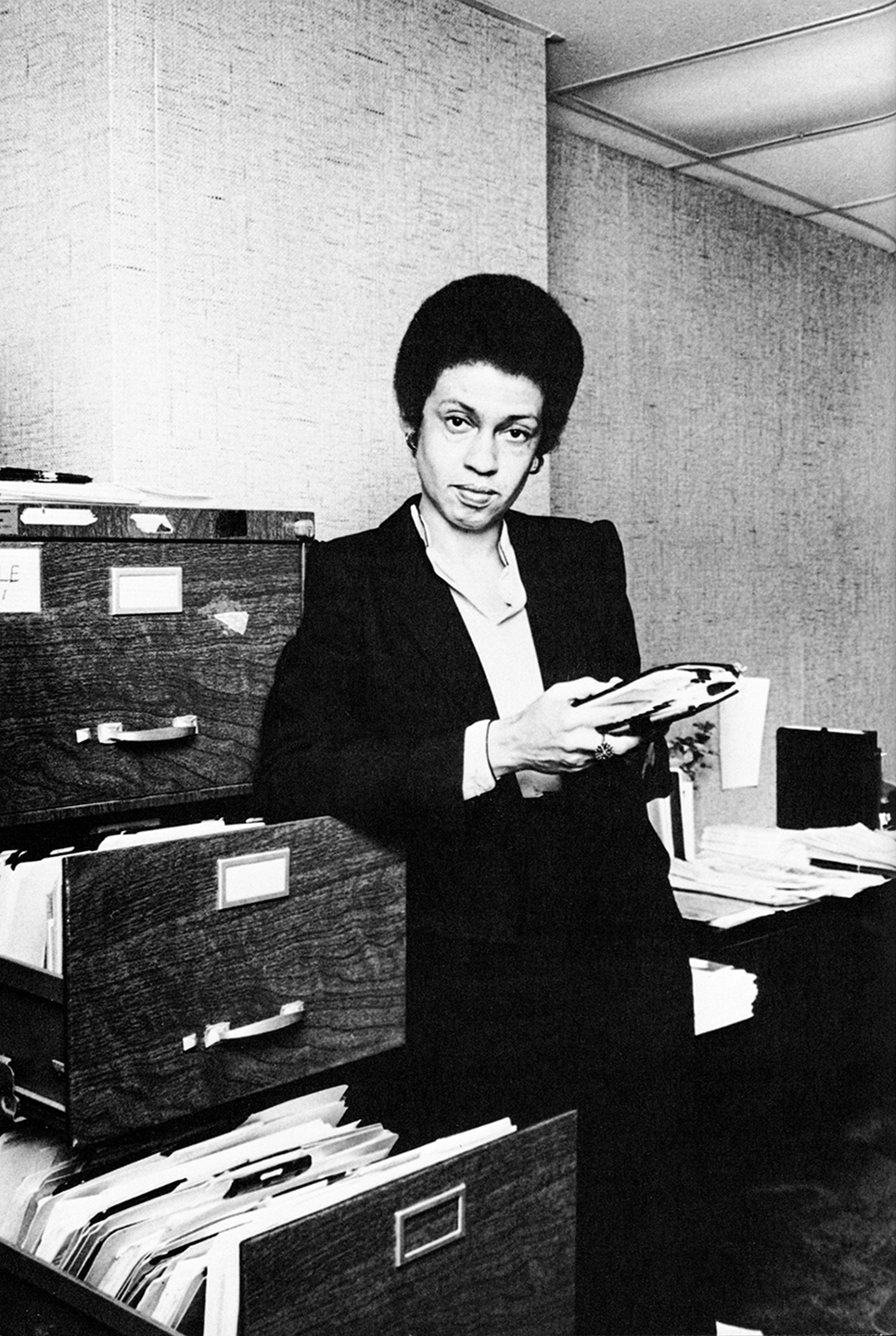
Eleanor Holmes Norton photographed by Lynn Gilbert

President Jimmy Carter appointed Norton as the chair of the EEOC in 1977; she became the first female head of the agency. Norton released the EEOC's first set of regulations outlining what constituted sexual harassment and declaring that sexual harassment was indeed a form of sexual discrimination that violated federal civil rights laws.

She has also served as a senior fellow of the Urban Institute. Norton became a professor at Georgetown University Law Center in 1982. During this time, she was a vocal anti-apartheid activist in the U.S., and was a part of the Free South Africa Movement.

In 1990, Norton, along with 15 other African American women and one man, formed African-American Women for Reproductive Freedom.

She contributed the piece "Notes of a Feminist Long Distance Runner" to the 2003 anthology Sisterhood Is Forever: The Women's Anthology for a New Millennium, edited by Robin Morgan.

She received a Foremother Award for her lifetime of accomplishments from the National Research Center for Women & Families in 2011.

== Delegate to Congress ==
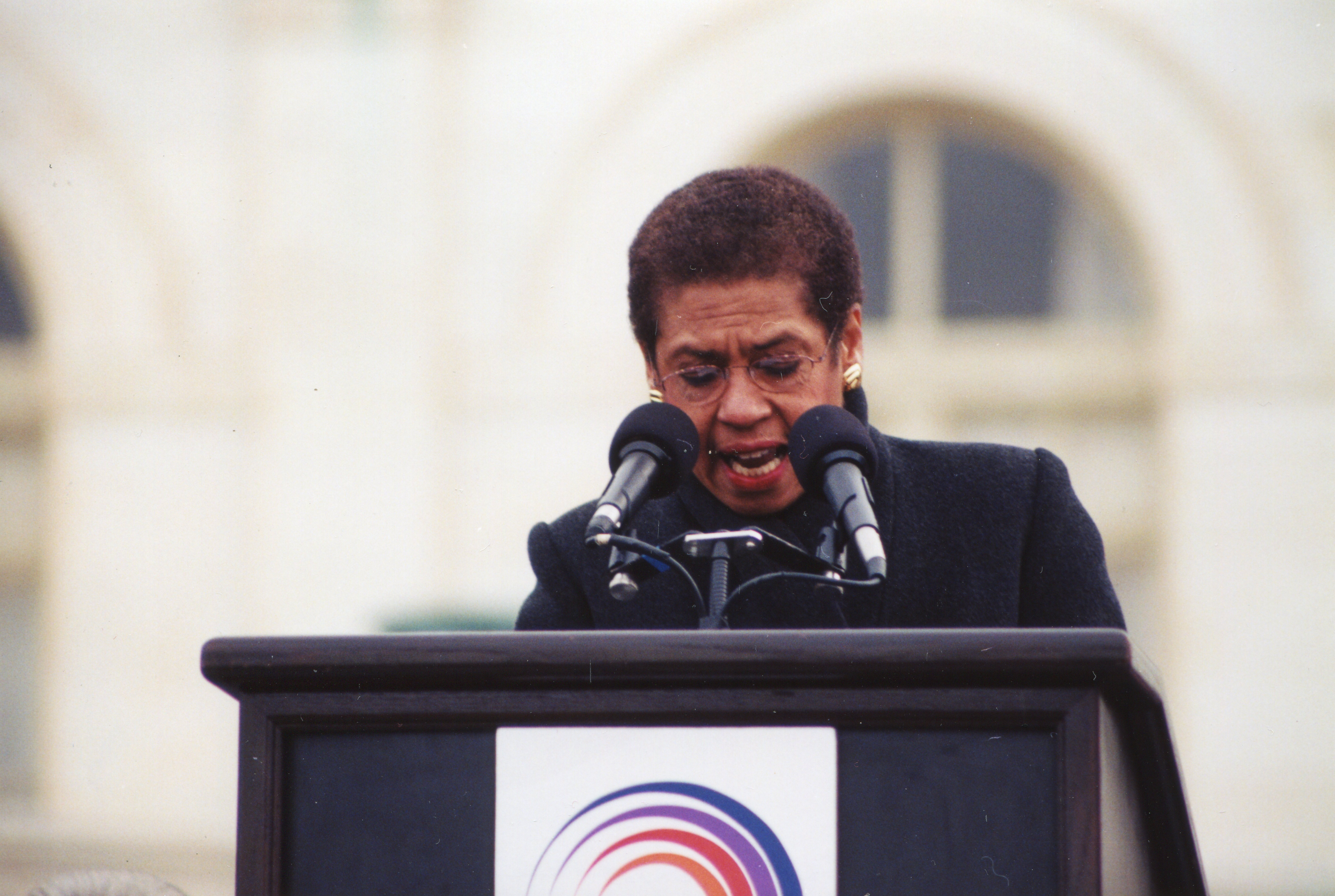
Norton speaking at a 1998 rally against the impeachment of Bill Clinton

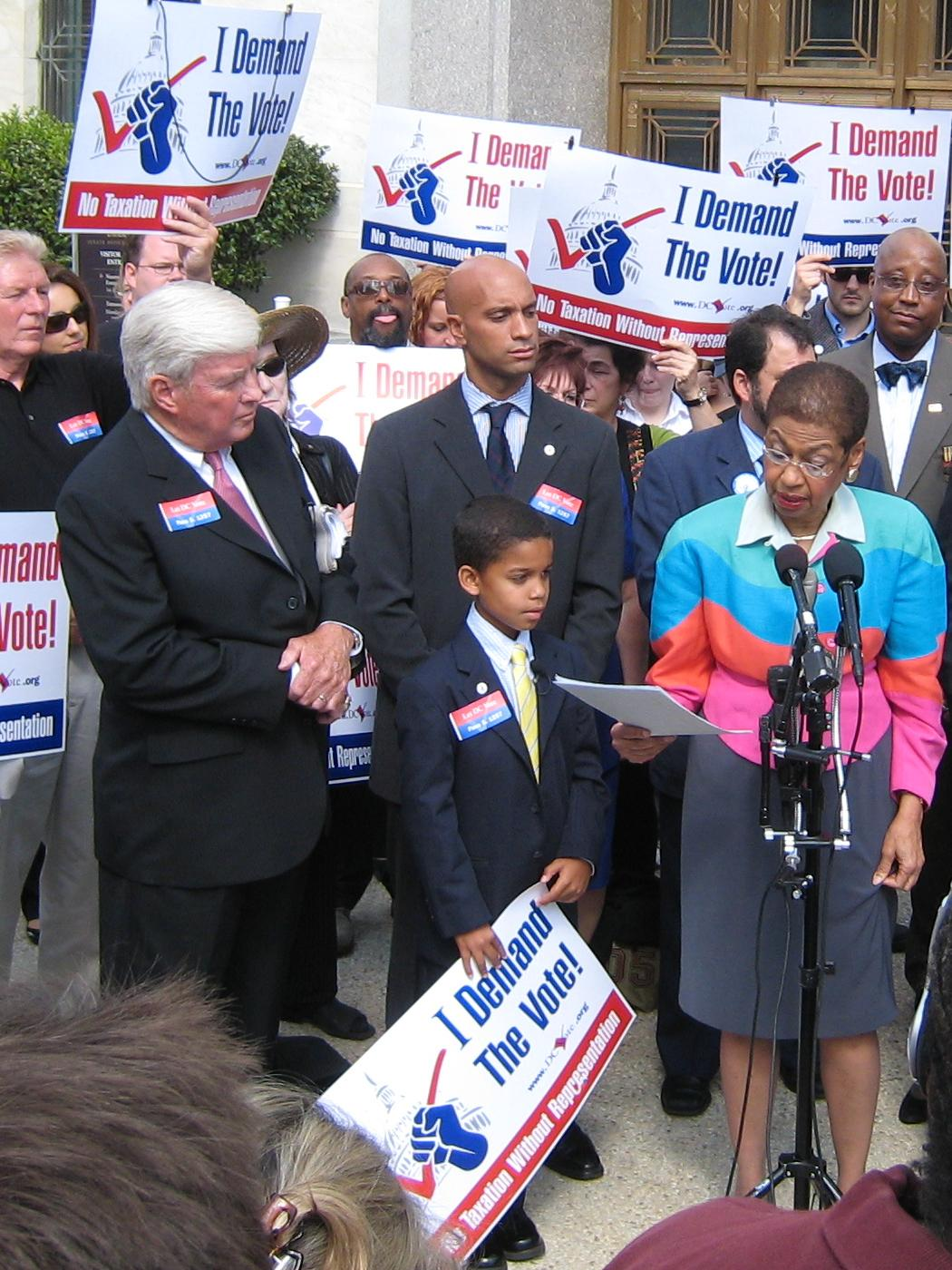
Jack Kemp, Adrian Fenty, and Norton at D.C. Vote rally on Capitol Hill, 2007

Norton was elected in 1990 as a Democratic delegate to the House of Representatives. She defeated city council member Betty Ann Kane in the primary despite the last-minute revelation that Norton and her husband, both lawyers, had failed to file D.C. income tax returns between 1982 and 1989. The Nortons paid over $80,000 in back taxes and fines. Her campaign manager was Donna Brazile. The delegate position was open because Del. Walter Fauntroy was running for mayor rather than seeking reelection. Norton received 39 percent of the vote in the Democratic primary election, and 59 percent of the vote in the general election. Norton took office on January 3, 1991, and has been reelected every two years since.

Delegates to Congress are entitled to sit in the House of Representatives and vote in committee, and to offer amendments in the Committee of the Whole, but are not allowed to take part in legislative floor votes. The district and four U.S. territories—Guam, American Samoa, the Northern Mariana Islands, and the U.S. Virgin Islands—send delegates to Congress; the Resident Commissioner of Puerto Rico has the same rights as delegates.

William Thomas and the White House Peace Vigil inspired Norton to introduce the Nuclear Disarmament and Economic Conversion Act, which would require the United States to disable and dismantle its nuclear weapons at such time as all other nations possessing nuclear weapons do likewise. Norton has been introducing a version of the bill since 1994.

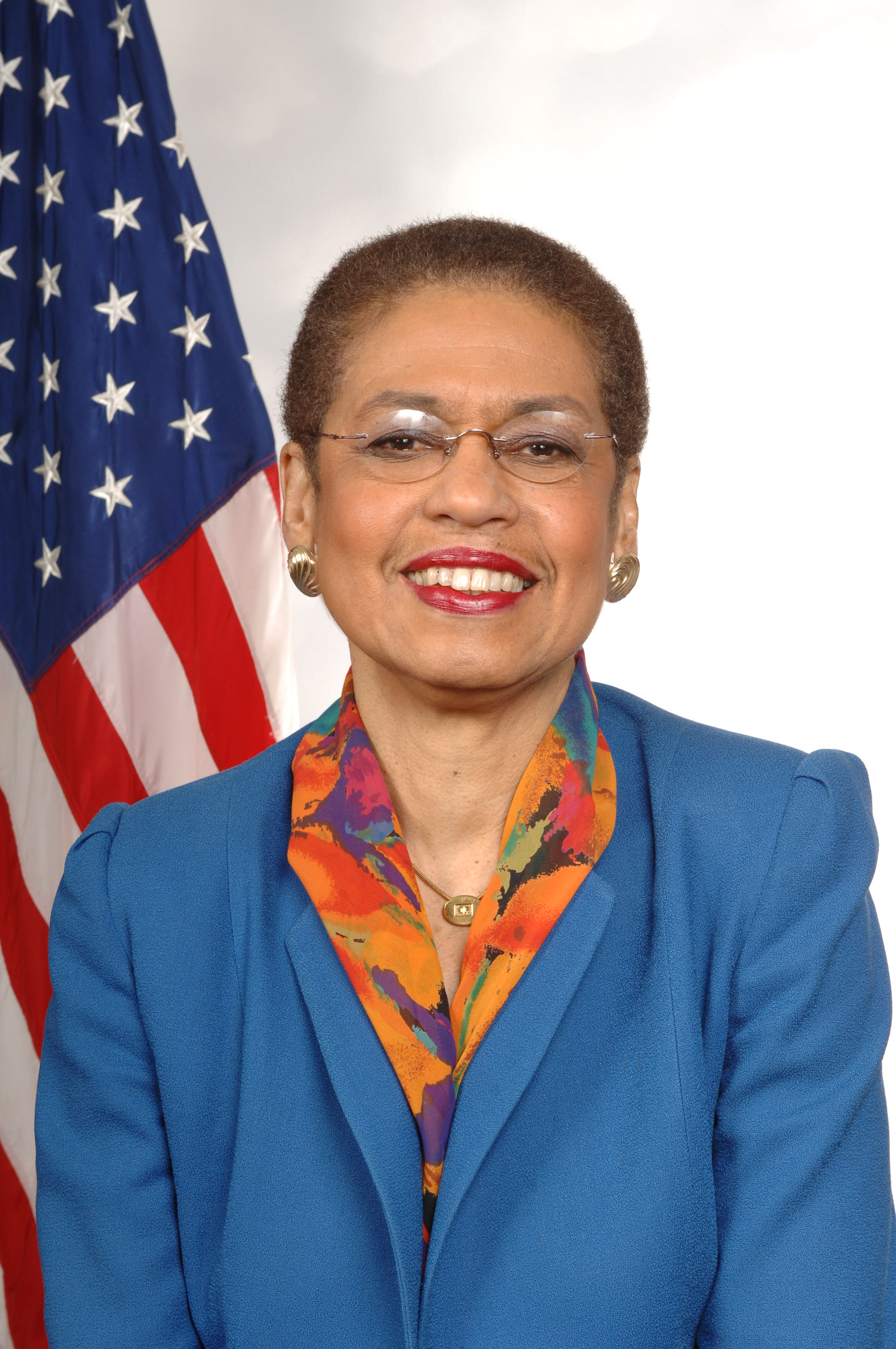
Norton in 2006

Legislation strongly supported by Norton that would grant the District of Columbia a voting representative in the House, the District of Columbia House Voting Rights Act of 2009, was passed by the United States Senate on February 26, 2009. However, the legislation stalled in the House and failed to pass prior to the end of the 111th Congress.

The legislation proposed in 2009 did not grant Norton the right to vote in the 111th Congress, as she would have had to remain in her elected office of delegate for the duration of her two-year term.

In September 2010, the national press criticized Norton after the release of a voice message in which she solicited campaign funds from a lobbyist representing a project that she oversaw. Norton countered that the message was typical of appeals made by all members of Congress and that the call was made from campaign offices not paid for by taxpayers. In March 2012, the public radio series This American Life featured the voicemail message at the start of a program on lobbying titled "Take the Money and Run for Office".

In May 2012, Norton was blocked from testifying on an anti-abortion bill in her district—the second time she has been blocked from speaking about abortion. She insisted that it was a denial of a common courtesy. Representative Jerrold Nadler supported Norton's protest, saying "Never in my 20 years as a member of Congress have I seen a colleague treated so contemptuously."

In August 2014, after the D.C. Board of Elections voted to put a question about marijuana legalization on the ballot in November 2014, Norton vowed to defend against any congressional attempt to stop the district from voting on the issue and to, if approved, fight any attempt to prevent implementation.

She has been a member of the Congressional Progressive Caucus and the Congressional Black Caucus.

In June 2025, some colleagues and D.C. officials questioned Norton's ability to carry out her duties, citing a noticeable decline in her public activity and increased reliance on aides. Norton, the oldest member of the House, initially said she would seek a nineteenth term but later stated she was "still considering [her] options" for the 2026 election.

In late January 2026, Norton's campaign office announced that she will not seek re-election to the House of Representatives in 2026.

=== Committee assignments ===
- Committee on Oversight and Accountability
  - Subcommittee on Economic Growth, Energy Policy and Regulatory Affairs
  - Subcommittee on Government Operations and the Federal Workforce
- Committee on Transportation and Infrastructure
  - Subcommittee on Aviation
  - Subcommittee on Economic Development, Public Buildings and Emergency Management
  - Subcommittee on Highways and Transit (Ranking Member)
  - Subcommittee on Water Resources and Environment

=== Caucus memberships ===
- Black Maternal Health Caucus
- Congressional Progressive Caucus
- Congressional Black Caucus
- Congressional Caucus for the Equal Rights Amendment
- House Baltic Caucus
- Congressional Arts Caucus
- Congressional Freethought Caucus
- Climate Solutions Caucus
- Congressional Solar Caucus
- Congressional Ukraine Caucus
- U.S.-Japan Caucus
- Medicare for All Caucus
- Blue Collar Caucus
- Congressional Coalition on Adoption
- Rare Disease Caucus
- Congressional Caucus on Turkey and Turkish Americans

=== Legislation sponsored ===
- On July 8, 2013, Norton sponsored H.R. 2611 (An act to designate the Douglas A. Munro Coast Guard Headquarters Building (H.R. 2611; 113th Congress)) to name the new Coast Guard headquarters after Munro, the United States Coast Guard's only Medal of Honor recipient.
- On October 28, 2013, Norton sponsored H.R. 3343 (To amend the District of Columbia Home Rule Act to clarify the rules regarding the determination of the compensation of the Chief Financial Officer of the District of Columbia), a bill that would increase the cap on D.C.'s CFO pay from $199,700 to around $250,000.
- On March 10, 2014, Norton sponsored the District of Columbia Courts, Public Defender Service, and Court Services and Offender Supervision Agency Act of 2014 (H.R. 4185; 113th Congress), a bill that would make changes to the District of Columbia Official Code that governs the D.C. Courts system. Norton argued that the bill "will help make our local justice process more efficient and, therefore, more effective for the residents of the District."
- On October 2, 2014, ABC News reported that Norton, discussing her co-sponsorship of a bill aimed at changing the National Football League's tax-exempt status, stated: "The NFL greed is so widespread that they've chosen to operate as a tax-exempt organization. So we want to take that choice away from them unless, and until, they decide not to profit from a name that has now officially been declared a racial slur." In essence, Norton's position was that until the NFL forced the Washington Redskins owner (Daniel Marc Snyder) to change the team name she would support legislation that would change the NFL's tax status thereby costing the league money.
- On June 23, 2020, Norton announced plans to introduce legislation to remove the Emancipation Memorial. (The wages of formerly enslaved people funded the Emancipation Memorial statue.) That same day, protesters on site vowed to dismantle the statue on Thursday, June 25, at 7:00 p.m. local time. A barrier fence was installed around the memorial to protect it from vandalism, which was later removed. Norton reintroduced her bill on February 18, 2021.

=== Legislation supported ===
- Norton supported the Digital Accountability and Transparency Act of 2014 (S. 994; 113th Congress), a bill that would make information on federal expenditures more easily accessible and transparent. The bill would require the U.S. Department of the Treasury to establish common standards for financial data provided by all government agencies and to expand the amount of data that agencies must provide to the government website, USASpending. Norton said that the bill "will improve the quality of data that agencies make available about their spending."
- Norton supported the bill "To amend the Act entitled An Act to regulate the height of buildings in the District of Columbia to clarify the rules of the District of Columbia regarding human occupancy of penthouses above the top story of the building upon which the penthouse is placed" (H.R. 4192). The bill would increase the height limit of penthouses in D.C. to 20 feet, allowing for human occupancy. Norton said that "this bill is not a mandate directing the city to make any changes to penthouses or to its existing comprehensive plan or local zoning laws more generally."

== Appearances ==
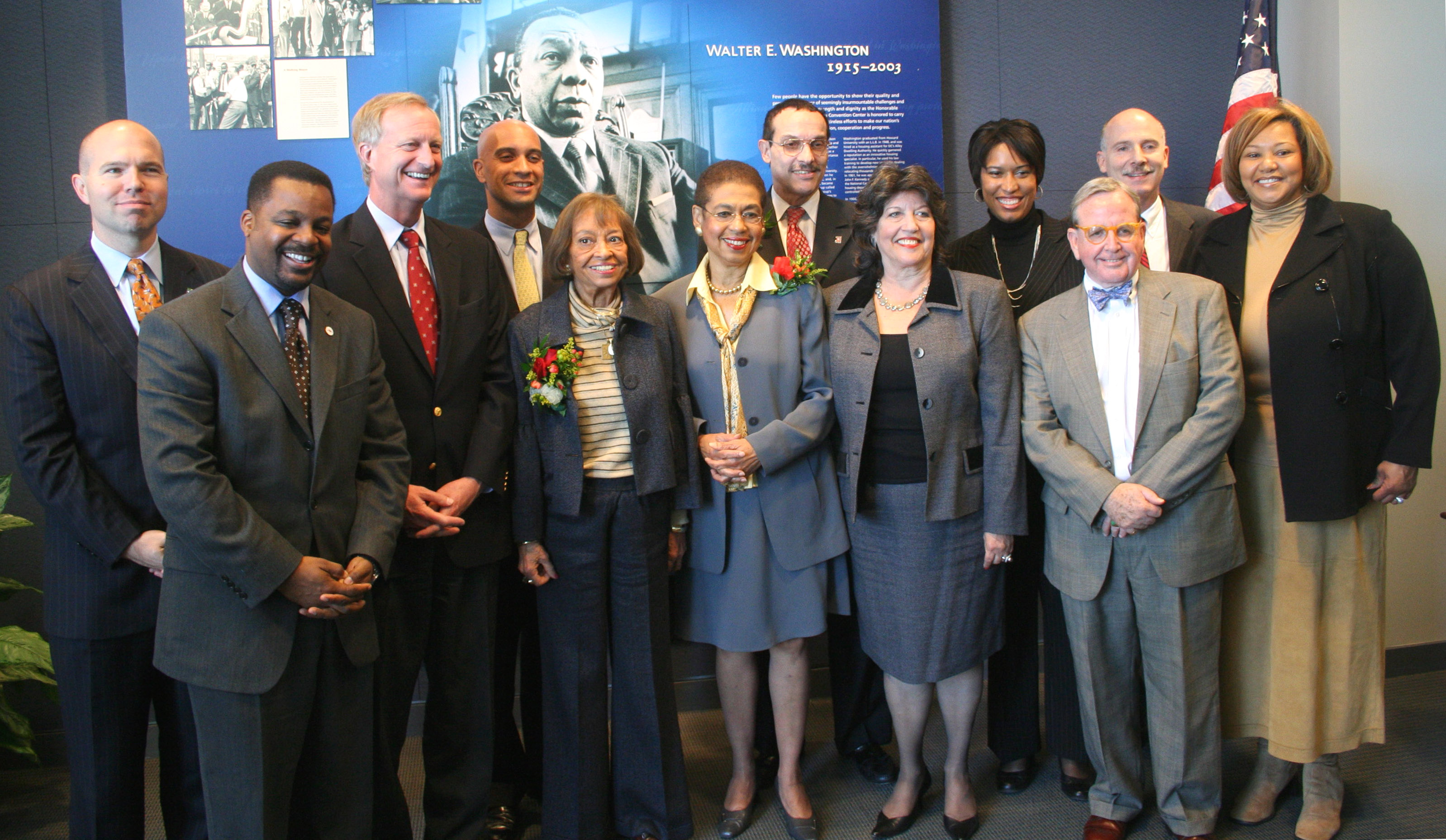
Norton with members of the Council of the District of Columbia in 2007

On July 27, 2006, Norton appeared on the "Better Know a District" segment of Comedy Central's The Colbert Report, in which she spiritedly defended the District of Columbia's claim to being a part of the United States. She also appeared on the joint The Colbert Report/The Daily Show "Midterm Midtacular" special on November 7, 2006. Norton gave further interviews to Stephen Colbert on March 22, 2007, and April 24, 2007, on the subject of representation in the District of Columbia. On February 12, 2008, Colbert and Norton discussed her status as a superdelegate as well as her support of Barack Obama for president. She appeared once again on February 11, 2009, to discuss D.C. representation and promised Colbert that she would make him an honorary citizen of Washington, D.C., and give him a key to the city, if D.C. citizens were given representation. Colbert in turn gave Norton a "TV promise" that he would be there should that happen. Norton made a further appearance on Colbert's show on June 25, 2014, where she discussed the impact that African-American Democrats had on incumbent Thad Cochran's primary defeat of Chris McDaniel, a Tea Party candidate, as well as Colbert's final episode among a cadre of past guests.

On June 27, 2008, Norton appeared on Democracy Now! to discuss the Supreme Court's ruling in District of Columbia v. Heller, which she strongly opposed. On December 5, 2014, Norton appeared on Hannity to discuss the shooting death of Michael Brown in Ferguson, Missouri, on which she admitted she did not read the evidence of the case, but criticized the racial profiling of young African Americans.

== Personal life ==
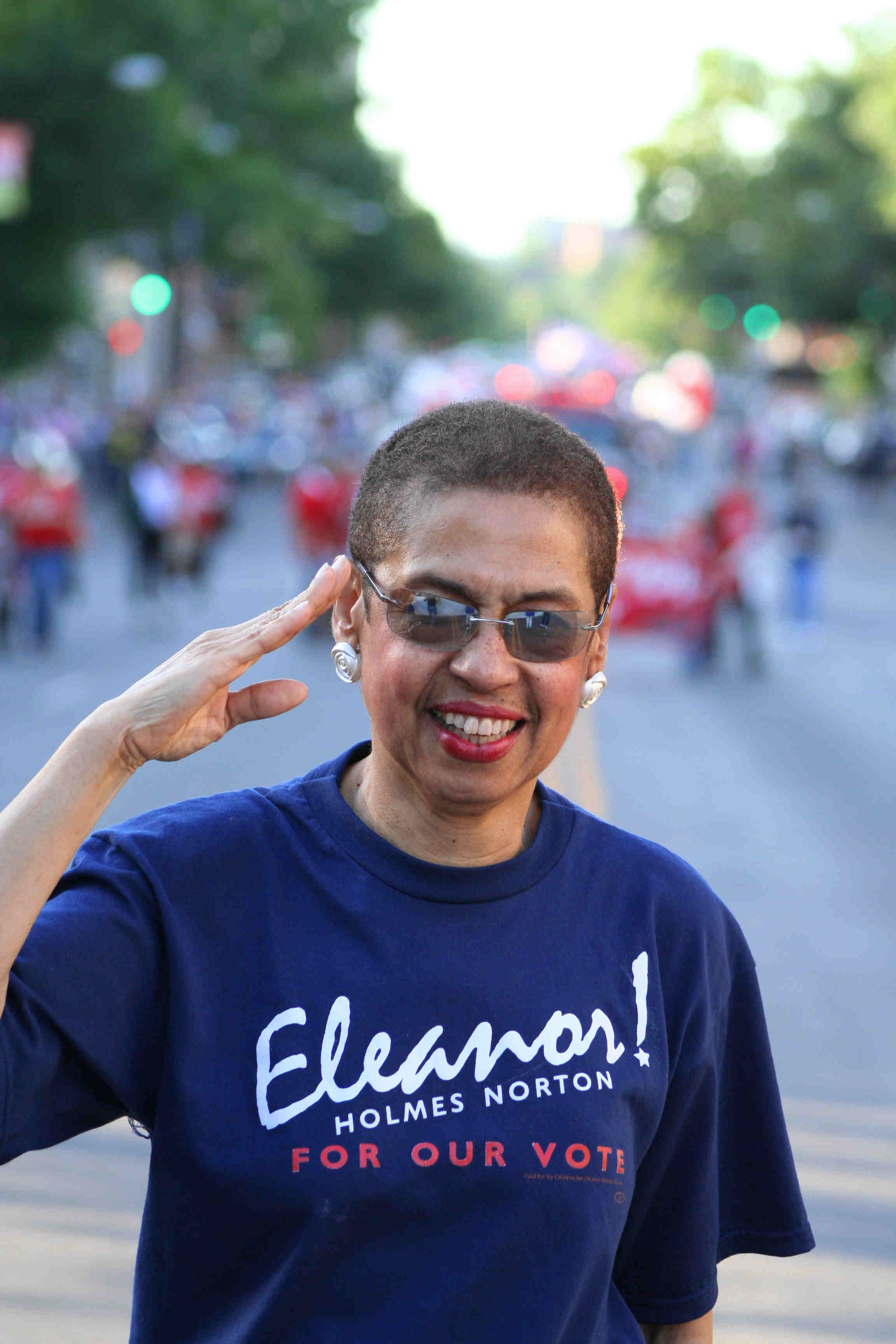
Norton at Capital Pride in 2006

Norton was married to Edward Norton. They separated on November 17, 1990, and he died in 2014. She has two children: John and Katherine; Katherine has Down syndrome. Norton is an Episcopalian.

In October 2025, Norton was reportedly scammed out of approximately $4,400 by a group claiming to be HVAC cleaners. According to a DC Police report that classified the incident as potential felony fraud, Norton appeared to be in the early stages of dementia and the incident was reported by her campaign treasurer, who the report characterized as a caretaker with power of attorney. In a statement to NBC4 Washington, Norton's office said that the person who made the report was not qualified to make a medical diagnosis, described her treasurer as a house manager who lived elsewhere as opposed to a caretaker, and did not address whether a power of attorney existed.

== In popular culture ==
Eleanor Holmes Norton is portrayed by Joy Bryant in Amazon Video's original series Good Girls Revolt and by Donna Biscoe in the HBO original movie Confirmation.

She is featured in the feminist history film She's Beautiful When She's Angry.

She is portrayed by Ayana Workman in the film Rustin.

== Awards ==
- Foremother Award from National Center for Health Research, 2011
- Coretta Scott King Legacy Award from the Coretta Scott King Center for Cultural and Intellectual Freedom, 2017
- Honoree, National Women's History Alliance, 2020

== See also ==
- List of African-American United States representatives
- Women in the United States House of Representatives
- List of people from Harlem

U.S. House of Representatives
Preceded by Walter Fauntroy	Delegate to the U.S. House of Representatives from the District of Columbia's at-large congressional district 1991–present	Incumbent
U.S. order of precedence (ceremonial)
Preceded by Aisha Wahab as U.S. Representative	United States delegates by seniority 1st	Succeeded by Stacey Plaskett
Honorary titles
Preceded by Grace Napolitano	Oldest member of the U.S. House of Representatives; Delegate; 2025–present Served alongside: Hal Rogers (Representative)	Incumbent
