= 2020 United States House of Representatives election in the District of Columbia =

- November 3, 2020
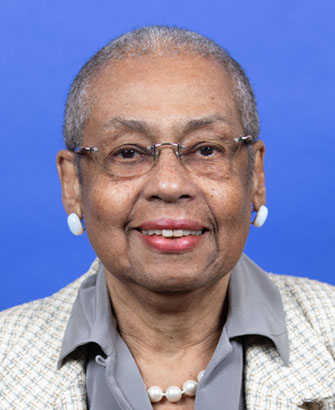

Candidate	Eleanor Holmes Norton	Patrick Hynes
Party	Democratic	Libertarian
Popular vote	281,831	9,678
Percentage	86.30%	2.96%
- Holmes-Norton: 70–80% 80–90% >90%
Delegate before election
Eleanor Holmes Norton
Democratic
Elected Delegate
Eleanor Holmes Norton
Democratic

On November 3, 2020, the District of Columbia held an election for its non-voting House delegate representing the District of Columbia's at-large congressional district. The election coincided with the elections of other federal, state, and local offices.

The non-voting delegate is elected for a two-year term. Democrat Eleanor Holmes Norton, who had represented the district since 1991, was re-elected to a sixteenth term in office.

== General election ==
=== Candidates ===
- John "Recovery" Cheeks (independent), candidate for Delegate in 2018
- Barbara Washington Franklin (independent), attorney
- Patrick Hynes (Libertarian), D.C. campaign director for 2020 presidential candidate Jo Jorgensen
- David Krucoff (independent), District of Columbia retrocession activist
- Amir Lowery (independent), former Major League Soccer player
- Omari Musa (Socialist Workers), nominee for Mayor of the District of Columbia in 2010
- Eleanor Holmes Norton (Democratic), incumbent Delegate
- Natale Lino Stracuzzi (D.C. Statehood Green), nominee for Delegate in 2012, in 2014, in 2016, and in 2018

=== Results ===
2020 United States House of Representatives election in District of Columbia
Party	Candidate	Votes	%
Democratic	Eleanor Holmes Norton (incumbent)	281,831	86.30
Libertarian	Patrick Hynes	9,678	2.96
Independent	Barbara Washington Franklin	7,628	2.34
Socialist Workers	Omari Musa	6,702	2.05
DC Statehood Green	Natale Lino Stracuzzi	5,553	1.70
Independent	David Krucoff	5,017	1.54
Independent	Amir Lowery	5,001	1.53
Independent	John Cheeks	2,914	0.89
Write-in		2,263	0.69
Total votes		326,587	100.00
Turnout			66.90

==== Results by ward ====
Ward	Eleanor Holmes Norton Democratic		Various candidates Other parties	
Ward	#	%	#	%
Ward 1	33,895	85.42%	5,785	14.58%
Ward 2	24,807	81.91%	5,480	18.69%
Ward 3	33,894	82.57%	7,153	17.43%
Ward 4	38,192	88.37%	5,028	11.63%
Ward 5	39,263	88.49%	5,107	11.51%
Ward 6	49,084	82.84%	10,169	17.16%
Ward 7	33,763	91.14%	3,283	8.86%
Ward 8	28,933	91.32%	2,751	8.68%
Total	281,831	86.3%	44,756	13.7%

== See also ==
- United States House of Representatives elections in the District of Columbia
