= 2022 United States House of Representatives election in the District of Columbia =

- November 8, 2022
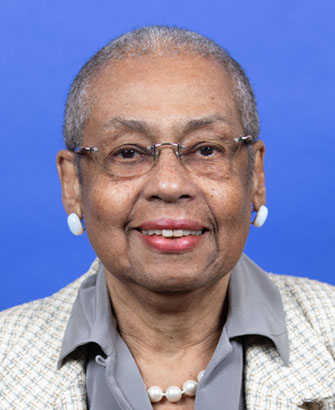

Candidate	Eleanor Holmes Norton	Nelson Rimensnyder
Party	Democratic	Republican
Popular vote	174,212	11,699
Percentage	86.54%	5.81%
- Holmes-Norton: 70–80% 80–90% >90%
Delegate before election
Eleanor Holmes Norton
Democratic
Elected Delegate
Eleanor Holmes Norton
Democratic

On November 8, 2022, the District of Columbia held an election for its non-voting House delegate representing the District of Columbia's at-large congressional district. The elections coincided with other elections to the House of Representatives, elections to the United States Senate and various state and local elections.

The incumbent was Democrat Eleanor Holmes Norton, who was re-elected with 86.83% of the vote in 2020.

== Democratic primary ==
=== Candidates ===
==== Nominee ====
- Eleanor Holmes Norton, incumbent delegate

==== Eliminated in primary ====
- Wendy Hamilton, ordained minister and Director of Spiritual and Cultural Outreach for the Andrew Yang 2020 presidential campaign
- Kelly Mikel Williams, journalist

==== Did not file ====
- Greg Maye, businessman

==== Declined ====
- Karl Racine, Attorney General for the District of Columbia (2015–present)

=== Endorsements ===
Wendy Hamilton

State legislators

- Jermaine Johnson, Member of the South Carolina House of Representatives from the 80th district (2020–present)

Party officials

- Andrew Yang, Leader of the Forward Party (2021–present), Presidential Ambassador for Global Entrepreneurship (2015–2017)

Individuals

- Marianne Williamson, author and political activist

Organizations

- Forward Party
Eleanor Holmes Norton

Newspapers

- The Washington Post

Organizations

- National Women's Political Caucus

=== Results ===
Democratic primary results
Party	Candidate	Votes	%
Democratic	Eleanor Holmes Norton (incumbent)	107,289	86.71%
Democratic	Kelly Mikel Williams	7,681	6.21%
Democratic	Wendy "Hope Dealer" Hamilton	7,680	6.21%
Democratic	Write-in	1,090	0.88%
Total votes		123,740	100%
n/a	Overvotes	146	
n/a	Undervotes	4,495	

== Republican primary ==
=== Candidate ===
==== Nominee ====
- Nelson Rimensnyder, nominee for U.S. Delegate in 2018

=== Results ===
Results by ward: Rimensnyder—70–80% Rimensnyder—80–90% Rimensnyder—>90%

Republican primary results
Party	Candidate	Votes	%
Republican	Nelson F. Rimensnyder	2,508	88.06%
Republican	Write-in	340	11.94%
Total votes		2,848	100%
n/a	Overvotes	13	
n/a	Undervotes	321	

== Libertarian primary ==
Bruce Majors signaled his intention to run for Delegate, but did not appear on the primary ballot. He won the nomination through write-in votes during the Libertarian primary.

=== Candidates ===
==== Declared ====
- Bruce Majors, nominee for U.S. Delegate in 2018 and candidate for mayor in 2014

=== Results ===
Libertarian primary results
Party	Candidate	Votes	%
Libertarian	Write-in	87	100
Total votes		87	100%
n/a	Undervotes	32	

== Statehood Green primary ==
=== Candidate ===
The D.C. Statehood Green candidate, Natale Stracuzzi, did not appear on the primary ballot, but won nomination through write-ins in the primary.

==== Nominee ====
- Natale Stracuzzi, nominee for U.S. Delegate in 2014 and 2016

=== Results ===
Statehood Green results
Party	Candidate	Votes	%
DC Statehood Green	Write-in	352	100
Total votes		352	100%
n/a	Undervotes	148	

== General election ==
=== Results ===
2022 United States House of Representatives election in District of Columbia
Party	Candidate	Votes	%
Democratic	Eleanor Holmes Norton (incumbent)	174,238	86.54
Republican	Nelson Rimensnyder	11,701	5.81
DC Statehood Green	Natale Stracuzzi	9,867	4.90
Libertarian	Bruce Major	4,003	1.99
Write-in		1,521	0.76
Total valid votes		201,330	97.84
Rejected ballots		4,444	2.16
Total votes		205,774	100.00
Turnout			40.76

=== Results by ward ===
Ward	Eleanor Holmes Norton Democratic		Nelson Rimensnyder Republican		Various candidates Other parties	
Ward	#	%	#	%	#	%
Ward 1	22,386	87.83%	962	3.77%	2,140	8.4%
Ward 2	16,399	82.71%	1,819	9.17%	1,609	8.12%
Ward 3	24,826	82.27%	2,925	9.69%	2,424	8.04%
Ward 4	25,277	88.47%	1,020	3.57%	2,273	7.95%
Ward 5	24,560	89.39%	967	3.52%	1,949	7.09%
Ward 6	32,030	83.41%	3,275	8.53%	3,094	8.06%
Ward 7	16,750	91.58%	445	2.43%	1,095	5.99%
Ward 8	12,010	91.64%	288	2.2%	807	6.16%
Total	174,238	86.54%	11,701	5.81%	15,391	7.65%

== See also ==
- United States House of Representatives elections in the District of Columbia
