= 1972 United States House of Representatives election in the District of Columbia =

- November 7, 1972
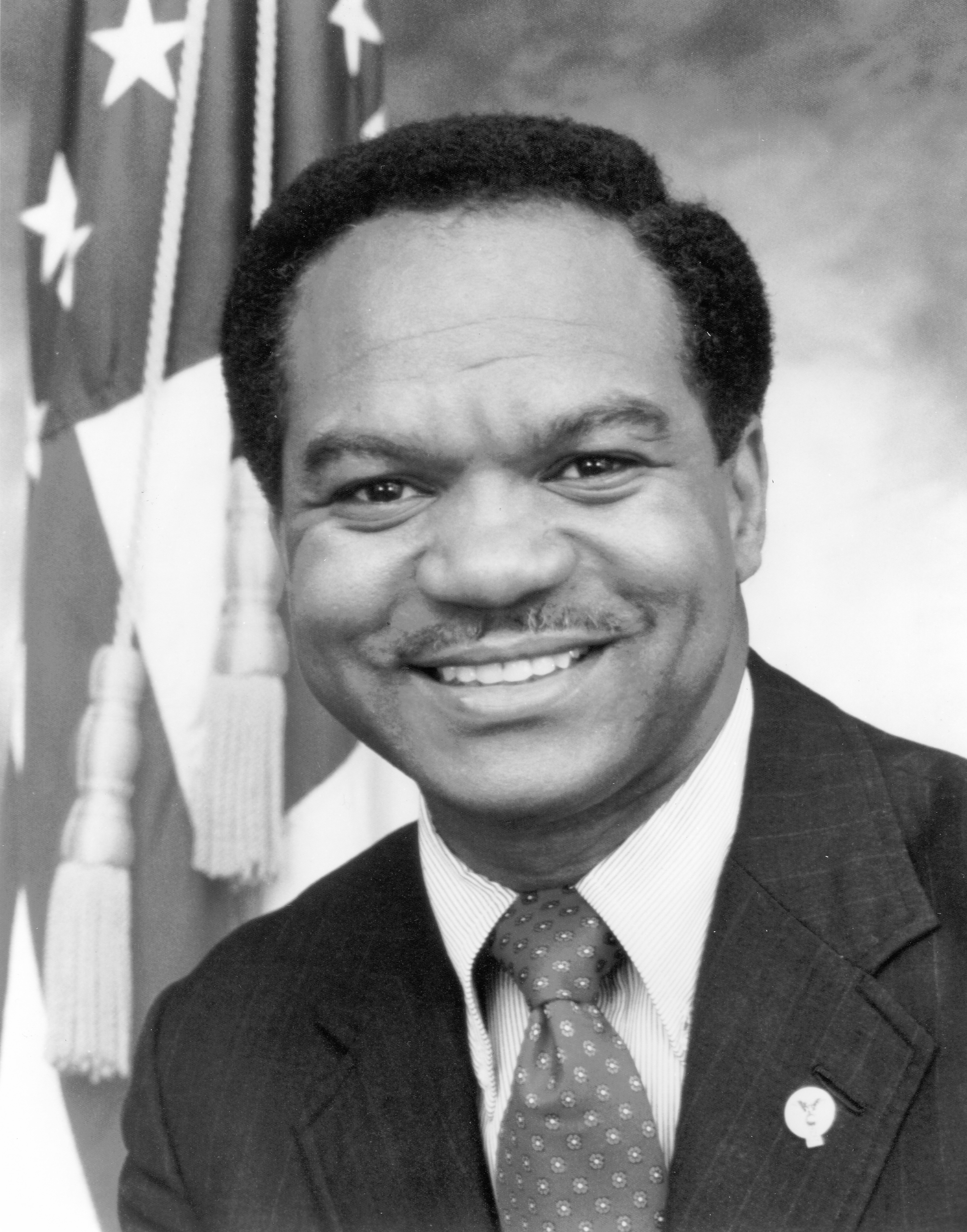

Candidate	Walter E. Fauntroy	William Chin-Lee	Charles I. Cassell
Party	Democratic	Republican	DC Statehood
Popular vote	95,300	39,487	18,730
Percentage	60.64%	25.12%	11.92%
Delegate before election
Walter E. Fauntroy
Democratic
Elected Delegate
Walter E. Fauntroy
Democratic

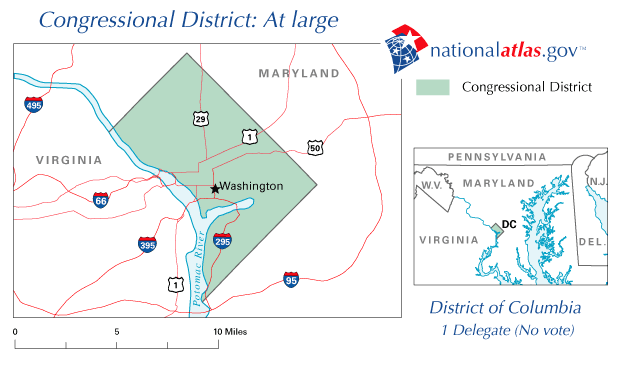
Map of the District of Columbia at-large district

On November 7, 1972, the District of Columbia held an election for its non-voting House delegate representing the District of Columbia's at-large congressional district. The winner of the race was Walter E. Fauntroy (D), who won his first re-election after winning the special election in the previous year. All elected members would serve in the 93rd United States Congress.

The non-voting delegate to the United States House of Representatives from the District of Columbia is elected for two-year terms, as are all other representatives and delegates, except the resident commissioner of Puerto Rico, who is elected to a four-year term.

== Candidates ==
Walter E. Fauntroy, a Democrat, sought re-election for his second term to the United States House of Representatives. He was opposed in this election by Republican challenger William Chin-Lee, who received 25.12%, and D.C. Statehood Party candidate Charles I. Cassell, who received 11.92%. This resulted in Fauntroy being elected with 60.64% of the vote.

=== Results ===
D.C. at-large congressional district election (1972)
Party	Candidate	Votes	%
Democratic	Walter E. Fauntroy (incumbent)	95,300	60.64
Republican	William Chin-Lee	39,487	25.12
DC Statehood	Charles I. Cassell	18,730	11.92
Independent	David H. Dabney	2,514	1.60
Socialist Workers	Herman Fagg	1,133	0.72
Total votes		157,164	100.00
Turnout			
Democratic hold			

== See also ==
- United States House of Representatives elections in the District of Columbia
