= 2024 United States House of Representatives election in the District of Columbia =

- November 5, 2024
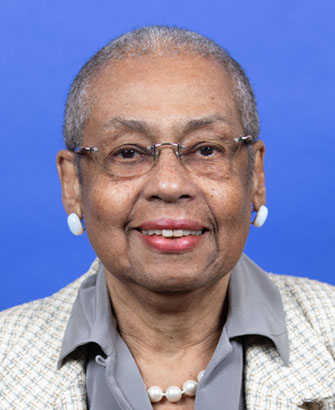

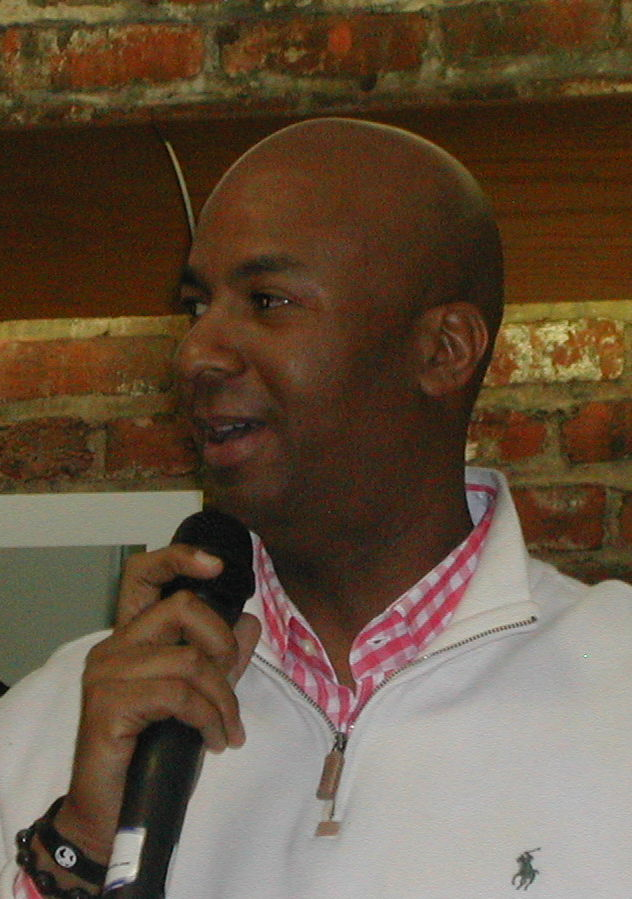
Nominee	Eleanor Holmes Norton	Kymone Freeman
Party	Democratic	DC Statehood Green
Popular vote	245,453	21,114
Percentage	80.6%	6.9%
Nominee	Myrtle Alexander	Michael A. Brown
Party	Republican	Independent
Popular vote	19,375	18,738
Percentage	6.4%	6.2%
- Holmes-Norton: 60–70% 70–80% 80–90%
Delegate before election
Eleanor Holmes Norton
Democratic
Elected Delegate
Eleanor Holmes Norton
Democratic

The 2024 United States House of Representatives election in the District of Columbia was held on November 5, 2024, to elect a non-voting delegate to represent the District of Columbia in the United States House of Representatives. The election coincided with the 2024 U.S. presidential election, as well as other elections to the U.S. House, elections to the United States Senate, and various other state and local elections.

Incumbent Democratic delegate Eleanor Holmes Norton was first elected in 1991 and re-elected in 2022 with 86.5% of the vote. Holmes Norton ran for re-election, winning her 18th successive term.

== Democratic primary ==
=== Candidates ===
==== Nominee ====
- Eleanor Holmes Norton, incumbent delegate

==== Eliminated in primary ====
- Kelly Mikel Williams, podcast host and candidate for U.S. House in 2022

==== Withdrew ====
- Michael A. Brown, former D.C. councilor and convicted felon

=== Endorsements ===
Eleanor Holmes Norton

Organizations

- Humane Society Legislative Fund
- National Women's Political Caucus

Labor unions

- Association of Flight Attendants

=== Results ===
Democratic primary results
Party	Candidate	Votes	%
Democratic	Eleanor Holmes Norton (incumbent)	72,979	79.60%
Democratic	Kelly Mikel Williams	17,540	19.13%
Democratic	Write-in	1,164	1.27%
Total votes		91,684	100%
n/a	Overvotes	87	
n/a	Undervotes	3,186	

== Republican primary ==
=== Candidates ===
==== Nominee ====
- Myrtle Alexander, business executive

=== Results ===
Republican primary results
Party	Candidate	Votes	%
Republican	Myrtle Patricia Alexander	2,022	88.61%
Republican	Write-in	260	11.39%
Total votes		2,282	100%
n/a	Overvotes	5	
n/a	Undervotes	288	

== Statehood Green primary ==
=== Candidates ===
==== Nominee ====
- Kymone Freeman, playwright and radio host

=== Results ===
Statehood Green results
Party	Candidate	Votes	%
DC Statehood Green	Kymone Freeman	406	83.54%
DC Statehood Green	Write-in	80	16.46%
Total votes		486	100%
n/a	Overvotes	6	
n/a	Undervotes	47	

== Independent ==
=== Candidates ===
- Michael A. Brown (Formerly ran as a Democrat)

== General election ==
=== Results ===
2024 United States House of Representatives election in District of Columbia
Party	Candidate	Votes	%	±%
Democratic	Eleanor Holmes Norton (incumbent)	251,540	80.09	−6.45
DC Statehood Green	Kymone Freeman	21,873	6.96	+2.06
Republican	Myrtle Patricia Alexander	19,765	6.29	+0.48
Independent	Michael A. Brown	19,033	6.06	N/A
Write-in		1,858	0.59	-0.17
Total votes		314,069	100.00	
Democratic hold				

=== Results by ward ===
Ward	Eleanor Holmes Norton Democratic		Mrytle Patricia Alexander Republican		Various candidates Other parties	
Ward	#	%	#	%	#	%
Ward 1	31,229	80.19%	1,863	4.78%	5,852	15.02%
Ward 2	28,083	77.61%	3,323	9.18%	4,778	13.21%
Ward 3	32,813	77.0%	4,056	9.52%	5,743	13.48%
Ward 4	33,009	80.74%	1.866	4.56%	6,006	14.69%
Ward 5	35,642	81.43%	1,848	4.22%	6,280	14.35%
Ward 6	36,508	77.64%	4,298	9.14%	6,215	13.22%
Ward 7	30,339	84.27%	1,225	3.4%	4,437	12.33%
Ward 8	23,917	83.46%	1,286	4.49%	3,453	12.06%
Total	251,540	80.09%	19,765	6.29%	42,764	13.61%

== See also ==
- United States House of Representatives elections in the District of Columbia
