= 1971 United States House of Representatives election in the District of Columbia =

- March 23, 1971
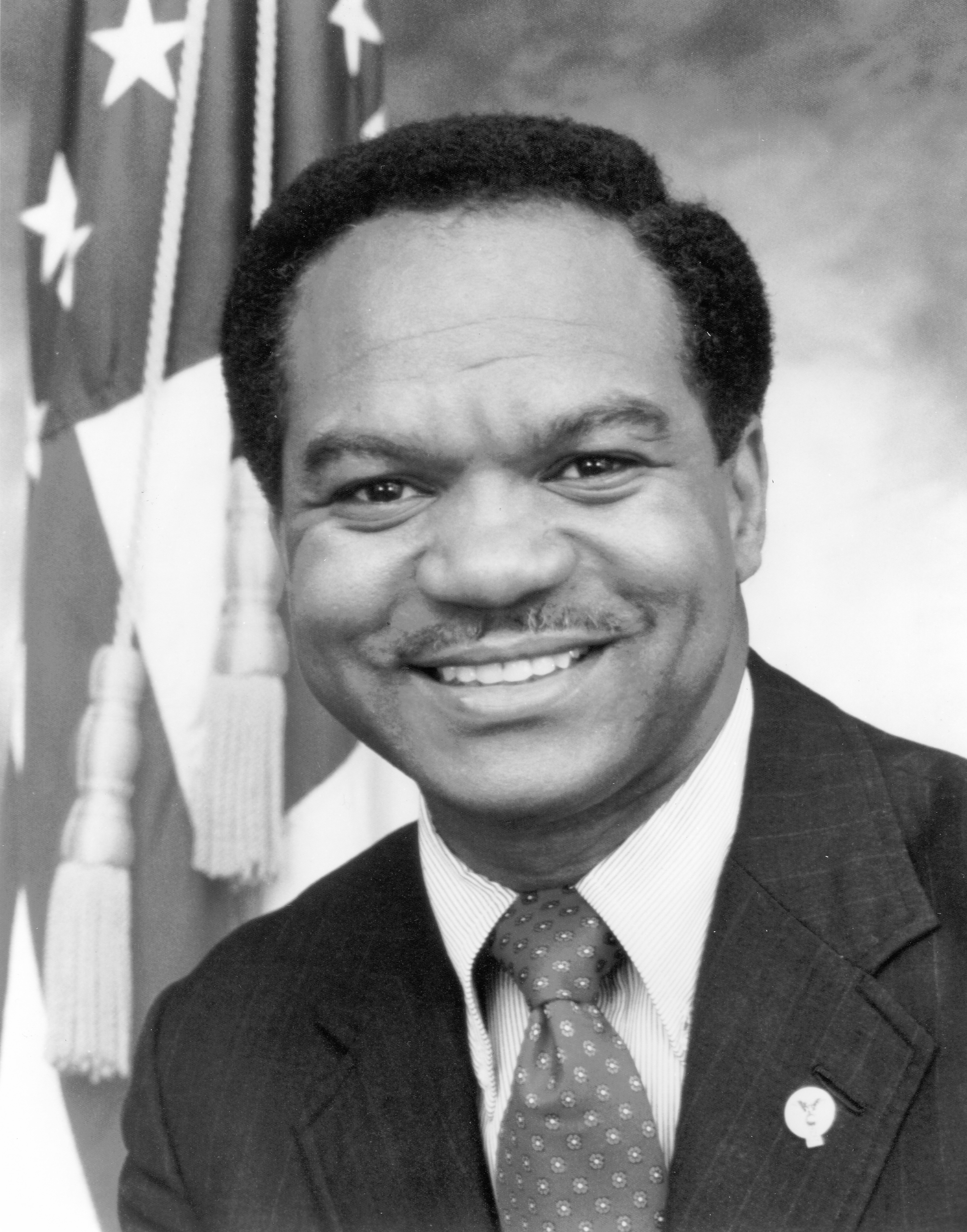

Candidate	Walter E. Fauntroy	John A. Nevius	Julius Hobson
Party	Democratic	Republican	DC Statehood
Popular vote	68,166	29,249	15,427
Percentage	58.44%	25.08%	13.23%
- Ward results Fauntroy: 50–60% 60–70% 70–80% Nevius: 60–70%
Elected Delegate
Walter E. Fauntroy
Democratic

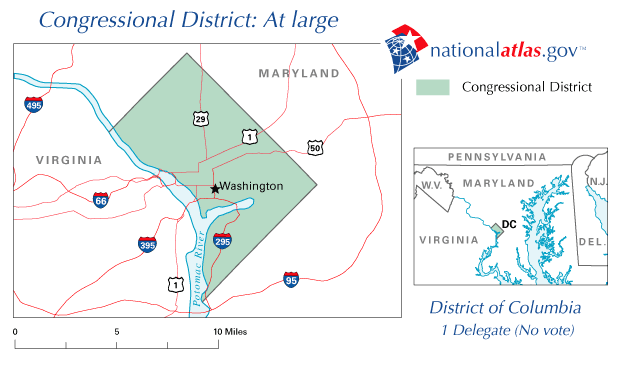
Map of the District of Columbia At-Large district.

On March 23, 1971, the District of Columbia held a special election for its non-voting House delegate representing the District of Columbia's at-large congressional district. This was the first election for the newly re-created district since Norton P. Chipman briefly held the seat during the Reconstruction Era. The winner of the race was Walter E. Fauntroy, a Democrat. After serving his remaining term in the 92nd United States Congress, he would continue to be re-elected until he stepped down to run for mayor in the 1990 election.

The non-voting delegate to the United States House of Representatives from the District of Columbia is elected for two-year terms, as are all other Representatives and Delegates minus the Resident Commissioner of Puerto Rico, who is elected to a four-year term.

== Candidates ==
Walter E. Fauntroy, a Democrat, sought election for his first term to the United States House of Representatives. Fauntroy was opposed in this election by Republican challenger John A. Nevius, who received 25.08%, and D.C. Statehood Party candidate Julius Hobson who received 13.23%. This resulted in Fauntroy being elected with 58.44% of the vote. This is the lowest percentage that a Democratic candidate has received in any election to the District of Columbia's at-large congressional district.

=== Results ===
D.C. At Large Congressional District Special Election (March 23, 1971)
Party	Candidate	Votes	%
Democratic	Walter E. Fauntroy	68,166	58.44
Republican	John A. Nevius	29,249	25.08
DC Statehood	Julius Hobson	15,427	13.23
Independent	Frank Kameny	1,888	1.62
Independent	Douglas Moore	1,301	1.12
Socialist Workers	James E. Harris	431	0.37
No party	Write-ins	173	0.15
Total votes		116,635	100.00
Turnout			
Democratic gain from Republican			
