= 1988 United States House of Representatives election in the District of Columbia =

- November 8, 1988
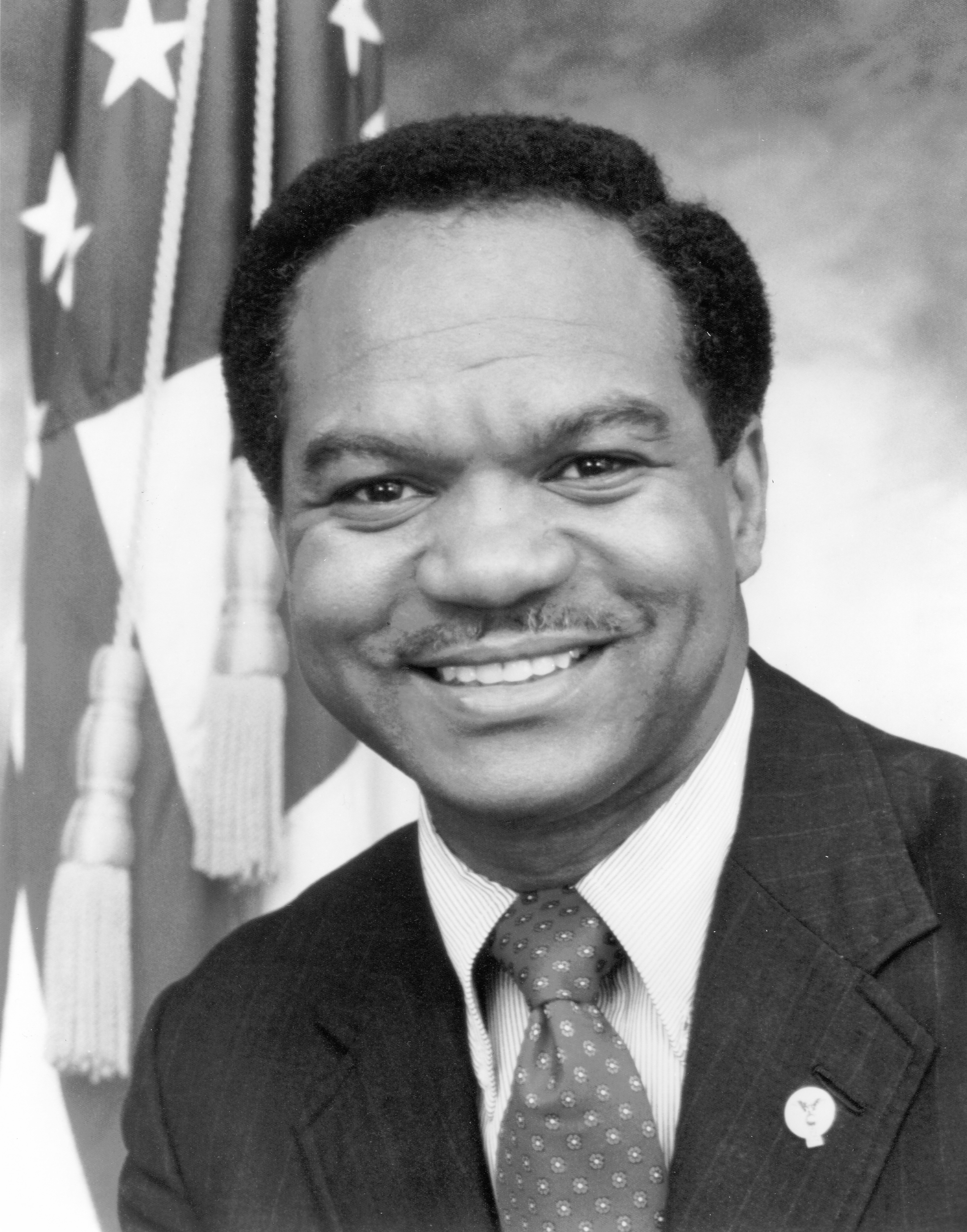

Candidate	Walter Fauntroy	Ron Evans
Party	Democratic	Republican
Popular vote	121,817	22,936
Percentage	71.27%	13.42%
Candidate	Alvin C. Frost	David H. Dabney
Party	DC Statehood	Independent
Popular vote	13,802	10,449
Percentage	8.07%	6.11%
Delegate before election
Walter Fauntroy
Democratic
Elected Delegate
Walter Fauntroy
Democratic

On November 8, 1988, the District of Columbia held an election for its non-voting House delegate representing the District of Columbia's at-large congressional district. The winner of the race was Walter E. Fauntroy (D), who won his ninth re-election. All elected members would serve in 101st United States Congress.

The delegate is elected for two-year terms.

== Candidates ==
Walter E. Fauntroy, a Democrat, sought re-election for his tenth and final term to the United States House of Representatives. Fauntroy was opposed in this election by Republican challenger Ron Evans and D.C. Statehood Party candidate Alvin C. Frost, who received 13.42% and 8.07%, respectively. Independent candidate David H. Dabney also participated and received 6.11%. This resulted in Fauntroy being elected with 71.27% of the vote.

=== Results ===
D.C. At Large Congressional District Election (1988)
Party	Candidate	Votes	%
Democratic	Walter E. Fauntroy (inc.)	121,817	71.27
Republican	Ron Evans	22,936	13.42
DC Statehood	Alvin C. Frost	13,802	8.07
Independent	David H. Dabney	10,449	6.11
No party	Write-ins	1,929	1.13
Total votes		170,933	100.00
Turnout			
Democratic hold			

== See also ==
- United States House of Representatives elections in the District of Columbia
