= 1974 United States House of Representatives election in the District of Columbia =

- November 5, 1974
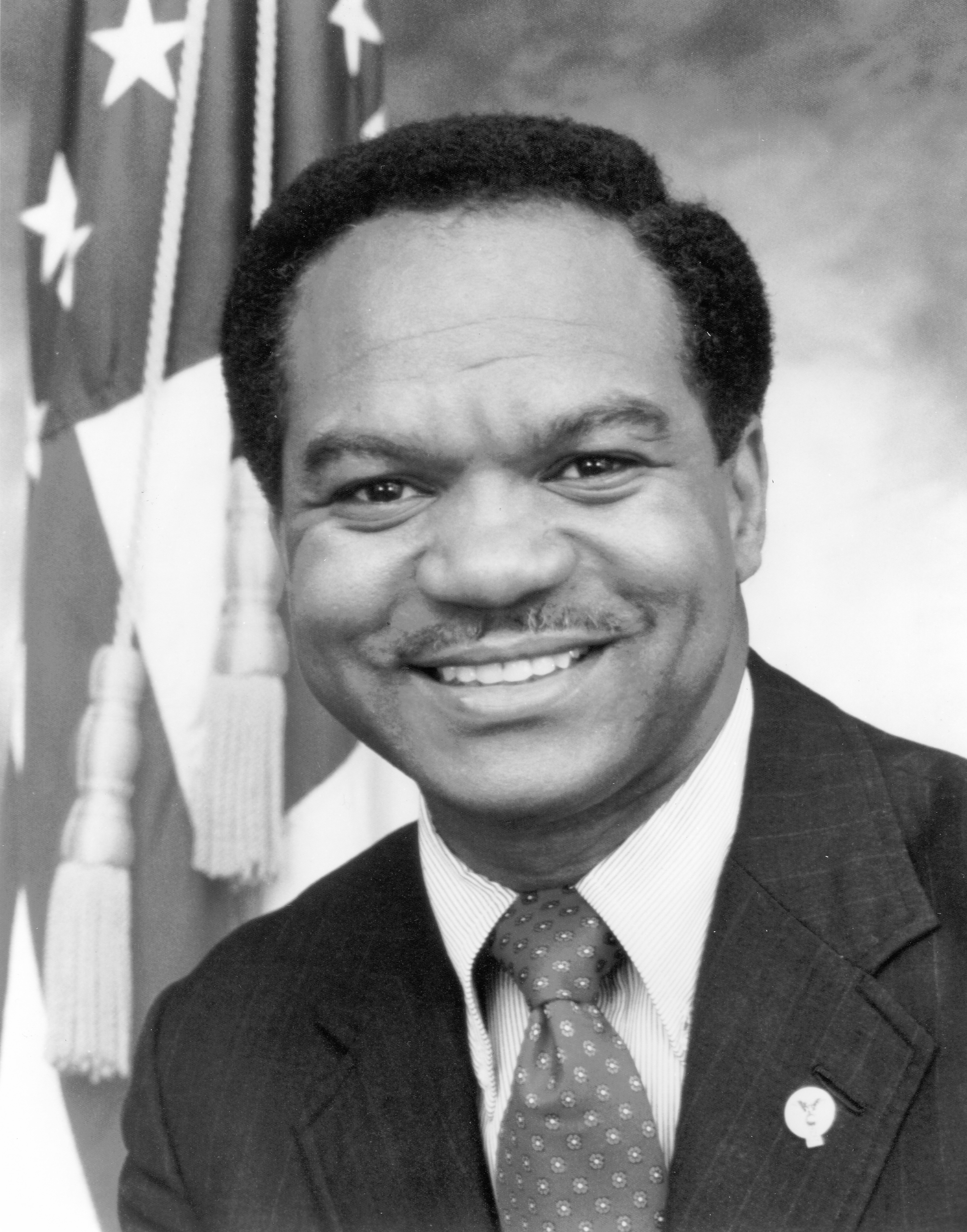

Candidate	Walter E. Fauntroy	James G. Banks	William R. Phillips
Party	Democratic	Independent	Republican
Popular vote	66,337	21,874	9,166
Percentage	63.78%	21.03%	8.81%
Delegate before election
Walter E. Fauntroy
Democratic
Elected Delegate
Walter E. Fauntroy
Democratic

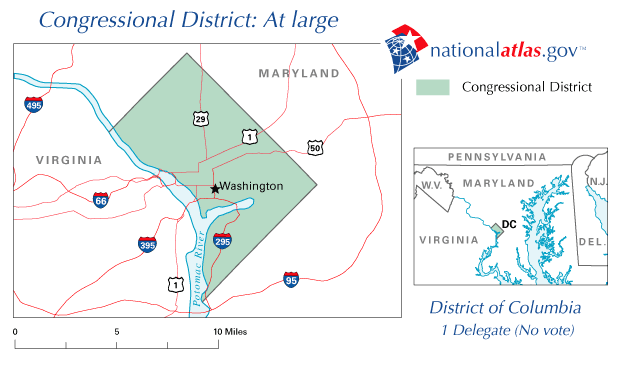
Map of the District of Columbia's et-large district

On November 5, 1974, the District of Columbia held an election for its non-voting House delegate representing the District of Columbia's at-large congressional district. The winner of the race was Walter E. Fauntroy (D), who won his second re-election. Independent candidate James G. Banks surprised many by taking second place, ahead of William R. Phillips (R) and D.C. Statehood Party candidate Anton V. Wood. All elected members would serve in the 94th United States Congress.

The non-voting delegate is elected for two-year terms, as are all other representatives and delegates, except the resident commissioner of Puerto Rico, who is elected to a four-year term.

== Candidates ==
Walter E. Fauntroy, a Democrat, sought re-election for his third term to the United States House of Representatives. Fauntroy was opposed in this election by independent James G. Banks, who received 21.03% by taking many votes away from Republican challenger William R. Phillips and Statehood Party candidate Anton V. Wood, who only received 8.81% and 2.92%, respectively. This resulted in Fauntroy being elected with 63.78% of the vote.

=== Results ===
D.C. at-large congressional district election (1974)
Party	Candidate	Votes	%
Democratic	Walter E. Fauntroy (inc.)	66,337	63.78
Independent	James G. Banks	21,874	21.03
Republican	William R. Phillips	9,166	8.81
DC Statehood	Anton V. Wood	3,039	2.92
Independent	Susan Pennington	1,813	1.74
Independent	David H. Dabney	1,539	1.48
No party	Write-ins	246	0.24
Total votes		104,014	100.00
Turnout			
Democratic hold			

== See also ==
- United States House of Representatives elections in the District of Columbia
