= 1980 United States House of Representatives election in the District of Columbia =

- November 4, 1980
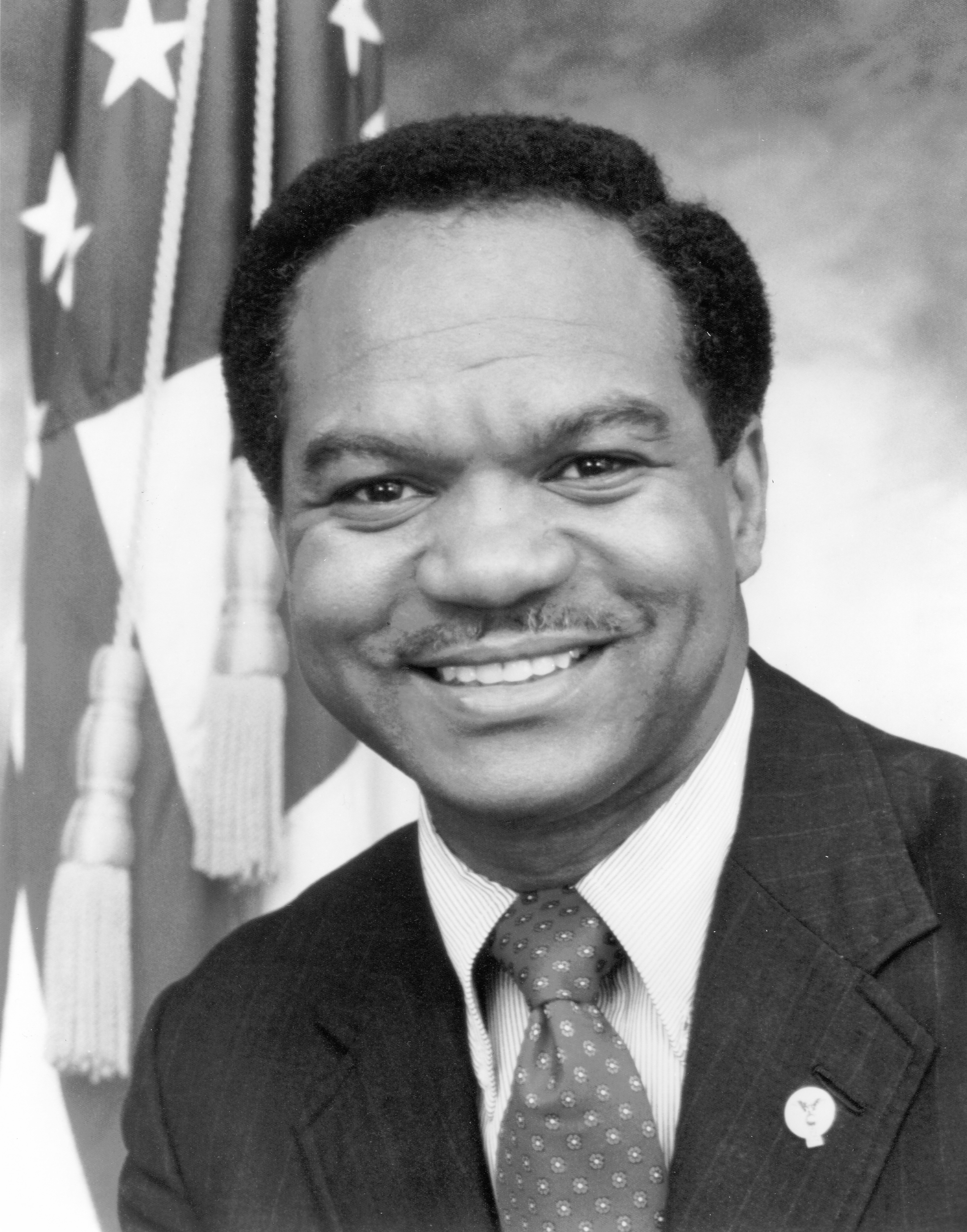

Candidate	Walter E. Fauntroy	Robert J. Roehr	Josephine D. Butler
Party	Democratic	Republican	DC Statehood
Popular vote	111,631	21,021	14,325
Percentage	74.44%	14.02%	9.55%
Delegate before election
Walter E. Fauntroy
Democratic
Elected Delegate
Walter E. Fauntroy
Democratic

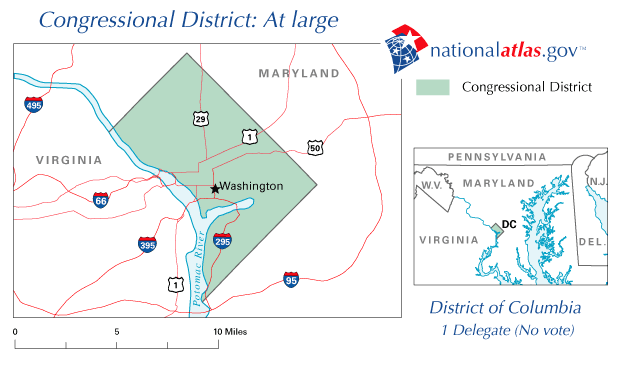
Map of the District of Columbia At-Large district.

On November 4, 1980, the District of Columbia held an election for its non-voting House delegate representing the District of Columbia's at-large congressional district. The winner of the race was Walter E. Fauntroy (D), who won his fifth re-election. All elected members would serve in 97th United States Congress.

The delegate is elected for two-year terms.

== Candidates ==
Walter E. Fauntroy, a Democrat, sought re-election for his sixth term to the United States House of Representatives. Fauntroy was opposed in this election by Republican challenger Robert J. Roehr and D.C. Statehood Party candidate Josephine D. Butler who received 14.02% and 9.55%, respectively. This resulted in Fauntroy being elected with 74.44% of the vote.

=== Results ===
D.C. At Large Congressional District Election (1980)
Party	Candidate	Votes	%
Democratic	Walter E. Fauntroy (inc.)	111,631	74.44
Republican	Robert J. Roehr	21,021	14.02
DC Statehood	Josephine D. Butler	14,325	9.55
No party	Write-ins	2,979	1.99
Total votes		149,956	100.00
Turnout			
Democratic hold			

== See also ==
- United States House of Representatives elections in the District of Columbia
