= United States House of Representatives elections in the District of Columbia =

The District of Columbia is a political division coterminous with Washington, D.C., the capital city of the United States. According to the Article One of the Constitution, only states may be represented in the United States Congress. The District of Columbia is not a U.S. state and therefore has no voting representation.

In 1871, Congress reorganized the District of Columbia into a single territorial government that was partially elected. It also permitted the district to elect a delegate to the House of Representatives, a type of non-voting member. Norton P. Chipman served two terms as the district's delegate until Congress abolished the territorial government in 1874. The city went nearly 100 years without any representation in Congress. With the enactment of the District of Columbia Delegate Act in 1970, its at-large congressional district was established. Constituents are again authorized to elect a delegate House. The district has held 29 delegate elections in total.

In 2009, the Senate passed the District of Columbia House Voting Rights Act, which would allow the district to elect a voting member to the House. However, an amendment added by John Ensign would repeal most of the district's gun laws and prohibit it from restricting gun rights any further. This took place eight months after the Supreme Court's ruling on District of Columbia v. Heller, which declared a D.C. gun law unconstitutional. The Democratic leaders in the House admitted that they could not support the bill if it included the Ensign amendment, and the never voted on it.

The majority of residents want the district to become a state and gain full voting representation in Congress. To prepare for this goal, the district has elected shadow representatives since 1990. The shadow representative emulates the role of representing the district in the House and pushes for statehood alongside the delegate and shadow senators. The district has held 17 shadow representative elections.

The Democratic Party has immense political strength in the district; in each of the delegate and shadow representative elections (excluding the 1870s elections), the district has overwhelmingly voted for the Democratic candidate, with no margin less than 33 and 56 percentage points, respectively. In two delegate and two shadow representative elections, the Democratic candidate ran unopposed.

== Delegate elections ==
Key for parties
Democratic Party – (D)
D.C. Statehood Green Party – (STG)
D.C. Statehood Party – (ST)
Independent candidate – (I)
Libertarian Party – (L)
Republican Party – (R)

U.S. House delegate elections in the District of Columbia from 1871 to 1872 and 1971 to present
Year	Winner			Runner-up			Other candidate (Note: For purposes of these lists, other candidates are defined as those who were in third place. Write-in totals are not represented.)			Ref.
Year	Candidate	Votes	%	Candidate	Votes	%	Candidate	Votes	%	Ref.
1871	Norton P. Chipman (R)	15,196	57.78%	Richard T. Merrick (D)	11,104	42.22%	—N/a	—N/a	—N/a	
1872	Norton P. Chipman (R)	12,443	63.86%	L. G. Hine (D)	7,042	36.14%	—N/a	—N/a	—N/a	
1971	Walter Fauntroy (D)	68,166	58.44%	John A. Nevius (R)	29,249	25.08%	Julius Hobson (ST)	15,427	13.23%	
1972	Walter Fauntroy (D)	95,300	60.64%	William Chin-Lee (R)	39,487	25.12%	Charles I. Cassell (ST)	18,730	11.92%	
1974	Walter Fauntroy (D)	66,337	63.78%	James G. Banks (I)	21,874	21.03%	William R. Phillips (R)	9,166	8.81%	
1976	Walter Fauntroy (D)	12,149	77.18%	Daniel L. Hall (R)	1,076	6.84%	Louis S. Aronica (ST)	545	0.32%	
1978	Walter Fauntroy (D)	76,557	79.59%	Jackson R. Champion (R)	11,677	12.02%	Gregory Rowe (ST)	3,886	4.04%	
1980	Walter Fauntroy (D)	111,631	74.44%	Robert J. Roehr (R)	21,021	14.02%	Josephine D. Butler (ST)	14,325	9.55%	
1982	Walter Fauntroy (D)	93,422	83.01%	John West (R)	27,590	15.32%	—N/a	—N/a	—N/a	
1984	Walter Fauntroy (D)	154,583	95.56%	—N/a	—N/a	—N/a	—N/a	—N/a	—N/a	
1986	Walter Fauntroy (D)	101,604	80.09%	Mary L. H. King (R)	17,643	13.91%	Julie McCall (ST)	6,122	4.83%	
1988	Walter Fauntroy (D)	121,817	71.27%	Ron Evans (R)	22,936	13.42%	Alvin C. Frost (ST)	13,802	8.07%	
1990	Eleanor Holmes Norton (D)	98,442	61.67%	Harry M. Singleton (R)	41,999	26.31%	George X. Cure (I)	8,156	5.11%	
1992	Eleanor Holmes Norton (D)	166,808	84.78%	Susan Emerson (R)	20,108	10.22%	Susan Griffin (ST)	7,253	3.69%	
1994	Eleanor Holmes Norton (D)	154,988	89.25%	Donald A. Saltz (R)	13,828	7.96%	Rasco P. Braswell (ST)	2,824	1.63%	
1996	Eleanor Holmes Norton (D)	134,996	90.00%	Sprague Simonds (R)	11,306	7.54%	Faith Dane (I)	2,119	1.41%	
1998	Eleanor Holmes Norton (D)	122,228	89.64%	Edward Henry Wolterbeek (R)	8,610	6.31%	Pat Kidd (ST)	2,323	1.70%	
2000	Eleanor Holmes Norton (D)	158,824	90.43%	Edward Henry Wolterbeek (R)	10,258	5.84%	Rob Kampia (L)	4,594	2.62%	
2002	Eleanor Holmes Norton (D)	119,268	93.01%	Pat Kidd (I)	7,733	6.03%	—N/a	—N/a	—N/a	
2004	Eleanor Holmes Norton (D)	202,027	91.33%	Michael Andrew Monroe (R)	18,296	8.27%	—N/a	—N/a	—N/a	
2006	Eleanor Holmes Norton (D)	111,726	97.34%	—N/a	—N/a	—N/a	—N/a	—N/a	—N/a	
2008	Eleanor Holmes Norton (D)	228,376	92.28%	Maude Hills (STG)	16,693	6.75%	—N/a	—N/a	—N/a	
2010	Eleanor Holmes Norton (D)	117,990	88.94%	Missy Reilly Smith (R)	8,109	6.11%	Rick Tingling-Clemmons (STG)	4,413	3.33%	
2012	Eleanor Holmes Norton (D)	246,664	88.55%	Bruce Majors (L)	16,524	5.93%	Natale Stracuzzi (STG)	13,243	4.75%	
2014	Eleanor Holmes Norton (D)	143,923	83.73%	Nelson Rimensnyder (R)	11,673	6.79%	Tim Krepp (I)	9,101	5.29%	
2016	Eleanor Holmes Norton (D)	265,178	88.13%	Martin Moulton (L)	18,713	6.22%	Natale Stracuzzi (STG)	14,336	4.76%	
2018	Eleanor Holmes Norton (D)	199,124	87.04%	Nelson Rimensnyder (R)	9,700	4.24%	Natale Stracuzzi (STG)	8,636	3.77%	
2020	Eleanor Holmes Norton (D)	281,831	86.30%	Patrick Hynes (L)	9,678	2.96%	Barbara Washington Franklin (I)	7,628	2.34%	
2022	Eleanor Holmes Norton (D)	174,238	86.54%	Nelson Rimensnyder (R)	11,701	5.81%	Natale Stracuzzi (STG)	9,867	4.90%	
2024	Eleanor Holmes Norton (D)	251,540	80.09%	Kymone Freeman (STG)	21,873	6.96%	Myrtle Patricia Alexander (R)	19,765	6.29%	

=== Graph ===
The following graph shows the margin of victory of the Democratic Party over the runner-up in the 29 U.S. House delegate elections the District of Columbia has held, excluding the two during the 1870s.

== Shadow representative elections ==
Key for parties
Democratic Party – (D)
D.C. Statehood Green Party – (STG)
D.C. Statehood Party – (ST)
Green Party – (G)
Independent candidate – (I)
Libertarian Party – (L)
Republican Party – (R)

U.S. House shadow representative elections in the District of Columbia from 1990 to present
Year	Winner			Runner-up			Other candidate			Ref.
Year	Candidate	Votes	%	Candidate	Votes	%	Candidate	Votes	%	Ref.
1990	Charles J. Moreland (D)	92,764	73.53%	Howard Lamar Jones (R)	17,867	14.16%	Tom Chorlton (ST)	15,535	12.31%	
1992	Charles J. Moreland (D)	135,592	69.96%	Paul McAllister (ST)	25,399	13.10%	Gloria R. Corn (R)	25,035	12.92%	
1994	John Capozzi (D)	104,532	68.65%	Edward D. Turpin (R)	18,756	12.32%	Paul McAllister (ST)	14,147	9.29%	
1996	Sabrina Sojourner (D)	111,413	83.37%	Gloria R. Corn (R)	20,240	15.15%	—N/a	—N/a	—N/a	
1998	Tom Bryant Jr. (D)	86,546	76.75%	David VanWilliams (ST)	14,637	12.98%	Mike Livingston (G)	9,479	8.41%	
2000	Ray Browne (D)	120,700	74.53%	Martin Thomas (STG)	20,960	12.94%	John Shumake (R)	15,382	9.50%	
2002	Ray Browne (D)	95,159	84.71%	Adam Eidinger (STG)	15,611	13.90%	—N/a	—N/a	—N/a	
2004	Ray Browne (D)	168,693	86.30%	Adam Eidinger (STG)	25,077	12.83%	—N/a	—N/a	—N/a	
2006	Mike Panetta (D)	82,759	77.47%	Keith R. Ware (STG)	13,511	12.65%	Nelson Rimensnyder (R)	9,700	9.08%	
2008	Mike Panetta (D)	187,362	85.87%	Joyce Robinson-Paul (STG)	28,703	13.16%	—N/a	—N/a	—N/a	
2010	Mike Panetta (D)	101,207	82.35%	Nelson Rimensnyder (R)	11,094	9.03%	Joyce Robinson-Paul (STG)	9,489	7.72%	
2012	Nate Bennett-Fleming (D)	206,996	85.78%	G. Lee Aikin (STG)	31,190	12.93%	—N/a	—N/a	—N/a	
2014	Franklin Garcia (D)	114,073	77.61%	Joyce Robinson-Paul (STG)	19,982	13.59%	Martin Moulton (L)	11,002	7.48%	
2016	Franklin Garcia (D)	252,992	97.33%	—N/a	—N/a	—N/a	—N/a	—N/a	—N/a	
2018	Franklin Garcia (D)	197,299	96.94%	—N/a	—N/a	—N/a	—N/a	—N/a	—N/a	
2020	Oye Owolewa (D)	240,533	81.60%	Joyce Robinson-Paul (STG)	27,128	9.20%	Sohaer Rizvi Syed (I)	22,771	7.72%	
2022	Oye Owolewa (D)	151,182	83.63%	Joyce Robinson-Paul (STG)	26,530	14.68%	—N/a	—N/a	—N/a	
2024	Oye Owolewa (D)	267,661	90.75%	Ciprian Ivanof (R)	25,040	8.49%	—N/a	—N/a	—N/a	

=== Graph ===
The following graph shows the margin of victory of the Democratic Party over the runner-up in the 17 U.S. House shadow representative elections the District of Columbia has held.

== See also ==
- Elections in the District of Columbia
  - United States presidential elections in the District of Columbia
  - United States Senate elections in the District of Columbia
- List of United States House of Representatives elections (1856–present)
