= 1986 United States House of Representatives election in the District of Columbia =

- November 4, 1986
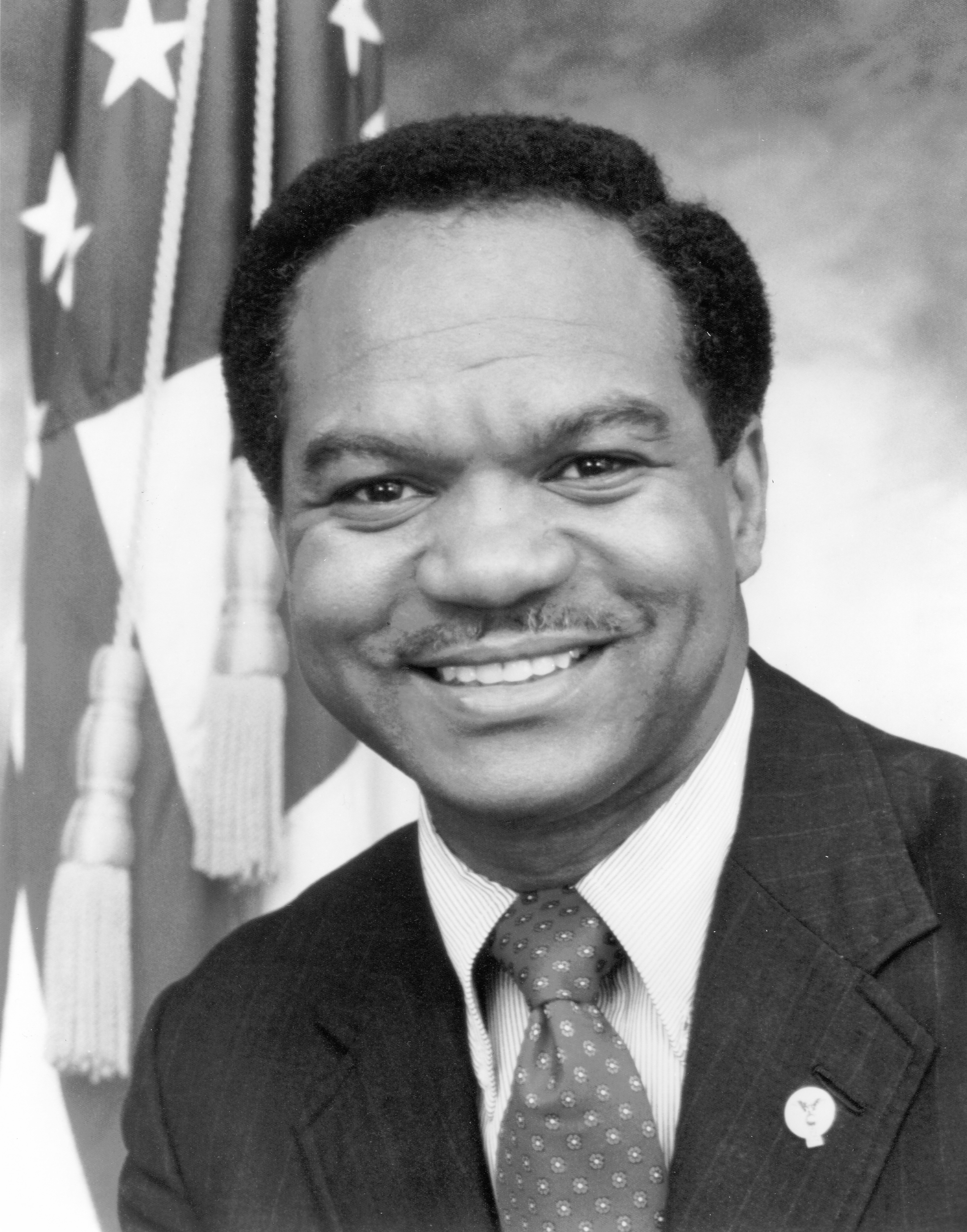

Candidate	Walter E. Fauntroy	Mary L. H. King
Party	Democratic	Republican
Popular vote	101,604	17,643
Percentage	80.09%	13.91%
Delegate before election
Walter E. Fauntroy
Democratic
Elected Delegate
Walter E. Fauntroy
Democratic

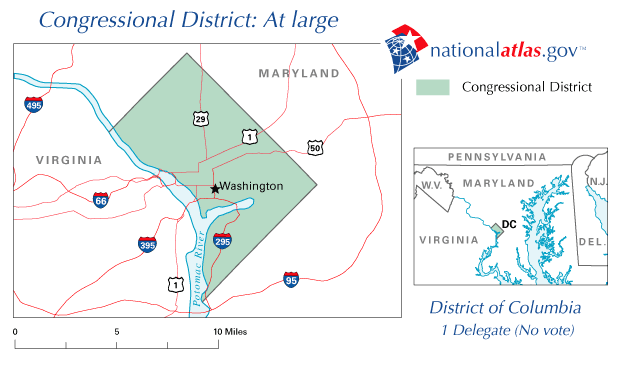
Map of the District of Columbia At-Large district.

On November 4, 1986, the District of Columbia held an election for its non-voting House delegate representing the District of Columbia's at-large congressional district. The winner of the race was Walter E. Fauntroy (D). He won his eighth re-election. All elected members would serve in 100th United States Congress.

The delegate is elected for two-year terms.

== Candidates ==
Walter E. Fauntroy, a Democrat, sought re-election for his ninth term to the United States House of Representatives. Fauntroy was opposed in this election by Republican challenger Mary King and D.C. Statehood Party candidate Julie McCall, who received 13.91% and 4.83%, respectively. This resulted in Fauntroy being elected with 80.09% of the vote.

=== Results ===
D.C. At Large Congressional District Election (1986)
Party	Candidate	Votes	%
Democratic	Walter E. Fauntroy (inc.)	101,604	80.09
Republican	Mary L. H. King	17,643	13.91
DC Statehood	Julie McCall	6,122	4.83
No party	Write-ins	1,486	1.17
Total votes		126,855	100.00
Turnout			
Democratic hold			

== See also ==
- United States House of Representatives elections in the District of Columbia
