= 1978 United States House of Representatives election in the District of Columbia =

- November 7, 1978
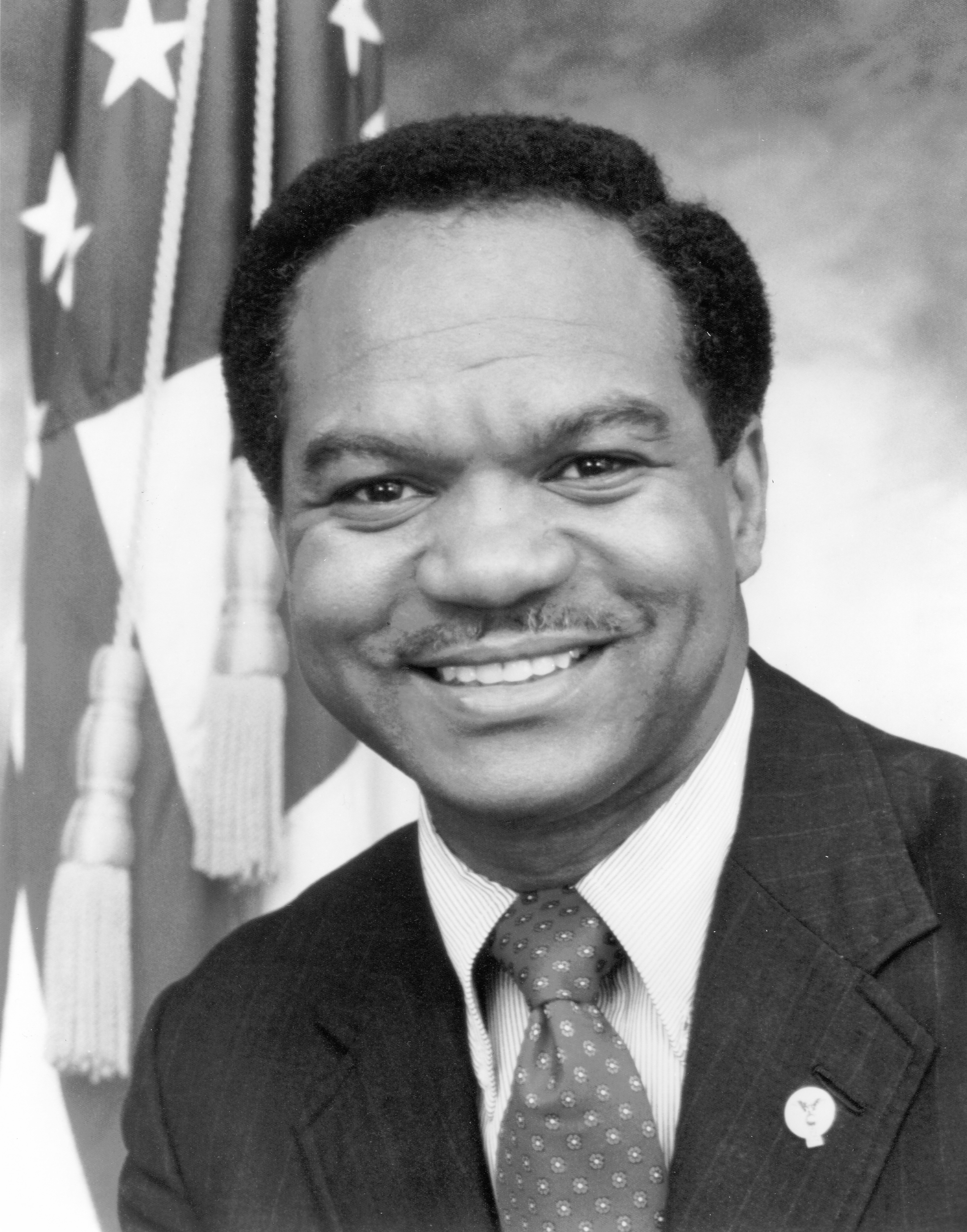

Candidate	Walter E. Fauntroy	Jackson R. Champion
Party	Democratic	Republican
Popular vote	76,557	11,677
Percentage	79.59%	12.02%
Delegate before election
Walter E. Fauntroy
Democratic
Elected Delegate
Walter E. Fauntroy
Democratic

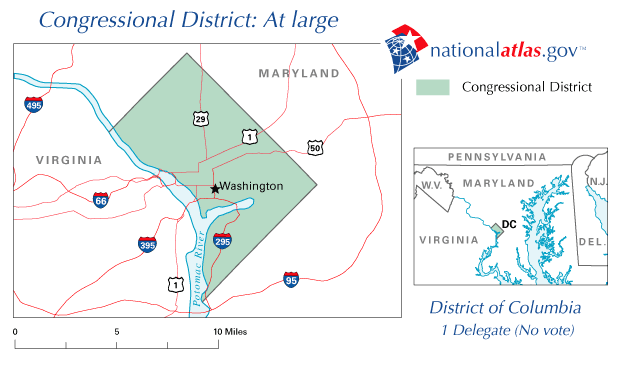
Map of the District of Columbia At-Large district.

On November 7, 1978, the District of Columbia held an election for its non-voting House delegate representing the District of Columbia's at-large congressional district. The winner of the race was Walter E. Fauntroy (D), who won his fourth re-election. All elected members would serve in 96th United States Congress.

The delegate is elected for two-year terms, as are all other Representatives and Delegates minus the Resident Commissioner of Puerto Rico, who is elected to a four-year term.

== Candidates ==
Walter E. Fauntroy, a Democrat, sought re-election for his fifth term to the United States House of Representatives. Fauntroy was opposed in this election by Republican challenger Jackson R. Champion and Statehood Party candidate Gregory Rowe who received 12.02% and 4.04%, respectively. This resulted in Fauntroy being elected with 79.59% of the vote.

=== Results ===
D.C. At Large Congressional District Election (1978)
Party	Candidate	Votes	%
Democratic	Walter E. Fauntroy (inc.)	76,557	79.59
Republican	Jackson R. Champion	11,677	12.02
DC Statehood	Gregory Rowe	3,886	4.04
Socialist Workers	Charlotte J. Reavis	1,649	1.71
American Labor	Cloid John Green	1,064	1.10
No party	Write-ins	1,473	1.53
Total votes		96,306	100.00
Turnout			
Democratic hold			

== See also ==
- United States House of Representatives elections in the District of Columbia
