= 1976 United States House of Representatives election in the District of Columbia =

- November 2, 1976
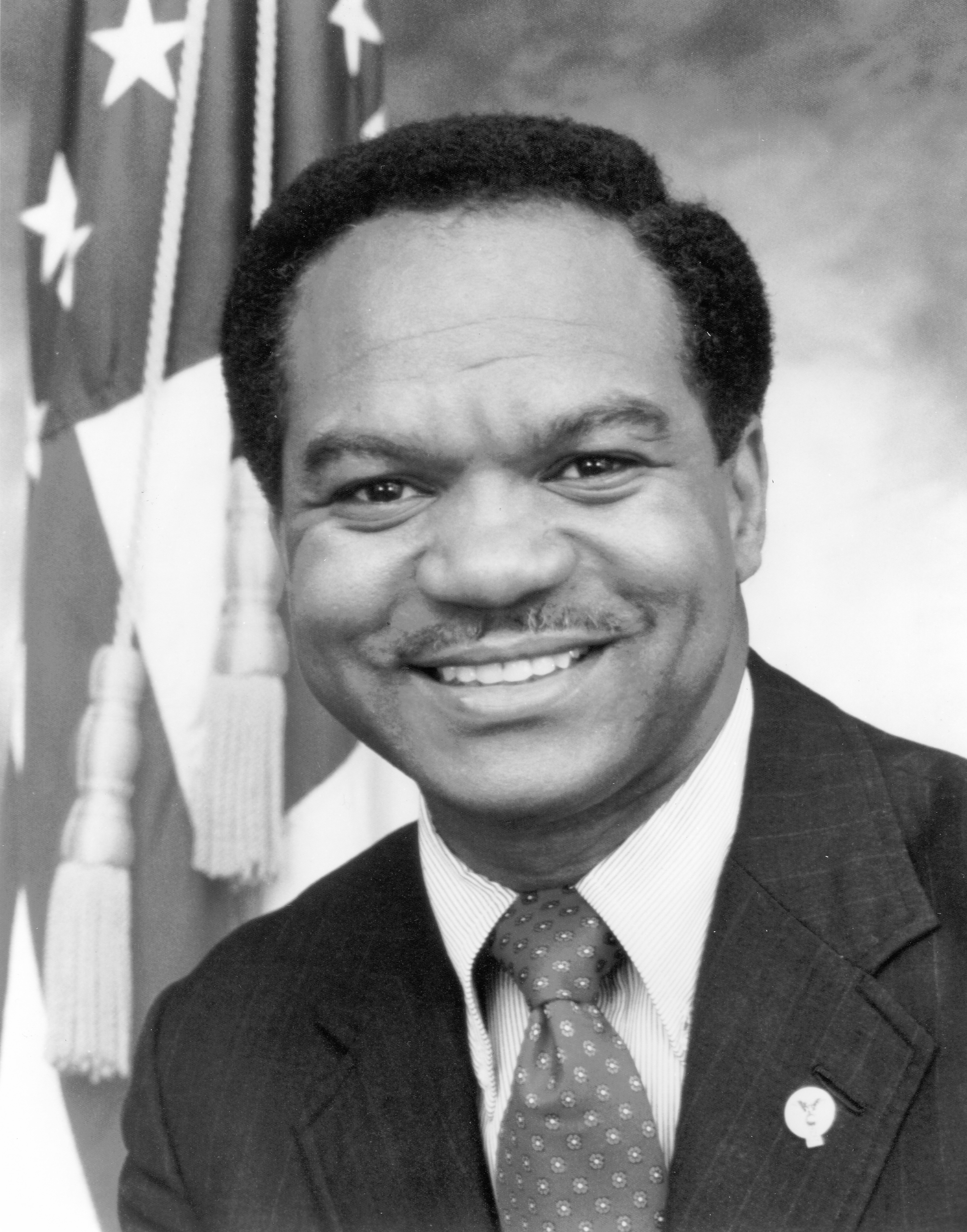

Candidate	Walter E. Fauntroy	Daniel L. Hall	Louis S. Aronica
Party	Democratic	Republican	DC Statehood
Popular vote	12,149	1,566	1,076
Percentage	77.18%	9.95%	6.84%
Delegate before election
Walter E. Fauntroy
Democratic
Elected Delegate
Walter E. Fauntroy
Democratic

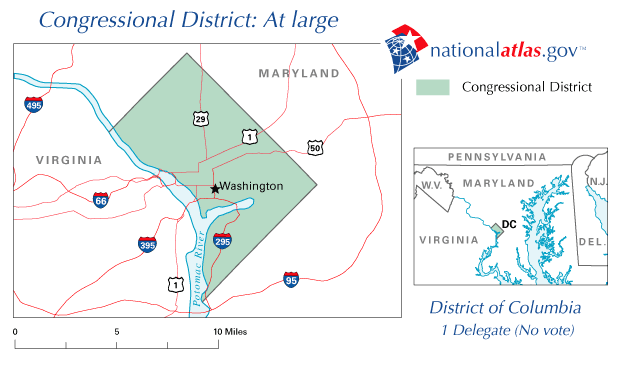
Map of the District of Columbia's at-large district

On November 2, 1976, the District of Columbia held an election for its non-voting House delegate representing the District of Columbia's at-large congressional district. The winner of the race was Walter E. Fauntroy (D), who won his third re-election. The election was notable for having a record-low turnout, as less than 16,000 voters cast their ballot in this election. This was the lowest recorded turnout for an election to this office. All elected members would serve in the 95th United States Congress.

The delegate is elected for two-year terms, as are all other representatives and delegates except the resident commissioner of Puerto Rico, who is elected to a four-year term.

== Candidates ==
Walter E. Fauntroy, a Democrat, sought re-election for his fourth term to the United States House of Representatives. Fauntroy was opposed in this election by Republican challenger Daniel L. Hall and Statehood Party candidate Louis S. Aronica, who received 9.95% and 6.84%, respectively. This resulted in Fauntroy being elected with 77.18% of the vote.

=== Results ===
D.C. at-large congressional district election (1976)
Party	Candidate	Votes	%
Democratic	Walter E. Fauntroy (inc.)	12,149	77.18
Republican	Daniel L. Hall	1,566	9.95
DC Statehood	Louis S. Aronica	1,076	6.84
Socialist Workers	Charlotte J. Reavis	499	3.17
American Labor	Susan Pennington	377	2.39
No party	Write-ins	75	0.48
Total votes		15,742	100.00
Turnout			
Democratic hold			

== See also ==
- United States House of Representatives elections in the District of Columbia
