= 1990 United States House of Representatives election in the District of Columbia =

- November 6, 1990
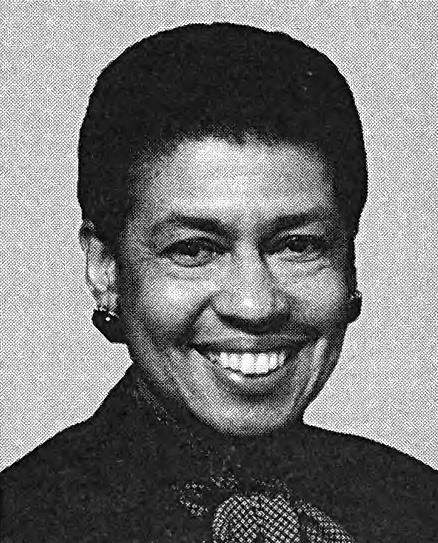

| Candidate | Eleanor Holmes Norton | Harry M. Singleton | George X. Cure |
| Party | Democratic | Republican | Independent |
| Popular vote | 98,442 | 41,999 | 8,156 |
| Percentage | 61.67% | 26.31% | 5.11% |
Delegate before election
Walter E. Fauntroy
Democratic
Elected Delegate
Eleanor Holmes Norton
Democratic

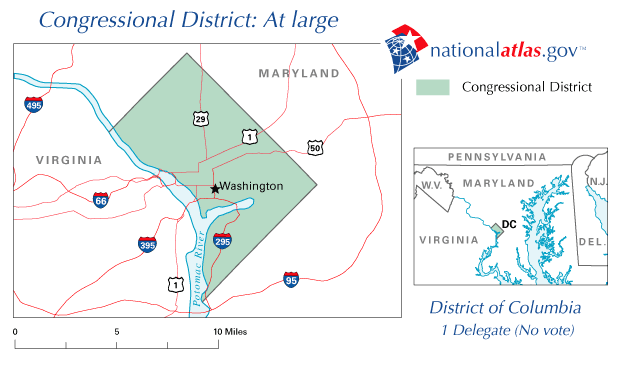
Map of the District of Columbia At-Large district.

On November 6, 1990, the District of Columbia held an election for its non-voting House delegate representing the District of Columbia's at-large congressional district. Incumbent Walter E. Fauntroy (D) had stepped down earlier to run for Mayor of Washington, D.C. Eleanor Holmes Norton (D) won the open seat. All elected members would serve in 102nd United States Congress.

The delegate is elected for two-year terms.

== Candidates ==
Eleanor Holmes Norton, a Democrat, sought election for her first term to the United States House of Representatives. Norton was opposed in this election by Republican challenger Harry M. Singleton and independent candidate George X. Cure, who received 26.31% and 5.11%, respectively. Singleton's performance was the strongest of any Republican candidate for this office so far. This resulted in Norton being elected with 61.67% of the vote.

=== Results ===
D.C. At Large Congressional District Election (1990)
| Party | Candidate | Votes | % |
|---|---|---|---|
| Democratic | Eleanor Holmes Norton | 98,442 | 61.67 |
| Republican | Harry M. Singleton | 41,999 | 26.31 |
| Independent | George X. Cure | 8,156 | 5.11 |
| DC Statehood | Leon Frederick Hunt | 4,027 | 2.52 |
| Independent | David H. Dabney | 3,334 | 2.09 |
| No party | Write-ins | 3,669 | 2.30 |
| Total votes | | 159,627 | 100.00 |
| Turnout | | | |
| Democratic hold | | | |

== See also ==
- United States House of Representatives elections in the District of Columbia
