= 1982 United States House of Representatives election in the District of Columbia =

- November 2, 1982
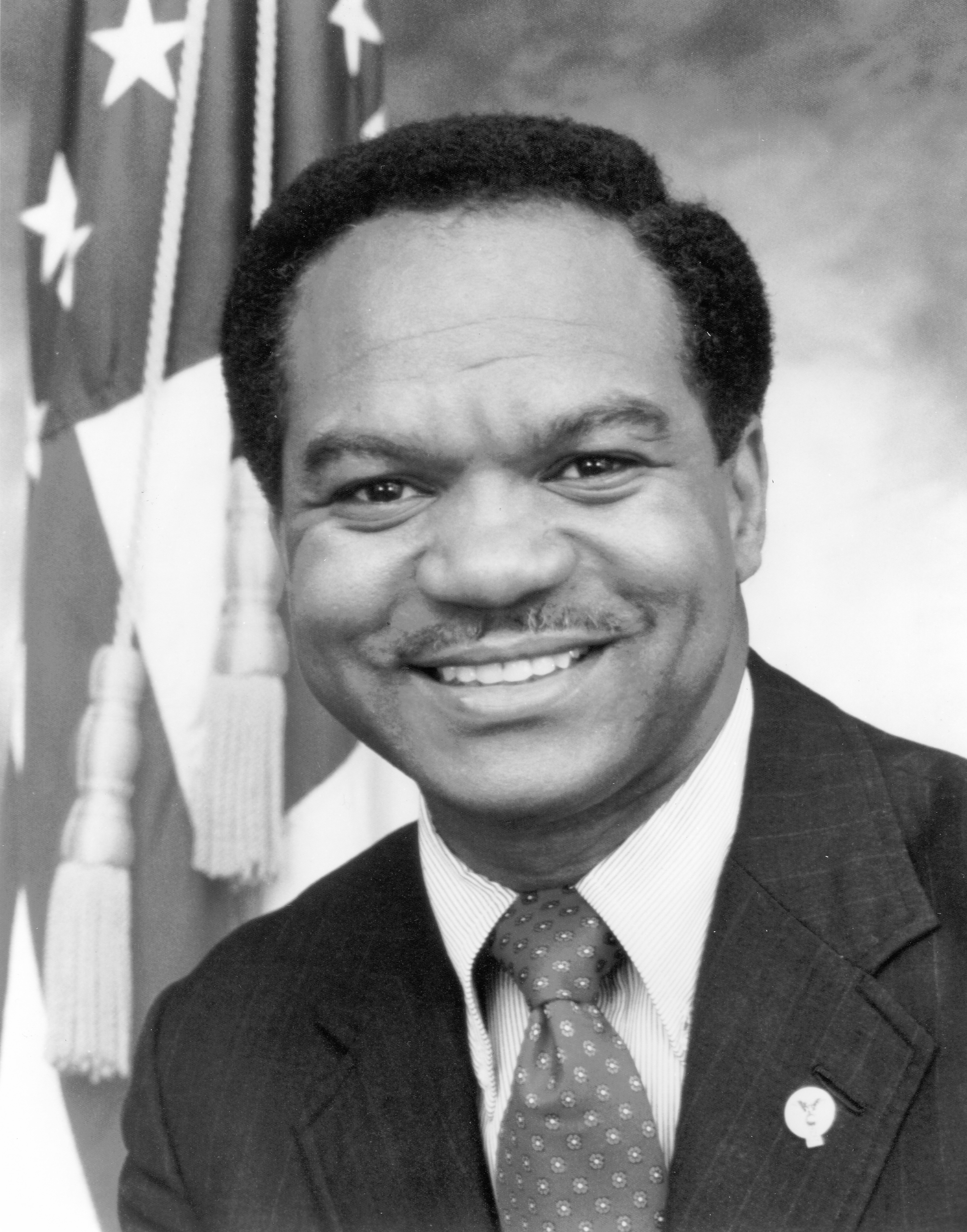

Candidate	Walter E. Fauntroy	John West
Party	Democratic	Republican
Popular vote	93,422	17,242
Percentage	83.01%	15.32%
Delegate before election
Walter E. Fauntroy
Democratic
Elected Delegate
Walter E. Fauntroy
Democratic

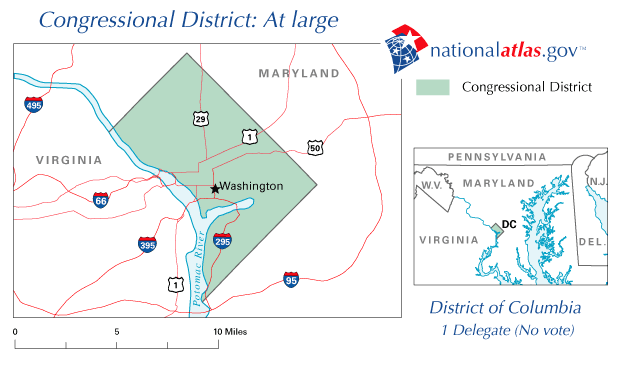
Map of the District of Columbia At-Large district.

On November 2, 1982, the District of Columbia held an election for its non-voting House delegate representing the District of Columbia's at-large congressional district. The winner of the race was Walter E. Fauntroy (D), who won his sixth re-election. All elected members would serve in 98th United States Congress.

The delegate is elected for two-year terms.

== Candidates ==
Walter E. Fauntroy, a Democrat, sought re-election for his seventh term to the United States House of Representatives. Fauntroy was opposed in this election by Republican challenger John West who received 15.32%. This resulted in Fauntroy being elected with 83.01% of the vote.

=== Results ===
D.C. At Large Congressional District Election (1982)
Party	Candidate	Votes	%
Democratic	Walter E. Fauntroy (inc.)	93,422	83.01
Republican	John West	17,242	15.32
No party	Write-ins	1,879	1.67
Total votes		112,543	100.00
Turnout			
Democratic hold			

== See also ==
- United States House of Representatives elections in the District of Columbia
