= 2012 United States Shadow Representative election in the District of Columbia =

- November 6, 2012
- Turnout: 60.9% ▲30.0 pp
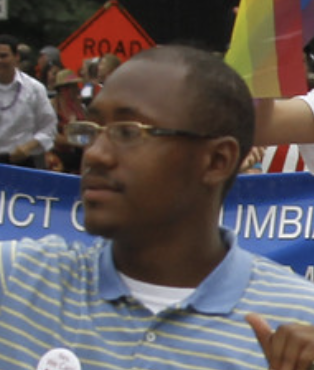

Nominee	Nate Bennett-Fleming	G. Lee Aikin
Party	Democratic	DC Statehood Green
Popular vote	206,996	31,190
Percentage	85.8%	12.9%
- Bennett-Fleming: 70–80% 80–90% >90% No votes
Representative before election
Mike Panetta
Democratic
Elected Representative
Nate Bennett-Fleming
Democratic

On November 6, 2012, the District of Columbia held a U.S. House of Representatives election for its shadow representative. Unlike its non-voting delegate, the shadow representative is only recognized by the district and is not officially sworn or seated. Incumbent Shadow Representative Mike Panetta declined to run for a fourth term. Nate Bennett-Fleming was elected in his place.

== Primary elections ==
Primary elections were held on April 3, 2012.

=== Democratic primary ===
==== Candidates ====
- Nate Bennett Fleming, Congressional fellow and candidate for Shadow Representative in 2010

==== Results ====
District of Columbia Shadow Representative Democratic primary election, 2010
Party	Candidate	Votes	%
Democratic	Nate Bennett-Fleming	43,297	96.9
Democratic	Write-ins	1,364	3.1
Total votes		44,661	100.0

=== Other primaries ===
Republican and Statehood Green primaries were held but no candidates appeared on the ballot.

== General election ==
The general election took place on November 6, 2012.

=== Results ===
General election results
Party	Candidate	Votes	%	±%
Democratic	Nate Bennett-Fleming	206,996	85.8	+3.4
DC Statehood Green	G. Lee Aikin	31,190	12.9	+5.21
Write-in		3,123	1.3	
Total votes		241,309	100.0%	
