= 2014 Washington, D.C., mayoral election =

- November 4, 2014
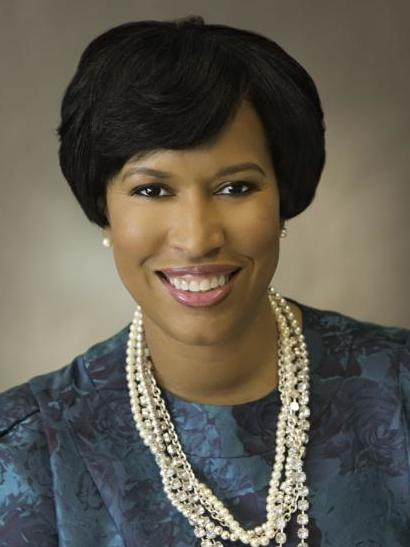

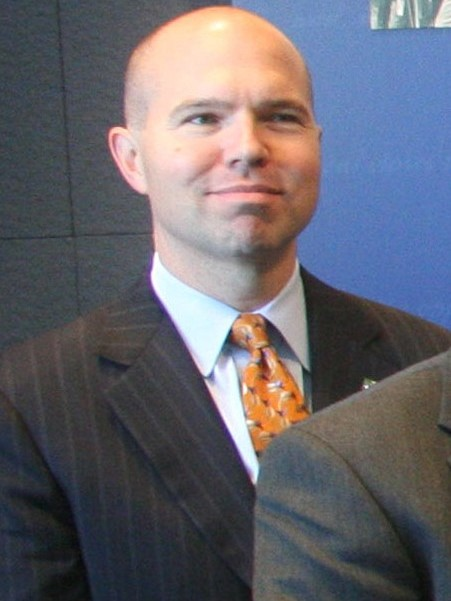

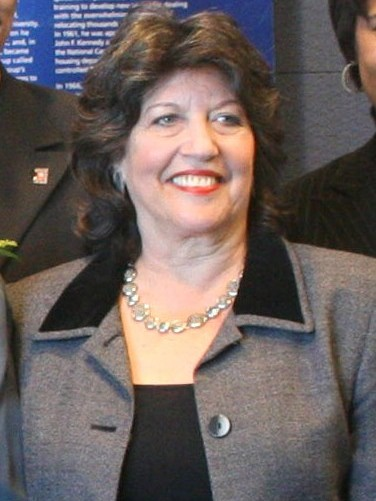
Candidate	Muriel Bowser	David Catania	Carol Schwartz
Party	Democratic	Independent	Independent
Popular vote	96,666	61,388	12,327
Percentage	54.50%	34.61%	6.95%
- Bowser: 40–50% 60–70% 70–80% 80–90% Catania: 40–50% 50–60%
Mayor before election
Vincent C. Gray
Democratic
Elected mayor
Muriel Bowser
Democratic

On November 4, 2014, Washington, D.C., held an election for its mayor, concurrently with U.S. Senate elections in various states, U.S. House elections, and various state and local elections.

Incumbent Democratic Mayor Vincent C. Gray ran for re-election to a second term but was defeated in the April 1 primary by Ward 4 District Councilwoman Muriel Bowser. Bowser went on to win the general election against independent candidates David Catania and Carol Schwartz.

== Democratic primary ==
=== Candidates ===
==== Declared ====
- Carlos Allen, musician and promoter
- Muriel Bowser, Ward 4 District Councilwoman
- Jack Evans, Ward 2 District Councilman
- Vincent C. Gray, incumbent mayor
- Michael J. Green, candidate for Ward 4 District Councilmember in 2007 and write-in candidate for Mayor in 2010
- Reta Jo Lewis, former State Department official
- Vincent Orange, at-large District Councilman
- Andy Shallal, artist, activist, and proprietor of Busboys and Poets
- Tommy Wells, Ward 6 District Councilman

==== Withdrew ====
- Christian A. Carter, businessman (withdrew January 18, 2014)

==== Declined ====
- Robert Bobb, former city administrator
- Adrian Fenty, former mayor
- Eric W. Price, former Deputy Mayor
- Anthony A. Williams, former mayor

=== Endorsements ===
Muriel Bowser
- EMILY's List
- The Washington Post editorial board
Jack Evans
- The Downtowner editorial board
- George Washington University College Democrats
- International Association of Machinists and Aerospace Workers, District of Columbia and Maryland State Council
- The InTowner
Vincent C. Gray

Individuals

- Marion Barry

Organizations

- American Federation of Government Employees, District 14
- American Federation of State, County and Municipal Employees, District Council 20
- District of Columbia Asian American & Pacific Islanders Democratic Caucus
- District of Columbia Chamber of Commerce
- District of Columbia Latino Caucus
- Hotel Organization to Elect Leaders
- Laborers' International Union of North America, Mid-Atlantic Region
- Service Employees International Union, District of Columbia/Maryland Council
- Teamsters Local 639, Local 730, and Local 67
- Unite Here, Local 25
- Washington D.C. Building and Construction Trades Council
- The Washington Informer editorial board
Vincent Orange
- National Nurses United
- United Food and Commercial Workers, Local 400
Tommy Wells
- District of Columbia Firefighters Association, Local 36
- Fraternal Order of Police, Metropolitan Police Department Labor Committee
- The Georgetown Voice editorial board
- Greater Greater Washington editorial board
- National Organization of Women, DC Chapter
- NORML PAC

=== Polling ===
Poll source	Date(s) administered	Sample size	Margin of error	Vincent C. Gray	Muriel Bowser	Jack Evans	Reta Jo Lewis	Vincent Orange	Andy Shallal	Tommy Wells	Other	Undecided
The Washington Post	March 20–23, 2014	391	± 6.5%	27%	30%	6%	3%	3%	6%	14%	2% (Note: Carlos Allen 1%, Other 1%)	9%
Marist	March 19–23, 2014	441	± 4.7%	26%	28%	9%	2%	4%	4%	11%	2% (Note: Carlos Allen <1%, Other 1%)	15%
Public Policy Polling	March 13–16, 2014	860	± 3.3%	27%	27%	13%	1%	2%	7%	9%	—	14%
Marist	February 17–23, 2014	416	± 4.8%	28%	20%	13%	3%	4%	6%	12%	2% (Note: Carlos Allen <1%, Other 1%)	12%
The Washington Post	January 9–12, 2014	669	± 5%	24%	12%	11%	1%	9%	5%	11%	4% (Note: Christian A. Carter 1%, Other 3%)	23%
GarinHartYang^	January 6–9, 2014	502	± 4.4%	20%	18%	15%	—	6%	3%	15%	—	23%
Lake Research Partners*	June 27–July 1, 2013	503	± 4.4%	21%	17%	13%	—	—	—	16%	—	31%

- ^ Internal poll for the Muriel Bowser campaign
- * Internal poll for the Tommy Wells campaign

=== Results ===

Bowser

30–40%
40–50%
50–60%
60–70%

Gray

40–50%
50–60%

Bowser

30–40%
40–50%
50–60%
60–70%
70–80%

Gray

30–40%
40–50%
50–60%
60–70%
70–80%

Wells

30–40%
40–50%

Other

40-50% tie

District of Columbia Democratic primary election, 2014
Party	Candidate	Votes	%
Democratic	Muriel Bowser	42,045	43.38
Democratic	Vincent C. Gray (incumbent)	31,613	32.62
Democratic	Tommy Wells	12,393	12.79
Democratic	Jack Evans	4,877	5.03
Democratic	Andy Shallal	3,196	3.3
Democratic	Vincent Orange	1,946	2.01
Democratic	Reta Jo Lewis	490	0.51
Democratic	Carlos Allen	120	0.12
Democratic	Write-in	235	0.24
Total votes		96,915	100

== Republican primary ==
The District of Columbia Republican Party said it might appoint a candidate to run in the general election. However, since it did not do so by September 8, 2014, no Republican candidate appeared on the general election ballot.

=== Candidates ===
==== Withdrew ====
- Kris Hammond, attorney and former Advisory Neighborhood Commissioner

==== Declined ====
- Michael Powell, former chairman of the Federal Communications Commission
- Carol Schwartz, former at-large District Councilwoman and four-time mayoral candidate (ran as an independent)

=== Results ===
District of Columbia Republican primary election, 2014
Party	Candidate	Votes	%
Republican	Write-in	717	100
Total votes		717	100

== Libertarian primary ==
=== Candidates ===
==== Declared ====
- Bruce Majors, real estate agent and nominee for U.S. Delegate in 2012

=== Results ===
District of Columbia Libertarian primary election, 2014
Party	Candidate	Votes	%
Libertarian	Bruce Majors	30	90.91
Libertarian	Write-in	3	9.09
Total votes		33	100

== D.C. Statehood Green primary ==
=== Candidates ===
==== Declared ====
- Faith Dane, perennial candidate

=== Results ===
District of Columbia Green primary election, 2014
Party	Candidate	Votes	%
DC Statehood Green	Faith Dane	191	47.63
DC Statehood Green	Write-in	210	52.37
Total votes		401	100

== Independent ==
=== Candidates ===
==== Declared ====
- David Catania, independent at-large D.C. Councillor
- Carol Schwartz, former Republican at-large D.C. Councillor and candidate for mayor in 1986, 1994, 1998 and 2002

==== Withdrew ====
- Nestor Djonkam, engineer and Democratic candidate for mayor in 2006
- Ben Foshager (write-in)

==== Disqualified ====
- James M. Caviness
- Michael T. Green
- David O. Leacraft-EL
- Frank E. Sewell

==== Declined ====
- John Hill, CFO of Detroit, former CEO of the Federal City Council and former executive director of the District of Columbia Financial Control Board
- Marie Johns, Deputy Administrator of the Small Business Administration and candidate for Mayor in 2006
- Cathy L. Lanier, Chief of Police for the Metropolitan Police Department of the District of Columbia
- Kathleen Patterson, former Ward 3 District Councilwoman

== General election ==
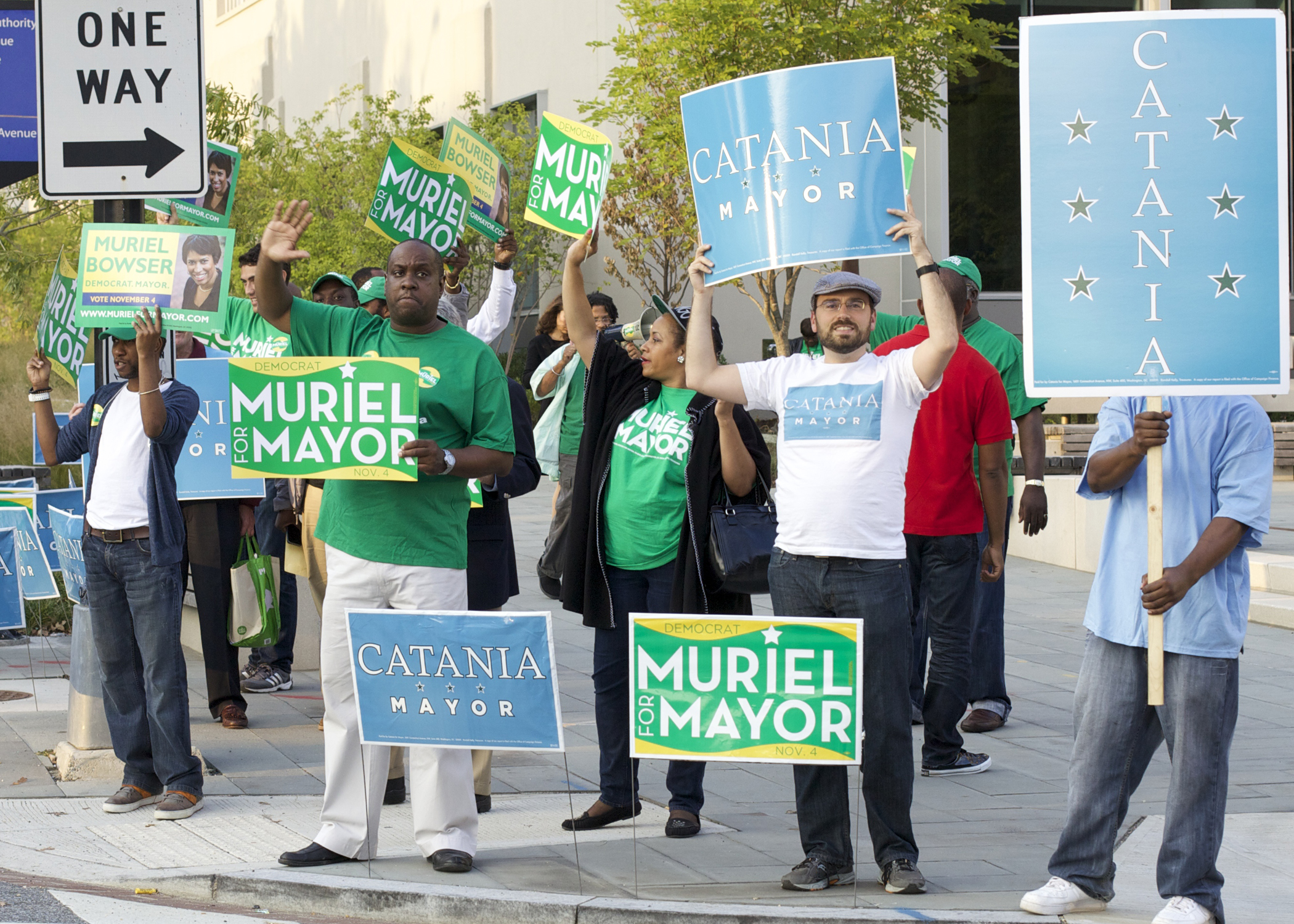
Supporters of Muriel Bowser and David Catania rally outside before a debate.

=== Polling ===
Poll source	Date(s) administered	Sample size	Margin of error	Muriel Bowser (D)	David Catania (I)	Carol Schwartz (I)	Other	Undecided
Ron Lester*	September/October, 2014	500	± ?	34%	30%	16%	—	19%
Economic Growth D.C.	September 28–30, 2014	1,023	± 3%	35%	27%	11%	—	27%
Economic Growth D.C.	September 28–30, 2014	1,023	± 3%	43%	33%	—	—	24%
Marist	September 14–16, 2014	572	± 4%	43%	26%	16%	1%	14%
Marist	September 14–16, 2014	572	± 4%	50%	33%	—	1%	16%
Marist	September 14–16, 2014	572	± 4%	55%	—	25%	2%	18%
The Washington Post	March 20–23, 2014	1,102	± 4%	56%	23%	—	1%	21%
Marist	March 19–23, 2014	532	± 4.2%	46%	26%	—	—	28%

- * Internal poll for the Karl Racine campaign for attorney general
Hypothetical polling

Poll source	Date(s) administered	Sample size	Margin of error	Vincent C. Gray (D)	David Catania (I)	Other	Undecided
The Washington Post	March 20–23, 2014	1,102	± 4%	41%	41%	1%	17%
Marist	March 19–23, 2014	569	± 4.1%	43%	37%	—	20%
The Washington Post	January 9–12, 2014	1,003	± 4%	43%	38%	1%	18%

=== Results ===
Washington, D.C. mayoral election, 2014
Party	Candidate	Votes	%
Democratic	Muriel Bowser	96,666	54.50
Independent	David Catania	61,388	34.61
Independent	Carol Schwartz	12,327	6.95
DC Statehood Green	Faith Dane	1,520	0.86
Libertarian	Bruce Majors	1,297	0.73
Write-in		1,612	0.91
Over Votes	Other	95	0.05
Under Votes	Other	1,993	1.12
Total votes		177,358	100.00
Democratic hold			
