= 1990 Washington, D.C., mayoral election =

- November 6, 1990
- Turnout: 26.8%
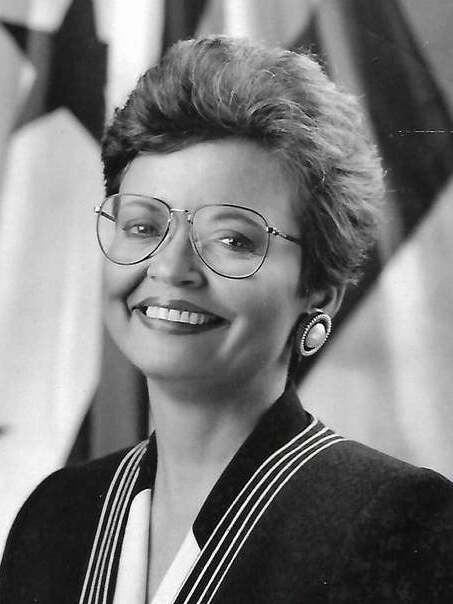

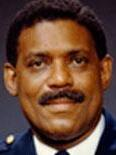
Nominee	Sharon Pratt Dixon	Maurice Turner
Party	Democratic	Republican
Popular vote	92,504	18,653
Percentage	86.12%	11.47%
- Dixon: 60–70% 70–80% 80–90% >90%
Mayor before election
Marion Barry
Democratic
Elected mayor
Sharon Pratt Dixon
Democratic

On November 6, 1990, Washington, D.C., held an election for its mayor, with Democratic candidate Sharon Pratt Dixon defeating Republican Maurice Turner.

Sharon Pratt Dixon announced at the 1988 Democratic National Convention that she would challenge incumbent mayor Marion Barry in the 1990 election. Pratt was the only candidate to have officially announced her plans to run for mayor when Barry was arrested on drug charges and dropped out of the race in early 1990. Shortly thereafter, the race was joined by longtime councilmembers John Ray, Charlene Drew Jarvis and David Clarke. Pratt criticized her three main opponents, referring to them as the "three blind mice" who "saw nothing, said nothing and did nothing as the city rapidly decayed." She was the only candidate who called on Barry to resign from office, and ran specifically as an outsider to his political machine with the campaign slogan of "Clean House."

Following a series of televised debates during the last few weeks of the campaign, Pratt received the endorsement of The Washington Post. The day the endorsement appeared, her poll numbers skyrocketed, with many political observers attributing the rise specifically to the Post's backing. On the eve of the election, polls showed Councilmember John Ray holding the lead, but Pratt gaining ground fast and a large margin of undecided voters remaining. However, even with the smallest campaign staff and least money, Pratt won the election, defeating second-place Ray by 10%. As Washington is a heavily Democratic city, Dixon's victory over Republican former police chief Maurice T. Turner, Jr., in the November 6 general election was a foregone conclusion.

== Democratic primary ==
District of Columbia Democratic primary election, 1990
Party	Candidate	Votes	%
Democratic	Sharon Pratt Dixon	43,426	34.37
Democratic	John L. Ray	32,255	25.53
Democratic	Charlene Drew Jarvis	27,063	21.44
Democratic	David A. Clarke	13,768	10.9
Democratic	Walter E. Fauntroy	9,261	7.33
Democratic	Write-in	555	0.43
Total votes		126,348	100

== General election ==
District of Columbia mayoral election, 1990
Party	Candidate	Votes	%
Democratic	Sharon Pratt Dixon	140,011	86.12
Republican	Maurice Turner	18,653	11.47
DC Statehood	Alvin C. Frost	1,116	0.69
Libertarian	Nancy Lord	951	0.59
Independent	Mary E. Cox	640	0.39
Independent	Brian P. Moore	310	0.19
Independent	Bernell Brooks	292	0.18
Independent	Thomas B. Carter	186	0.11
Socialist Workers	Ike Nahem	177	0.11
Independent	Osie Thorpe	134	0.08
Independent	Faith Dane	110	0.07
Total votes		162,580	100
Democratic hold			
