= 2014 United States House of Representatives election in the District of Columbia =

- November 4, 2014
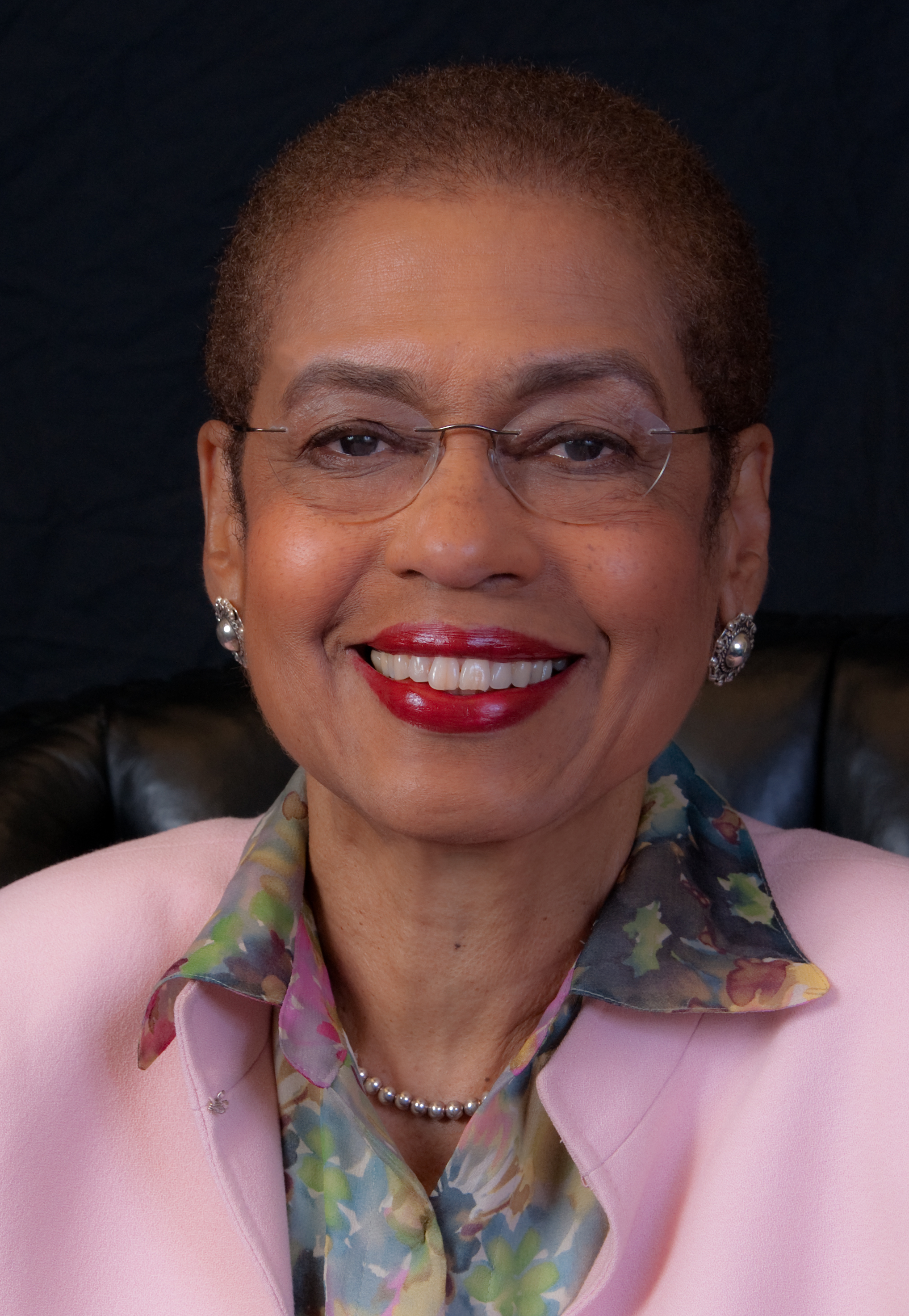

Candidate	Eleanor Holmes Norton	Nelson F. Rimensnyder	Tim Krepp
Party	Democratic	Republican	Independent
Popular vote	143,923	11,673	9,101
Percentage	83.73%	6.79%	5.29%
- Norton: 50–60% 60–70% 70–80% 80–90% >90% No votes
Delegate before election
Eleanor Holmes Norton
Democratic
Elected Delegate
Eleanor Holmes Norton
Democratic

On November 4, 2014, the District of Columbia held an election for its non-voting House delegate representing the District of Columbia's at-large congressional district. The election coincided with the elections of other federal, state and local offices.

The non-voting delegate is elected for two-year terms. Democrat Eleanor Holmes Norton, who has represented the district since 1991, won re-election to a thirteenth term in office.

== Primary results ==
District of Columbia Democratic primary election, 2014
Party	Candidate	Votes	%
Democratic	Eleanor Holmes Norton (incumbent)	87,247	97.05
Democratic	Write-in	2,652	2.95
Total votes		89,899	100

District of Columbia Republican primary election, 2014
Party	Candidate	Votes	%
Republican	Nelson F. Rimensnyder	1,131	89.83
Republican	Write-in	128	10.17
Total votes		1,259	100

D.C. Statehood Green primary election, 2014
Party	Candidate	Votes	%
DC Statehood Green	Natale L. Stracuzzi	323	79.56
DC Statehood Green	Write-in	83	20.44
Total votes		401	100

== General election ==
=== Candidates ===
- Eleanor Holmes Norton (Democratic), incumbent Delegate
- Nelson F. Rimensnyder (Republican)
- Natale L. Stracuzzi (D.C. Statehood Green)
- Tim Krepp (independent), tour guide

=== Results ===
Washington, D.C. at-large congressional district, 2014
Party	Candidate	Votes	%	±%
Democratic	Eleanor Holmes Norton (incumbent)	143,923	83.73%	−4.82%
Republican	Nelson F. Rimensnyder	11,673	6.79%	N/A
Independent	Tim Krepp	9,101	5.29%	N/A
DC Statehood Green	Natale L. Stracuzzi	6,073	3.53%	−1.22%
Write-in		1,123	0.65%	-0.12%
Total votes		171,893	100.0%	N/A
Democratic hold				

== See also ==
- United States House of Representatives elections in the District of Columbia
