= 2020 District of Columbia elections =

- Turnout: 66.90%

On November 3, 2020, the District of Columbia held elections for several local and federal government offices. Its primary elections were held on June 2, 2020.

In addition to the U.S. presidential race voters elected one of its two shadow senators, its nonvoting member of the House of Representatives, its Shadow congressperson to the House of Representatives, and 6 of 13 seats on the council. There is also one ballot measure which was voted on.

== Federal elections ==
=== President of the United States ===
Washington, D.C., has 3 electoral votes in the Electoral College. The district has leaned heavily Democratic in each presidential election since 1964, the first one in which its population was able to vote.

2020 United States presidential election in the District of Columbia
Party	Candidate	Votes	%
Democratic	Joe Biden	317,323	92.15
Republican	Donald Trump (incumbent)	18,586	5.40
Libertarian	Jo Jorgensen	2,036	0.59
DC Statehood Green	Howie Hawkins	1,726	0.50
Independent	Gloria La Riva	855	0.25
Independent	Brock Pierce	693	0.20
Write-in		3,137	0.91
Total votes		344,356	100.00

=== United States House of Representatives ===
Eleanor Holmes Norton ran for re-election as a non-voting delegate to the House of Representatives.

2020 United States House of Representatives election in the District of Columbia
Party	Candidate	Votes	%
Democratic	Eleanor Holmes Norton (incumbent)	281,831	86.30
Libertarian	Patrick Hynes	9,678	2.96
Independent	Barbara Washington Franklin	7,628	2.34
Socialist Workers	Omari Musa	6,702	2.05
DC Statehood Green	Natale Lino Stracuzzi	5,553	1.70
Independent	David Krucoff	5,017	1.54
Independent	Amir Lowery	5,001	1.53
Independent	John Cheeks	2,914	0.89
Write-in		2,263	0.69
Total votes		326,587	100.00
Democratic hold			

=== Shadow Senator ===
Incumbent Paul Strauss was re-elected to a sixth term as a shadow senator.

2020 United States Shadow Senator election in the District of Columbia
Party	Candidate	Votes	%
Democratic	Paul Strauss (incumbent)	251,991	81.17
DC Statehood Green	Eleanor Ory	31,151	10.03
Republican	Cornelia Weiss	24,168	7.78
Write-in		3,154	1.02
Total votes		310,464	100.00
Democratic hold			

=== Shadow Representative ===
Incumbent Franklin Garcia declined to run for re-election. Democrat Oye Owolewa, independent Sohaer Syed, and Statehood Green Joyce Robinson-Paul competed for his open seat.

2020 United States Shadow Representative election in the District of Columbia
Party	Candidate	Votes	%
Democratic	Oye Owolewa	240,533	81.60
DC Statehood Green	Joyce Robinson-Paul	27,128	9.20
Independent	Sohaer Rizvi Syed	22,771	7.72
Write-in		4,341	1.47
Total votes		294,773	100.00
Democratic hold			

== District elections ==
=== Council ===
The 2020 general election for Council of the District of Columbia was held on November 3, with a special election for ward 2 held on June 27. Elections were held for the seats of four out of the eight wards and two of the four at-large seats. The Democratic Party retained its control of the city council, with the council becaming majority female for the first time since the 1998 election.

Ward 2 councilmember Jack Evans resigned from the city council due to a corruption scandal, triggering a special election. Despite resigning, Evans unsuccessfully ran for his seat in the Democratic primary, which was won by Brooke Pinto. Incumbent councilors Robert White, Pinto, Vincent C. Gray, and Trayon White won reelection. Janeese Lewis George won election to the city council after defeating incumbent councilor Brandon Todd, while David Grosso retired and was succeeded by Christina Henderson.

This was the first city council election to have public campaign financing with $3.4 million being given to candidates, with George being given the most at $281,055 during the campaign.

=== Ballot measure ===
Initiative 81, titled the Entheogenic Plants and Fungus Policy Act of 2020, aims to decriminalize noncommercial cultivation, distribution and possession of psychedelic plants, including psilocybin mushrooms, iboga, cacti containing mescaline, and ayahuasca.

==== Polling ====
Poll source	Date(s) administered	Sample size (Note: Key: A – all adults RV – registered voters LV – likely voters V – unclear)	Margin of error	For Initiative 81	Against Initiative 81	Undecided
FM3 Research/Campaign to Decriminalize Nature DC (Note: Poll sponsored by Campaign to Decrminalize Nature D.C., which had supported the initiative prior to the poll's sampling period)	August 16–24, 2020	620 (LV)	± 4%	60%	24%	16%
FM3 Research/Campaign to Decriminalize Nature DC	March – April, 2020	– (V) (Note: Not yet released)	–	51%	27%	22%

==== Result ====
Initiative Measure No. 81 Entheogenic Plants and Fungus Policy Act
Choice	Votes	%
For	214,685	76.18
Against	67,140	23.82
Total	281,825	100.00
Registered voters/turnout	517,890	54.42

== Notes ==
Partisan clients
