= 2018 United States House of Representatives election in the District of Columbia =

- November 6, 2018
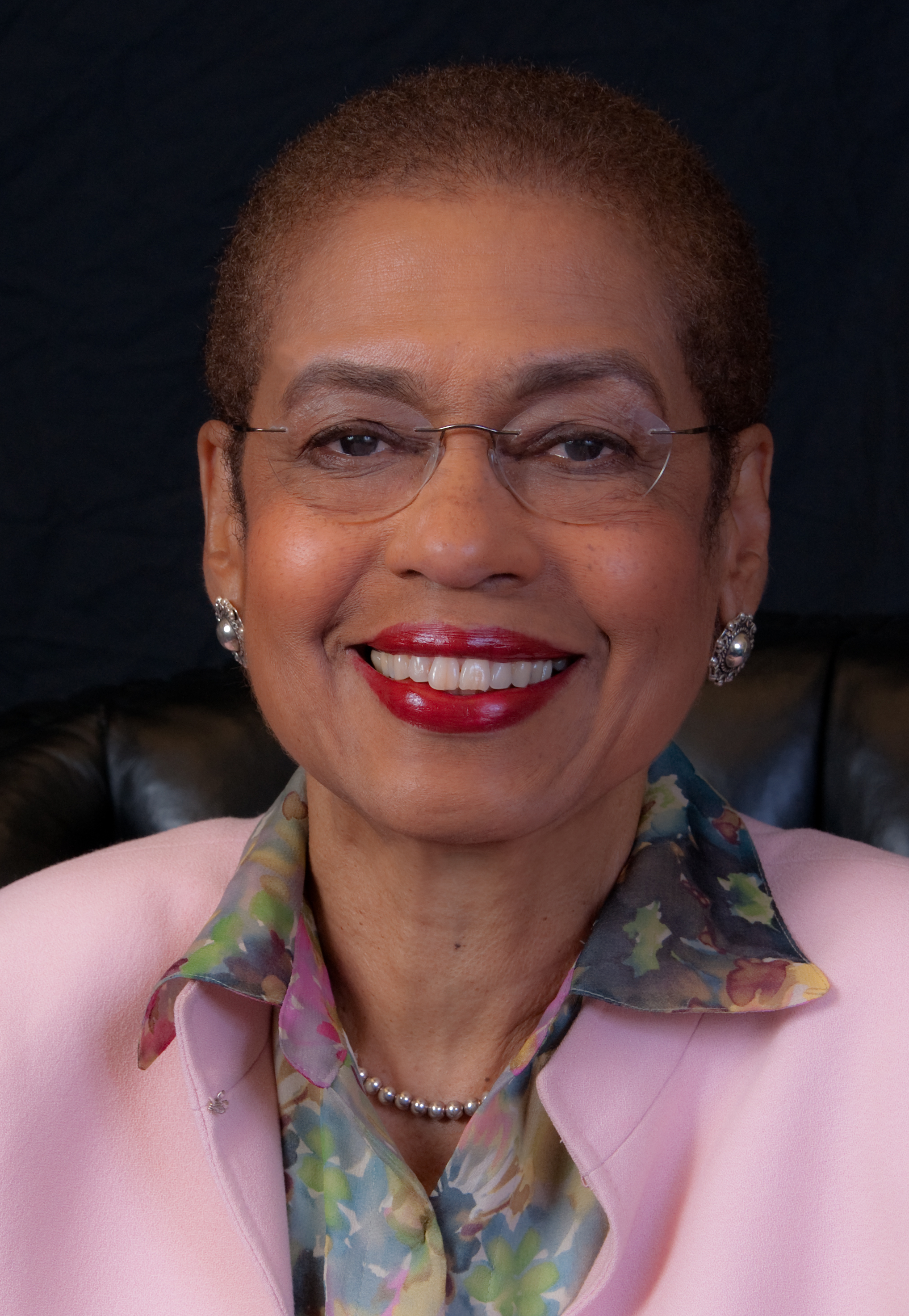

| Nominee | Eleanor Holmes Norton | Nelson F. Remensynder |
| Party | Democratic | Republican |
| Popular vote | 199,124 | 9,700 |
| Percentage | 87.04% | 4.24% |
- Holmes-Norton: 60–70% 70–80% 80–90% >90%
Delegate before election
Eleanor Holmes Norton
Democratic
Elected Delegate
Eleanor Holmes Norton
Democratic

On November 6, 2018, the District of Columbia held an election for its non-voting House delegate representing the District of Columbia's at-large congressional district. The election coincided with the 2018 elections of other federal, state, and local offices.

The non-voting delegate is elected for a two-year term. Democrat Eleanor Holmes Norton, the incumbent delegate first elected in 1990, was re-elected for a 15th consecutive term.

== Primary election ==
The primary election for party nominee was held on June 19, 2018.

=== Democratic primary ===
Incumbent Delegate Eleanor Holmes Norton faced her first primary challenge since 2010. Her opponent in the primary was Kim Ford, a former Obama administration official. Holmes Norton defeated Ford with 76.5% to Ford's 22.9% in the Democratic primary on June 19, 2018.

=== Candidates ===
- Kim Ford, former Obama administration official
- Eleanor Holmes Norton, incumbent Delegate to the United States House of Representatives

==== Democratic primary results ====
Results by ward: Holmes Norton—80–90% Holmes Norton—70–80%

Democratic primary results
| Party | Candidate | Votes | % |
|---|---|---|---|
| Democratic | Eleanor Holmes Norton (inc.) | 60,842 | 76.5 |
| Democratic | Kim R. Ford | 18,178 | 22.9 |
| Democratic | Write-ins | 515 | 0.7 |
| Total votes | | 79,535 | 100.0 |

=== Candidates ===
- Nelson Rimensnyder, community activist

=== Libertarian primary ===
==== Candidates ====
- Bruce Majors, Libertarian activist, ran unopposed for his party's nomination

==== Libertarian primary results ====
Results by ward: Majors—100% Majors—>90% Majors—80–90% Majors—60–70%

Libertarian primary results
| Party | Candidate | Votes | % |
|---|---|---|---|
| Libertarian | Bruce Majors | 111 | 90.2 |
| Libertarian | Write-ins | 12 | 9.8 |
| Total votes | | 123 | 100.0 |

=== Candidates ===
- Natalie "Lino" Stracuzzi

==== Green Party primary results ====
Results by ward: Stracuzzi—>90% Stracuzzi—80–90% Stracuzzi—70–80% Stracuzzi—60–70%

Green primary results
| Party | Candidate | Votes | % |
|---|---|---|---|
| DC Statehood Green | Natalie "Lino" Stracuzzi | 368 | 82.0 |
| DC Statehood Green | Write-ins | 81 | 18.0 |
| Total votes | | 449 | 100.0 |

=== Independent candidates ===
- John Cheeks, businessman

== General election ==
The election for Delegate for House of Representatives was held on Tuesday, November 6, 2018.

=== Results ===
Washington D.C.'s at-large congressional district, 2018
| Party | Candidate | Votes | % | ±% |
|---|---|---|---|---|
| Democratic | Eleanor Holmes Norton (incumbent) | 199,124 | 87.04% | −1.09% |
| Republican | Nelson F. Rimensnyder | 9,700 | 4.24% | +4.24% |
| DC Statehood Green | Natalie "Lino" Stracuzzi | 8,636 | 3.77% | −0.99% |
| Independent | John Cheeks | 5,509 | 2.41% | N/A |
| Libertarian | Bruce Majors | 4,034 | 1.76% | −4.46% |
| n/a | Write-ins | 1,766 | 0.77% | −0.12% |
| Total votes | | 228,769 | 100.0% | N/A |
| Democratic hold | | | | |

== See also ==
- United States House of Representatives elections in the District of Columbia
