= 1984 United States House of Representatives election in the District of Columbia =

- November 6, 1984
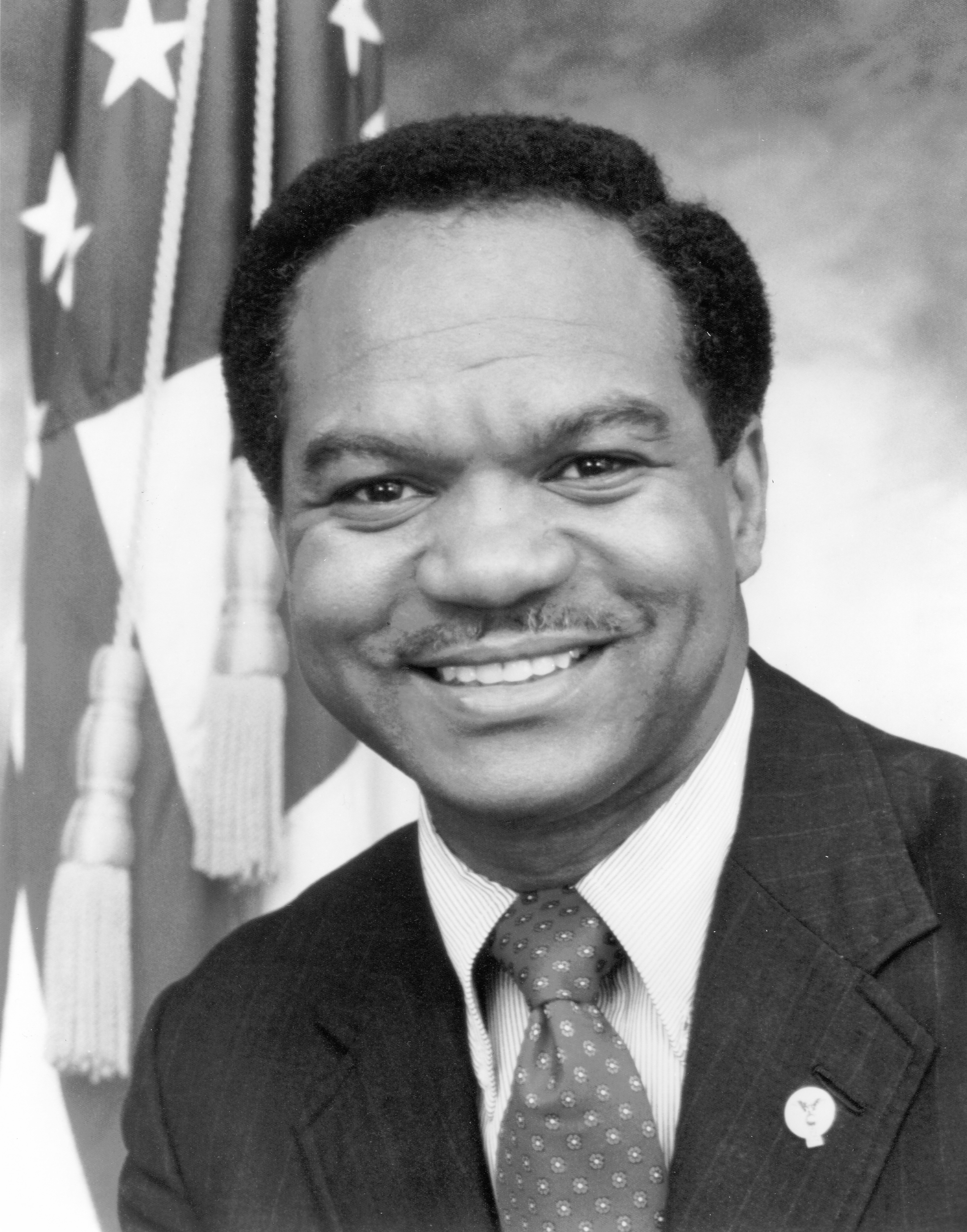
Candidate	Walter E. Fauntroy
Party	Democratic
Popular vote	154,583
Percentage	95.56%
Delegate before election
Walter E. Fauntroy
Democratic
Elected Delegate
Walter E. Fauntroy
Democratic

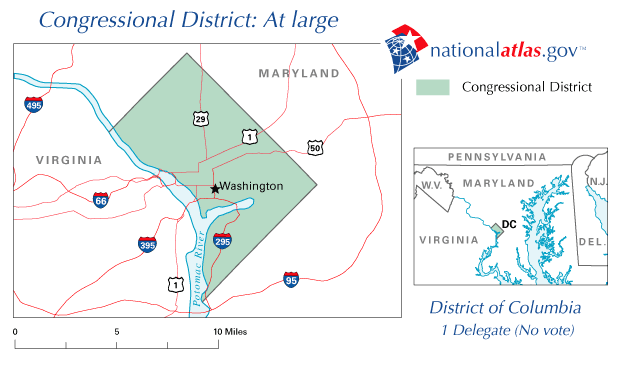
Map of the District of Columbia At-Large district.

On November 6, 1984, the District of Columbia held an election for its non-voting House delegate representing the District of Columbia's at-large congressional district. The winner of the race was Walter E. Fauntroy (D), who won his seventh re-election. All elected members would serve in 99th United States Congress.

The delegate is elected for two-year terms.

== Candidates ==
Walter E. Fauntroy, a Democrat, sought re-election for his eighth term to the United States House of Representatives. Fauntroy was completely unopposed in this election, although some voters still chose to write in other names. Fauntroy was nevertheless re-elected with over 95% of the vote.

=== Results ===
D.C. At Large Congressional District Election (1984)
Party	Candidate	Votes	%
Democratic	Walter E. Fauntroy (inc.)	154,583	95.56
No party	Write-ins	7,188	4.44
Total votes		161,771	100.00
Turnout			
Democratic hold			

== See also ==
- United States House of Representatives elections in the District of Columbia
