= 2016 United States House of Representatives election in the District of Columbia =

- November 8, 2016
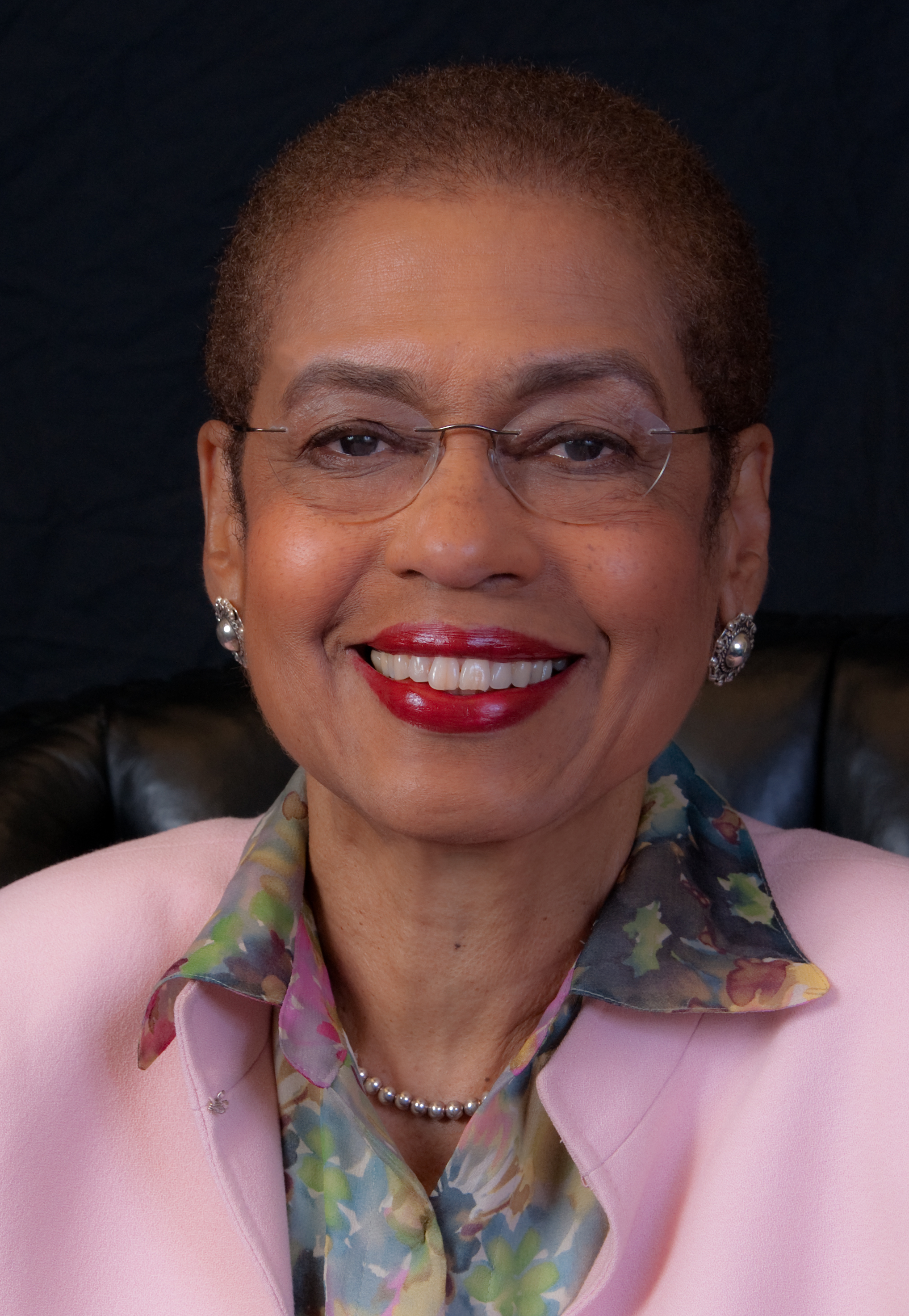

Candidate	Eleanor Holmes Norton	Martin Moulton
Party	Democratic	Libertarian
Popular vote	265,178	18,713
Percentage	88.14%	6.22%
- Norton: 70–80% 80–90% >90%
Delegate before election
Eleanor Holmes Norton
Democratic
Elected Delegate
Eleanor Holmes Norton
Democratic

On November 8, 2016, the District of Columbia held an election for its non-voting House delegate representing the District of Columbia's at-large congressional district. The election coincided with the elections of other federal, state, and local offices.

The non-voting delegate is elected for a two-year term. Democrat Eleanor Holmes Norton, who has represented the district since 1991, was reelected to a fourteenth term in office.

== General election ==
=== Candidates ===
- Martin Moulton (Libertarian), nominee for Shadow Representative in 2014
- Eleanor Holmes Norton (Democratic), incumbent Delegate
- Natale Stracuzzi (D.C. Statehood Green), perennial candidate

=== Results ===
Washington, D.C. at-large congressional district, 2016
Party	Candidate	Votes	%	±%
Democratic	Eleanor Holmes Norton (incumbent)	265,178	88.13%	+4.40%
Libertarian	Martin Moulton	18,713	6.22%	N/A
DC Statehood Green	Natale L. Stracuzzi	14,336	4.76%	+1.23%
Write-in		2,679	0.89%	+0.24%
Total votes		'300,906'	'100.0%'	N/A
Democratic hold				

== See also ==
- United States House of Representatives elections in the District of Columbia
