= 2012 United States House of Representatives election in the District of Columbia =

- November 6, 2012
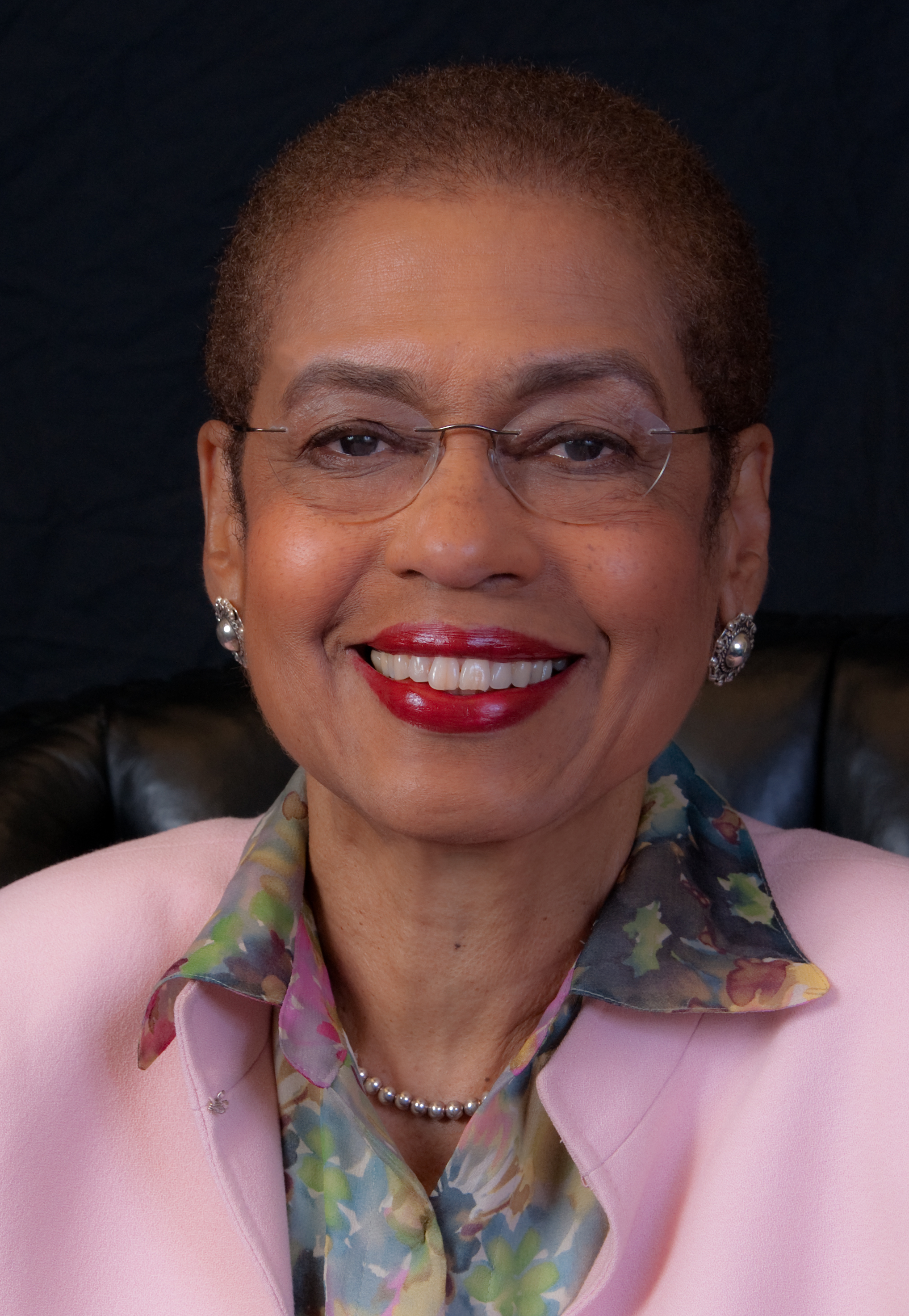

Candidate	Eleanor Holmes Norton	Bruce Majors
Party	Democratic	Libertarian
Popular vote	246,664	16,524
Percentage	88.55%	5.93%
- Norton: 60–70% 70–80% 80–90% >90% No votes
Delegate before election
Eleanor Holmes Norton
Democratic
Elected Delegate
Eleanor Holmes Norton
Democratic

On November 6, 2012, the District of Columbia held an election for its non-voting House delegate representing the District of Columbia's at-large congressional district. The election coincided with the elections of other federal offices, including a quadrennial presidential election.

The non-voting delegate is elected for two-year terms. Democrat Eleanor Holmes Norton, who has represented the district since 1991, ran for re-election. She ran unopposed in the Democratic primary, held on April 3, 2012.

== General election ==
=== Candidates ===
- Eleanor Holmes Norton (Democratic), incumbent Delegate
- Bruce Majors (Libertarian), real estate agent
- Natale Lino Stracuzzi (D.C. Statehood Green)

== Results ==
Washington, D.C. at-large congressional district, 2012
Party	Candidate	Votes	%	±%
Democratic	Eleanor Holmes Norton (incumbent)	246,664	88.55%	−0.39%
Libertarian	Bruce Majors	16,524	5.93%	N/A
DC Statehood Green	Natale "Lino" Stracuzzi	13,243	4.75%	+1.42%
Write-in		2,132	0.77%	-0.25%
Total votes		'278,563'	'100.0%'	N/A
Democratic hold				

== See also ==
- United States House of Representatives elections in the District of Columbia
