= District of Columbia Republican Party =

D.C. affiliate of the Republican Party

- Chairperson: Patrick Mara
- Founded: June 19, 1855
- Headquarters: Washington, D.C.
- Student wing: District of Columbia College Republicans
- Youth wing: District of Columbia Young Republicans
- Women's wing: League of Republican Women of DC
- Membership (2021): ▲30,146
- Ideology: Conservatism
- National affiliation: Republican Party
- Colors: Red
- District Council: 0 / 13

Election symbol

Website
- dcgop.com

The District of Columbia Republican Party (DC GOP) is the District of Columbia affiliate of the United States Republican Party. It was founded on June 19, 1855, and is made up of registered Republican voters living in Washington, D.C. elected to serve as the governing body of the Party. The party chairman is Patrick Mara and the party is housed in the District of Columbia alongside the Republican Party national headquarters.

The party faces steep difficulties in getting its candidates elected, as Democrats overwhelmingly outnumber Republicans in the District of Columbia. No Republican has ever been elected mayor since District of Columbia home rule began in 1975. The DC Republicans have had no representation in the D.C. Council since Carol Schwartz left office in 2009.

As of October 31, 2023, there are 23,343 registered voters affiliated with the Republican Party of the District of Columbia, or 5.05% of all registered voters.

== Leadership and organization ==
The District of Columbia Republican Party is chaired by Patrick Mara. The DC Republican National Committeewoman is Joanne Young and the DC Republican National Committeeman is Tim Costa.

Members of the DC GOP elect its chairman every two years. The Republican National Committeeman and Committeewoman are elected at the same time as the DC Republican presidential primary every four years, which is open to all Republican voters. The chairman appoints executive committee members with the approval of the DC GOP. Election to the DC GOP requires nomination by an existing DC GOP member and confirmation by the DC GOP Membership Recruitment Committee.

== Electoral strategy ==
According to the District of Columbia Home Rule Act (D.C. Code 1-221(d)(2)), "at no time shall there be more than three members (including the Chairman) serving at large on the Council who are affiliated with the same political party." This gives the DC Republicans their largest opportunity, and their main efforts are usually directed at this race. Rather than defeat the Democrats, a Republican candidate for an at-large seat need only defeat any independents, Libertarians, and DC Statehood Green Party candidates in the race.

=== Recent history ===
The most successful and high-profile Republican in elected office of recent years is former councilwoman Carol Schwartz (at-large). First elected in 1984, she served one term before deciding not to seek re-election in 1988. Voters returned her to the at-large seat in 1996. She was re-elected in 2000 and 2004, but lost the Republican primary election in 2008. Schwartz ran for mayor of the District of Columbia as a Republican four times (1986, 1994, 1998 and 2002), all unsuccessfully.

In 2008, Patrick Mara defeated Schwartz for the Republican nomination. Mara was backed by an endorsement from The Washington Post's editorial board and anger from the business community at Schwartz's support of a mandatory sick-leave bill. Schwartz continued to run as a write-in candidate, and both received approximately 10% of the vote. This was not enough to stop independent Michael A. Brown, formerly a Democrat, from receiving the largest vote share of the non-Democrats up for election, leaving the Council with no Republican members since 2009. The D.C. Republican Party sued the D.C. electoral board, arguing that, even though Brown officially registered as an independent in May 2008, he practically campaigned as a Democratic candidate. The District of Columbia Court of Appeals found that the D.C. electoral board and Ethics correctly considered Brown to be an independent during the election and that the Board should not investigate the day-to-day associations of a particular candidate to determine whether their party registration or lack thereof is genuine.

Allegations raised by Tim Day, former Ward 5 DC Council candidate, and Paul Craney, former executive director, helped initiate an investigation into Councilmember Harry Thomas, who defeated Day in a 2010 race. Thomas resigned in January 2012. Thomas agreed to 2 federal felony charges and was sentenced to 38 months in prison.

As of 2022, there are nine council members affiliated with the Democratic Party and two council members not affiliated with any political party.

=== Mayoral election results ===
Year	Mayoral nominee	Votes	%
1974	Jackson R. Champion	3,501	3.65%
1978	Arthur Fletcher	27,366	28.09%
1982	E. Brooke Lee Jr.	16,501	14.07%
1986	Carol Schwartz	42,354	32.84%
1990	Maurice Turner	18,653	11.47%
1994	Carol Schwartz	76,902	41.87%
1998	Carol Schwartz	42,280	30.24%
2002	Carol Schwartz	45,407	34.47%
2006	David Kranich	6,744	6.13%
2010	No candidate		
2014	No candidate (Note: Former Republicans David Catania and Carol Schwartz ran as independents and received 34.6% and 7.0%, respectively, but neither was endorsed by the DC Republican Party.)		
2018	No candidate		
2022	Stacia Hall	11,510	5.83%
2026	No candidate		
