= District of Columbia Democratic State Committee =

D.C. affiliate of the Democratic Party

- Chairperson: Chioma Iwuoha
- Headquarters: Washington, D.C.
- Membership (2021): ▲403,124
- National affiliation: Democratic Party
- Colors: Blue
- City Council: 11 / 13
- U.S. House of Representatives (Non-voting Delegate): 1 / 1

Election symbol

Website
- dcdemocraticparty.org

The District of Columbia Democratic State Committee (DC Dems) is the affiliate of the Democratic Party in the District of Columbia.

As of March 31, 2016, Democrats make up 76 percent of the registered voters in the District of Columbia, while 6 percent are registered with the Republican Party (represented by the District of Columbia Republican Committee), 1 percent with the D.C. Statehood Green Party, less than 1 percent with the Libertarian Party (represented by the Libertarian Party of the District of Columbia), and 17 percent with no party or other.

== Current elected officials ==
=== U.S. House of Representatives ===
The District of Columbia is not a U.S. state and therefore has no voting representation. Instead, constituents in the district elect a non-voting delegate to the U.S. House of Representatives. The current delegate is a Democrat.

- DC-at-large: Eleanor Holmes Norton → Robert White (elect) (Delegate to Congress)

=== City-wide executive officials ===
District of Columbia has two city-wide elected executive officials: the Mayor and the Attorney General. Both officials are Democrats.

- Mayor: Muriel Bowser → Janeese Lewis George (elect)
- Attorney General: Brian Schwalb

=== Council of the District of Columbia ===
The Council of the District of Columbia is the legislative branch of the local government of the District of Columbia. Democrats hold 11 of the 13 seats in the council.

- Council Chairman: Phil Mendelson
- At-large: Anita Bonds
- At-large: Robert White
- Ward 1: Brianne Nadeau
- Ward 2: Brooke Pinto
- Ward 3: Matthew Frumin
- Ward 4: Janeese Lewis George
- Ward 5: Kenyan McDuffie
- Ward 6: Charles Allen
- Ward 7: Wendell Felder
- Ward 8: Trayon White

=== Shadow congressperson ===
The posts of shadow United States Senator and shadow United States Representative (not to be confused with the non-voting delegate) are held by elected or appointed government officials from subnational polities of the United States that lack congressional vote. While these officials are not seated in either chamber of Congress, they seek for their subnational polity to gain voting rights in Congress.

In District of Columbia, such officeholders are elected. All of them are Democrats.

- Senior United States shadow senator: Paul Strauss (Class II)
- Junior United States shadow senator: Ankit Jain (Class I)
- Shadow representative: Oye Owolewa

== Officers ==
As of October 2026, the committee's officers are:

- Chair: Chioma Iwuoha
- Vice Chair: Aliyah McNeely
- Executive Director: Claudette David
- Recording Secretary: Trupti Patel
- Corresponding Secretary: Lïa Lake
- Treasurer: Michael Grier
- National Committeeman: Kevin B. Chavous
- National Committeewoman: Denise Reed
