= D.C. Statehood Green Party =

District of Columbia affiliate of the Green Party

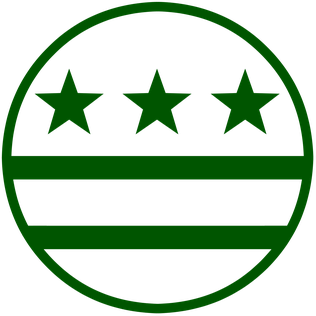
- Chairman: Darryl LC Moch
- Preceded by: DC Statehood Party
- Headquarters: Washington, D.C.
- Membership (2023): 4,140
- Ideology: Green politics D.C. statehood
- Political position: Left-wing
- National affiliation: Green Party of the United States
- Colors: Green
- D.C. Council: 0 / 13
- Advisory Neighborhood Commissions: 3 / 345

Website
- statehoodgreensofdc.org

The D.C. Statehood Green Party, known as the D.C. Statehood Party prior to 1999, is a green and progressive political party in the District of Columbia. The party is the D.C. affiliate of the Green Party of the United States and was founded in 1971 around the pursuit of District of Columbia statehood and full democratic representation for District residents. Following its 1999 merger with the D.C. Green Party, the party expanded its platform to incorporate environmental justice, economic justice, social equality, and a Green democracy while maintaining statehood as its central political objective.

The D.C. Statehood Green Party advocates for equal voting representation and local self-government for the District, alongside policies addressing affordable housing, living wages, tax equity, environmental sustainability, public education, government accountability, and community economic development. The party's stated principles emphasize inclusive participation, government transparency, responsible stewardship of public resources, and improving quality of life for District residents.

== History ==
The party emerged from the District of Columbia statehood movement and the broader struggle for greater political self-determination for District residents. It was organized in 1971 around the campaign of civil-rights and community activist Julius Hobson for the District's non-voting Congressional Delegate position. Although Hobson lost the election to Walter E. Fauntroy, his campaign received enough votes for the Statehood Party to obtain official major-party status in the District. Following the election, Hobson and his supporters organized the party as a grassroots political organization focused on expanding democratic participation and securing greater political autonomy for the District.

Among the party's early leaders and founders were Josephine Butler and architect and civil-rights activist Charles I. Cassell. Butler was a founder of the party in 1971, while Cassell worked alongside Hobson in organizing the Statehood movement. The party was organized on a ward basis, with ward chairs exercising substantial responsibility for organizing political activity within their communities. This structure reflected the party's emphasis on grassroots participation and locally organized political action.

Hobson later served on the D.C. Council, where he continued to advocate for statehood and greater control by District residents over their own government. In 1973, the Statehood Party strongly supported the District of Columbia Home Rule Act, which established a limited form of elected self-government for the District. Hobson was elected to the Council in 1974 as a Statehood Party candidate, and after his death in 1977, Hilda Mason succeeded him. From the establishment of the elected Council in 1975 through 1999, the Statehood Party maintained an at-large seat on the Council.

The party's political program extended beyond statehood to issues involving economic opportunity, housing, education, and the protection of District residents whose political representation remained limited by the District's status. By the late 1990s, the Statehood Party had become associated with a broader tradition of grassroots activism, community organizing, and advocacy for District autonomy.

In 1998, a separate Green Party organization was established in the District. Its candidate for Shadow Representative, Mike Livingston, received 9,479 votes, or 8.4 percent, exceeding the 7,500 votes then required for ballot status. In October 1999, the D.C. Green Party merged with the longstanding D.C. Statehood Party, creating the D.C. Statehood Green Party. The D.C. Green Party subsequently dissolved as part of the merger, which was approved by the D.C. Board of Elections and Ethics in November 1999.

The merger brought together the Statehood Party's longstanding emphasis on District self-determination and the Green Party's environmental and progressive political tradition. The resulting Statehood Green Party continued to advocate for D.C. statehood while expanding its political program to include issues such as economic justice, affordable housing, environmental protection, and greater community participation in government.

In a 2016 district-wide plebiscite, D.C. voters overwhelmingly approved statehood, with 86% voting in favor of making the District a state. The Statehood Green Party supported the statehood effort while also criticizing what it regarded as insufficient participation by ordinary District residents in the development of the proposed statehood process. Despite the referendum's decisive result, statehood was not enacted by Congress. A statehood bill was not passed by either chamber until the House approved H.R. 51 in 2020, and the bill subsequently stalled in the Senate. The House passed a D.C. statehood bill again in April 2021, but the Senate did not hold a vote on statehood. The absence of sufficient congressional support therefore left the District without statehood for years after D.C. voters had formally expressed their support for it.

== See also ==
- D.C. Statehood
- District of Columbia voting rights
