= Political party strength in the District of Columbia =

Politics in US district

The following table indicates the party of elected officials in the United States federal district District of Columbia.

With the enactment of the 23rd amendment to the Constitution in 1961, the district has been permitted to participate in presidential elections. It is part of the "blue wall", having voted for all Democratic nominees since 1964.

The majority of residents want the district to become a state and gain full voting representation in Congress, which was confirmed with a 2016 referendum. To prepare for this goal, the district has been electing shadow congresspeople since 1990. The shadow senators and shadow representative emulate the role of representing the district in Congress and push for statehood alongside the non-voting House delegate. All shadow congresspeople elected have been Democrats.

== Party strength, 1875–present ==
Year	Executive office		District Council		U.S. Congress				Electoral votes
Year	Mayor	Attorney General	Chair	Composition	Delegate	Shadow U.S. Senator (Seat 1)	Shadow U.S. Senator (Seat 2)	Shadow Representative	Electoral votes
1801–1870	(Note: The District of Columbia Organic Act of 1801 creates the District of Columbia; the cities of Washington, Georgetown, and Alexandria maintain their separate charters.)								(Note: First awarded electoral votes in 1964.)
1871–1874	(Note: The District of Columbia Organic Act of 1871 is enacted by Congress, creating a single, unified government of the District of Columbia.)				Norton P. Chipman (R)	no such offices			(Note: First awarded electoral votes in 1964.)
1875–1963	(Note: From 1874 to 1974, the District of Columbia was administered by a Board of Commissioners, whose members were appointed by the President.)				(Note: Congress eliminated the position in 1874 and restored it in 1971.)	no such offices			(Note: First awarded electoral votes in 1964.)
1964–1966	(Note: From 1874 to 1974, the District of Columbia was administered by a Board of Commissioners, whose members were appointed by the President.)				(Note: Congress eliminated the position in 1874 and restored it in 1971.)	no such offices			Lyndon B. Johnson/ Hubert Humphrey (D) ✓
1967	(Note: The commissioner form of government was replaced in 1967 by a mayor-commissioner and a nine-member city council appointed by the President.)				(Note: Congress eliminated the position in 1874 and restored it in 1971.)	no such offices			Lyndon B. Johnson/ Hubert Humphrey (D) ✓
1968–1970	(Note: The commissioner form of government was replaced in 1967 by a mayor-commissioner and a nine-member city council appointed by the President.)				(Note: Congress eliminated the position in 1874 and restored it in 1971.)	no such offices			Hubert Humphrey/ Edmund Muskie (D) ✗
1971	(Note: The commissioner form of government was replaced in 1967 by a mayor-commissioner and a nine-member city council appointed by the President.)				Walter Fauntroy (D)	no such offices			Hubert Humphrey/ Edmund Muskie (D) ✗
1972–1974	(Note: The commissioner form of government was replaced in 1967 by a mayor-commissioner and a nine-member city council appointed by the President.)				Walter Fauntroy (D)	no such offices			George McGovern/ Sargent Shriver (D) ✗
1975	Walter Washington (D)	(Note: Attorney general popularly elected beginning in 2014, with the first elected attorney general taking office in 2015.)	Sterling Tucker (D)	10D, 1R, 1SG	Walter Fauntroy (D)	no such offices			George McGovern/ Sargent Shriver (D) ✗
1976	Walter Washington (D)	(Note: Attorney general popularly elected beginning in 2014, with the first elected attorney general taking office in 2015.)	Sterling Tucker (D)	10D, 1R, 1SG	Walter Fauntroy (D)	no such offices			Jimmy Carter/ Walter Mondale (D) ✓
1977	Walter Washington (D)	(Note: Attorney general popularly elected beginning in 2014, with the first elected attorney general taking office in 2015.)	Sterling Tucker (D)	10D, 1R, 1SG	Walter Fauntroy (D)	no such offices			Jimmy Carter/ Walter Mondale (D) ✓
1978	Walter Washington (D)	(Note: Attorney general popularly elected beginning in 2014, with the first elected attorney general taking office in 2015.)	Sterling Tucker (D)	10D, 1R, 1SG	Walter Fauntroy (D)	no such offices			Jimmy Carter/ Walter Mondale (D) ✓
1979	Marion Barry (D)	(Note: Attorney general popularly elected beginning in 2014, with the first elected attorney general taking office in 2015.)	Arrington Dixon (D)	10D, 1R, 1SG	Walter Fauntroy (D)	no such offices			Jimmy Carter/ Walter Mondale (D) ✓
1980	Marion Barry (D)	(Note: Attorney general popularly elected beginning in 2014, with the first elected attorney general taking office in 2015.)	Arrington Dixon (D)	10D, 1R, 1SG	Walter Fauntroy (D)	no such offices			Jimmy Carter/ Walter Mondale (D) ✗
1981	Marion Barry (D)	(Note: Attorney general popularly elected beginning in 2014, with the first elected attorney general taking office in 2015.)	Arrington Dixon (D)	10D, 1R, 1SG	Walter Fauntroy (D)	no such offices			Jimmy Carter/ Walter Mondale (D) ✗
1982	Marion Barry (D)	(Note: Attorney general popularly elected beginning in 2014, with the first elected attorney general taking office in 2015.)	Arrington Dixon (D)	10D, 1R, 1SG	Walter Fauntroy (D)	no such offices			Jimmy Carter/ Walter Mondale (D) ✗
1983	Marion Barry (D)	(Note: Attorney general popularly elected beginning in 2014, with the first elected attorney general taking office in 2015.)	David A. Clarke (D)	10D, 1R, 1SG	Walter Fauntroy (D)	no such offices			Jimmy Carter/ Walter Mondale (D) ✗
1984	Marion Barry (D)	(Note: Attorney general popularly elected beginning in 2014, with the first elected attorney general taking office in 2015.)	David A. Clarke (D)	10D, 1R, 1SG	Walter Fauntroy (D)	no such offices			Walter Mondale/ Geraldine Ferraro (D) ✗
1985	Marion Barry (D)	(Note: Attorney general popularly elected beginning in 2014, with the first elected attorney general taking office in 2015.)	David A. Clarke (D)	10D, 1R, 1SG	Walter Fauntroy (D)	no such offices			Walter Mondale/ Geraldine Ferraro (D) ✗
1986	Marion Barry (D)	(Note: Attorney general popularly elected beginning in 2014, with the first elected attorney general taking office in 2015.)	David A. Clarke (D)	10D, 1R, 1SG	Walter Fauntroy (D)	no such offices			Walter Mondale/ Geraldine Ferraro (D) ✗
1987	Marion Barry (D)	(Note: Attorney general popularly elected beginning in 2014, with the first elected attorney general taking office in 2015.)	David A. Clarke (D)	10D, 1R, 1SG	Walter Fauntroy (D)	no such offices			Walter Mondale/ Geraldine Ferraro (D) ✗
1988	Marion Barry (D)	(Note: Attorney general popularly elected beginning in 2014, with the first elected attorney general taking office in 2015.)	David A. Clarke (D)	10D, 1R, 1SG	Walter Fauntroy (D)	no such offices			Michael Dukakis/ Lloyd Bentsen (D) ✗
1989	Marion Barry (D)	(Note: Attorney general popularly elected beginning in 2014, with the first elected attorney general taking office in 2015.)	David A. Clarke (D)	10D, 1I, 1SG	Walter Fauntroy (D)	no such offices			Michael Dukakis/ Lloyd Bentsen (D) ✗
1990	Marion Barry (D)	(Note: Attorney general popularly elected beginning in 2014, with the first elected attorney general taking office in 2015.)	David A. Clarke (D)	10D, 1I, 1SG	Walter Fauntroy (D)	no such offices			Michael Dukakis/ Lloyd Bentsen (D) ✗
1991	Sharon Pratt Kelly (D)	(Note: Attorney general popularly elected beginning in 2014, with the first elected attorney general taking office in 2015.)	John A. Wilson (D)	10D, 1I, 1SG	Eleanor Holmes; Norton (D)	Florence Pendleton (D)	Jesse Jackson (D)	Charles Moreland (D)	Michael Dukakis/ Lloyd Bentsen (D) ✗
1992	Sharon Pratt Kelly (D)	(Note: Attorney general popularly elected beginning in 2014, with the first elected attorney general taking office in 2015.)	John A. Wilson (D)	10D, 1I, 1SG	Eleanor Holmes; Norton (D)	Florence Pendleton (D)	Jesse Jackson (D)	Charles Moreland (D)	Bill Clinton/ Al Gore (D) ✓
1993	Sharon Pratt Kelly (D)	(Note: Attorney general popularly elected beginning in 2014, with the first elected attorney general taking office in 2015.)	David A. Clarke (D)	10D, 1I, 1SG	Eleanor Holmes; Norton (D)	Florence Pendleton (D)	Jesse Jackson (D)	Charles Moreland (D)	Bill Clinton/ Al Gore (D) ✓
1994	Sharon Pratt Kelly (D)	(Note: Attorney general popularly elected beginning in 2014, with the first elected attorney general taking office in 2015.)	David A. Clarke (D)	10D, 1I, 1SG	Eleanor Holmes; Norton (D)	Florence Pendleton (D)	Jesse Jackson (D)	Charles Moreland (D)	Bill Clinton/ Al Gore (D) ✓
1995	Marion Barry (D)	(Note: Attorney general popularly elected beginning in 2014, with the first elected attorney general taking office in 2015.)	David A. Clarke (D)	10D, 1I, 1SG	Eleanor Holmes; Norton (D)	Florence Pendleton (D)	Jesse Jackson (D)	John Capozzi (D)	Bill Clinton/ Al Gore (D) ✓
1996	Marion Barry (D)	(Note: Attorney general popularly elected beginning in 2014, with the first elected attorney general taking office in 2015.)	David A. Clarke (D)	10D, 1I, 1SG	Eleanor Holmes; Norton (D)	Florence Pendleton (D)	Jesse Jackson (D)	John Capozzi (D)	Bill Clinton/ Al Gore (D) ✓
1997	Marion Barry (D)	(Note: Attorney general popularly elected beginning in 2014, with the first elected attorney general taking office in 2015.)	David A. Clarke (D)	10D, 1R, 1SG	Eleanor Holmes; Norton (D)	Florence Pendleton (D)	Paul Strauss (D)	Sabrina Sojourner (D)	Bill Clinton/ Al Gore (D) ✓
1997	Marion Barry (D)	(Note: Attorney general popularly elected beginning in 2014, with the first elected attorney general taking office in 2015.)	Linda W. Cropp (D)	10D, 1R, 1SG	Eleanor Holmes; Norton (D)	Florence Pendleton (D)	Paul Strauss (D)	Sabrina Sojourner (D)	Bill Clinton/ Al Gore (D) ✓
1998	Marion Barry (D)	(Note: Attorney general popularly elected beginning in 2014, with the first elected attorney general taking office in 2015.)	Linda W. Cropp (D)	9D, 2R, 1SG	Eleanor Holmes; Norton (D)	Florence Pendleton (D)	Paul Strauss (D)	Sabrina Sojourner (D)	Bill Clinton/ Al Gore (D) ✓
1999	Anthony A. Williams (D)	(Note: Attorney general popularly elected beginning in 2014, with the first elected attorney general taking office in 2015.)	Linda W. Cropp (D)	10D, 2R	Eleanor Holmes; Norton (D)	Florence Pendleton (D)	Paul Strauss (D)	Tom Bryant (D)	Bill Clinton/ Al Gore (D) ✓
2000	Anthony A. Williams (D)	(Note: Attorney general popularly elected beginning in 2014, with the first elected attorney general taking office in 2015.)	Linda W. Cropp (D)	10D, 2R	Eleanor Holmes; Norton (D)	Florence Pendleton (D)	Paul Strauss (D)	Tom Bryant (D)	Al Gore/ Joe Lieberman (D) ✗
2001	Anthony A. Williams (D)	(Note: Attorney general popularly elected beginning in 2014, with the first elected attorney general taking office in 2015.)	Linda W. Cropp (D)	10D, 2R	Eleanor Holmes; Norton (D)	Florence Pendleton (D)	Paul Strauss (D)	Ray Browne (D)	Al Gore/ Joe Lieberman (D) ✗
2002	Anthony A. Williams (D)	(Note: Attorney general popularly elected beginning in 2014, with the first elected attorney general taking office in 2015.)	Linda W. Cropp (D)	10D, 2R	Eleanor Holmes; Norton (D)	Florence Pendleton (D)	Paul Strauss (D)	Ray Browne (D)	Al Gore/ Joe Lieberman (D) ✗
2003	Anthony A. Williams (D)	(Note: Attorney general popularly elected beginning in 2014, with the first elected attorney general taking office in 2015.)	Linda W. Cropp (D)	10D, 2R	Eleanor Holmes; Norton (D)	Florence Pendleton (D)	Paul Strauss (D)	Ray Browne (D)	Al Gore/ Joe Lieberman (D) ✗
2004	Anthony A. Williams (D)	(Note: Attorney general popularly elected beginning in 2014, with the first elected attorney general taking office in 2015.)	Linda W. Cropp (D)	10D, 2R	Eleanor Holmes; Norton (D)	Florence Pendleton (D)	Paul Strauss (D)	Ray Browne (D)	John Kerry/ John Edwards (D) ✗
2004	Anthony A. Williams (D)	(Note: Attorney general popularly elected beginning in 2014, with the first elected attorney general taking office in 2015.)	Linda W. Cropp (D)	10D, 1R, 1I	Eleanor Holmes; Norton (D)	Florence Pendleton (D)	Paul Strauss (D)	Ray Browne (D)	John Kerry/ John Edwards (D) ✗
2005	Anthony A. Williams (D)	(Note: Attorney general popularly elected beginning in 2014, with the first elected attorney general taking office in 2015.)	Linda W. Cropp (D)	10D, 1R, 1I	Eleanor Holmes; Norton (D)	Florence Pendleton (D)	Paul Strauss (D)	Ray Browne (D)	John Kerry/ John Edwards (D) ✗
2006	Anthony A. Williams (D)	(Note: Attorney general popularly elected beginning in 2014, with the first elected attorney general taking office in 2015.)	Linda W. Cropp (D)	10D, 1R, 1I	Eleanor Holmes; Norton (D)	Florence Pendleton (D)	Paul Strauss (D)	Ray Browne (D)	John Kerry/ John Edwards (D) ✗
2007	Adrian Fenty (D)	(Note: Attorney general popularly elected beginning in 2014, with the first elected attorney general taking office in 2015.)	Vincent C. Gray (D)	10D, 1R, 1I	Eleanor Holmes; Norton (D)	Michael Donald; Brown (D)	Paul Strauss (D)	Mike Panetta (D)	John Kerry/ John Edwards (D) ✗
2008	Adrian Fenty (D)	(Note: Attorney general popularly elected beginning in 2014, with the first elected attorney general taking office in 2015.)	Vincent C. Gray (D)	10D, 1R, 1I	Eleanor Holmes; Norton (D)	Michael Donald; Brown (D)	Paul Strauss (D)	Mike Panetta (D)	Barack Obama/ Joe Biden (D) ✓
2009	Adrian Fenty (D)	(Note: Attorney general popularly elected beginning in 2014, with the first elected attorney general taking office in 2015.)	Vincent C. Gray (D)	10D, 2I	Eleanor Holmes; Norton (D)	Michael Donald; Brown (D)	Paul Strauss (D)	Mike Panetta (D)	Barack Obama/ Joe Biden (D) ✓
2010	Adrian Fenty (D)	(Note: Attorney general popularly elected beginning in 2014, with the first elected attorney general taking office in 2015.)	Vincent C. Gray (D)	10D, 2I	Eleanor Holmes; Norton (D)	Michael Donald; Brown (D)	Paul Strauss (D)	Mike Panetta (D)	Barack Obama/ Joe Biden (D) ✓
2011	Vincent C. Gray (D)	(Note: Attorney general popularly elected beginning in 2014, with the first elected attorney general taking office in 2015.)	Kwame R. Brown (D)	10D, 2I	Eleanor Holmes; Norton (D)	Michael Donald; Brown (D)	Paul Strauss (D)	Mike Panetta (D)	Barack Obama/ Joe Biden (D) ✓
2012	Vincent C. Gray (D)	(Note: Attorney general popularly elected beginning in 2014, with the first elected attorney general taking office in 2015.)	Phil Mendelson (D) (Note: Elected interim chair by Council while holding an at-large seat; subsequently elected in special election.)	10D, 2I	Eleanor Holmes; Norton (D)	Michael Donald; Brown (D)	Paul Strauss (D)	Mike Panetta (D)	Barack Obama/ Joe Biden (D) ✓
2013	Vincent C. Gray (D)	(Note: Attorney general popularly elected beginning in 2014, with the first elected attorney general taking office in 2015.)	Phil Mendelson (D)	10D, 2I	Eleanor Holmes; Norton (D)	Michael Donald; Brown (D)	Paul Strauss (D)	Nate Bennett-Fleming (D)	Barack Obama/ Joe Biden (D) ✓
2014	Vincent C. Gray (D)	(Note: Attorney general popularly elected beginning in 2014, with the first elected attorney general taking office in 2015.)	Phil Mendelson (D)	10D, 2I	Eleanor Holmes; Norton (D)	Michael Donald; Brown (I)	Paul Strauss (D)	Nate Bennett-Fleming (D)	Barack Obama/ Joe Biden (D) ✓
2015	Muriel Bowser (D)	Karl Racine (D)	Phil Mendelson (D)	10D, 2I	Eleanor Holmes; Norton (D)	Michael Donald; Brown (I)	Paul Strauss (D)	Franklin Garcia (D)	Barack Obama/ Joe Biden (D) ✓
2016	Muriel Bowser (D)	Karl Racine (D)	Phil Mendelson (D)	10D, 2I	Eleanor Holmes; Norton (D)	Michael Donald; Brown (D)	Paul Strauss (D)	Franklin Garcia (D)	Hillary Clinton/ Tim Kaine (D) ✗
2017	Muriel Bowser (D)	Karl Racine (D)	Phil Mendelson (D)	10D, 2I	Eleanor Holmes; Norton (D)	Michael Donald; Brown (D)	Paul Strauss (D)	Franklin Garcia (D)	Hillary Clinton/ Tim Kaine (D) ✗
2018	Muriel Bowser (D)	Karl Racine (D)	Phil Mendelson (D)	10D, 2I	Eleanor Holmes; Norton (D)	Michael Donald; Brown (D)	Paul Strauss (D)	Franklin Garcia (D)	Hillary Clinton/ Tim Kaine (D) ✗
2019	Muriel Bowser (D)	Karl Racine (D)	Phil Mendelson (D)	10D, 2I	Eleanor Holmes; Norton (D)	Michael Donald; Brown (D)	Paul Strauss (D)	Franklin Garcia (D)	Hillary Clinton/ Tim Kaine (D) ✗
2020	Muriel Bowser (D)	Karl Racine (D)	Phil Mendelson (D)	10D, 2I	Eleanor Holmes; Norton (D)	Michael Donald; Brown (D)	Paul Strauss (D)	Franklin Garcia (D)	Joe Biden/ Kamala Harris (D) ✓
2021	Muriel Bowser (D)	Karl Racine (D)	Phil Mendelson (D)	10D, 2I	Eleanor Holmes; Norton (D)	Michael Donald; Brown (D)	Paul Strauss (D)	Oye Owolewa (D)	Joe Biden/ Kamala Harris (D) ✓
2022	Muriel Bowser (D)	Karl Racine (D)	Phil Mendelson (D)	10D, 2I	Eleanor Holmes; Norton (D)	Michael Donald; Brown (D)	Paul Strauss (D)	Oye Owolewa (D)	Joe Biden/ Kamala Harris (D) ✓
2023	Muriel Bowser (D)	Brian Schwalb (D)	Phil Mendelson (D)	10D, 2I	Eleanor Holmes; Norton (D)	Michael Donald; Brown (D)	Paul Strauss (D)	Oye Owolewa (D)	Joe Biden/ Kamala Harris (D) ✓
2024	Muriel Bowser (D)	Brian Schwalb (D)	Phil Mendelson (D)	10D, 2I	Eleanor Holmes; Norton (D)	Michael Donald; Brown (D)	Paul Strauss (D)	Oye Owolewa (D)	Kamala Harris/ Tim Walz (D) ✗
2025	Muriel Bowser (D)	Brian Schwalb (D)	Phil Mendelson (D)	10D, 2I	Eleanor Holmes; Norton (D)	Ankit Jain (D)	Paul Strauss (D)	Oye Owolewa (D)	Kamala Harris/ Tim Walz (D) ✗
2026	Muriel Bowser (D)	Brian Schwalb (D)	Phil Mendelson (D)	10D, 2I	Eleanor Holmes; Norton (D)	Ankit Jain (D)	Paul Strauss (D)	Oye Owolewa (D)	Kamala Harris/ Tim Walz (D) ✗
2027	Janeese Lewis George (D)	Brian Schwalb (D)	Phil Mendelson (D)	10D, 2I	Robert White (D)	Ankit Jain (D)	Paul Strauss (D)	Franklin Garcia (D)	Kamala Harris/ Tim Walz (D) ✗

Key to party colors and abbreviations for members of the U.S. Congress and other politicians or officials
Alaskan Independence (AKIP) Know Nothing (KN) American Labor (AL) Anti-Jacksonian (Anti-J); National Republican (NR) Anti-Administration (AA) Anti-Masonic (Anti-M) Conservative (Con) Covenant (Cov)	Democratic (D) Democratic–Farmer–Labor (DFL) Democratic–NPL (D-NPL) Dixiecrat (Dix), States' Rights (SR) Democratic-Republican (DR) Farmer–Labor (FL) Federalist (F); Pro-Administration (PA)	Free Soil (FS) Fusion (Fus) Greenback (GB) Independence (IPM) Jacksonian (J) Liberal (Lib) Libertarian (L) National Union (NU)	Nonpartisan League (NPL) Nullifier (N) Opposition Northern (O); Opposition Southern (O) Populist (Pop) Progressive (Prog) Prohibition (Proh) Readjuster (Rea)	Republican (R) Silver (Sv) Silver Republican (SvR) Socialist (Soc) Union (U) Unconditional Union (UU) Vermont Progressive (VP) Whig (W)	Independent (I) Nonpartisan (NP)

== See also ==
- Voting rights debate in Washington, D.C.
- Elections in the District of Columbia
