= 2006 United States Shadow Representative election in the District of Columbia =

- November 7, 2006
- Turnout: 62.5% ▼29.0 pp
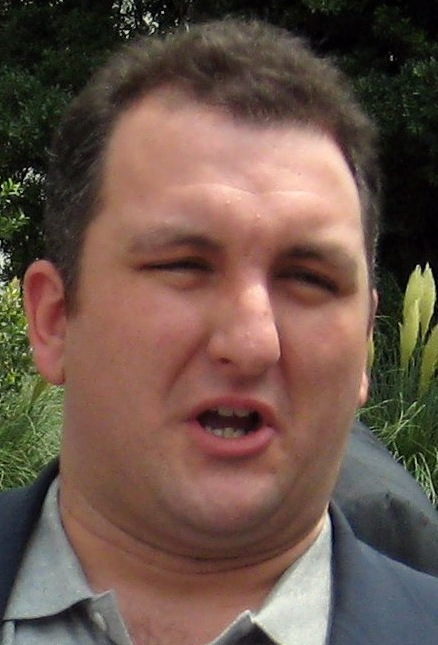

Nominee	Mike Panetta	Keith Ware	Nelson Rimensnyder
Party	Democratic	DC Statehood Green	Republican
Popular vote	82,759	13,511	9,700
Percentage	77.5%	12.7%	9.1%
- Ward results Panetta: 60–70% 70–80% 80–90%
Shadow Representative before election
Ray Browne
Democratic
Elected Shadow Representative
Mike Panetta
Democratic

On November 7, 2006, the District of Columbia held a U.S. House of Representatives election for its shadow representative. Unlike its non-voting delegate, the shadow representative is only recognized by the district and is not officially sworn or seated. Incumbent Shadow Representative Ray Browne did not run for reelection and fellow Democrat Mike Panetta was elected in his place.

== Primary elections ==
Primary elections were held on September 12, 2006. Forster withdrew from the race at the beginning of September but his name remained on the ballot and he still received thousands of votes.

=== Democratic primary ===
==== Candidates ====
- James S. Bubar, attorney and delegate for John Kerry at the Democratic National Convention
- John J. Forster (withdrew)
- Mike Panetta, Director of Public Affairs at Grassroots Enterprise

==== Results ====
Democratic primary results by ward: Panetta—50–60% Panetta—40–50% Forster—40–50%

District of Columbia Shadow Representative Democratic primary election, 2006
Party	Candidate	Votes	%
Democratic	Mike Panetta	36,373	47.00
Democratic	John J. Forster (withdrawn)	25,554	33.02
Democratic	James S. Bubar	13,493	17.43
Write-in		1,973	2.55
Total votes		77,393	100.0
n/a	Overvotes	18	
n/a	Undervotes	29,314	

=== Statehood Green primary ===
- Keith R. Ware, Nature Green owner

==== Results ====
District of Columbia Shadow Representative Statehood Green primary election, 2006
Party	Candidate	Votes	%
DC Statehood Green	Keith R. Ware	398	92.13
DC Statehood Green	Write-ins	34	7.87
Total votes		432	100.0
n/a	Overvotes	0	
n/a	Undervotes	106	

=== Other primaries ===
A Republican primary was held but no candidates filed and only write-in votes were cast. Nelson Rimensnyder ran as a Republican in the general election.

== General election ==
The general election took place on November 7, 2006.

=== Results ===
General election results
Party	Candidate	Votes	%	±%
Democratic	Mike Panetta	82,759	77.47	−8.83
DC Statehood Green	Keith R. Ware	13,511	12.65	−0.18
Republican	Nelson Rimensnyder	9,700	9.08	+9.08
Write-in		862	0.81	-0.6
Total votes		218,188	100.0%	
n/a	Overvotes	35		
n/a	Undervotes	15,471		
