= 2008 United States Shadow Representative election in the District of Columbia =

2008 election for the District of Columbia's shadow representative

- November 4, 2008
- Turnout: 62.5% ▲31.6 pp
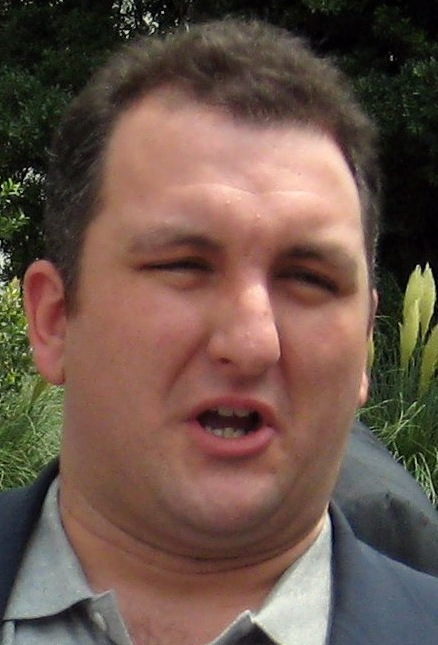

| Nominee | Mike Panetta | Joyce Robinson-Paul |
| Party | Democratic | DC Statehood Green |
| Popular vote | 187,362 | 28,703 |
| Percentage | 85.9% | 13.1% |
- Panetta: 70–80% 80–90% >90%
Shadow Representative before election
Mike Panetta
Democratic
Elected Shadow Representative
Mike Panetta
Democratic

On November 4, 2008, the District of Columbia held a U.S. House of Representatives election for its shadow representative. Unlike its non-voting delegate, the shadow representative is only recognized by the district and is not officially sworn or seated. Incumbent Shadow Representative Mike Panetta won election to a second term.

== Primary elections ==
Primary elections were held on September 9, 2008

=== Democratic primary ===
==== Candidates ====
- Mike Panetta, incumbent Shadow Representative

==== Results ====
District of Columbia Shadow Representative Democratic primary election, 2008
| Party | Candidate | Votes | % |
|---|---|---|---|
| Democratic | Mike Panetta (incumbent) | 30,223 | 98.1 |
| Democratic | Write-ins | 602 | 2.0 |
| Total votes | | 30,825 | 100.0 |
| n/a | Overvotes | 2 | |
| n/a | Undervotes | 10,582 | |

=== Statehood Green primary ===
- Joyce Robinson-Paul, perennial candidate

==== Results ====
District of Columbia Shadow Representative Statehood Green primary election, 2008
| Party | Candidate | Votes | % |
|---|---|---|---|
| DC Statehood Green | Joyce Robinson-Paul | 195 | 94.6 |
| DC Statehood Green | Write-ins | 11 | 5.4 |
| Total votes | | 206 | 100.0 |
| n/a | Overvotes | 0 | |
| n/a | Undervotes | 19 | |

=== Other primaries ===
A Republican primary was held but no candidates filed and only 248 write-in votes were cast.

== General election ==
The general election took place on November 4, 2008.

=== Results ===
General election results
| Party | Candidate | Votes | % | ±% |
|---|---|---|---|---|
| Democratic | Mike Panetta (incumbent) | 187,362 | 85.87 | +8.4 |
| DC Statehood Green | Joyce Robinson-Paul | 28,703 | 13.2 | +5.0 |
| Write-in | | 2,123 | 1.0 | |
| Total votes | | 218,188 | 100.0% | |
| n/a | Overvotes | 81 | | |
| n/a | Undervotes | 46,993 | | |
