= 2026 United States Shadow Representative election in the District of Columbia =

- November 3, 2026
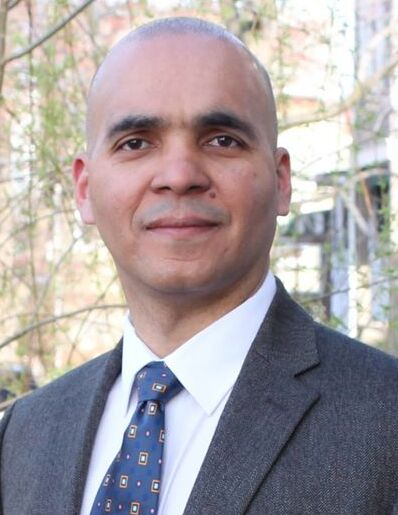

| Nominee | Franklin Garcia | Ciprian Ivanof |
| Party | Democratic | Republican |
| Popular vote | 171,529 | 10,814 |
| Percentage | 93.1% | 5.9% |
Representative before election
Oye Owolewa
Democratic
Elected Representative
Franklin Garcia
Democratic

The 2026 United States Shadow Representative election in the District of Columbia was held on November 3, 2026, to elect a shadow member to the United States House of Representatives to represent the District of Columbia. Unlike its non-voting delegate, the shadow representative is only recognized by the district and is not officially sworn or seated. The primary election will be held on June 16. Incumbent Shadow Representative Oye Owolewa is retiring.

== Democratic primary ==
=== Candidates ===
==== Nominee ====
- Franklin Garcia, former shadow representative (2015–2021) and candidate for council in 2020

==== Declined ====
- Oye Owolewa, incumbent shadow representative (running for D.C. Council)

=== Results ===
Democratic primary
| Party | Candidate | Votes | % |
|---|---|---|---|
| Democratic | Franklin Garcia | 99,964 | 97.87 |
| Write-in | | 2,178 | 2.13 |
| Total votes | | 102,142 | 100.00 |

== Republican primary ==
=== Candidates ===
==== Nominee ====
- Ciprian Ivanof, nominee in 2024

=== Results ===
Republican primary
| Party | Candidate | Votes | % |
|---|---|---|---|
| | Write-in | 676 | 100.00 |
| Total votes | | 676 | 100.00 |

== Statehood Green primary ==
=== Results ===
Statehood Green primary
| Party | Candidate | Votes | % |
|---|---|---|---|
| | Write-in | 217 | 100.00 |
| Total votes | | 217 | 100.00 |

== General election ==
=== Results ===
2026 United States Shadow Representative election in the District of Columbia
| Party | Candidate | Votes | % |
|---|---|---|---|
| Democratic | Franklin Garcia | 171,529 | 93.05 |
| Republican | Ciprian Ivanof | 10,814 | 5.87 |
| Write-in | | 1,989 | 1.08 |
| Total votes | | 184,332 | 100.00 |
