= 2004 United States Shadow Representative election in the District of Columbia =

- November 2, 2004
- Turnout: 59.9% ▲23.2 pp

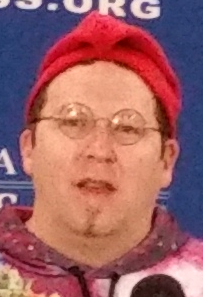
Nominee	Ray Browne	Adam Eidinger
Party	Democratic	DC Statehood Green
Popular vote	168,693	25,077
Percentage	86.3%	12.8%
Shadow Representative before election
Ray Browne
Democratic
Elected Shadow Representative
Ray Browne
Democratic

On November 2, 2004, the District of Columbia held a U.S. House of Representatives election for its shadow representative. Unlike its non-voting delegate, the shadow representative is only recognized by the district and is not officially sworn or seated. This race was a rematch of 2002 when the same two candidates appeared on the ballot. Like in 2002, incumbent Shadow Representative Ray Browne was reelected.

== Primary elections ==
Primary elections were held on September 14.

=== Democratic primary ===
==== Candidates ====
- Susana Baranano, candidate for Shadow Representative in 2002
- Ray Browne, incumbent Shadow Representative

==== Results ====
District of Columbia Shadow Representative Democratic primary election, 2004
Party	Candidate	Votes	%
Democratic	Ray Browne (incumbent)	34,970	69.70
Democratic	Susana Baranano	14,491	28.88
Write-in		710	1.42
Total votes		50,171	100.0

=== Other primaries ===
A Republican primary was held but no candidates filed and only write-in votes were cast. Adam Eidinger was the only Statehood-Green candidate and got 90% of the vote.

== General election ==
The general election took place on November 2, 2004. It was an exact rematch of the election two years before.

=== Results ===
General election results
Party	Candidate	Votes	%	±%
Democratic	Ray Browne (incumbent)	168,693	86.30	+1.59
DC Statehood Green	Adam Eidinger	25,077	12.83	−1.07
Write-in		1,706	0.87	-0.52
Total votes		195,476	100.0%	
n/a	Overvotes	91		
n/a	Undervotes	31,698		
