= 2002 United States Shadow Representative election in the District of Columbia =

- November 5, 2002
- Turnout: 36.7% ▼24.1 pp

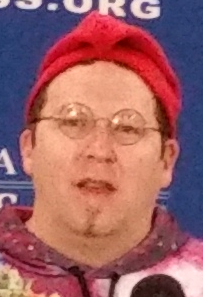
Nominee	Ray Browne	Adam Eidinger
Party	Democratic	DC Statehood Green
Popular vote	95,159	15,611
Percentage	84.7%	13.9%
Shadow Representative before election
Ray Browne
Democratic
Elected Shadow Representative
Ray Browne
Democratic

On November 5, 2002, the District of Columbia held a U.S. House of Representatives election for its shadow representative. Unlike its non-voting delegate, the shadow representative is only recognized by the district and is not officially sworn or seated. First-term incumbent Shadow Representative Ray Browne was reelected.

== Primary elections ==
Primary elections were held on September 10.

=== Democratic primary ===
==== Candidates ====
- Susana Baranano, paralegal
- Ray Browne, incumbent Shadow Representative

==== Results ====
District of Columbia Shadow Representative Democratic primary election, 2002
Party	Candidate	Votes	%
Democratic	Ray Browne (incumbent)	42,028	60.61
Democratic	Susana Baranano	24,751	35.40
Write-in		2,558	3.69
Total votes		69,337	100.0

=== Other primaries ===
A Republican primary was held but no candidates filed and only write-in votes were cast. Adam Eidinger was the only Statehood-Green candidate and received just under 90% of the vote.

== General election ==
The general election took place on November 2, 2002.

=== Results ===
General election results
Party	Candidate	Votes	%	±%
Democratic	Ray Browne (incumbent)	95,159	84.71	+10.18
DC Statehood Green	Adam Eidinger	15,611	13.90	+0.96
Write-in		1,563	1.39	+0.85
Total votes		112,333	100.0%	
