= 2008 United States Shadow Senator election in the District of Columbia =

- November 4, 2008
- Turnout: 62.5% ▲29.9pp
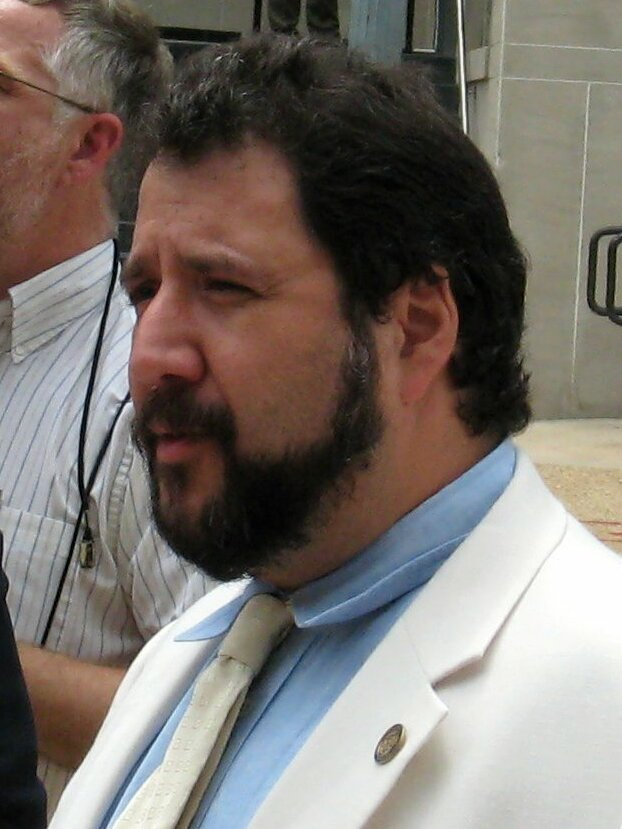

Nominee	Paul Strauss	Nelson F. Rimensnyder	Keith Ware
Party	Democratic	Republican	DC Statehood Green
Popular vote	183,519	18,601	16,881
Percentage	80.82%	8.19%	7.43%
- Precinct results Strauss: 50–60% 60–70% 70–80% 80–90% >90%
Shadow Senator before election
Paul Strauss
Democratic
Elected Shadow Senator
Paul Strauss
Democratic

The 2008 United States Shadow Senator election in the District of Columbia took place on November 4, 2008, to elect a shadow member to the United States Senate to represent the District of Columbia. The member was only recognized by the District of Columbia and not officially sworn or seated by the United States Senate.

Incumbent Shadow Senator Paul Strauss won reelection to a third term.

== Primary elections ==
Party primaries took place on September 9, 2008.

=== Democratic primary ===
==== Candidates ====
- Paul Strauss, incumbent shadow senator
- Philip Pannell

==== Results ====
Democratic primary results
Party	Candidate	Votes	%
Democratic	Paul Strauss	22,811	64.82%
Democratic	Philip Pannell	11,949	33.96%
Write-in		430	1.22%
Total votes		35,190	100.00%

== General election ==
Strauss faced Republican Nelson Rimensnyder, D.C. Statehood Green candidate Keith R. Ware and Libertarian candidate Damien Lincoln Ober. As is usual for Democrats in the District, Strauss won in a landslide.

=== Candidates ===
- Paul Strauss (Democratic)
- Nelson Rimensnyder (Republican)
- Keith R. Ware (D.C. Statehood Green)
- Damien Lincoln Ober (Libertarian)

=== Results ===
General election results
Party	Candidate	Votes	%
Democratic	Paul Strauss (incumbent)	183,519	80.82%
Republican	Nelson F. Rimensnyder	18,601	8.19%
DC Statehood Green	Keith Ware	16,881	7.43%
Libertarian	Damien Lincoln Ober	5,915	2.60%
Write-in		2,164	0.95%
Total votes		227,080	100.00%
Democratic hold			
