= 1996 United States Shadow Representative election in the District of Columbia =

- November 15, 1996
- Turnout: 52.4% pp
Nominee	Sabrina Sojourner	Gloria R. Corn
Party	Democratic	Republican
Popular vote	111,413	20,240
Percentage	83.4%	15.2%
Shadow Representative before election
John Capozzi
Democratic
Elected Shadow Representative
Sabrina Sojourner
Democratic

On November 15, 1996, the District of Columbia held a U.S. House of Representatives election for its shadow representative. Unlike its non-voting delegate, the shadow representative is only recognized by the district and is not officially sworn or seated. One-term incumbent John Capozzi declined to run for reelection and was succeeded by fellow Democrat Sabrina Sojourner.

== Primary elections ==
Primary elections were held on September 10.

=== Democratic primary ===
==== Candidates ====
- Sabrina Sojourner, management consultant

===== Declined to run =====
- John Capozzi, incumbent Shadow Representative (Ran for City Council at-large)

==== Results ====
District of Columbia Shadow Representative Democratic primary election, 1996
Party	Candidate	Votes	%
Democratic	Sabrina Sojourner	28,113	94.42
Write-in		1,660	5.58
Total votes		29,773	100.00

=== Other primaries ===
Primaries were held for the Republican, Statehood, and Umoja parties but no candidates were on the ballot and only write-in votes were cast.

== Other candidates ==
=== Republican ===
- Gloria Corn, writer and candidate for Shadow Representative in 1992

== General election ==
The general election took place on November 15.

=== Results ===
General election results
Party	Candidate	Votes	%	±%
Democratic	Sabrina Sojourner	111,413	83.37	+14.72
Republican	Gloria R. Corn	20,240	15.15	+2.83
Write-in		1,984	1.48	+0.40
Total votes		133,637	100.00	
