= 1996 United States Shadow Senator election in the District of Columbia =

- November 15, 1996
- Turnout: 39.0%
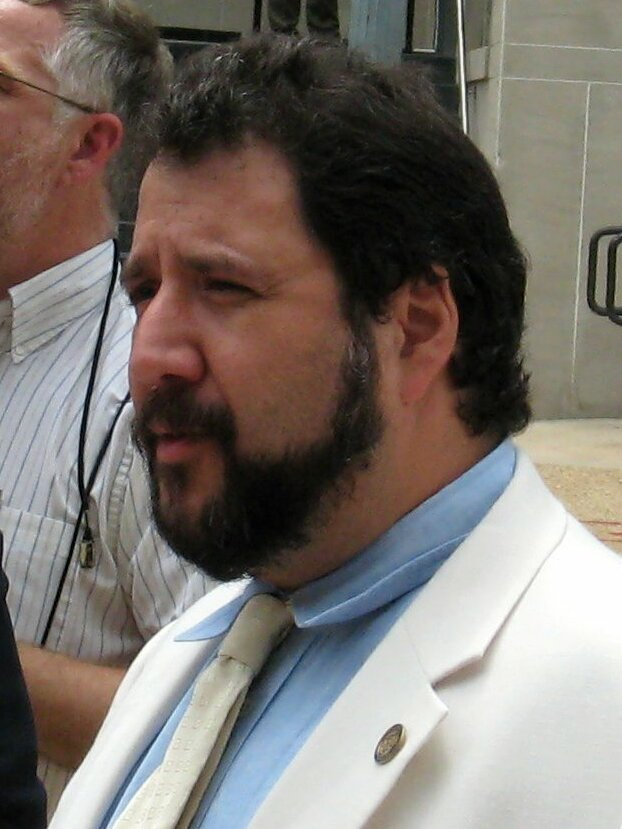

Nominee	Paul Strauss	Gloria R. Corn	George Pope
Party	Democratic	Republican	Umoja
Popular vote	107,217	19,044	13,148
Percentage	76.01%	13.50%	9.32%
Shadow Senator before election
Jesse Jackson
Democratic
Elected Shadow Senator
Paul Strauss
Democratic

The 1996 United States Shadow Senator election in the District of Columbia took place on November 15, 1996, to elect a shadow member to the United States Senate to represent the District of Columbia. The member was only recognized by the District of Columbia and not officially sworn or seated by the United States Senate. Incumbent Shadow Senator Jesse Jackson decided not to run for reelection. Local ANC Commissioner and lawyer Paul Strauss easily won the primary against little-known Eduardo Burkhart and also won the general election.

== Primary elections ==
Party primaries took place on September 10, 1996.

=== Democratic primary ===
==== Candidates ====
- Paul Strauss, lawyer and ANC Commissioner
- Eduardo Burkhart

==== Declined ====
- Jesse Jackson, incumbent Shadow Senator

==== Results ====
Democratic primary results
Party	Candidate	Votes	%
Democratic	Paul Strauss	23,265	73.45%
Democratic	Eduardo Burkhart	7,194	22.71%
Write-in		1,216	3.84%
Total votes		31,675	100.00%

== General election ==
Strauss faced Republican Gloria R. Corn, and Umoja candidate George Pope. As is usual for Democrats in the District, Strauss won in a landslide.

=== Candidates ===
- Paul Strauss (Democratic)
- Gloria R. Corn (Republican)
- George Pope (Umoja)

=== Results ===
General election results
Party	Candidate	Votes	%
Democratic	Paul Strauss	107,217	76.01%
Republican	Gloria R. Corn	19,044	13.50%
Umoja	George Pope	13,148	9.32%
Write-in		1,511	0.95%
Total votes		141,062	100.00%
Democratic hold			
