= 1998 United States Shadow Representative election in the District of Columbia =

- November 13, 1998
- Turnout: 40.2% pp
Nominee	Tom Bryant	David VanWilliams	Mike Livingston
Party	Democratic	DC Statehood	Green
Popular vote	86,546	14,637	9,479
Percentage	76.8%	13.0%	8.4%
Shadow Representative before election
Sabrina Sojourner
Democratic
Elected Shadow Representative
Tom Bryant
Democratic

On November 13, 1998, the District of Columbia held a U.S. House of Representatives election for its shadow representative. Unlike its non-voting delegate, the shadow representative is only recognized by the district and is not officially sworn or seated. One-term incumbent Sabrina Sojourner declined to run for reelection and was succeeded by fellow Democrat Tom Bryant.

== Primary elections ==
Primary elections were held on September 15.

=== Democratic primary ===
==== Candidates ====
- Tom Bryant, non-profit fundraiser and consultant
- Eduardo Burkhart, Chairman of the New Columbia Liberation Organization

==== Results ====
District of Columbia Shadow Representative Democratic primary election, 1998
Party	Candidate	Votes	%
Democratic	Tom Bryant, Jr. (incumbent)	45,492	73.29
Democratic	Eduardo Burkhart	14,590	23.51
Write-in		1,987	3.20
Total votes		62,069	100.00

=== DC Statehood Party ===
==== Candidate ====
- David VanWilliams, carpenter and US Army veteran

==== Results ====
District of Columbia Shadow Representative DC Statehood primary election, 1998
Party	Candidate	Votes	%
DC Statehood	David VanWilliams	291	84.84
Write-in		52	15.16
Total votes		343	100.00

=== Other primaries ===
Primaries were held for the Republican, and Umoja parties but no candidates were on the ballot and only write-in votes were cast.

=== Other candidates ===
==== Green ====
Social justice activist and writer Mike Livingston was nominated by the DC Green Party. The DC Green Party had only been founded earlier that year and Livingston was among the first Green candidates to appear on the ballot.

== General election ==
The general election took place on November 13. This was the first election contested by the Green Party, which had been founded earlier that year. Livingston exceeded the 7,500 vote threshold needed to achieve ballot access for the Greens in future elections.

=== Results ===
General election results
Party	Candidate	Votes	%	±%
Democratic	Tom Bryant Jr.	86,546	76.75	−6.62
DC Statehood	David VanWilliams	14,637	12.98	+12.98
Green	Mike Livingston	9,479	8.41	+8.41
Write-in		2,108	1.87	-0.39
Total votes		112,770	100.00	
