= 2014 United States Shadow Representative election in the District of Columbia =

- November 4, 2014
- Turnout: 38.5% ▼22.5 pp
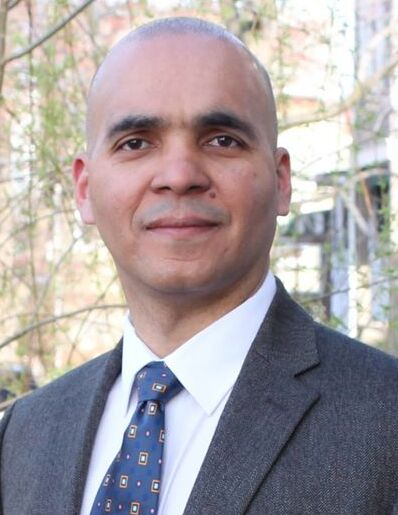

Nominee	Franklin Garcia	Joyce Robinson-Paul	Martin Moulton
Party	Democratic	DC Statehood Green	Libertarian
Popular vote	114,073	19,982	11,002
Percentage	77.6%	13.6%	7.5%
- Garcia: 60–70% 70–80% 80–90% >90% No votes
Representative before election
Nate Bennett-Fleming
Democratic
Elected Representative
Franklin Garcia
Democratic

On November 4, 2014, the District of Columbia held a U.S. House of Representatives election for its shadow representative. Unlike its non-voting delegate, the shadow representative is only recognized by the district and is not officially sworn or seated. Incumbent Shadow Representative Nate Bennett-Fleming did not run for reelection and Franklin Garcia was elected in his place. The election was held concurrently with a mayoral election.

== Primary elections ==
Primary elections were held on April 1, 2014.

=== Democratic primary ===
==== Candidates ====
- Franklin Garcia, community activist

==== Results ====
District of Columbia Shadow Representative Democratic primary election, 2014
Party	Candidate	Votes	%
Democratic	Franklin Garcia	57,946	97.4
Democratic	Write-ins	2,183	3.6
Total votes		60,129	100.0

=== Libertarian primary ===
==== Candidates ====
- Martin Moulton, school choice activist

==== Results ====
District of Columbia Shadow Representative Democratic primary election, 2014
Party	Candidate	Votes	%
Libertarian	Martin Moulton	30	100.0
Total votes		60,129	100.0

=== Other primaries ===
The Republican and Statehood Green parties held primaries, but no candidates declared and the contests saw only write-in votes.

== General election ==
The general election took place on November 8, 2016. Garcia was the only candidate on the ballot and won reelection to a second term.

=== Results ===
General election results
Party	Candidate	Votes	%	±%
Democratic	Franklin Garcia	114,073	77.6	−10.4
DC Statehood Green	Joyce Robinson-Paul	19,982	13.6	+0.7
Libertarian	Martin Moulton	11,002	7.5	+7.5
Write-in		1,931	1.3	
Total votes		146,988	100.0%	
n/a	Overvotes	64		
n/a	Undervotes	30,306		
