= 2016 United States Shadow Representative election in the District of Columbia =

- November 8, 2016
- Turnout: 65.3% ▲26.9 pp
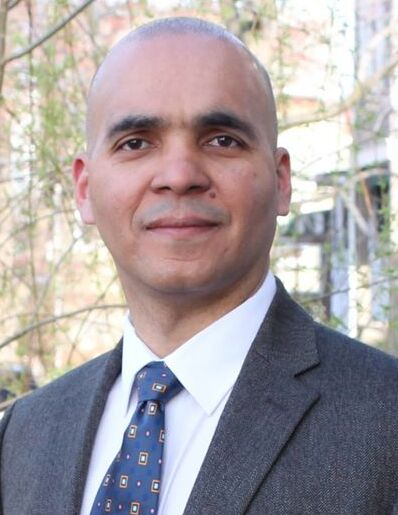
Nominee	Franklin Garcia
Party	Democratic
Popular vote	252,992
Percentage	97.3%
- Garcia: >90%
Representative before election
Franklin Garcia
Democratic
Elected Representative
Franklin Garcia
Democratic

On November 8, 2016, the District of Columbia held a U.S. House of Representatives election for its shadow representative. Unlike its non-voting delegate, the shadow representative is only recognized by the district and is not officially sworn or seated. Incumbent Shadow Representative Franklin Garcia won reelection unopposed.

== Primary elections ==
Primary elections were held on June 14, 2016, concurrent with the presidential primary.

=== Democratic primary ===
==== Candidates ====
- Franklin Garcia, incumbent Shadow Representative (since 2015)

==== Results ====
District of Columbia Shadow Representative Democratic primary election, 2018
Party	Candidate	Votes	%
Democratic	Franklin Garcia (incumbent)	75,186	96.4
Democratic	Write-ins	2,800	3.6
Total votes		77,986	100.0
n/a	Overvotes	11	
n/a	Undervotes	20,291	

=== Other primaries ===
The Republican and D.C. Statehood Green parties held primaries, but no candidates declared and the contests saw only write-in votes.

== General election ==
The general election took place on November 8, 2016. Garcia was the only candidate on the ballot and won reelection to a second term.

=== Results ===
General election results
Party	Candidate	Votes	%	±%
Democratic	Franklin Garcia (incumbent)	252,992	96.9	+19.7
Write-in		6,396	3.1	
Total votes		259,928	100.0%	
n/a	Overvotes	73		
n/a	Undervotes	51,066		
