= Nate Fleming =

American politician

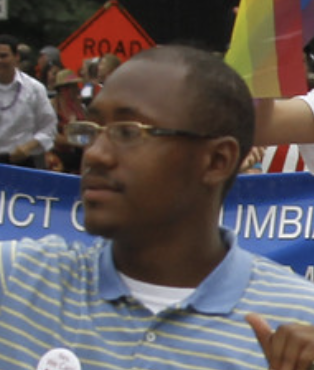

Shadow Member of the U.S. House of Representatives from the District of Columbia's at-large district
- In office January 3, 2013 – January 3, 2015
- Preceded by: Mike Panetta
- Succeeded by: Franklin Garcia

Personal details
- Born: Nathan Bennett Fleming; 1984 or 1985 (age 41–42) Washington, D. C., U.S.
- Party: Democratic
- Education: Morehouse College (BA); University of California, Berkeley (JD); Harvard University (MPP); University of Pennsylvania (EdD)

Nathan Bennett Fleming (born 1984/1985) is an American politician, attorney, and member of the Democratic Party. In November 2012, he was elected as the shadow representative of the United States House of Representatives from the District of Columbia.

== Early life and education ==
Fleming was born in Washington, DC and raised in a low-income housing development along Minnesota Avenue in Northeast by a single mom. He attended St. Andrews Episcopal School in Potomac, Maryland and later received a bachelor's in political science from Morehouse College in 2007 and a J.D. degree from the University of California, Berkeley in 2011. He additionally attended Harvard University from 2008 to 2009 (studying simultaneously with his JD), but initially dropped out prior to completing his Master of Public Policy to focus on law school and his 2010 campaign for shadow representative. He later completed his MPP from Harvard in 2022 and a Doctor of Education from the University of Pennsylvania in higher education administration in 2025.

== Career ==
Fleming worked as counsel to a software development firm and as a lobbyist. He then joined the office of Ward 8 councilmember Trayon White as legislative director. He later served as committee director for the council's panel on recreation and youth affairs.

== Politics ==
Fleming first ran for shadow representative in 2010 while he was still a law student. He challenged Mike Panetta, the two-term incumbent and veteran political strategist. While Fleming lost to Panetta by roughly 14 percentage points, the former ran again for the seat in 2012 and won the primary unopposed.

=== Shadow Representative (2013-2015) ===
Fleming served one term as Washington's shadow representative, the unpaid, non-congressionally recognized position that advocates for DC statehood. The Washington City Paper's Will Sommer noted that while Fleming "doesn't bring the same baggage" as his colleagues shadow Senators Paul Strauss and Michael Donald Brown, he, like many of his predecessors, failed to usher in statehood for Washington. Regardless, Fleming appeared regularly at protests and meetings, continuing his lobbying for a potential 51st state.

=== Campaigns for D.C. Council ===
Fleming passed on reelection to the shadow representative role in order to run for the at-large seat on the Council of the District of Columbia in 2014. Challenging incumbent Anita Bonds, he positioned himself as a younger face with "little patience for the old ways of city politics." In the April primary, Fleming placed second out of five, trailing Bonds by 30 points.

In 2015, Fleming announced a bid to replace the late, legendary Marion Barry on the council. Barry had died in 2014 while representing Ward 8. Fleming did not appear on the ballot.

In 2022, Fleming challenged Bonds again in the Democratic primary for one of the city's at-large council seats. During the campaign trail, Fleming was carjacked in the Deanwood neighborhood of Washington. When asked by WTOP-FM about his plan to solve the city's growing carjacking epidemic, he noted that young people were not being "provided with economic opportunities." He vowed to bring back "high-quality after-school programs that [brings] caring adults into [students'] lives," noting he was involved with similar programs when he was younger.

Although Fleming was endorsed by the Washington Post's editorial board, he once again came up short. Fleming placed third in the June primary behind former United States Department of Housing and Urban Development investigator Lisa Gore and incumbent Anita Bonds.

In 2024, Fleming, undeterred, charted yet another run for the council. In the election for the Ward 7 seat, Fleming aimed to succeed the retiring Vincent Gray. Fleming, however, failed to garner the similar kind of traction of his previous campaigns, falling notably flat in the June primary. He garnered 1,069 votes—roughly 8.7% of the vote—and sat in sixth place throughout the night.

Fleming is currently a candidate in the 2026 DC council election. He's running for the open, Democratic at-large seat that is being vacated by Anita Bonds.

== Personal life ==
Fleming lives in Washington's Deanwood neighborhood. He is an assistant law professor at Wake Forest University School of Law, specializing in local government, democracy, and justice-related issues involving race, politics, and higher education.

U.S. House of Representatives
Preceded by Mike Panetta	Shadow Member of the U.S. House of Representatives from the District of Columbia's at-large congressional district 2013–2015	Succeeded by Franklin Garcia
