= 2024 United States Shadow Senator election in the District of Columbia =

- November 5, 2024
Nominee	Ankit Jain	Nelson Rimensnyder
Party	Democratic	Republican
Popular vote	265,360	26,968
Percentage	89.94%	9.14%
- Jain: 60–70% 70–80% 80–90% >90%
Shadow Senator before election
Michael D. Brown
Democratic
Elected Shadow Senator
Ankit Jain
Democratic

The 2024 United States Shadow Senator election in the District of Columbia took place on November 5, 2024, to elect a shadow member to the United States Senate to represent the District of Columbia. The member is only recognized by the District of Columbia and not officially sworn or seated by the U.S. Senate. Democratic candidate Ankit Jain defeated Republican candidate Nelson Rimensnyder to succeed Democrat Mike Brown in the position.

== Democratic primary ==
The Democratic primary took place on Tuesday, June 4, 2024. Incumbent Mike Brown was stirred in controversy prior to the election in response to him calling claiming that the city council acts like a "petulant child" and that its councilors act like "drunk, irresponsible teenagers" in response to Congress striking down a controversial legislative package the council passed. After Brown made these comments, several candidates declared they would challenge him in the Democratic primary. Brown, in an interview with the Washington City Paper, suggested that he might retire rather than seek re-election in 2024. Brown announced on January 12, 2024, that he would not seek another term. The City Paper also suggested that Kinlow represented the city's "old guard" and that Jain was more of an outsider.

=== Candidates ===
==== Nominee ====
- Ankit Jain, former Sierra Club attorney

==== Eliminated in primary ====
- Eugene Kinlow, federal affairs lobbyist

==== Not on ballot ====
- Wendy Hamilton, ANC Commissioner
- Franklin Garcia, former US Shadow Representative
- Andrew C. Haynesworth

==== Declined ====
- Mike Brown, incumbent Shadow Senator

=== Results ===

Jain

60–70%
70–80%

Kinlow

50–60%
60–70%

Jain

40–50%
50–60%
60–70%
70–80%
80–90%

Kinlow

40–50%
50–60%
60–70%
70–80%
80–90%

Democratic primary results
Party	Candidate	Votes	%
Democratic	Ankit Jain	41,664	53.09
Democratic	Eugene D. Kinlow	35,108	44.74
Democratic	Write-in	1,694	0.89
Total votes		78,466	100.00

== D.C. Statehood Green primary ==
The D.C. Statehood Green Party held a primary, but no candidate filed prior to the ballot order being confirmed.

=== Results ===
D.C. Statehood Green primary
Party	Candidate	Votes	%
DC Statehood Green	Write-ins	216	100.0
Total votes		216	100.00

== Republican primary ==
=== Nominee ===
- Nelson Rimensnyder

=== Results ===
Republican primary
Party	Candidate	Votes	%
Republican	Write-ins	584	100.0
Total votes		584	100.00

== General election ==
2024 United States Shadow Senator election in the District of Columbia
Party	Candidate	Votes	%
Democratic	Ankit Jain	265,360	89.94%
Republican	Nelson Rimensnyder	26,968	9.14%
Write-in		2,705	0.92%
Total votes		295,033	100.00%
Democratic hold			

=== Results by ward ===
Ward	Ankit Jain Democratic		Nelson Rimensynder Republican		Various candidates Other parties	
Ward	#	%	#	%	#	%
Ward 1	34,108	92.28%	2,517	6.81%	336	0.91%
Ward 2	29,284	87.08%	4,021	11.96%	324	0.96%
Ward 3	33,240	85.94%	5,073	13.12%	367	0.95%
Ward 4	34,843	91.44%	2,890	7.58%	732	0.98%
Ward 5	38.709	92.51%	2,799	6.69%	333	0.8%
Ward 6	38,756	87.08%	5,262	11.82%	487	1.09%
Ward 7	31,698	92.68%	2,233	6.53%	270	0.79%
Ward 8	24,722	91.19%	2,173	8.02%	216	0.8%
Total	265,360	89.94%	26,968	9.14%	2,705	0.92%
