= 2002 United States Shadow Senator election in the District of Columbia =

- November 5, 2002
- Turnout: 32.6% ▼6.4pp
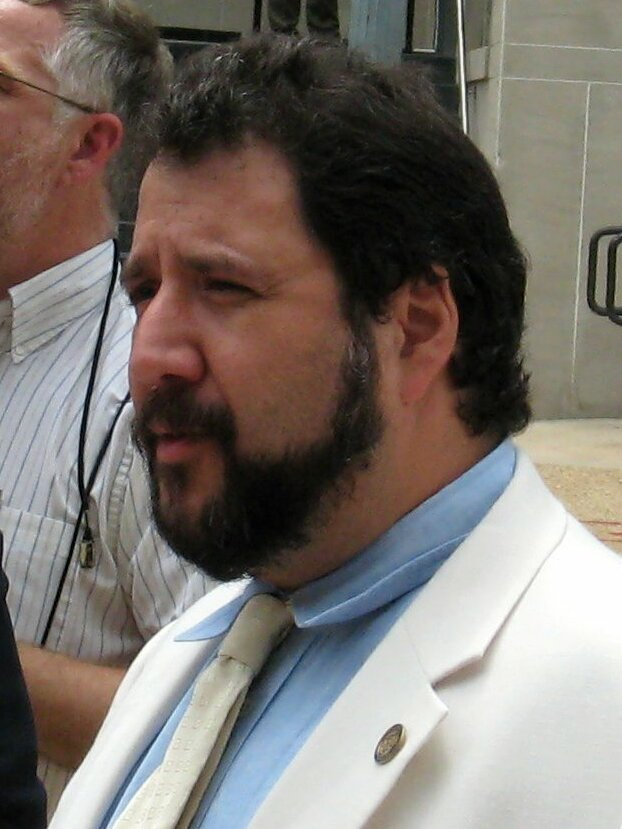

Nominee	Paul Strauss	Joyce Robinson-Paul	Norma M. Sasaki
Party	Democratic	DC Statehood Green	Republican
Popular vote	91,434	13,966	11,277
Percentage	77.32%	11.81%	9.54%
Shadow Senator before election
Paul Strauss
Democratic
Elected Shadow Senator
Paul Strauss
Democratic

The 2002 United States Shadow Senator election in the District of Columbia took place on November 5, 2002, to elect a shadow member to the United States Senate to represent the District of Columbia. The member was only recognized by the District of Columbia and was not officially sworn or seated by the United States Senate. Incumbent Shadow Senator Paul Strauss decisively won the primary against challenger Pete Ross and was reelected to a second term by a landslide.

== Primary elections ==
Party primaries took place on September 10, 2002.

=== Democratic primary ===
==== Candidates ====
- Paul Strauss, incumbent shadow senator
- Pete Ross, businessman, landlord, former Army captain

==== Results ====
Democratic primary results
Party	Candidate	Votes	%
Democratic	Paul Strauss	47,787	65.87%
Democratic	Pete Ross	22,633	31.20%
Write-in		2,128	2.93%
Total votes		72,548	100.00%

=== Republican primary ===
==== Candidates ====
- Norma M. Sasaki
- Clark D. Horvath

Democratic primary results
Party	Candidate	Votes	%
Republican	Norma M. Sasaki (write-in)	34	5.61%
Republican	Clark D. Horvath (write-in)	2	0.33%
Write-in		570	94.06%
Total votes		606	100.00%

== General election ==
Strauss faced Republican Norma M. Sasaki, and D.C. Statehood Green candidate Joyce Robinson-Paul. As is usual for Democrats in the District, Strauss won in a landslide.

=== Candidates ===
- Paul Strauss (Democratic)
- Norma M. Sasaki (Republican)
- Joyce Robinson-Paul (D.C. Statehood Green)

=== Results ===
General election results
Party	Candidate	Votes	%
Democratic	Paul Strauss (incumbent)	91,434	77.32%
DC Statehood Green	Joyce Robinson-Paul	13,966	11.81%
Republican	Norma M. Sasaki	11,277	9.54%
Write-in		1,582	1.34%
Total votes		118,259	100.00%
Democratic hold			
