= 2000 United States Shadow Representative election in the District of Columbia =

- November 7, 2000
- Turnout: 58.1% ▼17.9 pp
Nominee	Ray Browne	Martin Thomas	John Shumake
Party	Democratic	DC Statehood Green	Republican
Popular vote	120,700	20,960	15,382
Percentage	74.5%	12.9%	9.5%
Shadow Representative before election
Tom Bryant
Democratic
Elected Shadow Representative
Ray Browne
Democratic

On November 7, 2000, the District of Columbia held a U.S. House of Representatives election for its shadow representative. Unlike its non-voting delegate, the shadow representative is only recognized by the district and is not officially sworn or seated. One-term incumbent Tom Bryant declined to run for reelection and was succeeded by fellow Democrat Ray Browne.

== Primary elections ==
Primary elections were held on September 12. Browne, Thomas, and Olusegun faced no opposition while Shumake did not appear on the primary ballot.

== General election ==
The general election took place on November 7, 2000.

=== Results ===
General election results
Party	Candidate	Votes	%	±%
Democratic	Ray Browne	120,700	74.53	−2.22
DC Statehood Green	Martin Thomas	20,960	12.94	N/A
Republican	John Shumake	15,382	9.50	+9.50
Umoja	Kalonji T. Olusegun	4,032	2.49	+2.49
Write-in		878	0.54	-1.33
Total votes		161,952	100.0%	
