= Eidinger =

Eidinger is a surname. Notable people with the surname include:

- Adam Eidinger (born 1973), American businessman and cannabis activist
- Lars Eidinger (born 1976), German actor
