= 2010 United States Shadow Representative election in the District of Columbia =

- November 2, 2010
- Turnout: 30.0% ▼32.5 pp
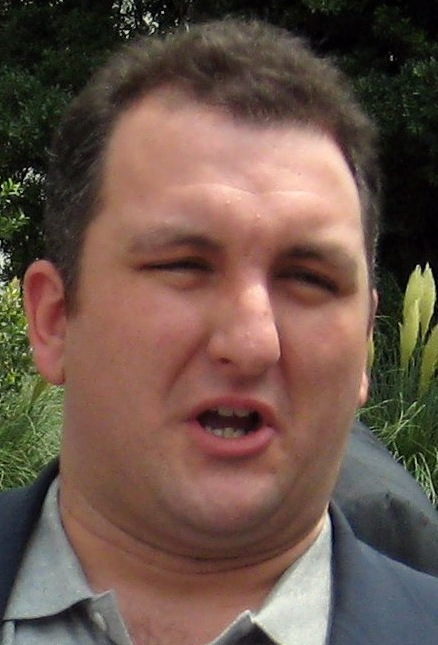

Nominee	Mike Panetta	Nelson Rimensnyder	Joyce Robinson-Paul
Party	Democratic	Republican	DC Statehood Green
Popular vote	101,207	11,094	9,489
Percentage	82.4%	9.0%	7.7%
- Panetta: 50–60% 60–70% 70–80% 80–90% >90%
Shadow Representative before election
Mike Panetta
Democratic
Elected Shadow Representative
Mike Panetta
Democratic

On November 2, 2010, the District of Columbia held a U.S. House of Representatives election for its shadow representative. Unlike its non-voting delegate, the shadow representative is only recognized by the district and is not officially sworn or seated. Incumbent Shadow Representative Mike Panetta won election to a third term.

== Primary elections ==
Primary elections were held on September 14, 2010.

=== Democratic primary ===
==== Candidates ====
- Mike Panetta, incumbent Shadow Representative
- Nate Bennett-Fleming, law student

==== Results ====
Results by ward: Bennett-Fleming—40–50% Bennett-Fleming—50–60% Panetta—50–60% Panetta—60–70% Panetta—70–80%

District of Columbia Shadow Representative Democratic primary election, 2010
Party	Candidate	Votes	%
Democratic	Mike Panetta (incumbent)	57,666	55.8
Democratic	Nate Bennett-Fleming	43,243	41.9
Democratic	Write-ins	2,427	2.4
Total votes		103,336	100.0

=== Republican primary ===
==== Candidates ====
- Nelson Rimensnyder

==== Results ====
District of Columbia Shadow Representative Republican primary election, 2010
Party	Candidate	Votes	%
Republican	Nelson Rimensnyder	1,953	92.7
Republican	Write-ins	153	7.3
Total votes		2,106	100.0

=== Statehood Green primary ===
==== Candidates ====
- Joyce Robinson-Paul

==== Results ====
District of Columbia Shadow Representative Statehood Green primary election, 2010
Party	Candidate	Votes	%
DC Statehood Green	Joyce Robinson-Paul	450	88.6%
DC Statehood Green	Write-ins	58	11.4%
Total votes		508	100.0%

== General election ==
The general election took place on November 3, 2010.

=== Results ===
General election results
Party	Candidate	Votes	%	±%
Democratic	Mike Panetta (incumbent)	101,207	82.4	−3.5
Republican	Nelson Rimensnyder	11,094	9.0	+9.0
DC Statehood Green	Joyce Robinson-Paul	9,489	7.7	−5.4
Write-in		1,103	0.9	
Total votes		122,893	100.0%	
