= 2026 United States Shadow Senator election in the District of Columbia =

- November 3, 2026
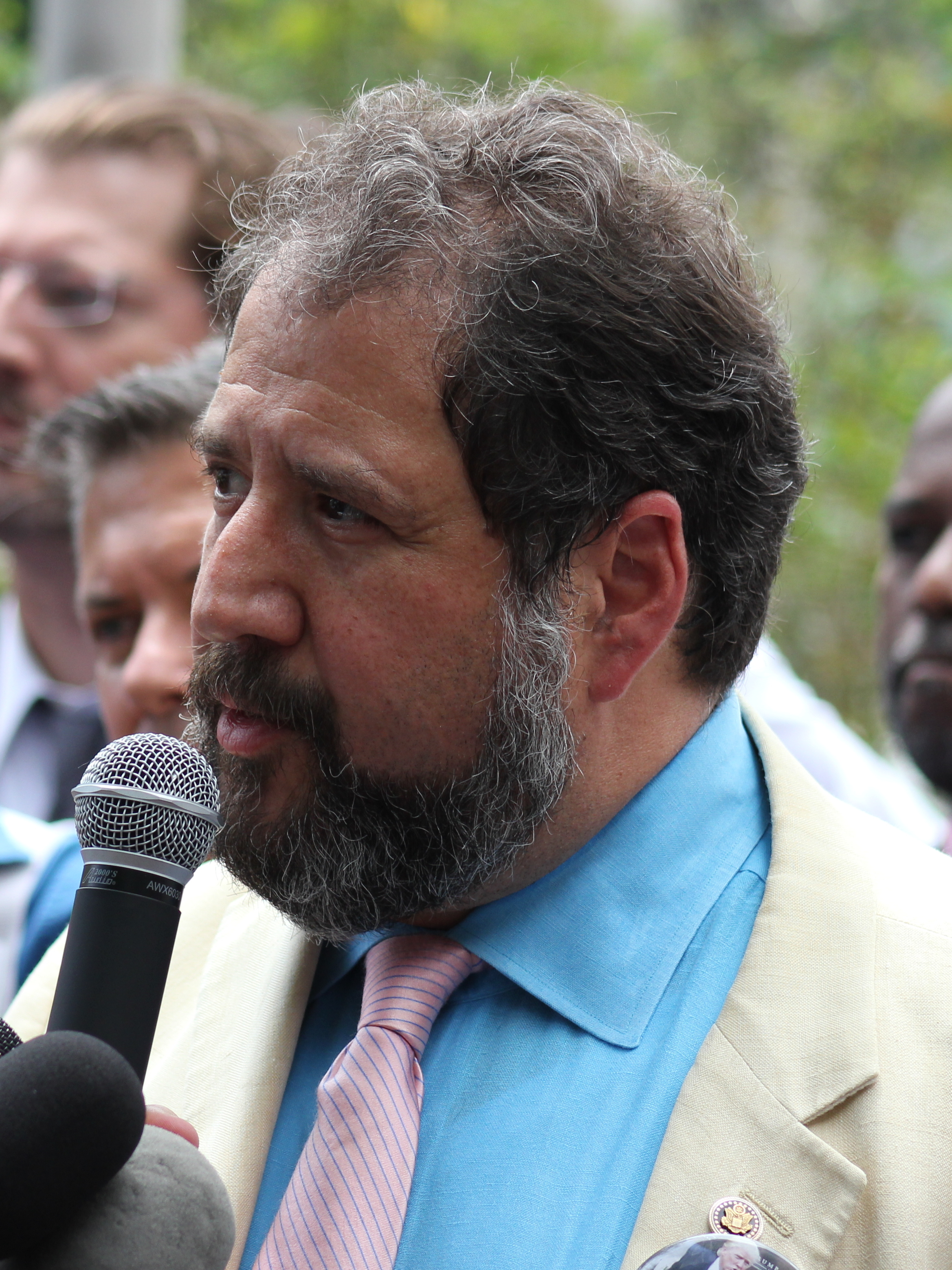

Candidate	Paul Strauss	Robert Simmons
Party	Democratic	Republican
Popular vote	171,550	12,470
Percentage	92.1%	6.7%
Senator before election
Paul Strauss
Democratic
Elected Senator
Paul Strauss
Democratic

The 2026 United States Shadow Senator election in the District of Columbia was held on November 3, 2026, to elect a shadow member to the United States Senate to represent the District of Columbia. The shadow senator is only recognized by the district and is not officially sworn or seated. Primary elections were held on June 16. Incumbent Shadow Senator Paul Strauss is running for re-election.

== Democratic primary ==
=== Candidates ===
==== Nominee ====
- Paul Strauss, incumbent shadow senator

=== Results ===
Democratic primary
Party	Candidate	Votes	%
Democratic	Paul Strauss (incumbent)	102,765	97.28
Write-in		2,876	2.72
Total votes		105,641	100.00

== Republican primary ==
=== Candidates ===
==== Nominee ====
- Robert Simmons, small business owner and candidate for city council in 2024

=== Results ===
Republican primary
Party	Candidate	Votes	%
	Write-in	684	100.00
Total votes		684	100.00

== Statehood Green primary ==
=== Results ===
Statehood Green primary
Party	Candidate	Votes	%
	Write-in	220	100.00
Total votes		220	100.00

== General election ==
=== Results ===
2026 United States Shadow Senator election in the District of Columbia
Party	Candidate	Votes	%
Democratic	Paul Strauss (incumbent)	171,550	92.14
Republican	Robert Simmons	12,470	6.70
Write-in		2,160	1.16
Total votes		186,180	100.00
