= District of Columbia Olympic Committee =

The District of Columbia Olympic Committee was launched in 2005 as an effort to call attention to District of Columbia's lack of voting rights in the U.S. Congress.

The District of Columbia, American Samoa, Puerto Rico, Guam, the U.S. Virgin Islands, and the Northern Mariana Islands, while part of the United States, each only have one, nonvoting delegate in the U.S. House of Representatives. However, unlike those other American territories (except the Northern Marianas), D.C. lacks its own "National" Olympic Committee.

In late 2005, a group of D.C. residents, headed by Mike Panetta, launched the DC Olympic Committee (DCOC) with their first team, curling. Started with D.C. voting rights in mind, this advocacy group seeks to gain recognition from the International Olympic Committee (IOC) as an official member.

In 2008, the sport chosen was racewalking.

== See also ==
- District of Columbia voting rights
