= 2020 United States Shadow Senator election in the District of Columbia =

- November 3, 2020
- Turnout: 59.9% ▲26.7pp
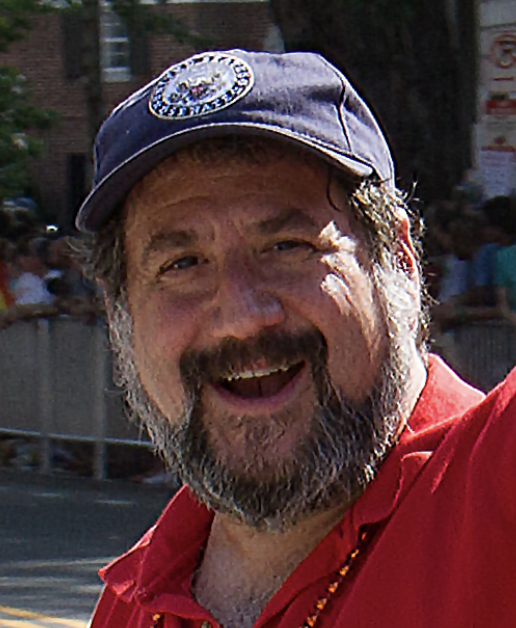

Nominee	Paul Strauss	Eleanor Ory	Cornelia Weiss
Party	Democratic	DC Statehood Green	Republican
Popular vote	251,991	31,151	24,168
Percentage	81.17%	10.03%	7.78%
- Strauss: 60–70% 70–80% 80–90%
Shadow Senator before election
Paul Strauss
Democratic
Elected Shadow Senator
Paul Strauss
Democratic

The 2020 United States Shadow Senator election in the District of Columbia took place on November 3, 2020, to elect a shadow member to the United States Senate to represent the District of Columbia. The member was only recognized by the District of Columbia and not officially sworn or seated by the United States Senate. Paul Strauss won election to a fifth term with the largest percentage and number of votes in his career.

== Primary elections ==
The party primaries took place on June 2, 2020. Because of the ongoing COVID-19 pandemic voting by mail was encouraged. Democrat Paul Strauss, the incumbent shadow senator, and D.C. Statehood Green candidate Eleanor Ory were unopposed in their party primaries. Cornelia Weiss won a write-in campaign in the Republican primary.

== General election ==
The general election took place on November 3, 2020.

=== Candidates ===
- Eleanor Ory (D.C. Statehood Green)
- Paul Strauss (Democratic), incumbent
- Cornelia Weiss (Republican)

=== Results ===
General election results
Party	Candidate	Votes	%
Democratic	Paul Strauss (Incumbent)	251,991	81.17%
DC Statehood Green	Eleanor Ory	31,151	10.03%
Republican	Cornelia Weiss	24,168	7.78%
Write-in		3,154	1.02%
Total votes		310,464	100.0%
Democratic hold			

==== Results by ward ====
Ward	Paul Strauss Democratic		Cornelia Weiss Republican		Various candidates Other parties	
Ward	#	%	#	%	#	%
Ward 1	30,742	80.11%	2,363	6.16%	5,270	13.73%
Ward 2	22,152	76.75%	3,905	13.53%	2,806	9.73%
Ward 3	29,767	76.79%	4,949	12.77%	4,049	10.44%
Ward 4	34,213	83.59%	2,100	5.13%	4,617	11.28%
Ward 5	35,936	83.47%	2,160	5.02%	4,957	11.51%
Ward 6	42,647	77.61%	6,212	11.3%	6,094	11.09%
Ward 7	30,455	86.44%	1,206	3.42%	3,570	10.13%
Ward 8	26,079	86.09%	1,273	4.2%	2,942	9.71%
Total	251,991	81.17%	24,168	7.78%	34,305	11.05%
