= 2018 United States Shadow Representative election in the District of Columbia =

- November 6, 2018
- Turnout: 46.3% ▼29.0 pp
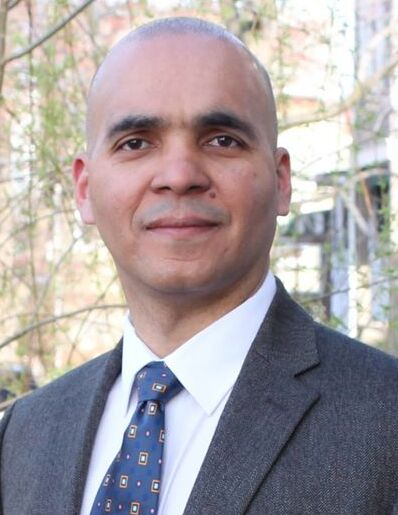
Nominee	Franklin Garcia
Party	Democratic
Popular vote	197,299
Percentage	96.9%
- Garcia: 80–90% >90%
Representative before election
Franklin Garcia
Democratic
Elected Representative
Franklin Garcia
Democratic

On November 6, 2018, the District of Columbia held a U.S. House of Representatives election for its shadow representative. Unlike its non-voting delegate, the shadow representative is only recognized by the district and is not officially sworn or seated. Incumbent Shadow Representative Franklin Garcia won reelection unopposed.

== Primary elections ==
=== Democratic primary ===
==== Candidates ====
- Franklin Garcia, incumbent Shadow Representative (since 2015)

==== Results ====
District of Columbia Shadow Representative Democratic primary election, 2018
Party	Candidate	Votes	%
Democratic	Franklin Garcia (incumbent)	62,424	97.4
Democratic	Write-ins	1,637	2.6
Total votes		64,061	100.0

=== Other primaries ===
The Republican, Libertarian, and D.C. Statehood Green parties all held primaries, but no candidates declared.

== Other candidates ==
Independent write-in candidate Erik Metzroth was the only opposition to Franklin Garcia. Metzroth campaigned alleging that Garcia had done too little to advance the cause of DC statehood. Metzroth also criticized local media for not reporting on his campaign. The final number of write-in votes cast for Metzroth was unreported.

=== Write-in ===
- Erik Metzroth (not recognized as candidate by Board of Elections)

== General election ==
The general election took place on November 6, 2018. Garcia was the only candidate on the ballot and won reelection to a third term.

=== Results ===
General election results
Party	Candidate	Votes	%
Democratic	Franklin Garcia (incumbent)	197,299	96.9
Write-in		6,238	3.1
Total votes		203,537	100.0%
