= 2021 Puerto Rican congressional delegation election =

Election to determine Senators in Puerto Rico

A special election to elect shadow senators and shadow representatives from Puerto Rico was held on May 16, 2021. Voters chose two special delegates to the United States Senate and four special delegates to the United States House of Representatives. Their work is to demand that the US Congress respect and enforce the results of the 2020 status referendum, and admit Puerto Rico as the 51st state of the Union.

== Background ==
In the 2020 general election, the 6th political status referendum was held, where the option to pursue statehood won with 52.52%. After that, on February 15, 2021, the Commission on Elections (CEE) certified that there would be a non-partisan special election to elect the delegates. The CEE did not have any funds to pay for the event, and the financial oversight board denied their request for 6.6 million USD, so governor Pedro Pierluisi used money from the general budget of the island to fund it, action which the Popular Democratic Party (PPD) condemned.

In the weeks leading up to the election, various politicians began write-in campaigns. Surprisingly, former governor Ricardo Rosselló, who resigned in 2019 because of Telegramgate, announced he would run for the House of Representative delegation. In addition to Rosselló, former San Juan Mayor Jorge Santini and former at-large senator Miriam Ramírez de Ferrer also announced campaigns for House of Representatives delegate and Senate delegate respectively.

== Candidates ==
Four candidates qualified for the senatorial ballot and six for the House delegation ballot. Voters were allowed to mark up to two choices for senator and up to four choices for member of Congress.

=== Delegates for the US Senate ===
- Zoraida Buxó (R)
- Victor Pérez Delegado (PNP/R)
- Roberto López (PNP),
- Melinda Romero (PNP/D)

=== Delegates for the US House of Representatives ===
- Roberto Lefranc Fortuño (PNP/R)
- Elizabeth Torres (Independent)
- Adriel Vélez (PNP)
- Mayita Meléndez (PNP/D), former mayor of Ponce
- Jorge Iván Rodríguez (PNP/R)
- Ricardo Marrero (PNP)

== Results ==
In the preliminary results from election night, Melinda Romero and Zoraida Buxó won the Senate race, and Elizabeth Torres, Roberto Lefranc Fortuño, Mayita Meléndez and Adriel Vélez won the House of Representatives race.

Some 73,745 write-in votes were cast in the House of Representatives election, with former governor Ricardo Rosselló reportedly earning enough write-in votes to win a seat in the delegation. However, challengers to Rosselló have questioned his eligibility claiming he lives in Virginia (not Puerto Rico or Washington, D.C., as required by the law establishing the shadow delegation) and that he is registered to vote there, not in Puerto Rico. Despite this, Puerto Rico election authorities indicated they were not empowered to disqualify him as a write-in candidate. On June 1, 2021, The Puerto Rico State Commission on Elections certified that Rosselló received 53,823 write-in votes, earning a seat in the delegation over Vélez.

This election had the lowest recorded voter turnout for a Puerto Rican election ever (3.92%), breaking the record previously held by the 2017 Puerto Rican status referendum (23.23%).

=== US Senate delegation ===
US Senate delegation election
Party	Candidate	Votes	%
New Progressive	Melinda Romero Donnelly	57,916	34.26
Republican	Zoraida Buxó	46,222	27.35
New Progressive	Victor Pérez Delegado	27,900	16.51
New Progressive	Roberto López	19,565	11.57
Write-in		17,438	10.31
Total votes		92,448	100.00

=== US House of Representatives delegation ===
US House of Representatives delegation election
Party	Candidate	Votes	%
Independent	Elizabeth Torres Rodriguez	63,520	19.79
New Progressive	Ricardo Rosselló (write-in)	53,823	16.77
New Progressive	Roberto Lefranc Fortuño	47,853	14.91
New Progressive	María Meléndez	42,263	13.17
New Progressive	Adriel Vélez	31,591	9.84
New Progressive	Jorge Iván Rodríguez	31,213	9.72
New Progressive	Ricardo Marrero	30,783	9.59
Write-in		19,928	6.21
Total votes		92,448	100.00

== Extended congressional delegation for Puerto Rico ==
In September 2021, the official delegation created the extended congressional delegation for Puerto Rico as part of the initiatives they are putting in place to create a big grassroots movement for Puerto Rico's statehood. This delegation is not elected and its members take part on a pro-bono basis since the delegation is intended for social activists who embrace the Puerto Rican cause. This initiative has been fully supported by former governor Ricardo Rossello, former mayor Maria "Mayita" Melendez and delegates Melinda Romero and Lefranc Fortuño. Some notable extended delegates include:

- Geovanny Vicente, political strategist and CNN columnist and associate professor for Columbia University.
- U.S. Army veteran Nixon Rosado
- Roxanna Soto Aguilu, Human Rights Advocate
