= 1990 United States Shadow Representative election in the District of Columbia =

- November 6, 1990

Nominee	Charles Moreland	Howard Lamar Jones	Tom Chorlton
Party	Democratic	Republican	DC Statehood
Popular vote	92,764	17,867	15,535
Percentage	73.53%	14.16%	12.31%
Shadow Representative before election
Office established
Elected Shadow Representative
Charles Moreland
Democratic

On November 6, 1990, the District of Columbia held a U.S. House of Representatives election for its shadow representative. Unlike its non-voting delegate, the shadow representative is only recognized by the district and is not officially sworn or seated. Democratic nominee Charles Moreland won the election by a large margin against his opponents.

== Primary elections ==
Primary elections were held on September 12, 1990.

=== Democratic primary ===
==== Candidates ====
- Deairich "Dee" Hunter, Ward 1 Advisory Neighborhood Commission member
- Charles Moreland, political consultant & attorney

==== Results ====
Initially, Moreland and Hunter were tied at 48% before Moreland was able to secure the nomination. The exact results of the primary are unknown.

=== Statehood Party primary ===
Tom Chorlton, a registered lobbyist, was the only Statehood Party candidate for representative and thus won the nomination.

=== Republican primary ===
Howard Lamar Jones, a clinical psychologist, was unopposed in the GOP contest for representative and so won the nomination.

== General election ==
The general election took place on November 6, 1990. Democratic nominee Charles Moreland won the election by a margin of 74,897 votes against his foremost opponent Republican nominee Howard Lamar Jones, thereby gaining Democratic control over the new office of Shadow Representative. Moreland's term began on January 3, 1991.

=== Results ===
General election results
Party	Candidate	Votes	%
Democratic	Charles J. Moreland	92,764	73.53
Republican	Howard Lamar Jones	17,867	14.16
DC Statehood	Tom Chorlton	15,535	12.31
Total votes		126,166	100.00%
