= Shadow congressperson =

Delegates of U.S. territories or Washington, D.C. seeking statehood

The posts of shadow United States senator and shadow United States representative are held by elected or appointed government officials from subnational polities of the United States that lack congressional vote. While these officials are not seated in either chamber of Congress, they seek recognition for their subnational polity, up to full statehood. This would enfranchise them with full voting rights on the floor of the U.S. House and Senate, alongside existing states. As of 2021, only the District of Columbia and Puerto Rico have authorized shadow delegations to Congress.

This is distinct from shadow delegates, who are elected or appointed from subnational polities of the United States to seek non-voting participation in the House. As of 2024, only the Cherokee Nation and the United Keetoowah Band of Cherokee Indians elect shadow delegates.

== History ==
Historically, shadow members of Congress were elected by organized incorporated territories prior to their admission to the Union. From its origins in Tennessee, this approach is sometimes known as the Tennessee Plan.

The first shadow senators, William Blount and William Cocke of the Southwest Territory, were elected in March 1796 before being seated as senators representing the newly formed state of Tennessee. Michigan, California, Minnesota, Oregon, and Alaska likewise elected shadow senators before statehood. The Alaska Territory also elected the first shadow U.S. representative, Ralph Julian Rivers, in 1956. All were eventually seated in Congress as voting members, except for Alaska shadow senator William A. Egan, who instead became governor.

| Territory | Office | Name | Elected | Seated |
|---|---|---|---|---|
| Southwest (now Tennessee) | Senator | William Blount | Mar 28, 1796 | Dec 6, 1796 |
| Southwest (now Tennessee) | Senator | William Cocke | Mar 28, 1796 | Dec 6, 1796 |
| Michigan | Senator | Lucius Lyon | Nov 10, 1835 | Jan 26, 1837 |
| Michigan | Senator | John Norvell | Nov 10, 1835 | Jan 26, 1837 |
| California | Senator | William M. Gwin | Dec 20, 1849 | Sep 10, 1850 |
| California | Senator | John C. Frémont | Dec 20, 1849 | Sep 10, 1850 |
| Minnesota | Senator | James Shields | Dec 19, 1857 | May 12, 1858 |
| Oregon | Senator | Joseph Lane | Jul 5, 1858 | Feb 14, 1859 |
| Oregon | Senator | Delazon Smith | Jul 5, 1858 | Feb 14, 1859 |
| Alaska | Senator | Ernest Gruening | Oct 6, 1956 | Jan 7, 1959 |
| Alaska | Senator | William A. Egan | Oct 6, 1956 | Elected governor in 1958 |
| Alaska | Representative | Ralph J. Rivers | Oct 6, 1956 | Jan 7, 1959 |

== District of Columbia officeholders ==
The election of shadow congresspersons from the District of Columbia is authorized by a state constitution ratified by D.C. voters in 1982 but was never approved by Congress.

=== District of Columbia shadow senators ===
The voters of the District of Columbia elect two shadow U.S. senators who are known as senators by the District of Columbia but are not officially sworn in or seated by the U.S. Senate. Shadow U.S. senators were first elected in 1990.

The incumbent shadow United States senators from the District of Columbia are Paul Strauss and Ankit Jain.

| Class 1 Class 1 senators belong to the electoral cycle that most recently had regular elections in 2006, 2012, 2018, and 2024. The next election will be in 2030. | | | | | | C | Class 2 Class 2 senators belong to the electoral cycle that most recently had regular elections in 2008, 2014, 2020, and 2026. The next election will be in 2032. | | | | | |
| # | Senator | Party | Dates in office | Electoral history | T | C | T | Electoral history | Dates in office | Party | Senator | # |
|---|---|---|---|---|---|---|---|---|---|---|---|---|
| 1 | Florence Pendleton | Democratic | Jan 3, 1991 – Jan 3, 2007 | Elected in 1990. | 1 | 102nd | 1 | Elected in 1990. Retired. | Jan 3, 1991 – Jan 3, 1997 | Democratic | Jesse Jackson | 1 |
| 1 | Florence Pendleton | Democratic | Jan 3, 1991 – Jan 3, 2007 | Elected in 1990. | 1 | 103rd | 1 | Elected in 1990. Retired. | Jan 3, 1991 – Jan 3, 1997 | Democratic | Jesse Jackson | 1 |
| 1 | Florence Pendleton | Democratic | Jan 3, 1991 – Jan 3, 2007 | Re-elected in 1994. | 2 | 104th | 1 | Elected in 1990. Retired. | Jan 3, 1991 – Jan 3, 1997 | Democratic | Jesse Jackson | 1 |
| 1 | Florence Pendleton | Democratic | Jan 3, 1991 – Jan 3, 2007 | Re-elected in 1994. | 2 | 105th | 2 | Elected in 1996. | Jan 3, 1997 – present | Democratic | Paul Strauss | 2 |
| 1 | Florence Pendleton | Democratic | Jan 3, 1991 – Jan 3, 2007 | Re-elected in 1994. | 2 | 106th | 2 | Elected in 1996. | Jan 3, 1997 – present | Democratic | Paul Strauss | 2 |
| 1 | Florence Pendleton | Democratic | Jan 3, 1991 – Jan 3, 2007 | Re-elected in 2000. Was not re-nominated as a Democrat. Lost re-election bid as an independent. | 3 | 107th | 2 | Elected in 1996. | Jan 3, 1997 – present | Democratic | Paul Strauss | 2 |
| 1 | Florence Pendleton | Democratic | Jan 3, 1991 – Jan 3, 2007 | Re-elected in 2000. Was not re-nominated as a Democrat. Lost re-election bid as an independent. | 3 | 108th | 3 | Re-elected in 2002. | Jan 3, 1997 – present | Democratic | Paul Strauss | 2 |
| 1 | Florence Pendleton | Democratic | Jan 3, 1991 – Jan 3, 2007 | Re-elected in 2000. Was not re-nominated as a Democrat. Lost re-election bid as an independent. | 3 | 109th | 3 | Re-elected in 2002. | Jan 3, 1997 – present | Democratic | Paul Strauss | 2 |
| 2 | Mike Brown | Democratic | Jan 3, 2007 – Jan 3, 2025 | Elected in 2006. | 4 | 110th | 3 | Re-elected in 2002. | Jan 3, 1997 – present | Democratic | Paul Strauss | 2 |
| 2 | Mike Brown | Democratic | Jan 3, 2007 – Jan 3, 2025 | Elected in 2006. | 4 | 111th | 4 | Re-elected in 2008. | Jan 3, 1997 – present | Democratic | Paul Strauss | 2 |
| 2 | Mike Brown | Democratic | Jan 3, 2007 – Jan 3, 2025 | Elected in 2006. | 4 | 112th | 4 | Re-elected in 2008. | Jan 3, 1997 – present | Democratic | Paul Strauss | 2 |
| 2 | Mike Brown | Democratic | Jan 3, 2007 – Jan 3, 2025 | Re-elected in 2012. | 5 | 113th | 4 | Re-elected in 2008. | Jan 3, 1997 – present | Democratic | Paul Strauss | 2 |
| 2 | Mike Brown | Independent | Jan 3, 2007 – Jan 3, 2025 | Re-elected in 2012. | 5 | 114th | 5 | Re-elected in 2014. | Jan 3, 1997 – present | Democratic | Paul Strauss | 2 |
| 2 | Mike Brown | Democratic | Jan 3, 2007 – Jan 3, 2025 | Re-elected in 2012. | 5 | 115th | 5 | Re-elected in 2014. | Jan 3, 1997 – present | Democratic | Paul Strauss | 2 |
| 2 | Mike Brown | Democratic | Jan 3, 2007 – Jan 3, 2025 | Re-elected in 2018. Retired. | 6 | 116th | 5 | Re-elected in 2014. | Jan 3, 1997 – present | Democratic | Paul Strauss | 2 |
| 2 | Mike Brown | Democratic | Jan 3, 2007 – Jan 3, 2025 | Re-elected in 2018. Retired. | 6 | 117th | 6 | Re-elected in 2020. | Jan 3, 1997 – present | Democratic | Paul Strauss | 2 |
| 2 | Mike Brown | Democratic | Jan 3, 2007 – Jan 3, 2025 | Re-elected in 2018. Retired. | 6 | 118th | 6 | Re-elected in 2020. | Jan 3, 1997 – present | Democratic | Paul Strauss | 2 |
| 3 | Ankit Jain | Democratic | Jan 3, 2025 – present | Elected in 2024. | 7 | 119th | 6 | Re-elected in 2020. | Jan 3, 1997 – present | Democratic | Paul Strauss | 2 |
| 3 | Ankit Jain | Democratic | Jan 3, 2025 – present | Elected in 2024. | 7 | 120th | 7 | Re-elected in 2026. | Jan 3, 1997 – present | Democratic | Paul Strauss | 2 |

=== District of Columbia shadow representatives ===
The voters of the District of Columbia elect one shadow representative who is recognized as equivalent to U.S. representatives by the District of Columbia but is not recognized by the U.S. government as an actual member of the House of Representatives. A shadow representative was first elected in 1990. Inaugural office-holder Charles Moreland held the seat for two terms. In November 2020, Oye Owolewa was elected to succeed retiring shadow representative Franklin Garcia.

D.C.'s shadow U.S. representative should not be confused with the non-voting delegate who represents the district in Congress.

| Representative | Party | Term | Congress | Electoral history |
|---|---|---|---|---|
| Charles Moreland | Democratic | January 3, 1991 – January 3, 1995 | 102nd 103rd | Elected in 1990. Re-elected in 1992. Retired. |
| John Capozzi | Democratic | January 3, 1995 – January 3, 1997 | 104th | Elected in 1994. Retired. |
| Sabrina Sojourner | Democratic | January 3, 1997 – January 3, 1999 | 105th | Elected in 1996. Retired. |
| Tom Bryant | Democratic | January 3, 1999 – January 3, 2001 | 106th | Elected in 1998. Retired. |
| Ray Browne | Democratic | January 3, 2001 – January 3, 2007 | 107th 108th 109th | Elected in 2000. Re-elected in 2002. Re-elected in 2004. Retired. |
| Mike Panetta | Democratic | January 3, 2007 – January 3, 2013 | 110th 111th 112th | Elected in 2006. Re-elected in 2008. Re-elected in 2010. Retired. |
| Nate Fleming | Democratic | January 3, 2013 – January 3, 2015 | 113th | Elected in 2012. Retired. |
| Franklin Garcia | Democratic | January 3, 2015 – January 3, 2021 | 114th 115th 116th | Elected in 2014. Re-elected in 2016. Re-elected in 2018. Retired. |
| Oye Owolewa | Democratic | January 3, 2021 – present | 117th 118th 119th | Elected in 2020. Re-elected in 2022. Re-elected in 2024. Retiring at end of term. |
| Franklin Garcia | Democratic | Taking office January 3, 2027 | 120th | Elected again in 2026. |

== Puerto Rico officeholders ==
The posts of shadow representatives and senators for Puerto Rico were created in 2017 as part of a newly formed Puerto Rico Equality Commission to fulfill campaign promises made by the New Progressive Party, which gained control of both the executive and legislative branch in the 2016 elections in part with calls for a status referendum in 2017. Pro-statehood governor Ricardo Rosselló appointed five shadow representatives and two shadow senators with the advice and consent of the Senate of Puerto Rico.

Following the pro-statehood vote in the 2020 Puerto Rican status referendum, the Puerto Rican legislature passed in a lame duck session Law 167 of 2020, replacing the Puerto Rico Equality Commission with the new Commission to the Congressional Delegation of Puerto Rico and establishing an electoral process for shadow delegates to Congress. Although an effort to overturn Law 167 passed the House of Representatives of Puerto Rico in early 2021 after the Popular Democratic Party gained control of the legislature, it did not have enough votes to sustain a threatened veto from pro-statehood governor Pedro Pierluisi.

Popular elections for two shadow senators and four shadow members of Congress will be held on a nonpartisan basis every four years, with the first election held on May 16, 2021, so the delegates can take office on July 1. The law also appropriated funds for the Puerto Rico Federal Affairs Administration to cover the wages of the delegates and serve as their headquarters in Washington, D.C., where they will work on the statehood process with the island's resident commissioner in Congress.

=== Puerto Rico shadow senators ===
The terms for Puerto Rico's shadow senators are not aligned with the classes of United States senators

| | | | | | | C | | | | | | |
| # | Senator | Party | Dates in office | Electoral history | T | C | T | Electoral history | Dates in office | Party | Senator | # |
|---|---|---|---|---|---|---|---|---|---|---|---|---|
| 1 | Zoraida Fonalledas | New Progressive/ Republican | Aug 15, 2017 – Jul 1, 2021 | Appointed in 2017. Successor elected. | 1 | 115th | 1 | Appointed in 2017. Died. | Aug 15, 2017 – May 2, 2021 | New Progressive/ Democratic | Carlos Romero Barceló | 1 |
| 1 | Zoraida Fonalledas | New Progressive/ Republican | Aug 15, 2017 – Jul 1, 2021 | Appointed in 2017. Successor elected. | 1 | 116th | 1 | Appointed in 2017. Died. | Aug 15, 2017 – May 2, 2021 | New Progressive/ Democratic | Carlos Romero Barceló | 1 |
| 1 | Zoraida Fonalledas | New Progressive/ Republican | Aug 15, 2017 – Jul 1, 2021 | Appointed in 2017. Successor elected. | 1 | 117th | 1 | Appointed in 2017. Died. | Aug 15, 2017 – May 2, 2021 | New Progressive/ Democratic | Carlos Romero Barceló | 1 |
| 1 | Zoraida Fonalledas | New Progressive/ Republican | Aug 15, 2017 – Jul 1, 2021 | Appointed in 2017. Successor elected. | 1 | 117th | 2 | May 2, 2021 – Jul 1, 2021 | Vacant | | | |
| 2 | Melinda Romero Donnelly | New Progressive/ Democratic | Jul 1, 2021 – Dec 31, 2024 | Elected in 2021. Term expired. | 2 | 117th | 2 | Elected in 2021. Term expired. | Jul 1, 2021 – Dec 31, 2024 | New Progressive/ Republican | Zoraida Buxó | 2 |
| 2 | Melinda Romero Donnelly | New Progressive/ Democratic | Jul 1, 2021 – Dec 31, 2024 | Elected in 2021. Term expired. | 2 | 118th | 2 | Elected in 2021. Term expired. | Jul 1, 2021 – Dec 31, 2024 | New Progressive/ Republican | Zoraida Buxó | 2 |
| 2 | Melinda Romero Donnelly | New Progressive/ Democratic | Jul 1, 2021 – Dec 31, 2024 | Elected in 2021. Term expired. | 2 | 119th | 2 | Elected in 2021. Term expired. | Jul 1, 2021 – Dec 31, 2024 | New Progressive/ Republican | Zoraida Buxó | 2 |

=== Puerto Rico shadow representatives ===
| Years | Cong. | Shadow House members | | | | | | | | | |
| Years | Cong. | Member | Party | Member | Party | Member | Party | Member | Party | Member | Party |
|---|---|---|---|---|---|---|---|---|---|---|---|
| August 15, 2017 – January 6, 2018 | 115th | Luis Fortuño | New; Progressive/ Republican | Charlie Rodríguez | New; Progressive/ Democratic | Iván Rodríguez | Independent | Pedro Rosselló | New; Progressive/ Democratic | Felix A. Santoni | New; Progressive/ Republican |
| January 6, 2018 – August 20, 2018 | 115th | Luis Fortuño | New; Progressive/ Republican | Charlie Rodríguez | New; Progressive/ Democratic | Iván Rodríguez | Independent | Pedro Rosselló | New; Progressive/ Democratic | Alfonso Aguilar | New; Progressive/ Republican |
| August 20, 2018 – July 22, 2019 | 115th 116th | Luis Fortuño | New; Progressive/ Republican | Charlie Rodríguez | New; Progressive/ Democratic | Luis Berríos-Amadeo | Independent | Pedro Rosselló | New; Progressive/ Democratic | Alfonso Aguilar | New; Progressive/ Republican |
| July 22, 2019 – February 26, 2020 | 116th | Luis Fortuño | New; Progressive/ Republican | Charlie Rodríguez | New; Progressive/ Democratic | Luis Berríos-Amadeo | Independent | Vacant | | Alfonso Aguilar | New; Progressive/ Republican |
| February 26, 2020 – July 1, 2021 | 116th | Luis Fortuño | New; Progressive/ Republican | Charlie Rodríguez | New; Progressive/ Democratic | Luis Berríos-Amadeo | Independent | Vacant | | Vacant | |
| February 26, 2020 – July 1, 2021 | 116th 117th | Luis Fortuño | New; Progressive/ Republican | Charlie Rodríguez | New; Progressive/ Democratic | Luis Berríos-Amadeo | Independent | Vacant | | Vacant | |
| July 1, 2021 – June 26, 2023 | 116th 117th | Elizabeth Torres Rodriguez | New; Progressive/ Republican | Ricardo Rosselló | New; Progressive/ Democratic | Roberto Lefranc Fortuño | New; Progressive/ Republican | María Meléndez | New; Progressive/ Democratic | Seat eliminated | |
| July 1, 2021 – June 26, 2023 | 117th 118th | Elizabeth Torres Rodriguez | New; Progressive/ Republican | Ricardo Rosselló | New; Progressive/ Democratic | Roberto Lefranc Fortuño | New; Progressive/ Republican | María Meléndez | New; Progressive/ Democratic | Seat eliminated | |
| June 26, 2023 – July 17, 2023 | 117th 118th | Vacant | | Ricardo Rosselló | New; Progressive/ Democratic | Roberto Lefranc Fortuño | New; Progressive/ Republican | María Meléndez | New; Progressive/ Democratic | Seat eliminated | |
| July 17, 2023 – December 31, 2024 | 117th 118th | Vacant | | Ricardo Rosselló | New; Progressive/ Democratic | Roberto Lefranc Fortuño | New; Progressive/ Republican | Vacant | | Seat eliminated | |
| January 1, 2025 – present | 118th 119th 120th | Term expired | | | | | | | | Seat eliminated | |

== See also ==
- District of Columbia voting rights
- District of Columbia statehood movement
- Federal voting rights in Puerto Rico
- Statehood movement in Puerto Rico
- Non-voting members of the United States House of Representatives
