= Ankit Jain =

American attorney and politician

United States Shadow Senator from the District of Columbia
- Incumbent
- Assumed office January 3, 2025 Serving with Paul Strauss
- Preceded by: Mike Brown

Personal details
- Born: November 20, 1993 (age 32)
- Party: Democratic
- Education: University of Chicago (BA); Columbia University (JD)

Ankit Jain (born November 20, 1992) is an American voting rights attorney serving as the junior United States shadow senator from the District of Columbia. Elected in 2024, he previously worked as an attorney and served as a member on the Ward 2 Advisory Neighborhood Commission. Jain is the first Asian and Indian-American District-wide elected official in D.C. history.

== Early life and education ==
Jain grew up in Fairfax County, Virginia, to parents who immigrated from India. He graduated from James Madison High School and obtained a bachelor's degree from the University of Chicago in 2015 before getting a Juris Doctor degree from Columbia Law School in 2019. He worked as an attorney for the Sierra Club and organized March for Our Lives events while in college.

== Legal career ==
Jain worked as an attorney for the Sierra Club for four years, working as one of the lead negotiators in securing a settlement that committed the federal government to spending over $1 billion rectifying environmental harm caused by Trump's border wall.

Jain is currently a voting rights attorney supporting the organization FairVote.

== Personal life ==
Jain is a resident of Ward 2 in the District of Columbia.

Party political offices
Preceded by Mike Brown	Democratic nominee for U.S. Shadow Senator from the District of Columbia (Class 1); 2024	Most recent
U.S. Senate
Preceded by Mike Brown	U.S. Shadow Senator (Class 1) from the District of Columbia; 2025–present Served alongside: Paul Strauss	Incumbent
