= 2024 United States Shadow Representative election in the District of Columbia =

- November 5, 2024
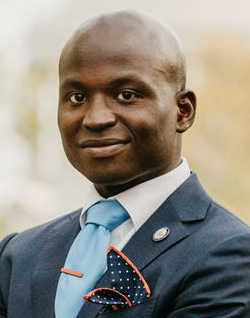

Nominee	Oye Owolewa	Ciprian Ivanof
Party	Democratic	Republican
Popular vote	267,661	25,040
Percentage	90.8%	8.5%
- Owolewa: 80–90% >90% Owolewa: 70–80% 80–90% >90%
Representative before election
Oye Owolewa
Democratic
Elected Representative
Oye Owolewa
Democratic

The 2024 United States Shadow Representative election in the District of Columbia took place on November 5, 2024, to elect a shadow member to the United States House of Representatives to represent the District of Columbia. Unlike its non-voting delegate, the shadow representative is only recognized by the district and is not officially sworn or seated. Incumbent Shadow Representative Oye Owolewa is running for a third term.

== Democratic primary ==
Incumbent Shadow Representative Oye Owolewa faced a primary challenge from Linda Gray, the vice chairwoman of the Washington D.C. Democratic Party, who was his opponent in 2022. He defeated her by a margin of 16%.

=== Nominee ===
- Oye Owolewa, incumbent Shadow Representative

=== Eliminated in primary ===
- Linda Gray, Vice Chair of the DC Democratic Party and candidate for this seat in 2022

=== Results ===

Owolewa

50–60%
60–70%
70–80%

Gray

50–60%

Owolewa

40–50%
50–60%
60–70%
70–80%

Gray

40–50%
50–60%
60–70%

Democratic primary results
Party	Candidate	Votes	%
Democratic	Oye Owolewa (incumbent)	46,582	57.7
Democratic	Linda L. Gray	32,863	40.7
Democratic	Write-ins	1,340	1.7
Total votes		80,785	100

== Republican primary ==
The sole candidate to file for the Republican nomination was attorney Ciprian Ivanof.

=== Nominee ===
- Ciprian Ivanof, attorney

== General election ==
=== Results ===
2024 United States Shadow Representative election in the District of Columbia
Party	Candidate	Votes	%
Democratic	Oye Owolewa	267,661	90.75
Republican	Ciprian Ivanof	25,040	8.49
Write-in		2,253	0.76
Total votes		294,954	100.0%
Democratic hold			

=== Results by ward ===
Ward	Oye Owolewa Democratic		Ciprian Ivanof Republican		Various candidates Other parties	
Ward	#	%	#	%	#	%
Ward 1	34,048	92.67%	2,411	6.56%	284	0.77%
Ward 2	29,378	87.38%	3,979	11.83%	265	0.79%
Ward 3	33,014	86.48%	4,844	12.69%	316	0.83%
Ward 4	35,527	92.5%	2,575	6.7%	304	0.79%
Ward 5	39,012	93.47%	2,456	5.88%	269	0.64%
Ward 6	38,841	87.83%	4,954	11.2%	428	0.97%
Ward 7	32,443	93.81%	1,911	5.53%	228	0.66%
Ward 8	25,398	92.47%	1,910	6.95%	159	0.58%
Total	267,661	90.75%	25,040	8.49%	2,253	0.76%
