= Sabrina Sojourner =

American politician (born 1952)

Shadow Member of the U.S. House of Representatives from the District of Columbia's at-large district
- In office January 3, 1997 – January 3, 1999
- Preceded by: John Capozzi
- Succeeded by: Tom Bryant

Personal details
- Born: October 23, 1952 (age 73)
- Party: Democratic
- Education: University of California, Santa Barbara (BA); Maryland University of Integrative Health (MA)

Sabrina Sojourner (born October 23, 1952) is an American politician who previously served as the District of Columbia's Shadow Representative for the at-large district from January 1997 until 1999, the third individual in the position, preceded by John Capozzi. She served a single term as Shadow Representative, not seeking reelection in 1999. Sojourner is a member of the Democratic Party.

Unlike the non-voting delegate seat, held by representative Eleanor Holmes Norton, the position was created on behalf of the District of Columbia's government and thus is not recognized by the United States Congress. Sojourner was elected to the seat in 1997 at 83% of the vote.

== Early life and education ==
Sojourner was born in Texas but grew up in the San Francisco Bay Area. She briefly attended California State University, Stanislaus, but got married when she was 18 and gave birth to her son, Chris, at 19. Sojourner was subject to physical abuse by her former husband before they separated two years later. Upon leaving the marriage, she chose the name "Sabrina Sojourner" for herself.

In 1976, Sojourner received a bachelor's degree in technical theater and Black theater history from University of California, Santa Barbara and a master's degree in transformative leadership and social change from Maryland University of Integrative Health. She briefly attended law school in the early 1980s.

== Political history ==
Sojourner first considered running for public office shortly after meeting Harvey Milk in the late 1970s.

In 1990, she accepted a position directing the National Organization for Women's diversity program and moved to Washington, D.C. and served as a lobbyist promoting women's issues. She then worked as the legislative aide to Congresswoman Maxine Waters.

From 1992 to 1996, she served as an ex officio member of the District of Columbia Democratic State Committee and was subsequently elected to the committee as an at-large member. Shorty thereafter, she was elected D.C.'s Shadow congressperson, a position in which she lobbied for D.C. statehood and advocated for full Constitutional standing.

Sojourner's Congressional history primarily focused on gay and lesbian participation in the military, substance abuse, civil rights, police brutality, education, and domestic violence. She also focused on HIV/AIDS support for affected individuals in the D.C area and chaired the Metropolitan Washington Regional HIV Health Services Planning Council. Sojourner's main duty as D.C.'s sole Shadow Representative was to lobby congress in passing full federal representation for the District, citing the Tennessee Plan as evidence to elevate the status of D.C.'s citizens.

In 1994 and 1998, she received the Bayard Rustin Political Activism Award from the Black Gay and Lesbian Leadership Forum.

== Personal life ==
Sojourner is an open member of the LGBT community, who came out in 1976. She currently lives with her domestic partner Letitia Gomez. Sojourner also served as an author and poet, writing a poetry collection titled Psychic Scars and Other Mad Thoughts.

Sojourner is Jewish and is a chaplain and hazzan who serves as the spiritual leader at an independent living community and serves unaffiliated Jewish families in the greater Washington, D.C. area, "presiding at interfaith marriages and other ceremonies that more traditional clergy may refuse." She received training at the Davvenen' Leadership Training Institute, part of the Jewish Renewal movement.

She lives in Rockville, MD.

== Electoral history ==
D.C. Shadow Representative Election (1996)
Party	Candidate	Votes	%
Democratic	Sabrina Sojourner	111,413	83.37
Republican	Gloria R. Corn	20,240	15.15
Write-in		1,984	1.48
Total votes		133,637	100.00
Democratic hold			

== See also ==
- Shadow congressperson
- Political party strength in Washington, D.C.

U.S. House of Representatives
Preceded by John Capozzi	Shadow Member of the U.S. House of Representatives from the District of Columbia's at-large congressional district 1997–1999	Succeeded by Tom Bryant
