= Franklin Garcia =

American politician (born 1969)

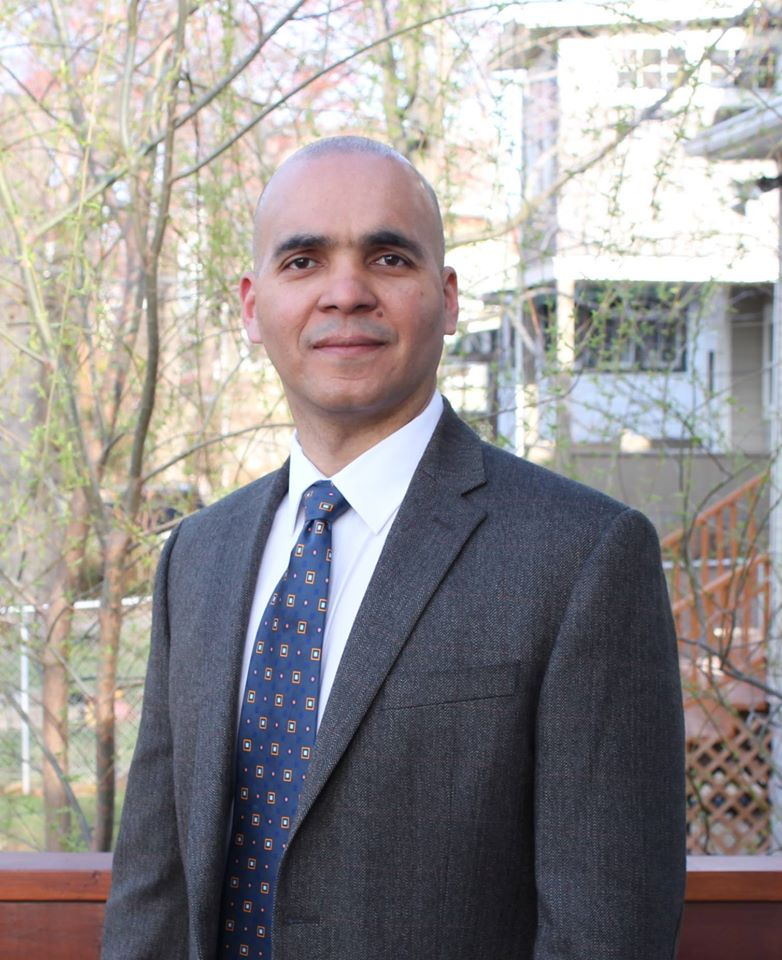

Shadow Member of the U.S. House of Representatives from the District of Columbia's at-large district
- Assuming office January 3, 2027; Elect
- Succeeding: Oye Owolewa
- In office January 3, 2015 – January 3, 2021
- Preceded by: Nate Fleming
- Succeeded by: Oye Owolewa

Personal details
- Born: May 24, 1969 (age 57)
- Party: Democratic
- Education: George Washington University (BS); American University (MA)

Franklin Garcia (born May 24, 1969) is an American politician and three-term shadow member of the U.S. House of Representatives from the District of Columbia, serving from January 2015 to 2021. In 2020, he declined to run for a fourth term as shadow representative in favor of an unsuccessful D.C. Council run. He is a member of the Democratic Party.

== Early life and career ==
Franklin Garcia attended the George Washington University (B.A. Finance) and American University (M.A. Financial Economics for Public Policy). Upon completing his education, Garcia began his political career by holding key positions in the campaigns of various political figures, including Hillary Clinton, former D.C. mayor Adrian Fenty, Dominican president Leonel Fernández and others.

Prior to becoming the District of Columbia's shadow representative, Garcia was the president and founder of the D.C. Latino Caucus and is currently serving as the president of the DC Latino Leadership Council.

=== Writing career ===
Garcia is a well known writer and has contributed to The Huffington Post and Washington Examiner, among other publications. Garcia also writes for the D.C.-area local newspaper El Ojo Latino.

=== DCiReporter ===
Garcia is the founder and producer of the DCTV show, DCiReporter. The show highlights important happenings around the D.C. area. The show has been praised for its hyper-local content, and was awarded the DCTV award for "News Show of the Year" in 2015. The show has also included tributes for local D.C. figures, such as former mayor Marion Barry and civil rights activist Julian Bond.

== D.C. statehood ==
Franklin Garcia was first elected in 2014 as a member of the District of Columbia congressional shadow delegation, serving alongside shadow senators Michael D. Brown and Paul Strauss. Because D.C. is not considered a state, neither Garcia nor his delegation counterparts have a voting seat in Congress. The mission of the delegation is to achieve statehood via the admission of the District of Columbia as the 51st state of the union. Garcia promotes the D.C. statehood mission by public speaking, community outreach events, and also by regularly meeting with fellow U.S. representatives on Capitol Hill to gain co-sponsorship for H.R. 317 (New Columbia Admissions Act.) Garcia informs the public on recent statehood news through the show "D.C. Statehood Today" which airs on DCTV and also streams on YouTube. He was reelected in 2016 and 2018, but declined to run for a fourth term in 2020.

== Philanthropy ==
In addition to his work in statehood, Franklin Garcia has been praised for his service to the community. Garcia is a member of the National Association of Hispanic Journalists (NAHJ) and has also collaborated with local service organizations, including Foundation Angie, an LGBT support group and organization, Carlos Rosario and Richard Wright Public Charter Schools, DC Immersion Program and more. In July 2015, Garcia announced plans for a protest against Donald Trump following Trump's comments on the Latino immigrant population in America. The protest was deemed successful and Garcia was praised for acting as a voice for the Latino community.

Garcia has also contributed to local organizations during the holidays, including the annual event "Tiempo de Dar" where hundreds of toys are given to children in the metropolitan D.C. area.

U.S. House of Representatives
Preceded by Nate Fleming	Shadow Member of the U.S. House of Representatives from the District of Columbia's at-large congressional district 2015–2021	Succeeded by Oye Owolewa
Preceded by Oye Owolewa	Shadow Member of the U.S. House of Representatives from the District of Columbia's at-large congressional district Elect; Taking office 2027	Elect
