= Mike Panetta =

American politician (born 1971)

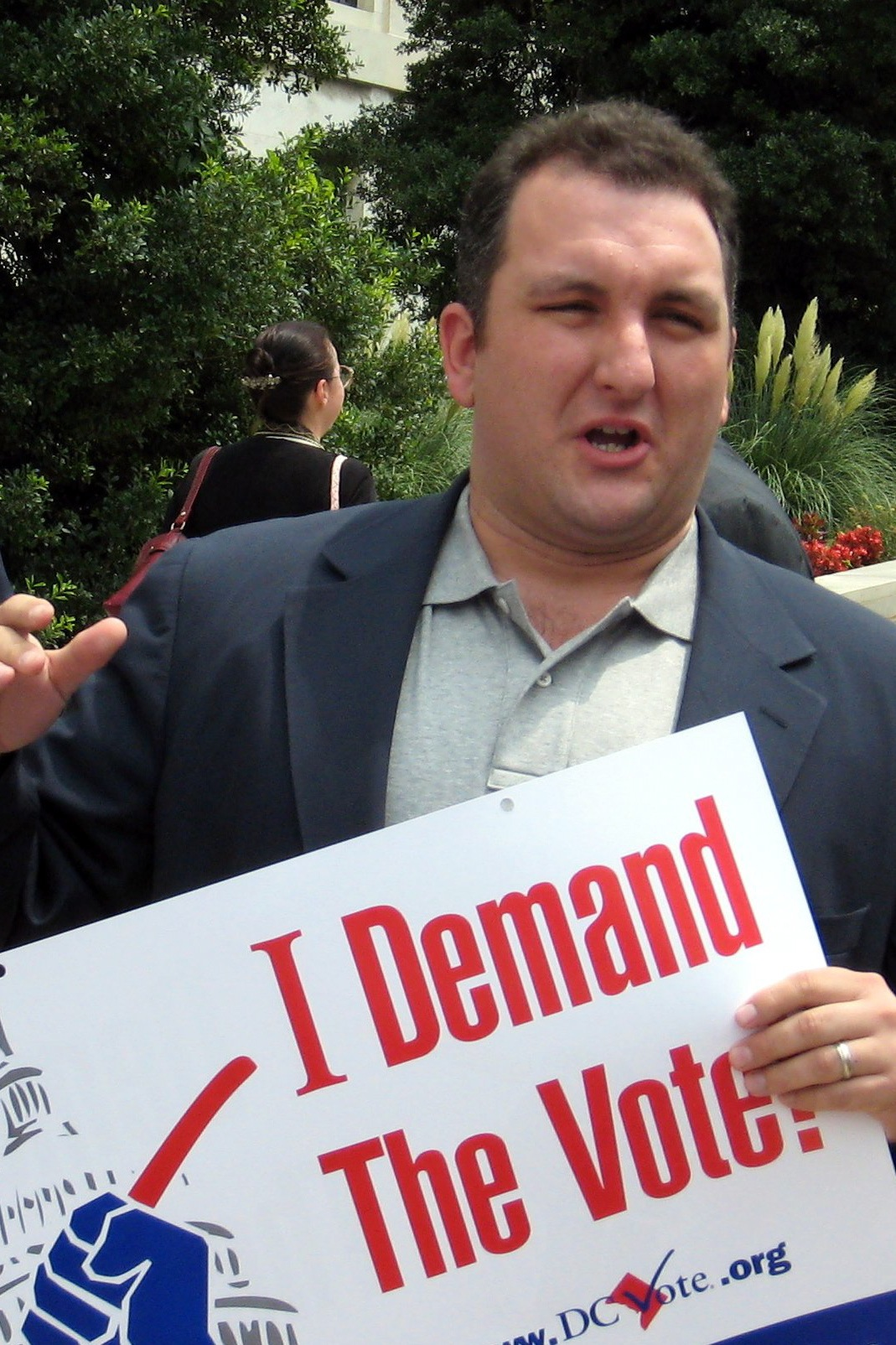

Shadow Member of the U.S. House of Representatives from the District of Columbia's at-large district
- In office January 3, 2007 – January 3, 2013
- Preceded by: Ray Browne
- Succeeded by: Nate Fleming

Personal details
- Born: Michael Joseph Panetta; July 14, 1971 (age 54)
- Party: Democratic
- Education: American University (BA, MA)
- Website: Campaign website

Michael Joseph Panetta (born July 14, 1971) is a former District of Columbia shadow representative, having served from 2007 to 2013. Though elected by the citizens of Washington, Panetta was not recognized by Congress. A shadow representative is different from a delegate to Congress, an office held by Eleanor Holmes Norton while Panetta was shadow representative. The office of delegate is created by the U.S. House of Representatives and delegates are recognized by that body.

== Political career ==
Panetta has run several high-profile campaigns for D.C. representation, including starting the District of Columbia Olympic Committee and leading efforts to rebrand RFK Stadium as "Taxation Without Representation Field". Panetta has pledged to make District of Columbia voting rights a national issue that is embraced by progressive activists across the country.

Panetta was reelected in 2008, facing no opposition in the Democratic primary and defeating D.C. Statehood Green Party candidate Joyce Robinson-Paul in the November election by 86 to 13 percent.

== Electoral history ==
District of Columbia Shadow Representative Democratic primary election, 2006
Party	Candidate	Votes	%
Democratic	Mike Panetta	36,373	47.00
Democratic	John J. Forster (withdrawn)	25,554	33.02
Democratic	James S. Bubar	13,493	17.43
Write-in		1,973	2.55
Total votes		77,393	100.00
n/a	Overvotes	18	
n/a	Undervotes	29,314	

District of Columbia Shadow Representative election, 2006
Party	Candidate	Votes	%	±%
Democratic	Mike Panetta	82,759	77.47	−8.83
DC Statehood Green	Keith R. Ware	13,511	12.65	−0.18
Republican	Nelson Rimensnyder	9,700	9.08	+9.08
Write-in		862	0.81	−0.6
Total votes		218,188	100.00	
n/a	Overvotes	35		
n/a	Undervotes	15,471		

District of Columbia Shadow Representative Democratic primary election, 2008
Party	Candidate	Votes	%
Democratic	Mike Panetta	30,223	98.05
Write-in		602	1.95
Total votes		30,825	100.00
n/a	Overvotes	2	
n/a	Undervotes	10,582	

District of Columbia Shadow Representative Democratic primary election, 2008
Party	Candidate	Votes	%	±%
Democratic	Mike Panetta	187,362	85.87	+8.40
DC Statehood Green	Joyce Robinson-Paul	28,703	13.16	+0.51
Write-in		2,123	0.97	+0.16
Total votes		218,188	100.00	
n/a	Overvotes	81		
n/a	Undervotes	46,993		

District of Columbia Shadow Representative Democratic primary election, 2010
Party	Candidate	Votes	%
Democratic	Mike Panetta	57,666	55.80
Democratic	Nate Bennett-Fleming	43,243	41.85
Write-in		2,427	2.35
Total votes		103,336	100.00

District of Columbia Shadow Representative election, 2010
Party	Candidate	Votes	%	±%
Democratic	Mike Panetta	101,207	82.35	−3.52
Republican	Nelson Rimensnyder	11,094	9.03	N/A
DC Statehood Green	Joyce Robinson-Paul	9,489	7.72	−5.44
Write-in		1,103	0.90	−0.07
Total votes		122,893	100.00	

U.S. House of Representatives
Preceded by Ray Browne	Shadow Member of the U.S. House of Representatives from the District of Columbia's at-large congressional district 2007–2013	Succeeded by Nate Fleming
