= Ray Browne (politician) =

American politician (1939–2010)

Shadow Member of the U.S. House of Representatives from the District of Columbia's at-large district
- In office January 3, 2001 – January 3, 2007
- Preceded by: Tom Bryant
- Succeeded by: Mike Panetta

Personal details
- Born: 1939 Washington, D.C., U.S.
- Died: February 15, 2010 (aged 71) Washington, D.C., U.S.
- Party: Democratic
- Education: University of Maryland, College Park

Ray Browne (1939 – February 15, 2010) was an American businessman and politician who served as a Shadow Member of the United States House of Representatives from 2001 until his retirement in 2007. He was a member of the Democratic Party, and a staunch supporter of the D.C Statehood Movement.

He also served as an ANC Commissioner and as a mediator for the D.C. Superior Court. Browne died on February 15, 2010.

U.S. House of Representatives
Preceded by Tom Bryant	Shadow Member of the U.S. House of Representatives from the District of Columbia's at-large congressional district 2001–2007	Succeeded by Mike Panetta
