= Paul Strauss =

American politician (born 1964)

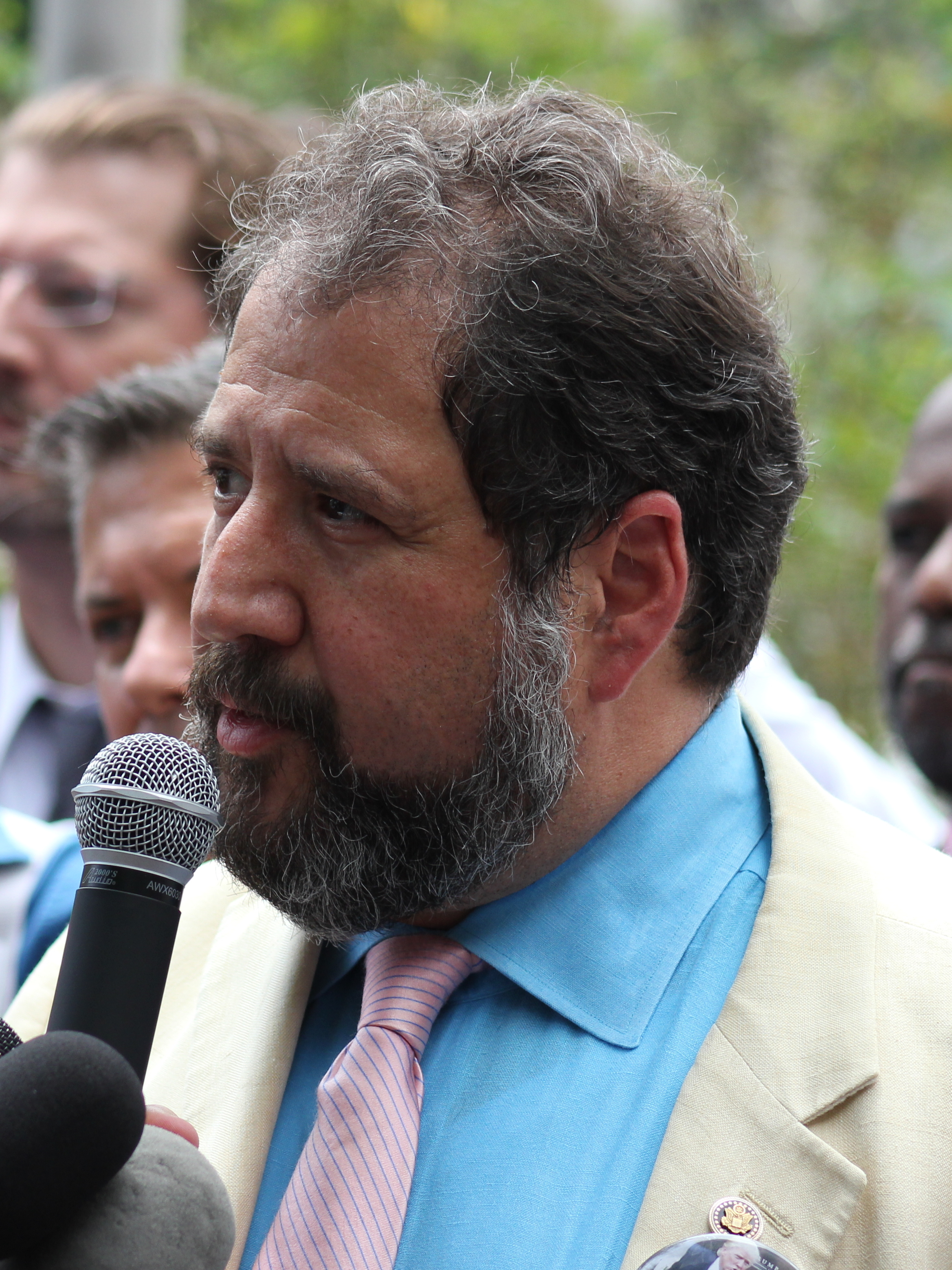
- Strauss in 2015

United States Shadow Senator from the District of Columbia
- Incumbent
- Assumed office January 3, 1997 Serving with Ankit Jain
- Preceded by: Jesse Jackson

Personal details
- Born: Paul Eric Strauss; April 11, 1964 (age 62) New York City, New York, U.S.
- Party: Democratic
- Education: American University (BA, JD)
- Website: Campaign website

Paul Eric Strauss (born April 11, 1964) is an American politician and attorney serving as the senior United States shadow senator from the District of Columbia since 1997. He succeeded Jesse Jackson, the first person to hold the elected position of a shadow senator for Washington, D.C. He is a member of the Democratic Party.

== Early life and education ==
Strauss was born to a Jewish family in Brooklyn, raised on the Upper East Side of Manhattan, and graduated from Dwight School. His father was a painting contractor for Yankee Stadium. As a youth, Strauss was active in politics, volunteering for the election campaigns of Mario Biaggi, Hugh Carey, and Jimmy Carter. At 17, he interned for New York City mayor Ed Koch with his own desk and phone in the Tweed Courthouse. He moved to Washington, D.C., in 1982 at the age of 18, later earning his bachelor's degree (1986) and Juris Doctor (1993) at American University.

== Career ==
Strauss is a former chairperson of the District's Board of Real Property Assessments and Appeals. He has also been a union organizer for Hotel and Restaurant Employees Union Local 25. Strauss is an attorney and principal of the Law Offices of Paul Strauss & Associates, P.C., a law firm specializing in real estate, business, and family law.

In his first political campaign in Washington, D.C., he mobilized other college students to register to vote against raising the drinking age to 21.

=== Shadow Senator ===
Before being elected as a shadow senator in 1996, Strauss served in several locally elected government positions. He served as the at-large member of the D.C. Democratic State Committee, Chairperson of the Democratic Party's D.C. Statehood Committee, Chairperson of Advisory Neighborhood Commission 3E, and Chairperson of Neighborhood Planning Council #3. Strauss was first elected to the Advisory Neighborhood Commission in 1986 as the youngest chairperson and was a commissioner there until 1996.

As one of the District of Columbia's two shadow senators, Strauss lobbies the U.S. Senate and the U.S. House of Representatives on behalf of the citizens of D.C. in their attempt to gain full federal representation, self-determination, and eventually admittance to the Union as the 51st state. Strauss cannot vote on matters before the Senate as a shadow senator.

In 2006, Strauss ran for the Council of the District of Columbia to represent Ward 3. He came in second place in the Democratic primary, receiving 15% of the vote, while Mary Cheh received 44% of the vote.

Strauss was selected to be a superdelegate to the 2008 Democratic National Convention where he endorsed Barack Obama.

Strauss was re-elected in 2008. Strauss received 65% of the vote in the September Democratic primary, while Democratic challenger Phil Pannell received 33%. In the November general election, Strauss faced Republican Nelson F. Rimensnyder, D.C. Statehood Green Party candidate Keith Ware and Libertarian Party Candidate Damien Lincoln Ober. Strauss received 82% of the vote, giving him his most significant margin of victory ever.

Strauss was again re-elected in 2014, with 77.3% of the vote.

In 2014, Strauss launched the "51 Stars" campaign, enlisting the help of 51 celebrities and public figures to support the initiative for D.C. Statehood and endorse the District of Columbia as the fifty-first star on the U.S. flag upon admittance to the Union. Notable endorsers of the public service campaign included Dave Chappelle, Rosario Dawson, Jonathan Banks, and others.

Strauss testified to the U.S. Senate Committee on Homeland Security & Governmental Affairs in 2014 regarding the New Columbia Admission Act of 2013. His testimony argued the historical case for D.C. statehood, saying "We are all Americans. We all deserve to participate in the democracy our nation’s founders set before us. To deny basic rights to the citizens of the National Capital makes a mockery of our attempts to act as a model of democracy for the rest of the world."

In February 2015, Strauss traveled to Iowa to encourage Democratic and Republican party chapters to discuss D.C. statehood at their local caucuses and inspired the Polk County Democrats to pass a resolution supporting D.C. statehood in March. He traveled there again the following year for the 2016 Iowa caucuses, after running political ads from the national "51 Stars" campaign. Working with a new bipartisan group called Iowans for D.C. Statehood, Strauss took the opportunity to address Democratic precincts in Iowa.

At the Iowa caucuses in 2020, Strauss and shadow Senator Michael Donald Brown took over the campaign bus left behind by John Delaney of Maryland, who had exited the presidential race. Decorated with a banner and signs promoting D.C. as the 51st state, the bus was parked outside the Des Moines Marriott Hotel, where hundreds of journalists were staying. Strauss spoke to The Washington Post and said he expected nearly every precinct in every county to pass resolutions in favor of statehood for D.C.

=== International diplomacy ===
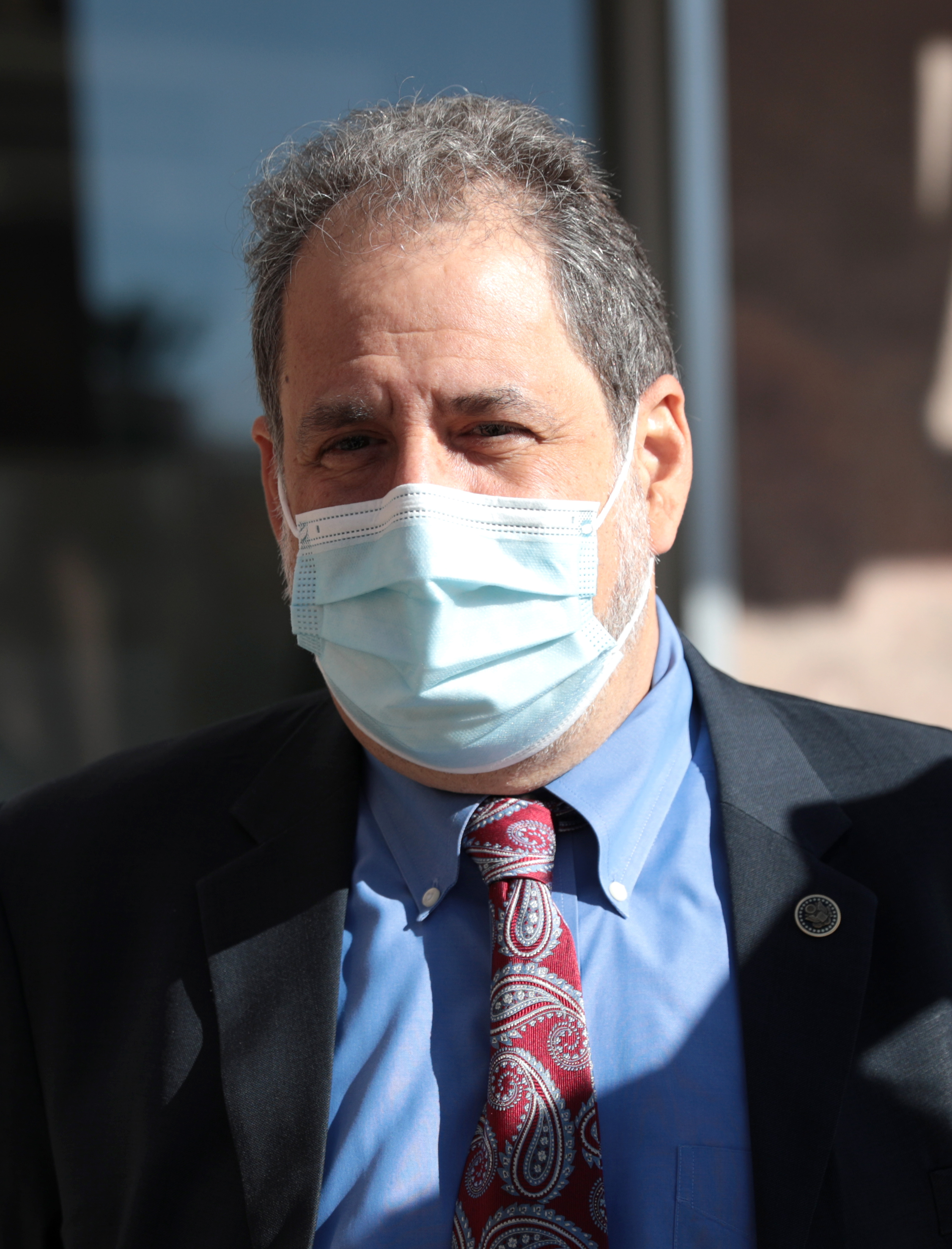
Strauss in January 2022

Strauss has engaged in various efforts on the international stage. In 2014, he visited Nagaland in India to participate in the 3rd biennial NER Agri Expo, an exposition attended by farmers, investors, agriculturists, business houses, and entrepreneurs.

In 2015, Strauss appeared before a panel of the Unrepresented Nations and Peoples Organization (UNPO) and, citing the lack of statehood for Washington, D.C., successfully petitioned for the District of Columbia to become the first and only North American participant in the international body.

In June 2018, Strauss addressed the European Union in Brussels, Belgium to discuss the issue of D.C. statehood. The event was classified as a formal "exchange of views", and was chaired by former Member of the European Parliament Alex Mayer of the United Kingdom in conjunction with the Secretariat of the European Parliament's Delegation for Relations with the U.S. Lucia Parrucci, DC's advocacy officer from the Unrepresented Nations and Peoples Organization, and Richard Schiff, an Emmy Award-winning actor and democracy activist joined Strauss for the presentation. Mayer, a former United Kingdom Labour Party member representing the East of England region, expressed support for D.C. Statehood at a plenary session in the European Union following Strauss's visit, saying "We in the European Parliament call out human rights violations across the world. I see no reason not to do so in this case too. The citizens of D.C. are denied the basic rights that others living in liberal democracies take for granted. It is time that this 200-year injustice was ended."

He is an honorary member of the Global Committee for the Rule of Law.

== Personal life ==
On October 1, 2008, Strauss was arrested for drunken driving. He was found to have a blood-alcohol level at twice the legal level of intoxication. On May 29, 2009, he pleaded guilty to the charge and was sentenced to a 60-day suspended jail sentence, 11 months of supervised probation, a $300 fine, and a $100 fine to be paid to the victims of violent crime compensation fund.

Strauss lives in the Observatory Circle/Glover Park neighborhood in the District.

== Electoral history ==
1996 Shadow Senator election in Washington, D.C.
Primary election
| Party | Candidate | Votes | % |
|---|---|---|---|
| Democratic | Paul Strauss | 23,265 | 73.45 |
| Democratic | Eduardo Burkhart | 7,194 | 22.71 |
| Write-in | | 1,216 | 3.84 |
| Total votes | | 31,675 | 100.00 |
General election
| Democratic | Paul Strauss | 107,217 | 76.01 |
| Republican | Gloria R. Corn | 19,044 | 13.50 |
| Umoja | George Pope | 13,148 | 9.32 |
| Write-in | | 1,653 | 1.17 |
| Total votes | | 141,062 | 100.00 |
| Democratic hold | | | |

2002 Shadow Senator election in Washington, D.C.
Primary election
| Party | Candidate | Votes | % |
|---|---|---|---|
| Democratic | Paul Strauss (incumbent) | 47,787 | 65.87 |
| Democratic | Pete Ross | 22,633 | 31.20 |
| Write-in | | 2,128 | 2.93 |
| Total votes | | 72,548 | 100.00 |
General election
| Democratic | Paul Strauss (incumbent) | 91,434 | 77.32 |
| Republican | Norma M. Sasaki | 13,966 | 11.81 |
| DC Statehood Green | Joyce Robinson-Paul | 11,277 | 9.54 |
| Write-in | | 1,582 | 1.34 |
| Total votes | | 118,259 | 100.00 |
| Democratic hold | | | |

2006 Washington, D.C. City Council Ward 3 primary election
| Party | Candidate | Votes | % |
|---|---|---|---|
| Democratic | Mary Cheh | 6,462 | 44.28 |
| Democratic | Paul Strauss | 2,110 | 14.46 |
| Democratic | Sam Brooks | 1,191 | 8.16 |
| Democratic | Robert Gordon | 1,159 | 7.94 |
| Democratic | Cathy Wiss | 1,158 | 7.93 |
| Democratic | Erik S. Gaull | 1,023 | 7.01 |
| Democratic | Bill Rice | 954 | 6.54 |
| Democratic | Eric Goulet | 490 | 3.36 |
| Democratic | Jonathan Rees | 32 | 0.22 |
| Write-in | | 15 | 0.10 |
| Total votes | | 14,594 | 100.00 |

2008 Shadow Senator election in Washington, D.C.
Primary election
| Party | Candidate | Votes | % |
|---|---|---|---|
| Democratic | Paul Strauss (incumbent) | 22,811 | 64.82 |
| Democratic | Philip Pannell | 11,949 | 33.96 |
| Write-in | | 430 | 1.22 |
| Total votes | | 35,190 | 100.00 |
General election
| Democratic | Paul Strauss (incumbent) | 183,519 | 80.82 |
| Republican | Nelson F. Rimensnyder | 18,601 | 8.19 |
| DC Statehood Green | Keith Ware | 16,881 | 7.43 |
| Libertarian | Damien Lincoln Ober | 5,915 | 2.60 |
| Write-in | | 2,164 | 0.95 |
| Total votes | | 227,080 | 100.00 |
| Democratic hold | | | |

2014 Shadow Senator election in Washington, D.C.
Primary election
| Party | Candidate | Votes | % |
|---|---|---|---|
| Democratic | Paul Strauss (incumbent) | 41,292 | 59.02 |
| Democratic | Pete Ross | 26,809 | 38.32 |
| Write-in | | 1,863 | 2.66 |
| Total votes | | 69,964 | 100.00 |
General election
| Democratic | Paul Strauss (incumbent) | 116,901 | 76.40 |
| DC Statehood Green | David Schwartzman | 15,710 | 10.27 |
| independent (politician) | Glenda Richmond | 10,702 | 6.99 |
| Libertarian | John Daniel | 7,826 | 5.11 |
| Write-in | | 1,864 | 1.22 |
| Total votes | | 153,003 | 100.00 |
| Democratic hold | | | |

2020 Shadow Senator election in Washington, D.C.
Primary election
| Party | Candidate | Votes | % |
|---|---|---|---|
| Democratic | Paul Strauss (incumbent) | 86,014 | 96.78 |
| Write-in | | 2,860 | 3.22 |
| Total votes | | 88,874 | 100.00 |
General election
| Democratic | Paul Strauss (incumbent) | 251,991 | 81.17 |
| DC Statehood Green | Eleanor Ory | 31,151 | 10.03 |
| Republican | Cornelia Weiss | 24,168 | 7.78 |
| Write-in | | 3,154 | 1.02 |
| Total votes | | 310,464 | 100.00 |
| Democratic hold | | | |

Party political offices
| Preceded by Jesse Jackson | Democratic nominee for U.S. Shadow Senator from the District of Columbia (Class 2); 1996, 2002, 2008, 2014, 2020, 2026 | Most recent |
U.S. Senate
| Preceded by Jesse Jackson | U.S. Shadow Senator (Class 2) from the District of Columbia; 1997–present Served alongside: Florence Pendleton, Mike Brown, Ankit Jain | Incumbent |
