= Overvote =

Spoiled vote in an election

An overvote occurs when one votes for more than the maximum number of selections allowed in a contest. The result is a spoiled vote which is not included in the final tally.

One example of an overvote would be voting for two candidates in a single race with the instruction "Vote for not more than one." Robert's Rules of Order notes that such votes are illegal.

Undervotes combined with overvotes (known as residual votes) can be an academic indicator in evaluating the accuracy of a voting system when recording voter intent.

While an overvote in a plurality voting system or limited voting is always illegal, in certain other electoral methods including approval voting, this style of voting is valid, and thus invalid overvotes are not possible.

In the corporate world, the term "overvote" describes a situation in which someone votes more proxies than they are authorized to, or for more shares than they hold of record.
