= United States Senate elections in the District of Columbia =

The District of Columbia is a political division coterminous with Washington, D.C., the capital city of the United States. According to the Article One of the Constitution, only states may be represented in the United States Congress. The District of Columbia is not a U.S. state and therefore has no voting representation in the United States Senate. However, it does have a non-voting delegate to represent it in the House.

The majority of residents want the district to become a state and gain full voting representation in Congress. To prepare for this goal, the district has elected shadow senators since 1990. The shadow senator emulates the role of representing the district in the Senate and pushes for statehood alongside the non-voting House delegate and shadow representatives. The district has held 11 shadow senator elections.

The Democratic Party has immense political strength in the district; in each of the shadow senator elections, the district has overwhelmingly voted for the Democratic candidate, with no margin less than 58 percentage points.

== Shadow senator elections ==
Key for parties
Democratic Party – (D)
D.C. Statehood Green Party – (STG)
D.C. Statehood Party – (ST)
Independent candidate – (I)
Republican Party – (R)
Umoja Party – (U)

=== Initial ===
U.S. shadow senator elections (Class I) in the District of Columbia in 1990
Year	Winner 1			Winner 2			Runner-up			Ref.
Year	Candidate	Votes	%	Candidate	Votes	%	Candidate	Votes	%	Ref.
1990	Jesse Jackson (D)	105,633	46.80%	Florence Pendleton (D)	58,451	25.89%	Harry T. Alexander (I)	13,983	6.19%	

=== Class I ===
U.S. shadow senator elections in the District of Columbia from 1994 to present
Year	Winner			Runner-up			Other candidate (Note: For purposes of these lists, other candidates are defined as those who were in third place. Write-in totals are not represented.)			Ref.
Year	Candidate	Votes	%	Candidate	Votes	%	Candidate	Votes	%	Ref.
1994	Florence Pendleton (D)	117,517	74.04%	Julie Finley (R)	24,107	15.19%	Mel Edwards (ST)	15,586	9.82%	
2000	Florence Pendleton (D)	143,578	88.97%	Janet Helms (R)	16,666	10.33%	—N/a	—N/a	—N/a	
2006	Michael Donald Brown (D)	90,336	84.16%	Joyce Robinson-Paul (STG)	15,352	14.30%	—N/a	—N/a	—N/a	
2012	Michael Donald Brown (D)	206,911	79.78%	David Schwartzman (STG)	26,614	10.26%	Nelson Rimensnyder (R)	23,935	9.23%	
2018	Michael Donald Brown (D)	178,573	82.89%	Eleanor Ory (STG)	33,016	15.32%	—N/a	—N/a	—N/a	
2024	Ankit Jain (D)	265,360	89.94%	Nelson Rimensnyder (R)	26,968	9.14%	—N/a	—N/a	—N/a	

=== Class II ===
U.S. shadow senator (Class II) elections in the District of Columbia from 1996 to present
Year	Winner			Runner-up			Other candidate			Ref.
Year	Candidate	Votes	%	Candidate	Votes	%	Candidate	Votes	%	Ref.
1996	Paul Strauss (D)	107,217	76.01%	Gloria R. Corn (R)	19,044	13.50%	George Pope (U)	13,148	9.32%	
2002	Paul Strauss (D)	91,434	77.32%	Joyce Robinson-Paul (STG)	13,966	11.81%	Norma M. Sasaki (R)	11,277	9.54%	
2008	Paul Strauss (D)	183,519	80.82%	Nelson Rimensnyder (R)	18,601	8.19%	Keith Ware (STG)	16,881	7.43%	
2014	Paul Strauss (D)	116,901	76.41%	David Schwartzman (STG)	15,710	10.27%	Glenda Richmond (I)	10,702	6.99%	
2020	Paul Strauss (D)	251,991	81.17%	Eleanor Ory (STG)	31,151	10.03%	Cornelia Weiss (R)	24,168	7.78%	

=== Graph ===
The following graph shows the margin of victory of the Democratic Party over the runner-up in the 11 shadow senator elections the District of Columbia has held, excluding the initial 1990 election that had two winners.

== See also ==
- Elections in the District of Columbia
  - United States House of Representatives elections in the District of Columbia
  - United States presidential elections in the District of Columbia
