= Dan Baer =

American politician and former diplomat

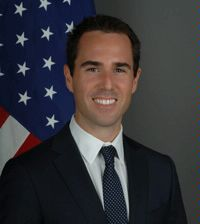

United States Ambassador to the OSCE
- In office September 10, 2013 – January 20, 2017
- President: Barack Obama
- Preceded by: Ian Kelly
- Succeeded by: Jim Gilmore

Personal details
- Born: January 6, 1977 (age 49) Denver, Colorado, U.S.
- Party: Democratic
- Spouse: Brian Walsh (m. 2014)
- Education: Harvard University (AB); Magdalen College, Oxford (MPhil, DPhil)

Daniel Brooks Baer (born January 6, 1977) is an American politician and former diplomat from Colorado currently serving as a senior vice president at the Carnegie Endowment for International Peace and director of the Europe Program. Baer served in the Obama administration's State Department, first as a Deputy Assistant Secretary of State for the Bureau of Democracy, Human Rights, and Labor from 2009 to 2013, and then as United States Ambassador to the Organization for Security and Co-operation in Europe from 2013 to 2017. In 2018, Governor John Hickenlooper appointed Baer as the executive director of the Colorado Department of Higher Education.

== Early life and education ==
Baer is a native of Colorado. He graduated from Harvard University with a BA in social studies and African American studies and was then a Marshall Scholar at Oxford University, where he earned a MPhil and DPhil in international relations.

== Consulting, academic, and diplomatic career ==
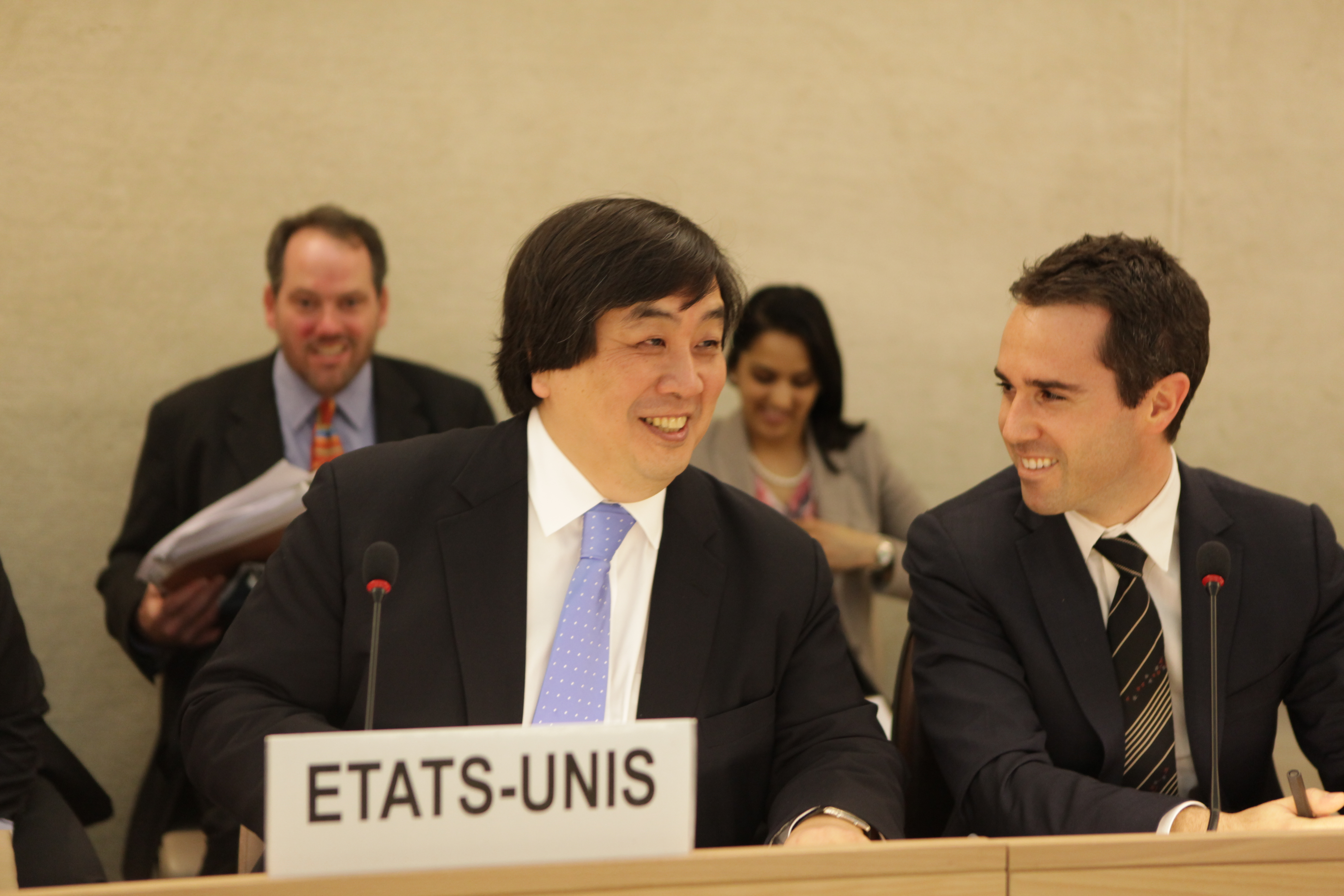
Harold Hongju Koh and Daniel Baer at the Human Rights Council.

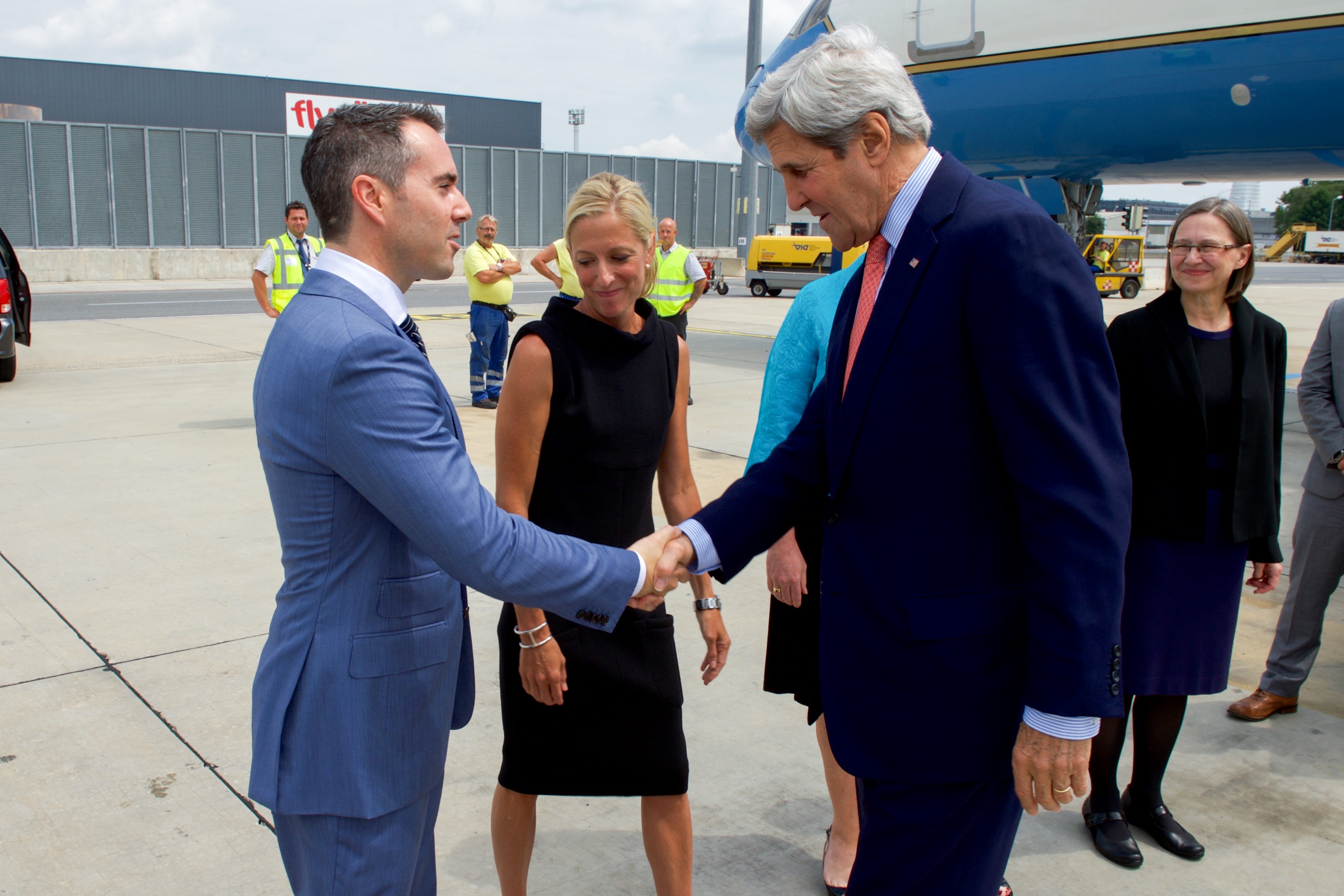
Baer with John Kerry

From 2004 to 2007, Baer worked at the Boston Consulting Group as project leader.

He was then an Assistant Professor of Strategy, Economics, Ethics, and Public Policy at the McDonough School of Business at Georgetown University. He then joined the United States Department of State, where he was Deputy Assistant Secretary of State for the Bureau of Democracy, Human Rights, and Labor from November 23, 2009 to September 10, 2013. From 2013 to 2017, Baer was the United States Ambassador for the Organization for Security and Co-operation in Europe.

== Colorado politics ==
In July 2017, Baer announced that he was running in the Democratic primary for the U.S. House seat for Colorado's 7th congressional district, held by Democrat Ed Perlmutter, who initially did not file to run for re-election in 2018. The district covers portions of Jefferson and Adams counties. Baer withdrew from the race after Perlmutter announced that he would seek reelection.

From 2017 to 2018, Baer was a diplomat-in-residence at the University of Denver's Josef Korbel School of International Affairs. In May 2018 Baer was appointed by Governor John Hickenlooper to serve as Executive Director of the Colorado Department of Higher Education.

In April 2019, Baer announced his candidacy for the Democratic nomination for the United States Senate seat held by Cory Gardner in the 2020 election. Baer entered the primary with a field of nine Democratic candidates seeking the party's nomination, running against John F. Walsh, Andrew Romanoff, Mike Johnston, Ellen Burnes, Alice Madden, and others. In September 2019, Baer dropped out of the primary and endorsed John Hickenlooper, who entered the race after ending his 2020 U.S. presidential bid.

== Personal life ==
Baer is openly gay; in August 2014, he married his longtime partner Brian Walsh.

== Publications ==
=== Articles ===
- Democracies Must Empower a Biotech Future for All, Lawfare, November 20, 2022 (co-authored with Megan Palmer, Andrew Imbrie, and Anna B. Puglisi)
- Privacy Is Power, Foreign Affairs, January 19, 2022 (co-authored with Andrew Imbrie, Anna B. Puglisi, Andrew Trask, Erik Brattberg, and Helen Toner)

== See also ==
- List of LGBT ambassadors of the United States

Diplomatic posts
Preceded by Ian Kelly	United States Ambassador to the Organization for Security and Cooperation in Europe; 2013–2017	Succeeded by Harry Kamian; Acting
