= Removal of Sam Altman from OpenAI =

2023 business action in the US

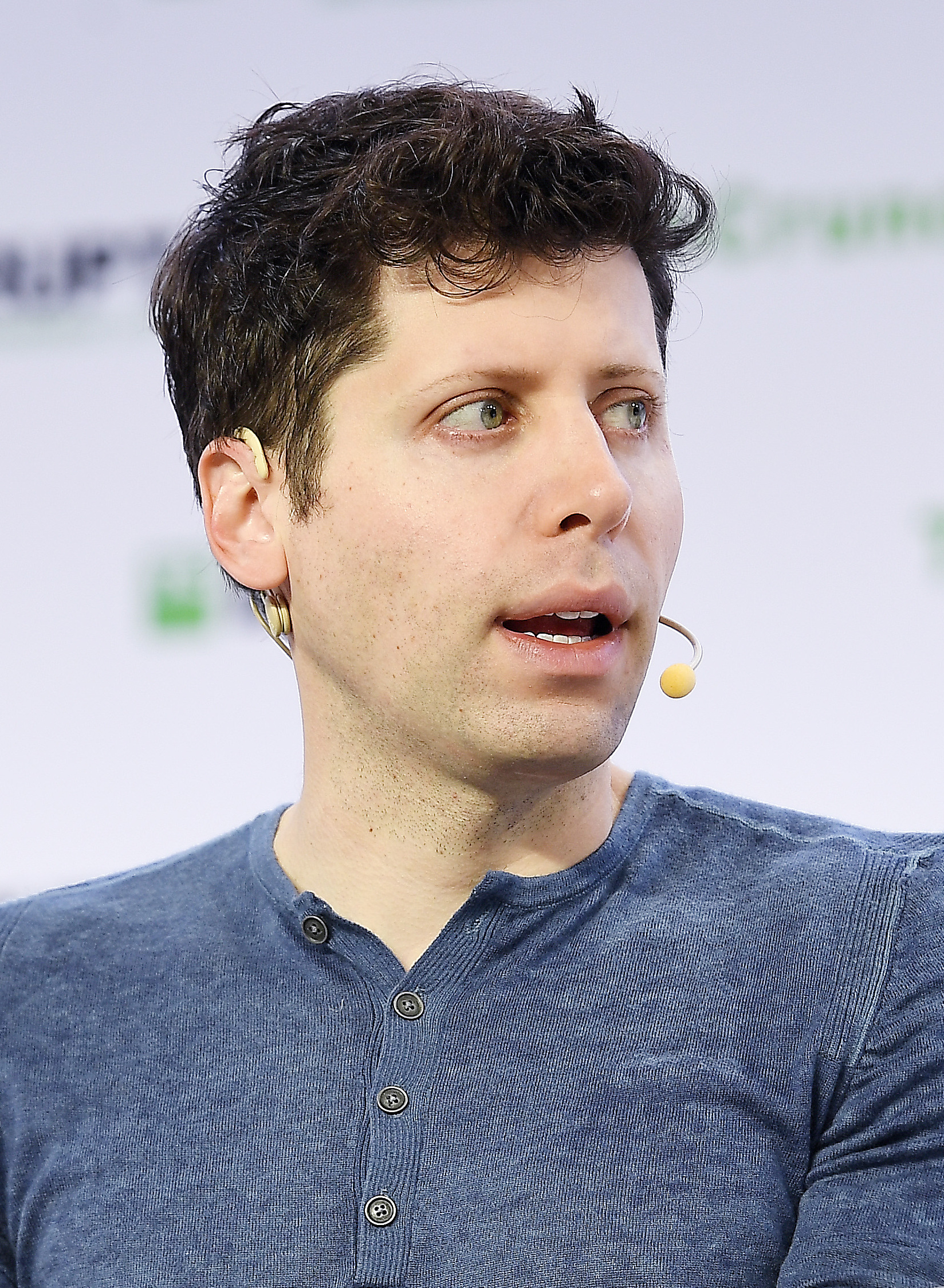
Altman in 2019

On November 17, 2023, OpenAI's board of directors ousted co-founder and chief executive Sam Altman. In an official post on the company's website, it was stated that "the board no longer has confidence in his ability to continue leading OpenAI". The removal was predicated by employee concerns, led by co-founder Ilya Sutskever and chief technology officer Mira Murati, about Altman's handling of artificial intelligence safety, commercialization, and allegations of lying and abusive behavior. Altman was reinstated on November 22 after pressure from employees and investors, with negotiations mediated by Microsoft CEO Satya Nadella.

The day of the removal, Greg Brockman and Jakub Pachocki resigned in support of Altman. The board of directors appointed Murati as interim CEO, and appointed former Twitch CEO Emmett Shear as CEO on November 19. On November 20, a letter signed by 745 of OpenAI's 770 employees threatened mass resignations if the board does not resign; Sutskever was a signatory, defecting from the board and publicly apologizing for his participation in the board's previous actions. The same day, Microsoft appointed Altman, Brockman, Pachocki, and other ex-OpenAI scientists to a new AI research team at Microsoft.

The removal and subsequent reinstatement caused widespread reactions, including impacts felt in the financial markets and technology sector. Microsoft, a partner of OpenAI, received little notice of the removal and experienced a drop in the share price of its stock. The removal also promoted interest in investigations from regulatory agencies.

== Background ==
=== OpenAI ===
OpenAI is an artificial intelligence firm founded in December 2015 as a non-profit entity. The for-profit division of the organization released ChatGPT in November 2022, contributing to a resurgence in generative artificial intelligence funding. The board of directors of the controlling non-profit formerly comprised chief scientist Ilya Sutskever, as well as Adam D'Angelo, chief executive of Quora, entrepreneur Tasha McCauley, and Helen Toner, strategy director for the Center for Security and Emerging Technology. As of October 2023, the company is valued at US$80 billion and was set to bring in US$1 billion in revenue. Altman has described OpenAI's relationship with Microsoft as the "best bromance in tech".

OpenAI is uniquely structured, an intentional decision to avoid investor control. A board of directors controls the non-profit OpenAI, Inc. The non-profit owns and controls a for-profit company itself controlling a capped-profit company, OpenAI Global, LLC and a holding company owned by employees and other investors. The holding company is the majority owner of OpenAI Global, LLC.; Microsoft owns a minority stake in the capped-profit company. OpenAI's bylaws, enacted in January 2016, allow a majority of its board of directors to remove any director without prior warning or a formal meeting with written consent.

=== Sam Altman ===
Sam Altman is a co-founder of OpenAI and its former chief executive; Altman took over the company following co-chair Elon Musk's resignation in 2018. Under Altman, OpenAI has shifted to becoming a for-profit entity. Altman is credited with convincing Microsoft chief executive Satya Nadella with investing $10 billion USD in cash and computing credits into OpenAI and leading several tender offer transactions that tripled the company's valuation. Altman testified before the United States Congress speaking critically of artificial intelligence and appeared at the 2023 AI Safety Summit.

In the days leading up to his removal, Altman made several public appearances, announcing the GPT-4 Turbo platform at OpenAI's DevDay conference, attending APEC United States 2023, and speaking at an event related to Burning Man.

== Events leading up to the removal ==
The resignation of LinkedIn co-founder Reid Hoffman, venture capitalist Shivon Zilis, and former Republican representative Will Hurd from the board allowed the remaining members to remove Altman. According to Kara Swisher and The Wall Street Journal, Sutskever was instrumental in Altman's removal. Disagreements over the safety of artificial intelligence divided employees prior to Altman's removal. The release of ChatGPT created divisions with OpenAI as a for-profit company without considerations for the safety of artificial intelligence and a non-profit cautious of artificial intelligence's capabilities; in a staff email sent in 2019 and obtained by The Atlantic, Altman referred to these divisions as "tribes".

Prior to his removal, Altman was seeking billions from Middle Eastern sovereign wealth funds to develop an artificial intelligence chip to compete with Nvidia and courted SoftBank chairman Masayoshi Son to develop artificial intelligence hardware with former Apple designer Jony Ive. Sutskever and his allies opposed these efforts, viewing them as unjustly using the OpenAI name. Altman reduced Sutskever's role in October 2023, furthering divisions; Sutskever successfully appealed to several members of the board. Swisher and The Verge reporter Alex Heath stated that opposition to Altman's profit-driven strategy culminated in the DevDay conference in which Altman announced custom ChatGPT instances. According to Axios, the removal was driven by growing discontent and distrust with Altman.

On November 22, 2023, reports emerged suggesting that Sam Altman's dismissal from OpenAI might be linked to his alleged mishandling of a significant breakthrough in the organization's secretive project codenamed Q*. According to sources within OpenAI, Q* is aimed at developing AI capabilities in logical and mathematical reasoning, and reportedly involves performing math on the level of grade-school students. Concerns about Altman's response to this development, specifically regarding the potential safety implications of the discovery, were reportedly raised to the company's board shortly before his firing.

A report from The Washington Post in December stated that OpenAI's board of directors were concerned over Altman's allegedly abusive behavior; the complaints were purportedly a major factor in his removal. The Post previously reported that Altman's alleged pattern of deception and subversiveness that ostensibly resulted in his removal from Y Combinator ultimately resulted in the board's decision to remove him. In April 2026, an investigative report from The New Yorker found that Sutskever and others, in response to the board's request, had compiled an approximately 70-page-long annotated dossier consisting of internal communications, documents, and photos. The dossier claimed that Altman "exhibits a consistent pattern of [...] Lying", and that Altman misrepresented information to the company's senior management and board, particularly regarding safety issues.

== Removal ==
Avatar of Sam Altman

Sam Altman
(@sama)
tweeted:

i loved my time at openai. it was transformative for me personally, and hopefully the world a little bit.

November 17, 2023

On November 17, 2023, at approximately noon PST, OpenAI's board of directors ousted Altman effective immediately following a "deliberative review process". The board concluded that Altman was not "consistently candid in his communications". Altman was informed of his removal five to ten minutes before it occurred on a Google Meet while watching the Las Vegas Grand Prix. Within thirty minutes, Sutskever invited OpenAI chairman and president Greg Brockman to a Google Meet to inform him of Altman's removal. According to an internal memo obtained by Axios, the removal was not due to "malfeasance", and OpenAI chief executive Emmett Shear denied accusations that the removal was due to disagreements. The board publicly announced Altman's removal thirty minutes later.

Chief Technology Officer Mira Murati was immediately appointed to interim chief executive officer. Hours after Altman's removal, Brockman resigned as chairman, joined by director of research Jakub Pachocki and researchers Aleksander Mądry and Szymon Sidor. During an all-hands meeting, Sutskever defended the ouster and denied accusations of a hostile takeover. An OpenAI representative requested former board member Will Hurd's presence.

== Reinstatement ==
According to The New Yorker, Altman retreated to his San Francisco home and enlisted the help of communications consultant Chris Lehane and Airbnb chief executive Brian Chesky, as well as former staff and a legal team, to plan his reinstatement. Lehane encouraged Altman to engage on social media, while Chesky sent a journalist negative information about the board. Altman told interim CEO Murati that his team was conducting opposition research on her and the individuals responsible for his removal; Altman later stated he did not remember saying this. Altman insisted multiple times that all board members who supported his removal should resign.

Tiger Global Management and Sequoia Capital had attempted to reinstate Altman, according to The Information; Bloomberg News reported that Microsoft and Thrive Capital were seeking Altman's reinstatement. On November 18, The Verge reported that OpenAI's board of directors discussed reinstating Altman. The board agreed in principle to resign and to allow Altman to return, but missed the deadline. According to The Verge, Altman was ambivalent about returning and would seek significant changes to the company, including replacing the board. A list of directors had been prepared by investors in the event that the board steps down, and purportedly included former Salesforce executive Bret Taylor. According to chief strategy officer Jason Kwon, OpenAI was optimistic it could return Altman, Brockman, and other employees.

On November 19, Altman and Brockman appeared at OpenAI's headquarters to negotiate, mediated by Nadella. According to Bloomberg News, Murati, Kwon, and chief operating officer Brad Lightcap were pushing for a new board of directors; it was required that the board absolve him of wrongdoing in order for Altman to be reinstated. Taylor was expected be a member of the new board and Microsoft had also attempted to gain a seat. The Wall Street Journal reported that Chesky and businesswoman Laurene Powell Jobs were also considered. Murati had intended to rehire Altman and Brockman, discussing the move with Adam D'Angelo. The Verge reported that Altman intended to return to OpenAI with support from Sutskever.

The board chose to name former Twitch chief executive Emmett Shear as OpenAI's chief executive instead of reinstating Altman. Former GitHub chief executive Nat Friedman and Scale AI chief executive Alex Wang reportedly rejected executive offers from the board. Anthropic chief executive Dario Amodei refused to negotiate a deal that could have led to a merge of the two companies. In response, Microsoft appointed Altman as the chief executive of an artificial intelligence research team, joined by Brockman, Pachocki, Sidor, and Mądry. Shear expressed interest in commercializing OpenAI with the board's support and stated his intentions to begin an investigation into Altman's removal.

Dozens of employees announced their resignations in response to Shear's accession. The next day, a letter signed by 745 of OpenAI's 770 employees threatened mass resignations if the board does not resign; among the signatories was board member Sutskever, who defected from the board and publicly apologized for his participation in the board's previous actions. On November 21, The Verge reported that Altman was reinstated with Taylor, D'Angelo, and economist Lawrence Summers on an interim board. Taylor will chair the board. As part of the compromise deal, Altman and Brockman will not reclaim seats on the board. Altman agreed to an internal investigation into his alleged conduct, selecting two lawyers from WilmerHale to conduct the inquiry.

In March 2024, the investigation determined that Altman's behavior "did not mandate removal". Taylor announced that Altman would rejoin OpenAI's board of directors with former Bill and Melinda Gates Foundation chief executive Sue Desmond-Hellmann, former Sony Corporation general counsel Nicole Seligman, and Instacart chief executive Fidji Simo. The New Yorker stated that no written report was released for the investigation, contrary to the expectations of many employees and executives. Altman later recalled that the new board members received oral briefings regarding the details of the investigation; his claim was disputed by an involved party.

In May 2024, after OpenAI's non-disparagement agreements were exposed, Altman was accused of lying when claiming to have been unaware of the equity cancellation provision for departing employees that don't sign the agreement. Also in May, former board member Helen Toner explained the board's rationale for firing Altman in November 2023. She stated that Altman had withheld information, for example about the release of ChatGPT and his ownership of OpenAI's startup fund. She said that Altman provided "inaccurate information about the small number of formal safety processes that the company did have in place". She also alleged that two executives in OpenAI had reported to the board "psychological abuse" from Altman, and provided screenshots and documentation of "lying and being manipulative in different situations". She said that many employees feared retaliation if they didn't support Altman, and that he had already been fired from Loopt because of what the management team had called "deceptive and chaotic behavior".

== Aftermath ==
=== OpenAI ===
The removal left OpenAI in "chaos", according to The New York Times. According to Bloomberg News, a significant number of OpenAI engineers threatened to resign if the board did not reconsider Altman's removal.

According to The Information, Altman's removal risked a share sale led by Thrive Capital valuing the company at US$86 billion. A potential second tender offer for early-stage investors was also at risk. The Information later reported that Thrive Capital's tender offer will continue after Altman's reinstatement.

OpenAI delayed the release of its online chatbot store as a result of Altman's removal.

=== Market effects ===
Shares in Microsoft fell nearly three percent following the announcement. According to CoinDesk, the value of Worldcoin, an iris biometric cryptocurrency co-founded by Altman, decreased twelve percent. After hiring Altman, Microsoft's stock price rose over two percent to an all-time high.

Altman's removal benefited OpenAI's competitors, such as Anthropic, Quora, Hugging Face, Meta Platforms, and Google. The Economist wrote that the removal could slow down the artificial intelligence industry as a whole. Google DeepMind received an increase in applicants, according to The Information; Cohere and Adept engaged in an active effort to hire OpenAI employees. Several investors considered writing down their OpenAI investments to zero, impacting the company's ability to raise capital. Over one hundred companies using OpenAI contacted Anthropic, according to The Information; others reached out to Google Cloud, Cohere, and Microsoft Azure.

=== Potential venture ===
According to The Information, Altman was planning a new artificial intelligence venture with Brockman, among other OpenAI employees. Sequoia Capital investor Alfred Lin and venture capitalist Vinod Khosla expressed interest in Altman's potential venture.

=== Legal action ===
Multiple OpenAI investors are considering legal action. On December 8, the Competition and Markets Authority announced it was beginning a preliminary investigation into Microsoft's relationship with OpenAI and its non-voting board observership. Hours later, Bloomberg News reported that the Federal Trade Commission was separately examining the relationship. In response, Microsoft stated that it does not hold a stake in OpenAI.

In February 2024, the U.S. Securities and Exchange Commission was reportedly investigating OpenAI over whether internal company communications made by Altman were used to mislead investors, while an investigation of Altman's statements that was opened by the Southern New York U.S. Attorney's Office opened the previous November was ongoing.

== Reactions ==
=== Sam Altman ===
Altman quipped that the OpenAI board of directors should sue him should he "start going off". Former co-chair Elon Musk stated that the board should be transparent in its removal. At the 2023 DealBook Summit, Musk called the turmoil "troubling" and that he had "mixed feelings" towards Altman. Allies of Altman accused board members of staging a coup and several OpenAI employees responded to a tweet Altman wrote with a heart emoji, intended to demonstrate employees who are prepared to leave. Former Google chief executive Eric Schmidt wrote that Altman was a "hero to [him]" after his removal.

=== Technology industry ===
Microsoft executives were informed of Altman's removal a minute before the announcement was made, according to Axios, and investors were not given advance knowledge. Satya Nadella and chief technology officer Kevin Scott expressed confidence in OpenAI following his removal, though Nadella was reportedly furious, according to Bloomberg News.

Y Combinator co-founder Paul Graham referred to the board's members as "misbehaving children". Third Point chief executive and Microsoft shareholder Daniel S. Loeb stated that OpenAI had "stunningly poor governance". French digital transition minister Jean-Noël Barrot stated that Altman is "welcome in France".

Following the employee letter, Salesforce chief executive Marc Benioff offered to employ OpenAI employees with matching salaries, an offer extended by Microsoft.

=== Media analysis ===
Wired editor-at-large Steven Levy compared the removal of Altman to the removal of Steve Jobs from Apple in 1985, a comparison made by The New York Times. Axios posed that the board could resign, returning OpenAI to Altman. Writing for The New York Times, Ezra Klein noted the role of OpenAI's controlling non-profit in self-regulation. Analyst Fred Havemeyer stated that Nadella "pulled off a coup of his own" in hiring Altman in The Washington Post. Altman was named as Time's CEO of the Year for 2023, owing partially to his removal.

=== Other ===
In October 2024, Nobel Prize winner Geoffrey Hinton declared that he was proud that Ilya Sutskever, a former student of his, was responsible for firing Altman. The events surrounding the firing are the subject of the 2026 film Artificial, with Andrew Garfield playing Altman and Yura Borisov playing Sutskever.

== See also ==
- Artificial intelligence controversies
