= Anna B. Puglisi =

American security analyst

- Education: Indiana University Bloomington (BS, MS, MPA)
- Occupations: Security analyst, former senior U.S. intelligence official
- Employer: Hoover Institution
- Awards: FBI Director’s Award for Excellence

Anna B. Puglisi is an American security analyst who currently serves as a visiting fellow at the Hoover Institution. She previously was biotechnology program director and a senior fellow at Georgetown University's Center for Security and Emerging Technology (CSET). She is also a member of the Center for a New American Security's BioTech Task Force. She was the U.S. National Counterintelligence Officer for East Asia between 2019 and 2020 in the National Counterintelligence and Security Center.

== Education ==
Puglisi holds a BA in biology, a MS in environmental science, and a MPA from Indiana University Bloomington. She also studied Chinese through the Princeton in Beijing Summer Program.

== Career ==
Prior to joining CSET, where she established its biotechnology program, Puglisi served for over a decade in the U.S. intelligence community as a member of the Senior Analytic Service focusing on China's technology acquisition and U.S. mitigation strategies. She received various awards including the FBI Director's Award for Excellence. She is currently a visiting fellow at the Hoover Institution.

== Views on U.S.-China relations ==
In a February 2024 interview with The Boston Globe, Puglisi said of China's challenge to U.S. policymaking: "At its core, it's the challenge of a Chinese system that really blurs public and private, government and military, and creates an unfair playing field for US companies."

In a September 2024 testimony before the United States House Select Committee on Strategic Competition between the United States and the Chinese Communist Party, Puglisi stated that she received legal threats from BGI Group for a report she wrote while serving at CSET.

== Publications ==
=== Books ===
- Chinese Industrial Espionage Technology Acquisition and Military Modernisation, Routledge & CRC Press, 2013 (co-authored with William C. Hannas and James Mulvenon)

=== Contributed Volumes ===
- Chapter 5. The myth of the stateless global society, Chapter 12. The Impact of China's policies, and Chapter 16. Chinese students, scholarship and US innovation, in China's Quest for Foreign Technology: Beyond Espionage (Routledge, 2021; edited By William C. Hannas and Didi Kirsten Tatlow)

=== Reports ===
- China's State Key Laboratory System, Georgetown CSET, June 2022 (co-authored with Emily Weinstein, Ryan Fedasiuk, and Channing Lee)
- China's Industrial Clusters, Georgetown CSET, June 2022 (co-authored with Daniel Chou)
- A Competitive Era for China's Universities, Georgetown CSET, March 2022 (co-authored with Ryan Fedasiuk and Alan Omar Loera Martinez)

=== Articles ===
- Democracies Must Empower a Biotech Future for All, Lawfare, November 20, 2022 (co-authored with Megan Palmer, Andrew Imbrie, and Daniel Baer)
- Privacy Is Power, Foreign Affairs, January 19, 2022 (co-authored with Andrew Imbrie, Daniel Baer, Andrew Trask, Erik Brattberg, and Helen Toner)

=== Testimonies ===
- Anna Puglisi's Testimony Before the U.S.-China Economic and Security Review Commission, February 24, 2023
- Anna Puglisi's Testimony Before the Senate Select Committee on Intelligence, August 4, 2021
