= United States Mission to the Organization for Security and Cooperation in Europe =

United States diplomatic mission

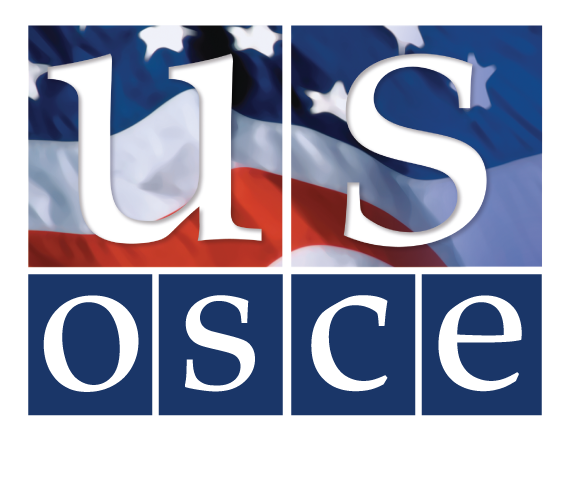
- Logo
- Location: Vienna, Austria

Government
  - Ambassador: Darrell Owens
  - Deputy Chief of Mission: Kate Rebholz
- Website osce.usmission.gov

The United States Mission to the Organization for Security and Cooperation in Europe represents the United States government in the Organization for Security and Cooperation in Europe (OSCE). Currently, Katherine Brucker represents the United States at the OSCE and holds the title of chargé d'affaires ad interim.

The United States Mission to the OSCE is composed of representatives of the Department of State, the Joint Chiefs of Staff of the Defense Department, and of the joint Congressional/Executive Branch Commission on Security and Cooperation in Europe, also known as the U.S. Helsinki Commission. The Mission was established in 1975, shortly after the OSCE was created by the Helsinki Accords.

The Mission represents the United States in the Permanent Council of the OSCE, the Organization's principal policy-making body, as well as in the Forum for Security Cooperation (FSC). The Mission also monitors implementation of the Treaty on Conventional Armed Forces in Europe (CFE) Treaty in the Joint Consultative Group (JCG), and represents the U.S. in the Open Skies Consultative Commission (OSCC).

The Mission's goals are:

- Enhancing political and military security across the OSCE region, including prevention of a gradual re-militarization of Euro-Atlantic security.
- Implementing and verifying compliance with arms control agreements.
- Strengthening the OSCE’s conflict prevention and resolution capabilities.
- Promoting implementation of OSCE commitments in all three dimensions: the politico-military dimension, the economic and environmental dimension, the human dimension.
- Supporting democracy, rule of law and respect for human rights and fundamental freedoms.
- Combating new threats to security such as terrorism, intolerance, and trafficking of persons.
- Directing greater attention and resources to Central Asia through programs promoting democratic institutions and practices, improving border security, expanding existing police assistance programs, and encouraging economic and free market development so that peace, security, just governance and democracy may be achieved.
- Preserving the OSCE’s effectiveness.

== Chiefs of the U.S. Mission to the OSCE ==
List of chiefs of the U.S. Mission to the OSCE:

- Sam W. Brown Jr. (1994 – 1997), Head of the U.S. Delegation to the CSCE and the OSCE
- David T. Johnson (1998 – 2001)
- Stephan M. Minikes (2001 – July 2005)
- Julie Finley (August 18, 2005 – January 20, 2009)
- Ian C. Kelly (April 2010 – August 2013)
- Daniel B. Baer (September 2013 – January 20, 2017)
- James S. Gilmore III (July 2, 2019 – January 20, 2021)
- Michael R. Carpenter (November 29, 2021 – April 4, 2024)
- Darrell Owens (July 3, 2026 – Present)
