= Robin Dunnigan =

American diplomat

Robin L. Dunnigan
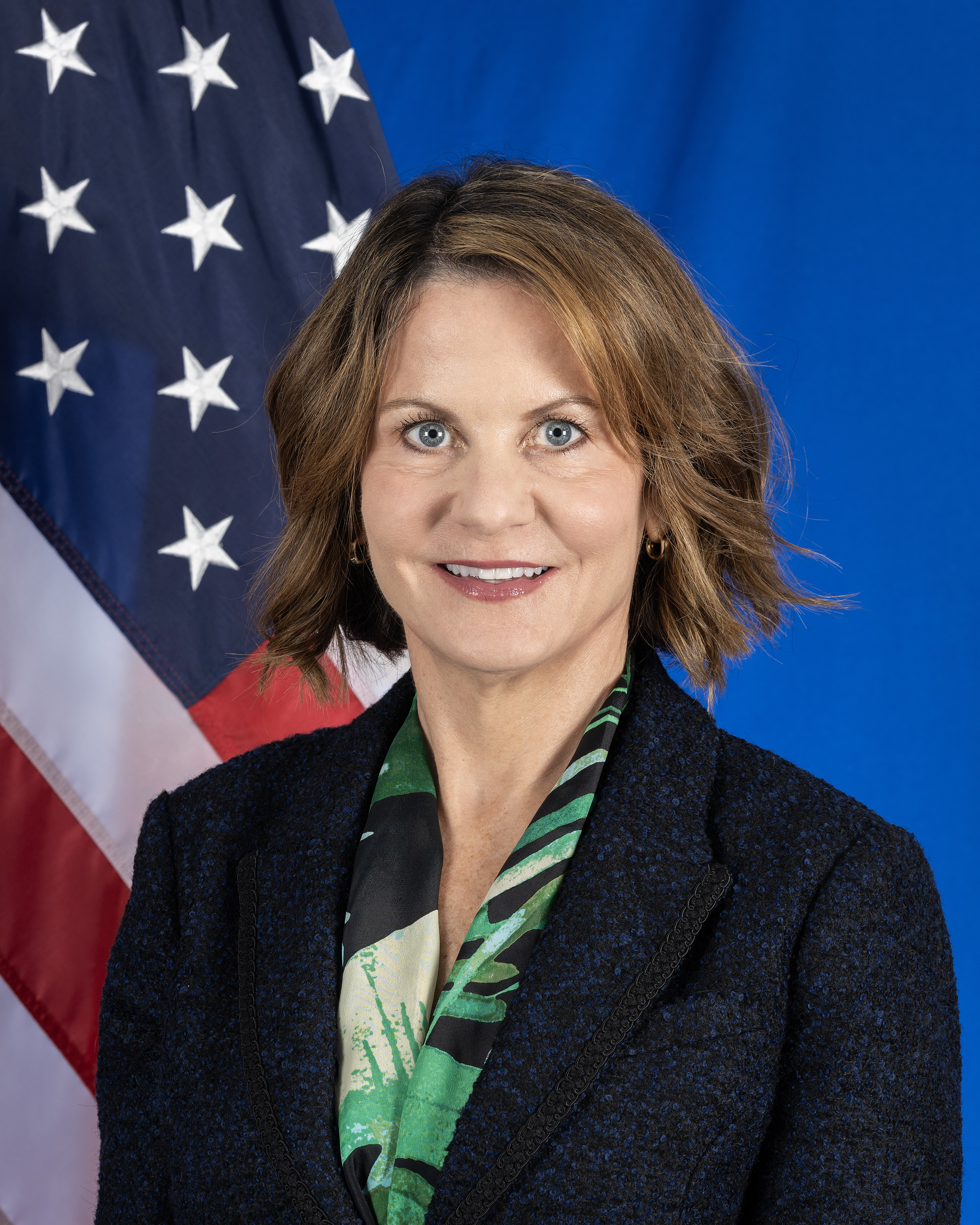

United States Ambassador to Georgia
- In office October 12, 2023 – July 15, 2025
- President: Joe Biden; Donald Trump
- Preceded by: Kelly C. Degnan
- Succeeded by: Alan S. Purcell (Chargé d'affaires ad interim)

Personal details
- Education: University of California-Berkeley (BA); National War College, Georgetown University (MS)

Robin L. Dunnigan is an American diplomat who had served as the United States ambassador to Georgia.

== Early life and education ==
Dunnigan earned a Master of Science degree with distinction from the National War College. She also received a Master of Science from Georgetown University as well as a Bachelor of Science from the University of California at Berkeley.

== Career ==
Dunnigan is a career member of the Senior Foreign Service, with the rank of Minister-Counselor. She currently serves as Deputy Assistant Secretary of State for Central and Eastern Europe in the Bureau of European and Eurasian Affairs. Before this, she served as Chargé d'Affaires, ad interim, and Deputy Chief of Mission of the U.S. Embassy in Vienna, Austria. Dunnigan also served as the Deputy Assistant Secretary in the Bureau of Energy Resources. Dunnigan has worked in a number of countries, including Vietnam, Chile, Turkey, Cuba, and El Salvador. Domestically, Dunnigan served as Director for the Office of Europe, the Western Hemisphere, and Africa within the State Department's Energy Bureau, as well as various roles in the Bureau of Near Eastern Affairs and on the staff of the Secretary of State in the Executive Secretariat.

=== U.S. ambassador to Georgia ===
On February 13, 2023, President Joe Biden nominated Dunnigan to be the ambassador to Georgia. Hearings on her nomination were held before the Senate Foreign Relations Committee on March 30, 2023. Her nomination was favorably reported by the committee on April 27, 2023. She was confirmed by the full United States Senate on July 27, 2023, via voice vote. She presented her credentials to Georgian President Salome Zourabichvili on October 12, 2023.

== Awards and recognitions ==
Dunnigan has won numerous State Department performance awards, including two Senior Foreign Service Performance Awards.

== Personal life ==
Dunnigan is a native of California. She speaks Spanish and German, as well as some Turkish and Vietnamese.
