= Kelly C. Degnan =

American diplomat

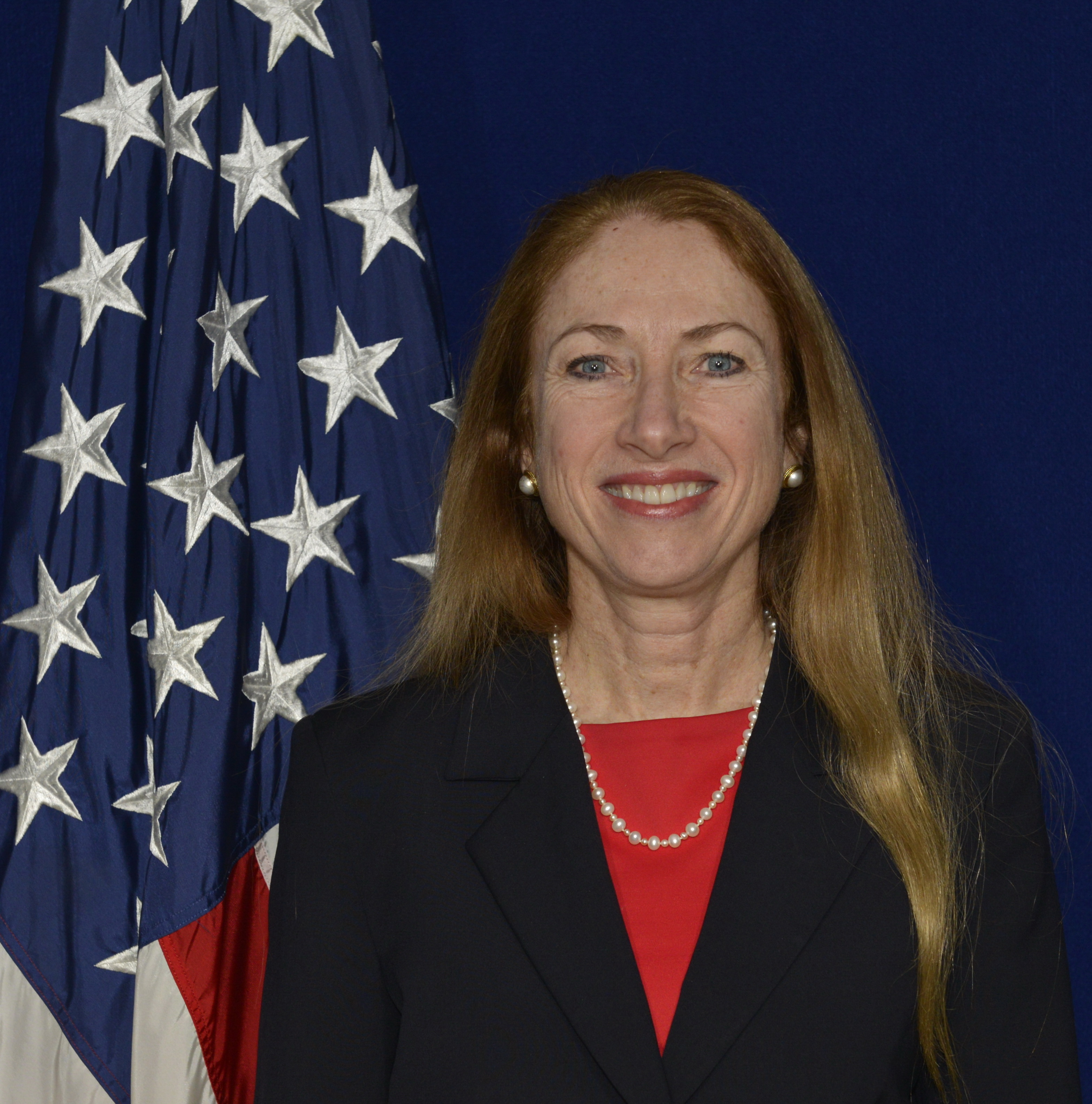

United States Ambassador to Georgia
- In office January 31, 2020 – August 29, 2023
- President: Donald Trump; Joe Biden
- Preceded by: Ian Kelly
- Succeeded by: Robin Dunnigan

United States Ambassador to Italy
- Acting
- In office January 18, 2017 – October 1, 2017
- Appointed by: Donald Trump
- Preceded by: John R. Phillips
- Succeeded by: Lewis Eisenberg

United States Ambassador to San Marino
- Acting
- In office January 18, 2017 – October 1, 2017
- Appointed by: Donald Trump
- Preceded by: John R. Phillips
- Succeeded by: Lewis Eisenberg

Personal details
- Education: Northwestern University (BS); University of Southern California (JD)

Kelly Colleen Degnan is a career member of the Senior Foreign Service, class of Minister-Counselor, who served as the United States Ambassador to Georgia from 2020 to 2023. Prior to that she served as the Political Advisor to the Commander of United States Naval Forces Europe / United States Naval Forces Africa. Previously, she was the Deputy Chief of Mission (DCM) to the U.S. Mission to Italy and San Marino in Rome, Italy. In September 2019, she was nominated to be the next U.S. Ambassador to Georgia.

== Education ==
Degnan graduated from the University of Southern California Law Center and practiced law in California for several years. She sailed the Pacific Ocean for five years, working as legal counsel in the Federated States of Micronesia and the Republic of Palau before joining the State Department. She holds an undergraduate degree in journalism from Northwestern University's Medill School of Journalism.

== Career ==
Following the departure of Ambassador John R. Phillips, Degnan became Chargé d'Affaires ad interim (the acting U.S. Ambassador) to the U.S. Mission to Italy and San Marino from January 18, 2017, until October 1, 2017, when Ambassador Lewis Eisenberg arrived. She was the Deputy Chief of Mission (DCM) prior to that point, starting in November 2015, and continued to serve as DCM until July 2019. Prior to the assignment in Rome, she served on the Secretary of State's staff as Deputy Executive Secretary from February 2014 to September 2015. Prior to returning to Washington, Degnan served as Deputy Chief of Mission at U.S. Embassy Pristina in Kosovo. She moved to Embassy Kosovo from the U.S. Mission to NATO in Brussels, where she was the Political Advisor for three years.

In addition, Degnan has served overseas as the Senior Civilian Representative to Brigade Combat Team Salerno in Khost Afghanistan, as Deputy Political Counselor at the United States Embassy in Ankara Turkey, as well as in Botswana, and Pakistan since joining the United States Foreign Service in 1993. She also served as Special Assistant to the Secretary of State and Special Assistant to the Undersecretary of State for Political Affairs during her previous tours in Washington. Ms. Degnan earned the Secretary of State's Expeditionary Service Award, as well as numerous other awards.

=== Ambassador to Georgia ===
In her first public speech during the appointment ceremony, Degnan called Russia a hostile neighbor to Georgia, and outlined that her mission would be dedicated to deepening relations between Washington and Tbilisi in the development of democracy, trade and security.

Ambassador Degnan outlined Georgia's impressive progress in the fight against corruption, in matters of doing business and highlighted that 2020 Georgian parliamentary election would play a very important role in the development of Georgia.

In her speech, Kelly Degnan repeatedly called Georgia an important strategic partner of the United States and highlighted the participation of Georgian units in operations in Afghanistan.

==== Swearing-in ceremony ====
Ambassador Degnan's swearing-in ceremony on January 18, 2020, was in the Treaty Room on the Seventh Floor of the U.S. State Department in Washington, DC, and was attended by a number of dignitaries, including the Georgian Ambassador to the United States, Ambassador David Bakradze.

==== Presentation of credentials ====
Degnan presented her credentials to Georgian President Salome Zourabichvili at the Orbeliani Palace in Tbilisi on January 31, 2020.

=== Political Advisor to the Chairman of the Joint Chiefs of Staff at the Pentagon ===
In September 2023, Kelly C. Degnan became the Political Advisor to the Chairman of the Joint Chiefs of Staff at the Pentagon, the nation's highest-ranking military officer, and the principal military advisor to the President, Secretary of Defense, and National Security Council. Kelly overlapped briefly with Army General Mark Milley (ret.) and is now working closely with Air Force General Charles Q. Brown, Jr.

== Personal life ==
Degnan speaks Italian, French, Turkish, Urdu, and Georgian.

Diplomatic posts
Preceded by John Phillips	United States Ambassador to Italy; 2017; Acting	Succeeded by Lewis Eisenberg
Preceded by John Phillips	United States Ambassador to San Marino; 2017; Acting	Succeeded by Lewis Eisenberg
Preceded by Ian C. Kelly	United States Ambassador to Georgia; 2020–2023	Succeeded by Robin Dunnigan
