= List of ambassadors of the United States to Georgia =

Ambassador of the United States to Georgia
- Seal of the United States Department of State

- Flag of a United States ambassador

- Incumbent; Courtney Austrian; Chargé d'affaires since September 8, 2026
- Nominator: The president of the United States
- Appointer: The president; with Senate advice and consent
- Inaugural holder: Carey Cavanaugh as Chargé d'Affaires ad interim
- Formation: April 23, 1992
- Website: U.S. Embassy - Tbilisi

This is a list of ambassadors of the United States to Georgia.

The United States recognized Georgia's independence on December 25, 1991, and established diplomatic relations March 29, 1993.

The U.S. Embassy in Tbilisi was established April 23, 1992, with Carey Cavanaugh as Chargé d'Affaires ad interim.

Representative	From	To	Title	Appointed by
Kent N. Brown	September 9, 1992	August 19, 1995	Ambassador Extraordinary and Plenipotentiary	Bill Clinton
William H. Courtney	September 22, 1995	August 3, 1997	Ambassador Extraordinary and Plenipotentiary	Bill Clinton
Kenneth Spencer Yalowitz	July 11, 1998	June 21, 2001	Ambassador Extraordinary and Plenipotentiary	Bill Clinton
Richard Monroe Miles	May 13, 2002	August 12, 2005	Ambassador Extraordinary and Plenipotentiary	George W. Bush
John F. Tefft	August 23, 2005	September 9, 2009	Ambassador Extraordinary and Plenipotentiary	George W. Bush
John R. Bass	October 16, 2009	July 12, 2012	Ambassador Extraordinary and Plenipotentiary	Barack Obama
Richard Norland	September 10, 2012	July 18, 2015	Ambassador Extraordinary and Plenipotentiary	Barack Obama
Ian C. Kelly	September 17, 2015	March 24, 2018	Ambassador Extraordinary and Plenipotentiary	Barack Obama; Donald Trump
Kelly C. Degnan	January 31, 2020	August 29, 2023	Ambassador Extraordinary and Plenipotentiary	Donald Trump; Joe Biden
Robin Dunnigan	October 12, 2023	July 15, 2025	Ambassador Extraordinary and Plenipotentiary	Joe Biden
Alan S. Purcell	July 16, 2025	July 29, 2026	Chargé d'affaires ad interim	Donald Trump
Amy W. Diaz	July 30, 2026	September 8, 2026	Chargé d'affaires ad interim	Donald Trump
Courtney Austrian	September 8, 2026	Present	Chargé d'affaires ad interim	Donald Trump

== See also ==
- Georgia–United States relations
- Foreign relations of Georgia (country)
- Ambassadors of the United States
