= Florence Pendleton =

American politician (1926–2020)

- Pendleton in 1993

United States Shadow Senator from the District of Columbia
- In office January 3, 1991 – January 3, 2007
- Preceded by: Seat established
- Succeeded by: Michael Brown

Personal details
- Born: Florence Howard; January 28, 1926 Columbus, Georgia, U.S.
- Died: September 10, 2020 (aged 94) Columbus, Georgia, U.S.
- Party: Democratic
- Education: Howard University (BS, MS); Virginia Polytechnic Institute and State University (attended)

Florence Howard Pendleton (January 28, 1926 – September 10, 2020) was an American political activist who served as a shadow senator from the District of Columbia from 1991 to 2007.

Pendleton's main goal as shadow senator was to promote the efforts of the District of Columbia to gain full voting rights. She was inaugurated as the first ever shadow senator from the District of Columbia on January 3, 1991. She was known as “The Education Senator” because of her legacy as a life-long educator, administrator of DC Public Schools, and founder of the nonprofit “STAND”, The Society for Teaching Americans about New Columbia and DC Statehood.

Pendleton defended her seat in 2000, cruising to victory in the general election over Janet Helms, beating her 84%–14%. Her re-election bid in 2006 failed when Philip Pannell successfully challenged that she failed to have 2,000 valid signatures to get onto the ballot, having only 1,559. She ran as a write-in candidate, but only won 1,363 votes as Michael Donald Brown cruised to victory with 62,415 votes over her and Pannell's 21,552 votes to win the Democratic Primary. Her last day in office was on January 3, 2007. She was an active member of the Berarean Baptist Church.

== Background ==
Pendleton graduated from Howard University with a Bachelor of Science degree and a Master of Science and she was a doctoral student at Virginia Tech.

== Election history ==
=== 1990 ===
1990 Shadow Senator election in Washington, D.C.
Party	Candidate	Votes	%
Democratic	Jesse Jackson	85,454	57.03
Democratic	Florence Pendleton	25,349	16.92
Democratic	Harry "Tommy" Thomas, Jr.	22,401	14.95
Democratic	James Forman	9,899	6.61
Democratic	Marc Humphries	6,739	4.50
Total votes		149,842	100.00
General election
Democratic	Jesse Jackson	105,633	46.80
Democratic	Florence Pendleton	58,451	25.89
independent (politician)	Harry T. Alexander	13,983	6.19
Republican	Milton Francis	13,538	6.00
Republican	Joan Gillison	12,845	5.69
DC Statehood Green	Keith M. Wilkerson	4,545	2.01
DC Statehood Green	Anthony W. Peacock	4,285	1.90
independent (politician)	John West	3,621	1.60
independent (politician)	David L. Whitehead	3,341	1.48
Socialist Workers	Sam Manuel	2,765	1.23
independent (politician)	Lee Black	2,728	1.21
Total votes		215,735	100.00
Democratic win (new seat)			

In the general election, the top two vote getters were elected as Shadow senators of each seat, with Pendleton taking Seat 1 and Jackson taking Seat 2.

=== 1994 ===
1994 U.S. Shadow Senator election in Washington, D.C.
Primary election
Party	Candidate	Votes	%
Democratic	Florence Pendleton (incumbent)	78,576	76.83
Democratic	Stephen Sellows	20,512	20.06
Write-in		3,180	3.11
Total votes		102,268	100.00
General election
Democratic	Florence Pendleton (incumbent)	117,517	74.04
Republican	Julie Finley	24,107	15.19
DC Statehood Green	Mel Edwards	15,586	9.82
Write-in		1,511	0.95
Total votes		158,721	100.00
Democratic hold			

=== 2000 ===
2000 U.S. Shadow Senator election in Washington, D.C.
Primary election
Party	Candidate	Votes	%
Democratic	Florence Pendleton (incumbent)	28,500	96.48
Write-in		1,041	3.52
Total votes		29,541	100.00
General election
Democratic	Florence Pendleton (incumbent)	143,578	88.97
Republican	Janet Helms (withdrew)	16,666	10.33
Write-in		1,136	0.71
Total votes		161,380	100.00
Democratic hold			

=== 2006 ===
2006 U.S. Shadow Senator Washington, D.C. Democratic Party primary election
Party	Candidate	Votes	%
Democratic	Michael Donald Brown	62,415	73.15
Democratic	Philip Pannell	21,552	25.26
Write-in		1,363	1.60
Total votes		85,330	100.00

Pendleton got kicked off the Democratic primary ballot for not getting enough valid signatures to qualify for the election. She ran as a write-in candidate with little success.

== Political career ==
- November 6, 1990 — elected shadow senator when office was created
- November 8, 1994 — reelected shadow senator
- November 7, 2000 — reelected shadow senator
- 2006 — filed to run for reelection but was knocked off the primary ballot when her opponent Phil Pannell challenged the signatures on her petition

== See also ==
- District of Columbia's at-large congressional district

Party political offices
New seat	Democratic nominee for U.S. Shadow Senator from the District of Columbia (Class 1); 1990, 1994, 2000	Succeeded by Michael Brown
U.S. Senate
New seat	U.S. Shadow Senator (Class 1) from the District of Columbia; 1991–2007; Served alongside: Jesse Jackson, Paul Strauss	Succeeded by Michael Brown
