= Michael R. Carpenter =

American diplomat

Michael Carpenter
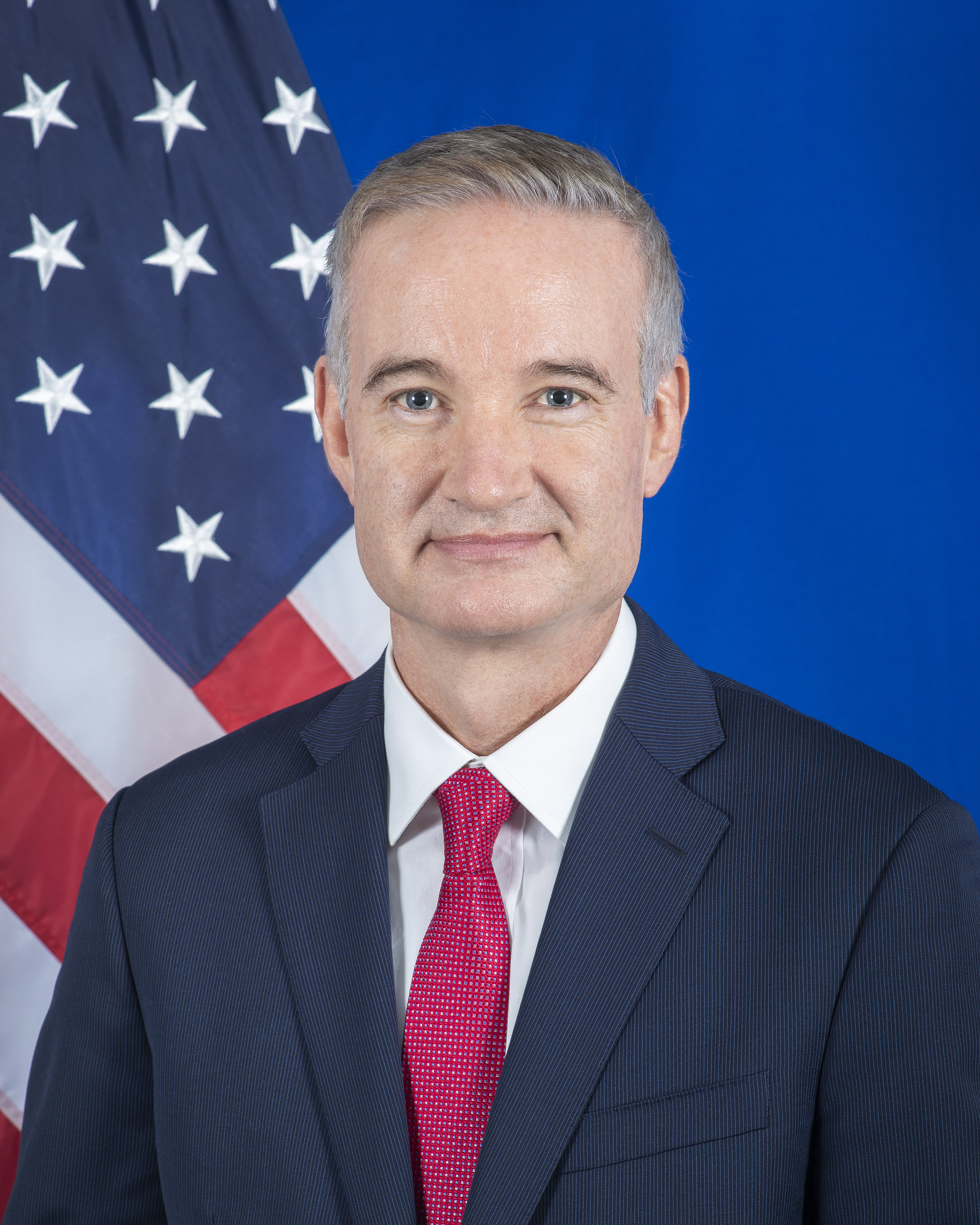

United States Ambassador to the Organization for Security and Cooperation in Europe
- In office November 29, 2021 – April 4, 2024
- President: Joe Biden
- Preceded by: Jim Gilmore
- Succeeded by: Darrell Owens

Personal details
- Education: Stanford University (BA); University of California, Berkeley (MA, PhD)

Michael Randell Carpenter is an American diplomat who served as Senior Director for Europe at the National Security Council. Previously he served as United States ambassador to the Organization for Security and Cooperation in Europe in the Biden administration.

== Education ==
Carpenter holds a BA in international relations from Stanford University, a BA in International law from Stanford University and a MA and PhD in political science from the University of California, Berkeley.

== Career ==
Carpenter was a career officer with the United States Foreign Service. He served as deputy director of the Office of Russian Affairs, special assistant for the under secretary for political affairs, political-military officer in the Office of European Security, and political affairs and advisor on regional conflicts in the Office of Caucasus Affairs and Regional Conflicts. He served underseas in the U.S. Embassies in Poland, Slovenia, and Barbados.

Carpenter then worked in the White House as a special advisor for Europe and Eurasia to then-Vice President Biden and as director for Russia at the National Security Council. From 2015 to 2017, he served in the Pentagon as deputy assistant secretary of defense for Russia, Ukraine, Eurasia, and Conventional Arms Control. He has most recently worked as the managing director of the Penn Biden Center for Diplomacy and Global Engagement.

=== US Ambassador to OSCE ===
On June 23, 2021, President Joe Biden nominated Carpenter as U.S. Representative to the Organization for Security and Cooperation in Europe (OSCE), with the rank of Ambassador. On September 15, 2021, a hearing on his nomination was held before the Senate Foreign Relations Committee. On October 19, 2021, his nomination was reported favorably out of committee. On November 3, 2021, he was confirmed by the Senate by voice vote. On November 29, 2021, he assumed office as ambassador after presenting his credentials to OSCE Secretary General Helga Schmid.

Carpenter resigned in April 2024; his final permanent council session was on March 14, 2024.

He is currently at the International Institute for Strategic Studies as a Senior Fellow.

== Personal life ==
Carpenter speaks Polish, Slovene, English, Czech, French, and German.
