= 2014 United States Shadow Senator election in the District of Columbia =

- November 4, 2014
- Turnout: 33.2% ▼29.3pp
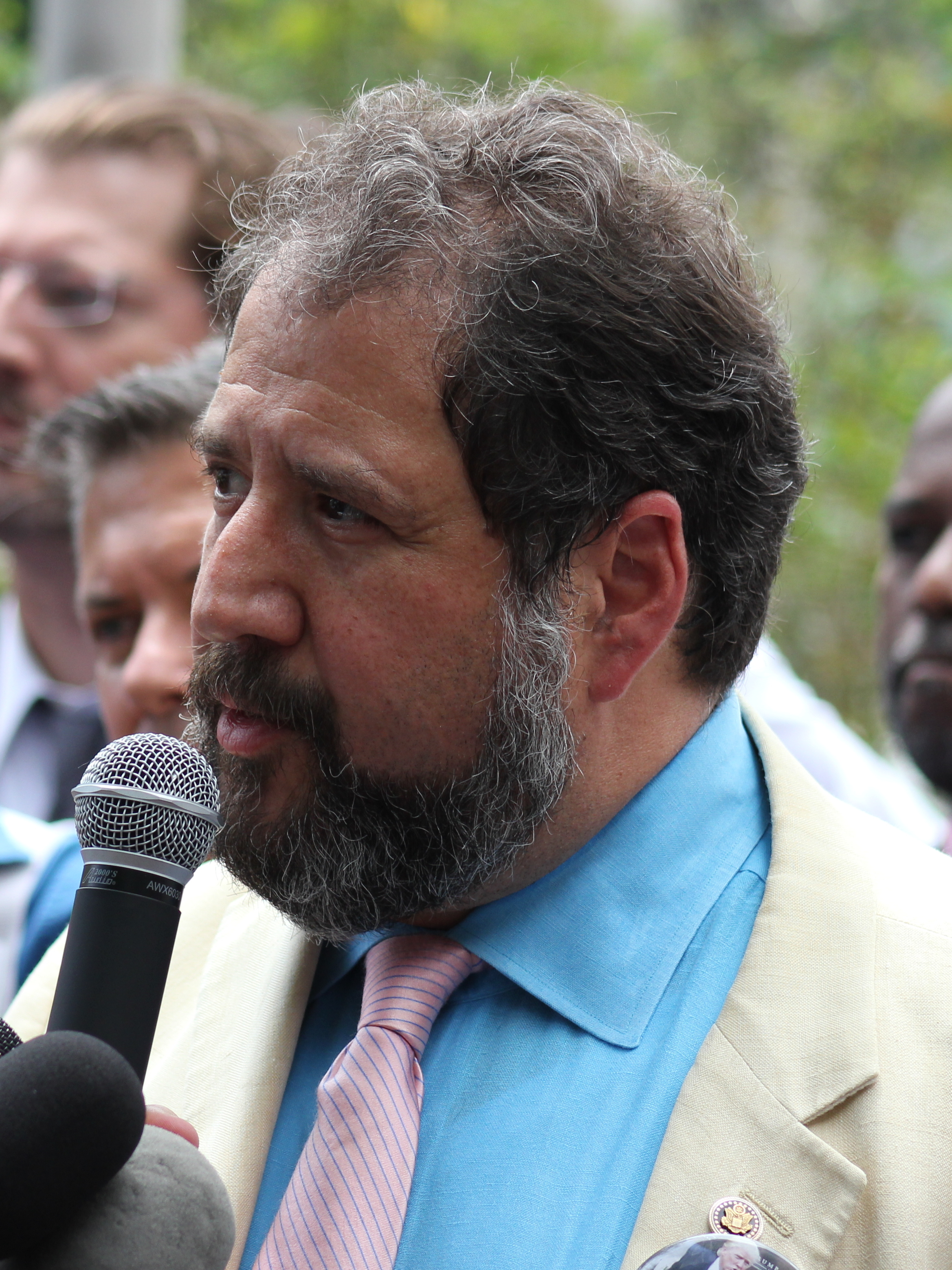

Nominee	Paul Strauss	David Schwartzman	Glenda Richmond
Party	Democratic	DC Statehood Green	Independent
Popular vote	116,901	15,710	10,702
Percentage	76.41%	10.27%	6.99%
- Strauss: 50–60% 60–70% 70–80% 80–90% No votes
Shadow Senator before election
Paul Strauss
Democratic
Elected Shadow Senator
Paul Strauss
Democratic

The 2014 United States Shadow Senator election in the District of Columbia took place on November 4, 2014, to elect a shadow member to the United States Senate to represent the District of Columbia. The member was only recognized by the District of Columbia and not officially sworn or seated by the United States Senate. Incumbent Paul Strauss won his closest primary challenge against businessman Pete Ross and was easily elected to a fourth term.

== Primary elections ==
Party primaries took place on April 1, 2014.

=== Democratic primary ===
==== Candidates ====
- Pete Ross, furniture businessman, landlord and former Army captain; candidate for Shadow Senator in 2012
- Paul Strauss, incumbent Shadow Senator

==== Results ====
Democratic primary results by ward: Strauss—50–60% Strauss—60–70%

District of Columbia Shadow Senator Democratic primary election, 2014
Party	Candidate	Votes	%
Democratic	Paul Strauss	41,292	59.02
Democratic	Pete Ross	26,809	38.32
Democratic	Write-ins	1,863	2.66
Total votes		60,129	100.0

=== Other primaries ===
D.C. Statehood Green candidate David Schwartzman and Libertarian candidate John Daniel were unopposed in their party primaries. A Republican primary was held with no candidates.

== General election ==
The general election took place on November 4, 2014.

=== Candidates ===
- John Daniel (Libertarian), tech entrepreneur
- Glenda Richmond (Independent), DC Statehood Leadership Coalition (DCSLC) founder and president
- David Schwartzman (D.C. Statehood Green), former professor at Howard University
- Paul Strauss (Democratic), incumbent

=== Results ===
General election results
Party	Candidate	Votes	%	±%
Democratic	Paul Strauss (Incumbent)	116,901	76.41	−4.41
DC Statehood Green	David Schwartzman	15,710	10.27	+2.84
Independent	Glenda Richmond	10,702	6.99	+6.99
Libertarian	John Daniel	7,826	5.11	+2.51
Write-in		1,864	1.22	+0.27
Total votes		153,003	100.00	
Democratic hold				
n/a	Overvotes	86		
n/a	Undervotes	24,269		
