= 2000 United States Shadow Senator election in the District of Columbia =

- November 7, 2000
Nominee	Florence Pendleton	Janet Helms
Party	Democratic	Republican
Popular vote	143,578	16,666
Percentage	88.97%	10.33%
Shadow Senator before election
Florence Pendleton
Democratic
Elected Shadow Senator
Florence Pendleton
Democratic

The 2000 United States Shadow Senator election in the District of Columbia took place on November 7, 2000, to elect a shadow member to the United States Senate to represent the District of Columbia. The member was only recognized by the District of Columbia and not officially sworn or seated by the United States Senate. Incumbent Shadow Senator Florence Pendleton won reelection to a third term with virtually no opposition.

== Primary elections ==
Party primaries took place on September 12, 2000.

=== Democratic primary ===
==== Candidates ====
- Florence Pendleton, incumbent Shadow Senator

==== Campaign ====
Pendleton faced no opposition in the Democratic primary.

==== Results ====
Democratic primary results
Party	Candidate	Votes	%
Democratic	Florence Pendleton	28,500	96.48%
Write-in		1,041	3.52%
Total votes		29,541	100.00%

== General election ==
Janet Helms, the Republican nominee, withdrew prior to the election. Pendleton won with nearly 90% of the vote.

=== Candidates ===
- Florence Pendleton (Democratic)
- Janet Helms (Republican)

=== Results ===
General election results
Party	Candidate	Votes	%
Democratic	Florence Pendleton (incumbent)	143,578	88.97%
Republican	Janet Helms	16,666	10.33%
Write-in		1,136	0.70%
Total votes		161,380	100.00%
Democratic hold			
