= 1990 United States Shadow Senator election in the District of Columbia =

- November 6, 1990
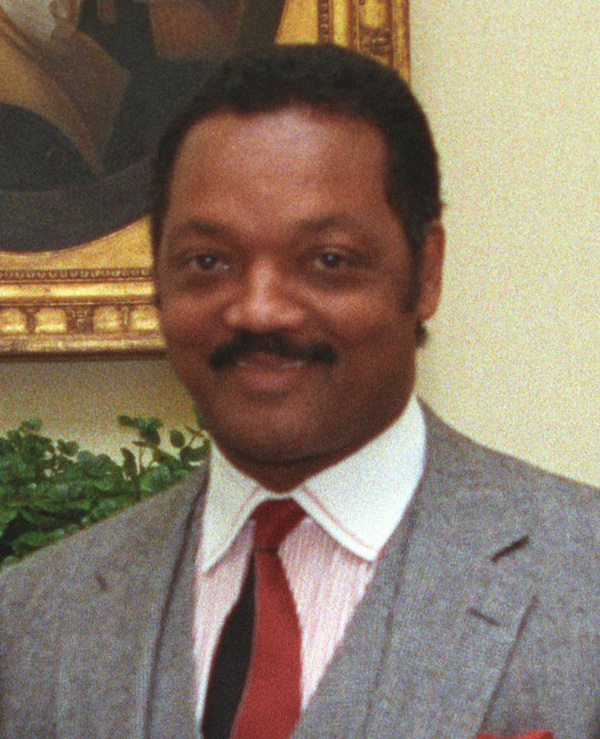

Candidate	Jesse Jackson	Florence Pendleton	Harry T. Alexander
Party	Democratic	Democratic	Independent
Popular vote	105,633	58,451	13,983
Percentage	46.80%	25.89%	6.19%
Candidate	Milton Francis	Joan Gillison
Party	Republican	Republican
Popular vote	13,538	12,845
Percentage	6.00%	5.69%
Elected Shadow Senators
Jesse Jackson
Florence Pendleton
Democratic

The 1990 United States Shadow Senator election in the District of Columbia took place on November 6, 1990, to elect two shadow members to the United States Senate to represent the District of Columbia. The members were only recognized by the District of Columbia and not officially sworn or seated by the United States Senate.

In this election candidates for both seats ran in the same general election (with two candidates advancing from any party primary), and the top two candidates by popular vote became the Shadow Senators for the District of Columbia. Democrats Jesse Jackson and Florence Pendleton would be elected to become the first senators of the District of Columbia, Jackson became the Class 2 senator while Pendleton became the Class 1 senator.

== Primary elections ==
Party primaries took place on September 11, 1990.

=== Democratic primary ===
==== Candidates ====
- James Forman, civil rights activist
- Marc Humphries, community activist
- Jesse Jackson, civil rights activist candidate for President in 1988
- Florence Pendleton, Advisory Neighborhood Commissioner
- Harry Thomas Jr., Advisory Neighborhood Commissioner

==== Results ====
1990 Shadow Senator democratic primary in Washington, D.C.
Party	Candidate	Votes	%
Democratic	Jesse Jackson	85,454	57.03
Democratic	Florence Pendleton	25,349	16.92
Democratic	Harry "Tommy" Thomas, Jr.	22,401	14.95
Democratic	James Forman	9,899	6.61
Democratic	Marc Humphries	6,739	4.50
Total votes		149,842	100.00

== General election ==
Jackson and Pendleton faced Republicans Milton Francis and Joan Gillison as well as several independents and members of minor parties. Both Democrats were elected as senators for the district because they received more votes than any other candidates

=== Candidates ===
- Jesse Jackson (Democratic)
- Florence Pendleton (Democratic)
- Harry T. Alexander (Independent)
- Milton Francis (Republican)
- Joan Gillison (Republican)
- Keith M. Wilkerson (D.C. Statehood)
- Anthony W. Peacock (D.C. Statehood)
- John West (Independent)
- David L. Whitehead (Independent)
- Sam Manuel (Socialist Workers)
- Lee Black (Independent)

=== Results ===
1990 Shadow Senator election in Washington, D.C.
Party	Candidate	Votes	%
Democratic	Jesse Jackson	105,633	46.80
Democratic	Florence Pendleton	58,451	25.89
Independent	Harry T. Alexander	13,983	6.19
Republican	Milton Francis	13,538	6.00
Republican	Joan Gillison	12,845	5.69
DC Statehood Green	Keith M. Wilkerson	4,545	2.01
DC Statehood Green	Anthony W. Peacock	4,285	1.90
Independent	John West	3,621	1.60
Independent	David L. Whitehead	3,341	1.48
Socialist Workers	Sam Manuel	2,765	1.23
Independent	Lee Black	2,728	1.21
Total votes		215,735	100.00
Democratic win (new seat)			
