= 1994 United States Shadow Senator election in the District of Columbia =

- November 8, 1994
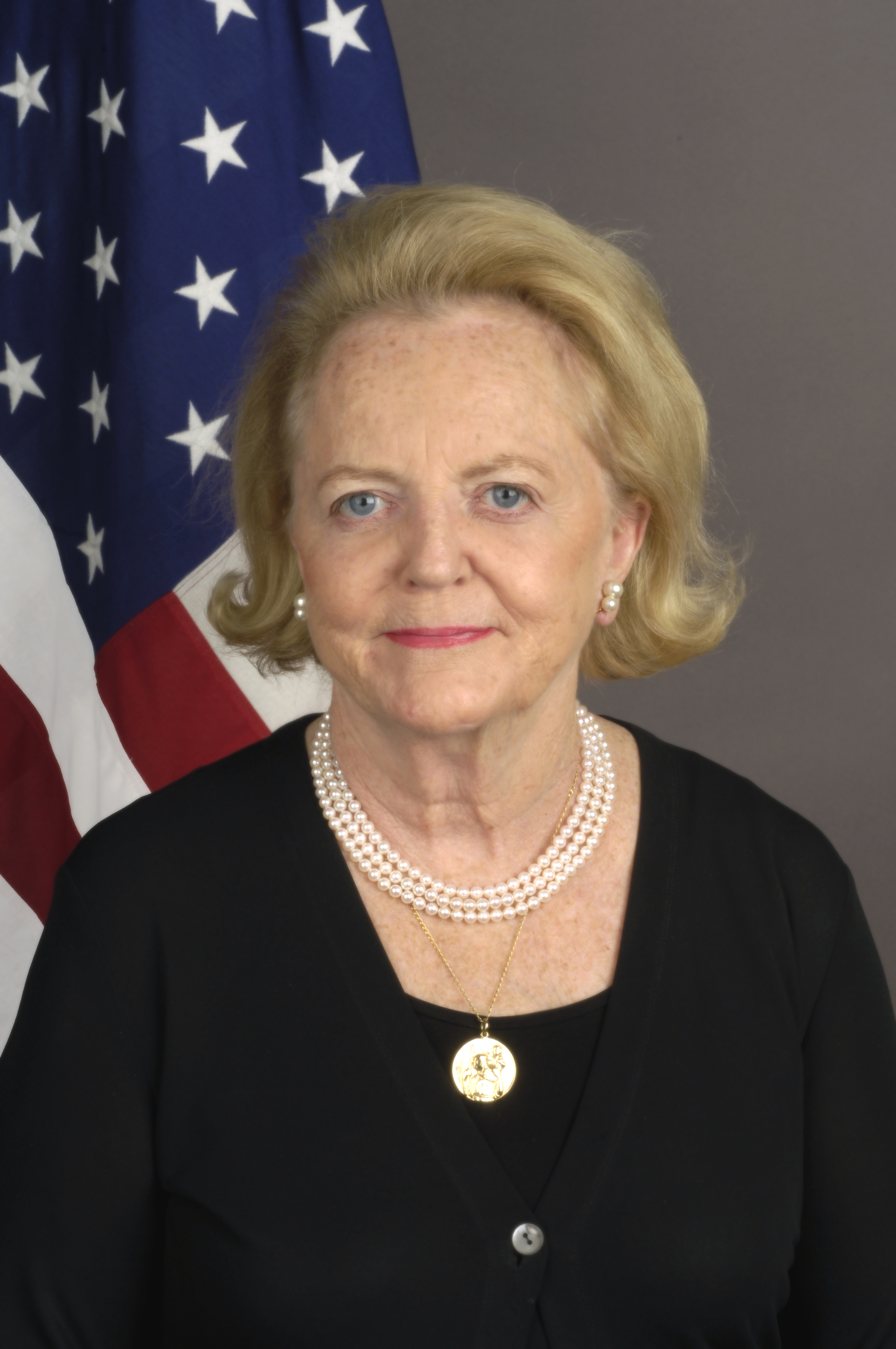

| Nominee | Florence Pendleton | Julie Finley | Mel Edwards |
| Party | Democratic | Republican | DC Statehood |
| Popular vote | 117,517 | 24,107 | 15,586 |
| Percentage | 74.04% | 15.19% | 9.82% |
Shadow Senator before election
Florence Pendleton
Democratic
Elected Shadow Senator
Florence Pendleton
Democratic

The 1994 United States Shadow Senator election in the District of Columbia took place on November 8, 1994, to elect a shadow member to the United States Senate to represent the District of Columbia. The member was only recognized by the District of Columbia and not officially sworn or seated by the United States Senate. Incumbent Shadow Senator Florence Pendleton won reelection to a second term.

== Primary elections ==
Party primaries took place on September 13, 1994.

=== Democratic primary ===
==== Candidates ====
- Florence Pendleton, incumbent Shadow Senator
- Stephen Sellows, disability rights activist

==== Campaign ====
Pendleton, first elected four years earlier as one of the first two Shadow Senators from the District, faced Stephen "Steve" Sellows, an advocate for the rights of disabled people. Pendleton easily won the primary, and Sellows was beaten to death less than a year following the election.

==== Results ====
Democratic primary results
| Party | Candidate | Votes | % |
|---|---|---|---|
| Democratic | Florence Pendleton | 78,576 | 76.83% |
| Democratic | Stephen Sellows | 20,512 | 20.06% |
| Write-in | | 3,180 | 3.11% |
| Total votes | | 102,268 | 100.00% |

== General election ==
Pendleton faced Republican Julie Finley, the chairwoman of the District of Columbia Republican Party (who won the Republican nomination via write-ins), and D.C. Statehood candidate Mel Edwards, a public relations expert. As is usual for Democrats in the District, Pendleton won in a landslide.

=== Candidates ===
- Florence Pendleton (Democratic)
- Julie Finley (Republican)
- Mel Edwards (D.C. Statehood)

=== Results ===
General election results
| Party | Candidate | Votes | % |
|---|---|---|---|
| Democratic | Florence Pendleton (incumbent) | 117,517 | 74.04% |
| Republican | Julie Finley | 24,107 | 15.19% |
| DC Statehood | Mel Edwards | 15,586 | 9.82% |
| Write-in | | 1,511 | 0.95% |
| Total votes | | 158,721 | 100.00% |
| Democratic hold | | | |
