= Center for Security and Emerging Technology =

American technology think tank

- Formation: 2019; 7 years ago
- Type: Think tank
- Purpose: Technology & security
- Headquarters: Washington, D.C., US
- Founding Director: Jason Gaverick Matheny
- Executive Director: Helen Toner
- Parent organization: School of Foreign Service, Georgetown University
- Website: cset.georgetown.edu

The Center for Security and Emerging Technology (CSET) is a think tank dedicated to policy analysis at the intersection of national and international security and emerging technologies, based at Georgetown University's School of Foreign Service.

Its mission is to study the security impacts of emerging technologies by analyzing data, supporting academic work in security and technology studies, and delivering nonpartisan analysis to the policy community. CSET focuses particularly on the intersection of security and artificial intelligence (AI). It addresses topics such as national competitiveness, opportunities related to AI, talent and knowledge flows, AI safety assessments, and AI applications in biotechnology and computer security.

CSET's founding director, Jason Gaverick Matheny, previously served as the director of the Intelligence Advanced Research Projects Activity. Dewey Murdick, former chief analytics officer and deputy chief scientist within the Department of Homeland Security, served as the executive director from 2021–2025. Its current executive director is Helen Toner who previously worked as a senior research analyst at Open Philanthropy.

Established in January 2019, CSET has received more than $57,000,000 in funding from the Open Philanthropy Project, the William and Flora Hewlett Foundation, and the Public Interest Technology University Network. CSET has faced criticism over its ties to the effective altruism movement.

== Publications ==
CSET produces a biweekly newsletter, policy.ai. It has published research on various aspects of the intersection between artificial intelligence and security, including changes to the U.S. AI workforce, immigration laws' effect on the AI sector, and technology transfer overseas. Its research output includes policy briefs and longer published reports.

A study published in January 2023 by CSET, OpenAI, and the Stanford Internet Observatory and covered by Forbes cited that "There are also possible negative applications of generative language models, or 'language models' for short. For malicious actors looking to spread propaganda—information designed to shape perceptions to further an actor’s interest—these language models bring the promise of automating the creation of convincing and misleading text for use in influence operations, rather than having to rely on human labor."

In May 2023, Chinese officials announced that they would be closing some of the access that foreign countries had into their public information as a result of studies from think tanks like CSET, citing concerns about cooperation between the U.S. military and the private sector.

In a September 2024 testimony before the United States House Select Committee on Strategic Competition between the United States and the Chinese Communist Party, former CSET employee Anna B. Puglisi stated that she received legal threats of libel from BGI Group for a report she wrote while serving at CSET. Puglisi had initially been refused legal indemnity from Georgetown University for the report. Following the testimony, a Georgetown University representative stated that it "stand[s] fully behind the report" and is "prepared to defend the report and its authors should the letters lead to formal legal action."
