= Ian C. Kelly =

American Foreign Service Officer and ambassador

Ian Kelly
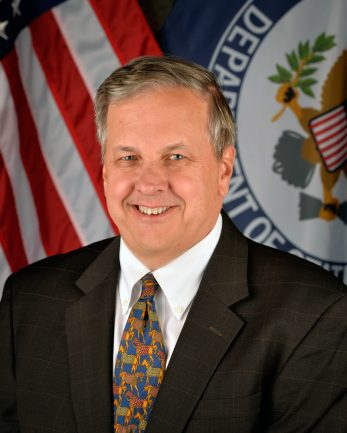
- Official portrait, 2015

United States Ambassador to Georgia
- In office September 17, 2015 – March 24, 2018
- President: Barack Obama; Donald Trump
- Deputy: Nicholas Berliner; Elizabeth Rood
- Preceded by: Richard Norland
- Succeeded by: Kelly Degnan

United States Ambassador to the OSCE
- In office March 11, 2010 – September 9, 2013
- President: Barack Obama
- Preceded by: Julie Finley
- Succeeded by: Dan Baer

20th Spokesperson for the United States Department of State
- In office May 11, 2009 – March 11, 2010
- President: Barack Obama
- Preceded by: Sean McCormack
- Succeeded by: Philip J. Crowley

Personal details
- Born: 1953 (age 72–73) Chicago, Illinois, U.S.
- Education: St. Olaf College (BA); Northwestern University (MA); Columbia University (PhD)

Ian Crawford Kelly (born 1953) is an American retired Foreign Service Officer and Ambassador. He is currently serving as the Ambassador in Residence at Northwestern University in Evanston, Illinois. He is an American former statesman and senior foreign service officer who last served as the United States Ambassador to Georgia, from 2015 to 2018. He previously served as the U.S. ambassador to the Organization for Security and Cooperation in Europe (OSCE) from 2010 to 2013. Prior to his ambassadorship, Kelly held a variety of high-level roles at the U.S. State Department, including serving as the department spokesman under Secretary Hillary Clinton.

== Career ==
Before beginning his career at the State Department, Kelly taught Russian at Columbia University, where he also received his doctorate in Slavic Languages and Literatures in 1986. He also holds a B.A. from St. Olaf College and an M.A. from Northwestern University. After joining the Foreign Service, he served in a variety of positions, including the Director of the Information Center in Belgrade, Yugoslavia from 1990 to 1992, and Assistant Cultural Affairs Officer in Leningrad and Moscow, U.S.S.R. from 1987 to 1990. In these capacities, Kelly was involved in setting up embassies across the former Soviet Republics, a task that took him to all 15 newly independent states. He has studied Italian, Serbo-Croatian and Turkish at the National Foreign Affairs Training Center of the State Department.

In 1994, Kelly was appointed Director of Democratic Initiatives to the Newly Independent States (NIS) at the State Department where he coordinated the activities of nearly a dozen federal agencies involved in democracy building in the former Soviet Union, and oversaw an annual budget of around $80 million. He later served as Press Attaché at the American Embassy in Ankara (1997–2000), Press Attaché at Embassy Rome (2000–2004), and Public Affairs Advisor at the U.S. Mission to NATO (2004–2007).

In August 2007, Kelly was appointed Director of the Office of Russian Affairs in Washington D.C., where he was responsible for managing the development and implementation of U.S. policy towards Russia. In May 2009, he was appointed as a senior spokesperson for the State Department in Washington.

== Ambassadorships ==
On November 30, 2009, President Barack Obama announced his intent to nominate Kelly to be U.S. Representative to the Organization for Security and Cooperation in Europe, with the rank of Ambassador. His nomination was presented to the Senate by U.S. Senator Benjamin L. Cardin (D-MD), Chairman of the Commission on Security and Cooperation in Europe (U.S. Helsinki Commission), who praised Kelly's deep experience serving throughout the former Soviet Union, and emphasized the critical role of the OSCE in the current geopolitical climate. Kelly was confirmed by the Senate on March 10, 2010, by a voice vote with bipartisan support.

Kelly's tenure as Ambassador coincided with several major geopolitical events for OSCE countries, including pro-democracy protests in Russia, a controversial constitutional amendment in Kazakhstan extending the tenure of President Nursultan Nazarbayev through 2020, and ethnic riots in Kyrgyzstan in 2010. In 2012–2013, Kelly was the U.S. Co-chair of the OSCE Minsk Group, the diplomatic mechanism set up to resolve the conflict in the disputed Nagorno-Karabakh region. Kelly was replaced by Daniel Baer on September 10, 2013.

President Obama nominated Kelly to succeed Richard Norland as the U.S. ambassador to Georgia on March 12, 2015. He was confirmed by the Senate on June 25, 2015, and sworn in on September 11, 2015. He retired both as ambassador and from the foreign service in March 2018.

== Academic career ==
After retirement from diplomatic service, Ambassador Kelly began teaching in the Departments of International Studies and Slavic Literatures at Northwestern University in April 2018.

Diplomatic posts
Preceded by Julie Finley	United States Ambassador to the OSCE; 2010–2013	Succeeded by Daniel Baer
Preceded by Richard Norland	United States Ambassador to Georgia; 2015–2018	Succeeded by Ross Wilson (acting)
