= Helen Toner =

Director of strategy at CSET

- Born: 1992 (age 33–34); Melbourne, Australia
- Education: University of Melbourne B.Sc. Chemical Engineering (2014); Georgetown University M.A. Security Studies (2021)
- Occupation: Executive Director
- Employer: Center for Security and Emerging Technology (CSET)
- Known for: Former board member of OpenAI
- Website: cset.georgetown.edu/staff/helen-toner/

Helen Toner (born 1992) is an Australian researcher, and the interim executive director at Georgetown’s Center for Security and Emerging Technology. She was a board member of OpenAI when CEO Sam Altman was fired.

In 2024, TIME magazine listed Toner among 100 most influential people in AI.

== Early life and education ==
Toner was born in 1992 in Melbourne, Australia to two doctors. She graduated from the University of Melbourne in 2014 with a B.Sc. in Chemical Engineering. She participated in UN Youth, an organization that provides student engagement in international diplomacy simulations. She was introduced to the effective altruism movement while a university student in Melbourne. In 2018, she spent nine months in Beijing studying Chinese and working as a research affiliate on AI and defense for Oxford University's Centre for the Governance of AI. From 2019 to 2021, she attended the Walsh School of Foreign Service at Georgetown University in Washington, D.C. and graduated with an M.A. in security studies.

== Career ==
=== Early career ===
After graduating, Toner worked with GiveWell (a charity evaluator co-founded by Holden Karnofsky) and Open Philanthropy, an initiative co-founded by Dustin Moskovitz and Karnofsky. At GiveWell, she researched AI policy issues, including its military applications and on the influence of geopolitics on the development of AI. In May 2017, Toner recommended a grant of $1.5 million by Open Philanthropy to the UCLA School of Law to "support a fellowship, research, and meetings on governance and policy issues related to advanced artificial intelligence." In August, she recommended a grant of $260,000 to former Secretary of the Navy Richard Danzig at the Center for a New American Security (CNAS) in August 2017 to support the publication of a manuscript on potential risks from advanced technologies.

=== Center for Security and Emerging Technology ===
In January 2019, Toner was appointed as the director of strategy of the Center for Security and Emerging Technology (CSET) think tank with the Walsh School at Georgetown University in Washington, D.C. CSET was established through a $55 million over five years grant to Georgetown by Open Philanthropy. In March 2022, she was appointed the full-time director of strategy and foundational research grants. She continued her work at CSET, advising policymakers on AI policy and strategy, during and after her tenure on the board of OpenAI. She also studied China's AI industry and has co-written articles in Foreign Affairs.

=== OpenAI ===
In late 2021, Toner was invited by Holden Karnofsky to replace him on the board of OpenAI. OpenAI is owned by investors including Microsoft, but the organization has retained its nonprofit governance structure, making board members accountable to the organization's altruistic goals, rather than shareholders.

In October 2023 she published the report "Decoding Intentions: Artificial Intelligence and Costly Signals" with two co-authors, writing

OpenAI has also drawn criticism for many other safety and ethics issues related to the launches of ChatGPT and GPT-4, including regarding copyright issues, labor conditions for data annotators, and the susceptibility of their products to “jailbreaks” that allow users to bypass safety controls.

The publication was reportedly a source of tension between Toner and OpenAI CEO Sam Altman. Altman reportedly complained that the paper criticised OpenAI's efforts to keep its technology safe while praising the approach taken by rival company Anthropic. Altman reportedly called Toner and said that her paper "could cause problems" due to the Federal Trade Commission's investigation into OpenAI's data collection.

On November 17, 2023, Toner along with three other board members voted to remove Sam Altman as CEO of OpenAI. The board's stated reason was that Altman was "not consistently candid in his communications” with the board, and was influenced by perceptions that Altman was manipulating board members for his own gain. Four days later, in a deal reached between OpenAI's board and Sam Altman, Toner, Tasha McCauley and Ilya Sutskever would leave the board to be replaced by former Secretary of the Treasury Lawrence Summers and Bret Taylor, and Altman would be reinstated as CEO.

In May 2024, in a podcast, while explaining the board's rationale for firing Altman, she claimed that he had misled the board "on multiple occasions" about its existing safety processes, including withholding information, wilfully mispresenting things happening at the company and outright lying to the board. She claimed that the board hadn't been informed about the launch of ChatGPT, and found out about its release through the social media platform Twitter. She also noted that Altman hadn't informed the board that he owned the OpenAI Startup Fund, a venture capital fund over which he made management decisions, even though he had claimed "to be an independent board member with no financial interest in the company."

== Personal life ==
Toner is married to a German scientist and has one child.
