= Julie Finley =

United States Ambassador to the Organization for Security and Co-operation in Europe

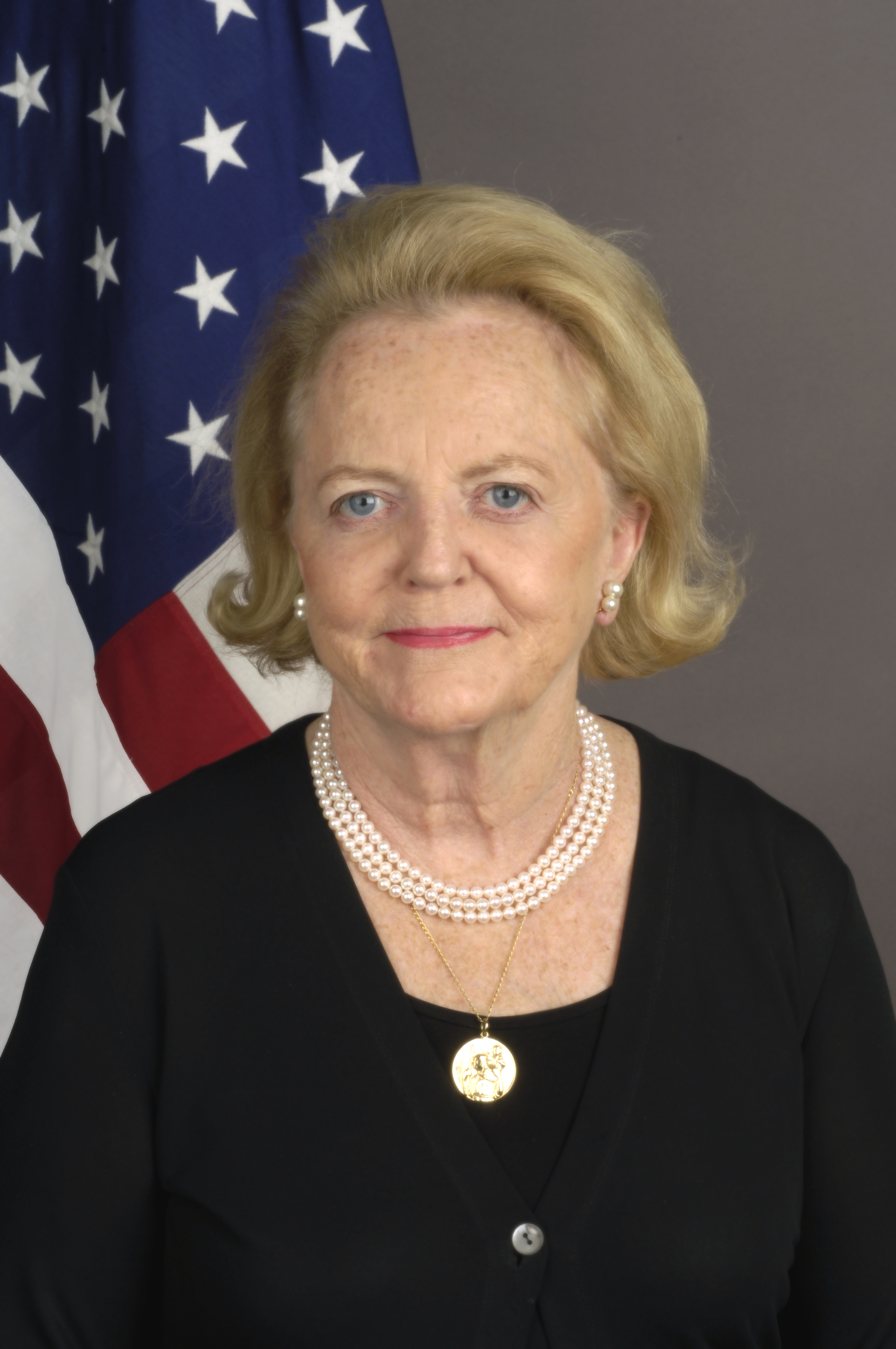
- Julie Finley in 2005

United States Ambassador to the Organization for Security and Cooperation in Europe
- In office August 18, 2005 – January 20, 2009
- President: George W. Bush
- Preceded by: Stephan Minikes
- Succeeded by: Ian Kelly

Personal details
- Born: Julie Hamm c. 1937 (age 88–89)
- Party: Republican
- Education: Vassar College (BA)

Julie Finley (born c. 1937) was the United States Ambassador to the Organization for Security and Co-operation in Europe (OSCE). She was nominated by President George W. Bush.

== Education ==
Finley is a 1952 graduate of the Potomac School and a 1955 graduate of Miss Porter's School. She then attended Vassar College, graduating with an A.B. degree.

== Career ==
After graduation, Finley worked for several media organizations, including NBC's Office of Corporate Affairs, ABC News and the Washington Post. She also worked for syndicated columnist Joseph Kraft.

Finley has been active in Republican politics for many years and served the party in a number of capacities. She was the Washington, D.C., Republican Party Chairman from 1992 through 2000 and the D.C. Republican National Committeewoman from 2000 to 2004. Finley also served as National Finance Co-Chairman for the Bush-Cheney 2004 campaign for Washington, D.C., and as Co-Chairman of Team 100, the major fundraising arm for the Republican National Committee, from 1997 through 2004.

Finley assumed her duties in Vienna, Austria, on August 18, 2005.

In November 2005, in response to a report that press freedoms in Kazakhstan were being violated by President Nursultan Nazarbayev, Finley made a statement that, according to reporter C.J. Chivers of the New York Times, seemed to dismiss the significance of the crackdown on the press. Addressing a Kazakh official in a speech during an OSCE session in Vienna, Finley stated, "When I was in Kazakhstan a couple of weeks ago I had the interesting pleasure of reading some of this [sic] newspapers that have been seized. Maybe you saved some readers some waste of time, anyway."

The U.S. State Department had been pushing Nazarbayev to respect press freedoms, but that message "became mixed" when Finley made her comment, Chivers wrote. The Times reported that the transcript of the speech was removed from the American mission's website but had already been circulated independently by Western diplomats. Finley declined to comment to the Times about her statement, though a colleague said that the quote had been ad libbed and did not reflect the Ambassador's "true feelings."

In 2020, Finley, along with over 130 other former Republican national security officials, signed a statement that asserted that President Trump was unfit to serve another term, and "To that end, we are firmly convinced that it is in the best interest of our nation that Vice President Joe Biden be elected as the next President of the United States, and we will vote for him."

== Personal ==
Finley is the daughter of Edward Frederick Hamm Jr. (March 27, 1908 – March 19, 1985) and Joy Elizabeth (Fairman) Hamm (April 13, 1910 – April 15, 1990). Her father was the first managing director of the Interstate Commerce Commission. She was married to William Thompson Finley Jr. (May 2, 1936 – May 21, 1992) and they had two sons. Her husband was a lawyer who clerked for Associate Supreme Court Justice William J. Brennan Jr. in 1964 and became a partner in the law firm of Steptoe & Johnson in January 1991.

Party political offices
Preceded by Joan Gillison	Republican nominee for U.S. Shadow Senator from the District of Columbia (Class 1); 1994	Succeeded by Janet Helms
Diplomatic posts
Preceded by Stephan Minikes	United States Ambassador to the Organization for Security and Cooperation in Europe; 2005–2009	Succeeded by Ian Kelly
