= Mayoral elections in Washington, D.C. =

Washington, D.C., is a political division coterminous with the District of Columbia, the federal district of the United States. The enactment of the District of Columbia Home Rule Act in 1973 provided for an elected mayor for the first time in nearly a century. Starting in 1974, there have been thirteen elections for mayor and six people have held the office. The Democratic Party has immense political strength in the district. In each of the mayoral elections, the district has solidly voted for the Democratic candidate, with no margin less than 14 percentage points.

The mayor serves a four-year term. In 1994, residents approved a ballot measure limiting the mayor to two consecutive terms, despite simultaneously electing Marion Barry to his fourth term. In 2001, the D.C. Council repealed the measure, abolishing term limits for all elected positions.

== Mayoral elections ==
Key for parties
Democratic Party – (D)
D.C. Statehood Green Party – (STG)
D.C. Statehood Party – (ST)
Independent candidate – (I)
Republican Party – (R)
U.S. Labor Party – (L)

Mayoral elections in the District of Columbia 1974 to present
Year	Winner			Runner-up			Other candidate (Note: For purposes of these lists, other candidates are defined as those who were in third place. Write-in totals are not represented.)			Ref.
Year	Candidate	Votes	%	Candidate	Votes	%	Candidate	Votes	%	Ref.
1974	Walter Washington (D)	84,676	80.50%	Sam Harris (I)	7,514	7.14%	Jackson R. Champion (R)	3,703	3.52%	
1978	Marion Barry (D)	68,354	70.16%	Arthur Fletcher (R)	27,366	28.09%	Susan Pennington (L)	1,066	1.09%	
1982	Marion Barry (D)	95,007	80.99%	E. Brooke Lee Jr. (R)	16,501	14.07%	Dennis S. Sobin (I)	2,673	2.28%	
1986	Marion Barry (D)	79,142	61.37%	Carol Schwartz (R)	42,354	32.84%	Brian Moore (I)	3,518	2.73%	
1990	Sharon Pratt (D)	140,011	86.12%	Maurice Turner (R)	18,653	11.47%	Alvin C. Frost (ST)	1,116	0.69%	
1994	Marion Barry (D)	102,884	56.02%	Carol Schwartz (R)	76,902	41.87%	—N/a	—N/a	—N/a	
1998	Anthony A. Williams (D)	92,504	66.16%	Carol Schwartz (R)	42,280	30.24%	John Gloster (ST)	2,312	1.65%	
2002	Anthony A. Williams (D)	79,841	60.61%	Carol Schwartz (R)	45,407	34.47%	Steve Donkin (STG)	3,240	2.46%	
2006	Adrian Fenty (D)	106,848	88.58%	David Kranich (R)	7,517	6.23%	Chris Otten (STG)	4,914	4.07%	
2010	Vincent C. Gray (D)	97,978	74.2%	Write-ins (Note: More than 90 percent of the write-ins were for Adrian Fenty, the incumbent mayor, who lost the Democratic primary against Gray and chose not to run under another party or as an independent.)	29,599	22.42%	Carlos Allen (I)	2,279	1.73%	
2014	Muriel Bowser (D)	96,666	55.15%	David Catania (I)	61,388	35.02%	Carol Schwartz (I)	12,327	7.03%	
2018	Muriel Bowser (D)	171,608	76.39%	Ann Wilcox (STG)	20,950	9.33%	Dustin Canter (I)	15,478	6.89%	
2022	Muriel Bowser (D)	147,433	74.62%	Rodney Grant (I)	29,531	14.95%	Stacia Hall (R)	11,510	5.83%	

=== Graph ===
The following graph shows the margin of victory of the Democratic Party over the runner-up in the 13 mayoral elections Washington, D.C., has held.

View source data.

== See also ==
- Elections in Washington, D.C.
- Electoral history of Marion Barry
