= 1998 Washington, D.C., mayoral election =

- November 3, 1998
- Turnout: 40.2%
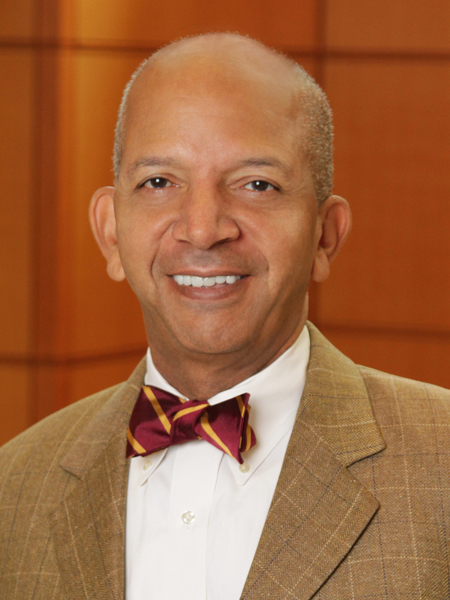

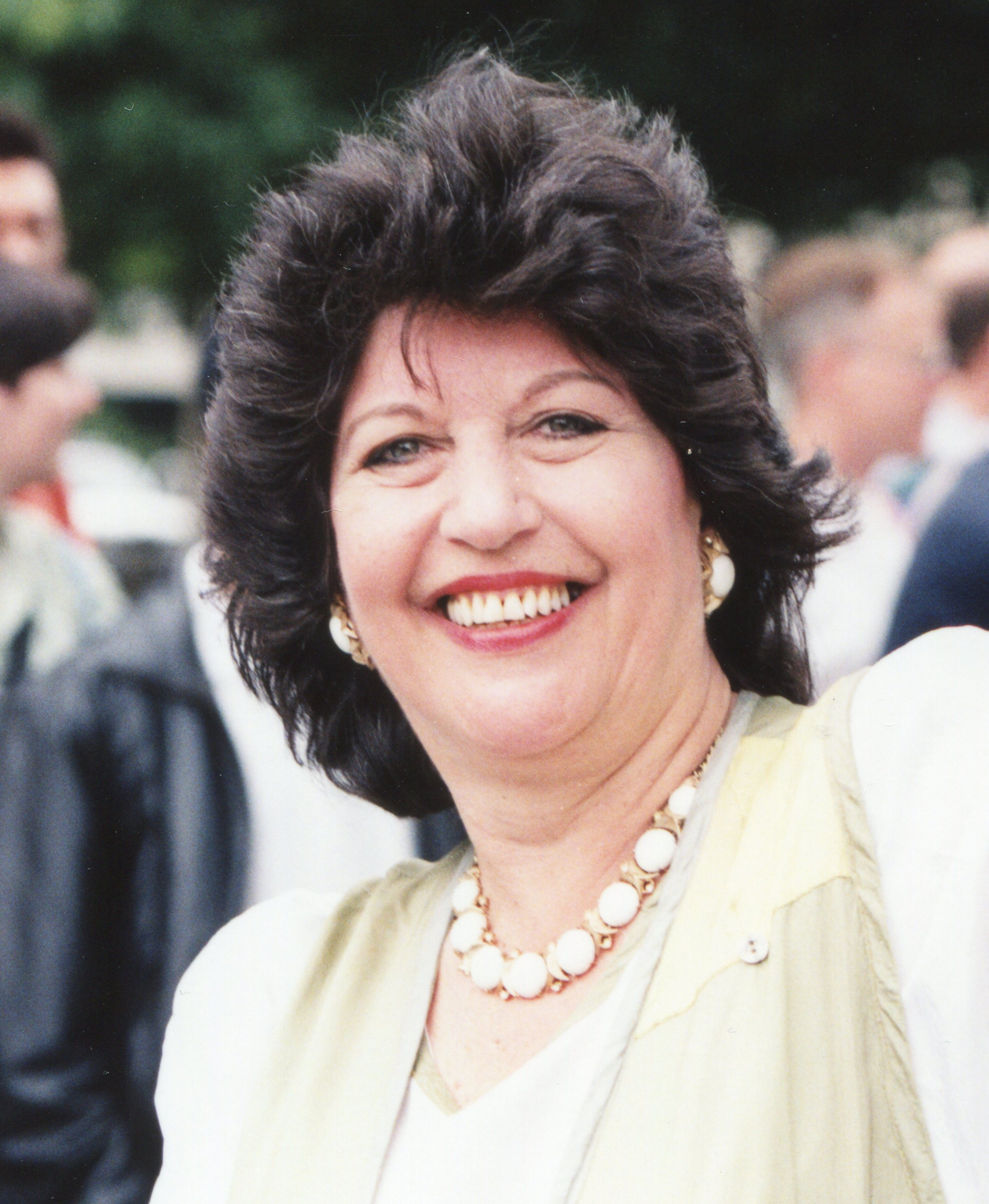
Nominee	Anthony A. Williams	Carol Schwartz
Party	Democratic	Republican
Popular vote	92,504	42,280
Percentage	66.16%	30.24%
Mayor before election
Marion Barry
Democratic
Elected mayor
Anthony A. Williams
Democratic

On November 3, 1998, Washington, D.C., held an election for its mayor. The Democratic candidate, former chief financial officer (CFO) Anthony A. Williams, defeated Republican candidate Carol Schwartz, a member of the Council of the District of Columbia. The parties' primary elections had been held on September 15, 1998.

== Party primaries ==
Anthony A. Williams, who had been appointed as chief financial officer under outgoing mayor Marion Barry in 1995, ran as a technocratic candidate against three members of the Council of the District of Columbia. The Washington Post reported that the entry of Williams, who at the time had only resided in DC for three years, "vastly changed the playing field for three council members who had prepared to run against Barry or against each other in the Democratic primary".

His closest opponent, councilmember Kevin P. Chavous, received the support of the Metropolitan Washington AFL-CIO, their first mayoral primary endorsement since the 1986 Washington election.

=== Democratic primary ===
District of Columbia Democratic primary election, 1998
Party	Candidate	Votes	%
Democratic	Anthony A. Williams	45,216	49.91
Democratic	Kevin P. Chavous	31,499	34.77
Democratic	Jack Evans	8,621	9.52
Democratic	Harold Brazil	3,994	4.41
Democratic	Sylvia Robinson-Green	363	0.40
Democratic	Jeff Gildenhorn	358	0.40
Democratic	Osie Thorpe	167	0.18
Democratic	Write-in	367	0.41
Total votes		90,585	100

=== Republican primary ===
Councilwoman Carol Schwartz won the Republican nomination as the only candidate on the primary ballot. Former US Senator from South Dakota Larry Pressler considered a run for mayor but ultimately decided against it.

District of Columbia Republican primary election, 1998
Party	Candidate	Votes	%
Republican	Carol Schwartz	2,516	88.53
Republican	Write-in	326	11.47
Total votes		2,842	100

=== D.C. Statehood primary ===
District of Columbia Statehood primary election, 1998
Party	Candidate	Votes	%
DC Statehood	John Gloster	245	62.98
DC Statehood	Write-in	144	37.02
Total votes		389	100

=== Umoja Party primary ===
District of Columbia Umoja primary election, 1998
Party	Candidate	Votes	%
Umoja	Write-in	128	100
Total votes		128	100

== General election ==
District of Columbia mayoral election, 1998
Party	Candidate	Votes	%
Democratic	Anthony A. Williams	92,504	66.16
Republican	Carol Schwartz	42,280	30.24
DC Statehood	John Gloster	2,312	1.65
Independent	Alpha Brown	693	0.49
Independent	Brian P. Moore	501	0.36
Independent	Faith Dane	430	0.31
Socialist Workers	Sam Manuel	330	0.24
Independent	Albert Ceccone	236	0.17
Write-in		539	0.38
Total votes		139,825	100
Democratic hold			
