= Jeffrey Gildenhorn =

American restaurateur (1943–2017)

- Born: January 27, 1943; Washington, D.C., US
- Died: June 28, 2017 (aged 74); Washington, D.C., US
- Occupations: Restaurateur and political figure

Jeffrey Gildenhorn (January 27, 1943 – June 28, 2017) was an American restaurateur and political figure in Washington, D.C. He took over his family's liquor store after his father's death before opening several restaurants, most notably the American City Diner on Connecticut Avenue in Chevy Chase that he operated from 1988 until his death. Gildenhorn chaired the D.C. Boxing and Wrestling Commission, led a 1989 attempt to buy the Atlanta Braves and move the team to Washington, and was a minor candidate in the 1998 Democratic primary for mayor, where he campaigned on legalized prostitution.

== Early life and education ==
Gildenhorn was born in Washington, D.C., on January 27, 1943. His father immigrated to D.C. from Poland as a child and his mother was from Winnipeg. He grew up in the Shepherd Park neighborhood. His grandfather founded Circle Liquors at Connecticut Avenue and Livingston Street in 1939. His cousin Joseph Bernard Gildenhorn served as U.S. Ambassador to Switzerland. Gildenhorn graduated from Coolidge Senior High School and spent a preparatory year at the Bullis School before enrolling at Georgetown University in 1962.

== Career ==
The American City Diner put playful and political messages on the sign outside its entrance.

=== First businesses ===
Gildenhorn took over Circle Liquors after his father's death and after he left Georgetown University in 1965. (Note: Gildenhorn said in an interview that he graduated from Georgetown University, but multiple sources also said that he "dropped out" to run the liquor store, "left" Georgetown University, and in a later oral history, Gildenhorn said he "graduated.") He moved the store in 1973 and aggressively set sale prices to ward off potential competitors in the neighborhood. In 1979 he opened the Fishery, a fish market and restaurant. He later also opened Rossini's, an Italian restaurant. During this time, Gildenhorn went through what he described as a "beauty pageant phase" where he judged pageants in several states.

=== American City Diner ===
In 1988 Gildenhorn opened the American City Diner on Connecticut Avenue in Chevy Chase, which was the sixth store or restaurant that Gildenhorn owned in the neighborhood. He said the idea was inspired by the film Back to the Future, and he commissioned a stainless steel building in the style of a 1950s diner, with a reproduction 1940s billboard outside. The menu featured all-day breakfast and milkshakes, and the restaurant had jukeboxes at the tables. In 1994, after finding initial success, with the diner, Gildenhorn decided to open a second location on Wisconsin Avenue, but closed it after four years. In 2003 he added a small theater that screened classic films after the closure of a nearby theater. Gildenhorn would later accuse the Silver Diner of copying his restaurant idea.

The diner's outdoor billboard sign was controversial upon its construction, with local Advisory Neighborhood Commission members saying that it was a billboard built without permit. Gildenhorn argued that it was an "aesthetic panel." Another sign outside the diner later became known for Gildenhorn's political messages. These included a campaign sign for his mayoral campaign in 1998 and anti-Donald Trump messages during the 2016 presidential campaign. The restaurant would close the year after his death in 2018.

== Political and sports activities ==
Gildenhorn was a strong supporter of Marion Barry during his initial campaigns and Barry appointed him to the D.C. Boxing and Wrestling Commission in the 1980s because of his support. Gildenhorn later became the organization's chairman. In 1993, he was responsible for bringing two world championship fights to RFK Stadium. He helped to create "Fight Night", a charity black-tie event that he described as "a boxing fan's dream and a married man's fantasy" because of the Washington Redskins cheerleaders, ring girls, and models that were present to serve at the event. In 1990 he was appointed to the D.C. Development Corporation.

After donating thousands to Barry's mayoral campaigns, Gildenhorn publicly broke with him during the 1994 mayoral election, saying that he felt "foolish" for "sticking his neck out" after Barry's controversies.

A longtime Washington baseball fan, Gildenhorn led a 1989 attempt to buy the Atlanta Braves from Ted Turner and move the team to Washington, offering up to $80 million. Gildenhorn described it later by saying it wasn't a "promiscuous offer", explaining that they were close to a deal in his estimation.

=== 1998 Mayoral primary ===
In 1998, Gildenhorn ran in the Democratic primary for mayor, spending about $200,000 of his own money in what was described as a "quixotic" campaign by The Washington Post. He said that he would campaign for improved health care and housing opportunities for elderly residents and would put more resources into the University of the District of Columbia. One of his central proposals was to legalize prostitution, arguing that legal brothels would become strong sources of tax revenue for the city. He received 358 votes in the September 15 primary won by Anthony A. Williams. He later donated to Williams's general election campaign.

== Personal life and death ==
Gildenhorn was a member of B'nai Israel Congregation. He brought Liz Wickersham, a Playboy cover model, to the Cancer Ball in DC in the 1970s and was described as an "eligible bachelor" during this period. His marriage to Maxine Lewis ended in divorce.

On June 28, 2017, Gildenhorn choked while dining at The Palm in downtown Washington and the episode was related to Parkinson's disease. He was taken to George Washington University Hospital, where he was pronounced dead at age 74.

== External link ==
- Washington Post obituary page
