= Gildenhorn =

Gildenhorn is a surname. Notable people and fictional characters with the surname include:

== Real people ==
- Joseph Bernard Gildenhorn (1929–2023), American lawyer
- Jeffrey Gildenhorn (1943–2017), American restaurateur

== Fiction ==
- Jenny Gildenhorn, in the American sitcom Brooklyn Nine-Nine
