= 1994 Washington, D.C., mayoral election =

- November 8, 1994
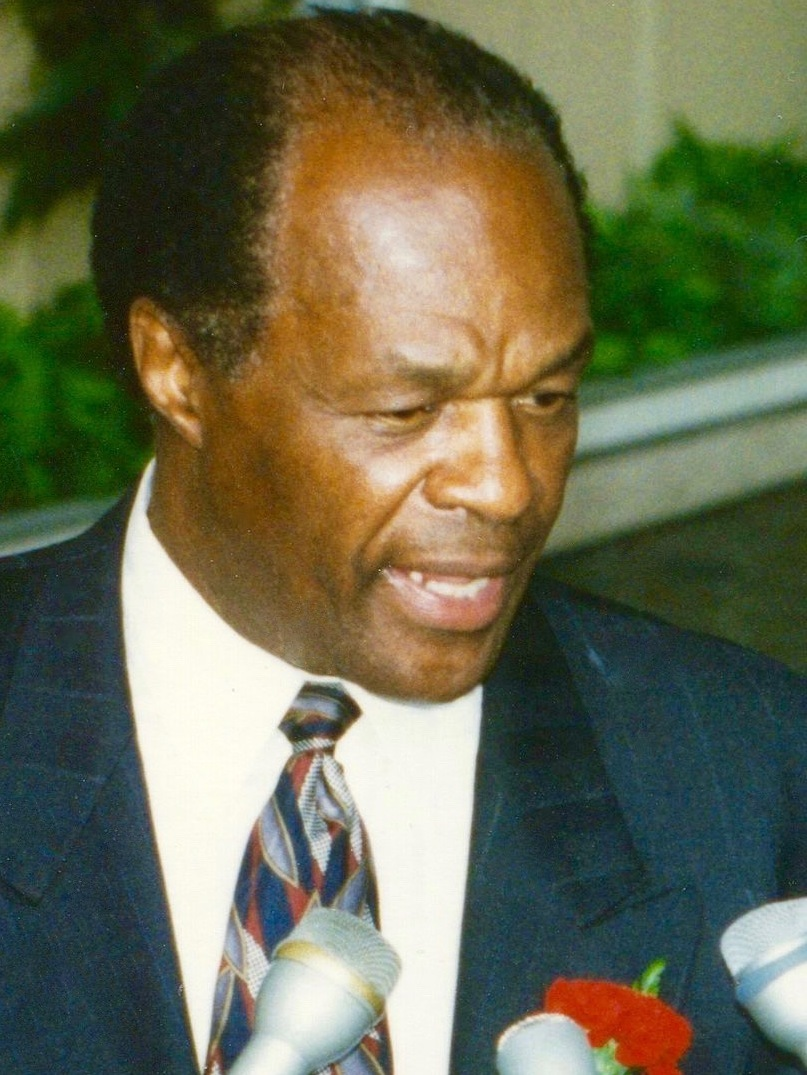

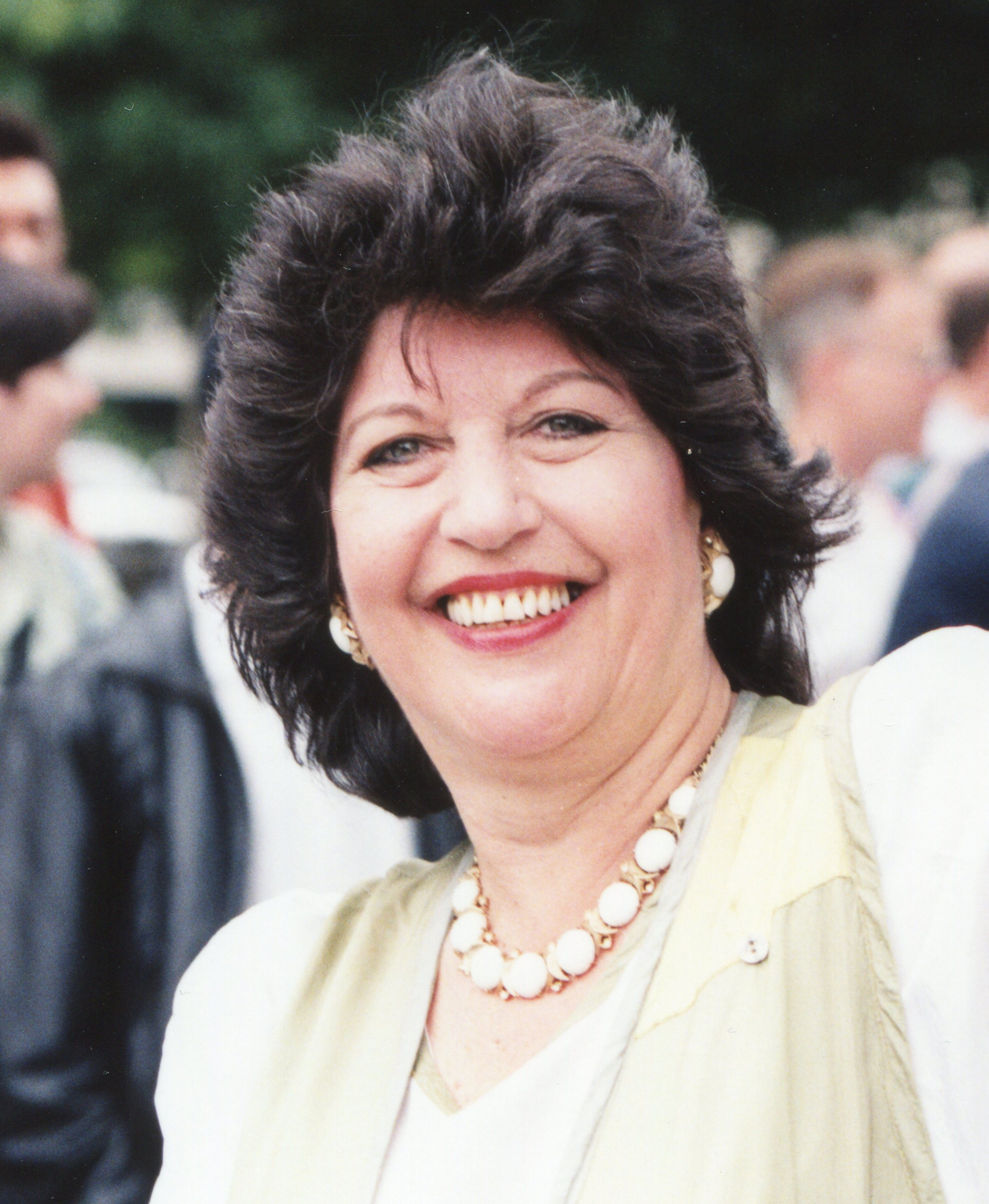
Nominee	Marion Barry	Carol Schwartz
Party	Democratic	Republican
Popular vote	102,884	76,902
Percentage	56.02%	41.87%
- Barry: 40–50% 50–60% 60–70% 70–80% 80–90% >90% Schwartz: 40–50% 50–60% 60–70% 70–80% 80–90% >90%
Mayor before election
Sharon Pratt Kelly
Democratic
Elected mayor
Marion Barry
Democratic

On November 8, 1994, Washington, D.C., held an election for its mayor. It featured the return of Marion Barry, who served as mayor from 1979 until 1991.

Barry served six months in prison on a cocaine conviction. After his release from prison, Barry ran successfully for the Ward 8 city council seat in 1992, running under the slogan "He May Not Be Perfect, But He's Perfect for D.C." Upon this victory, Barry said he was "not interested in being mayor" again.

This was by far the smallest Democratic victory margin in a regularly scheduled partisan citywide election since the city was granted home rule.

== Party primaries ==
=== Democratic primary ===
Sharon Pratt Kelly succeeded Barry as mayor. In the second year of her term, Barry loyalists mounted a recall campaign, which, although unsuccessful, weakened her administration.

Councillor John Ray received the endorsement of The Washington Post and was favored to win the primary. However, Barry ran a grassroots campaign, touting his record balancing the budget in 10 of his 12 years as mayor.

1994 Washington, D.C. mayoral election, Democratic primary results
Party	Candidate	Votes	%	±%
Democratic	Marion Barry	66,777	47.18	
Democratic	John Ray	52,088	36.80	
Democratic	Sharon Pratt Kelly (incumbent)	18,717	13.22	
Democratic	Otis Holloman Troupe	1,897	1.34	
Democratic	Write-in	829	0.59	
Democratic	Don Reeves	598	0.42	
Democratic	Osie Thorpe	456	0.32	
Majority				
Turnout				

=== Republican primary ===
1994 Washington, D.C. mayoral election, Republican primary results
Party	Candidate	Votes	%	±%
Republican	Carol Schwartz	3,764	74.85	
Republican	Brian P. Moore	641	12.75	
Republican	Write-in	624	12.41	
Majority				
Turnout				

== General election ==
=== Campaign ===
A major issue in during the general election campaign was the question of how to cut $140 million from the city budget, as the city had been mandated to do by Congress. Though Barry was seen by some as responsible for the bureaucracy and Schwartz criticized Barry's proposals as old and ineffective, Barry tied his personal redemption to the redemption of the city.

=== Results ===
1994 Washington, D.C. mayoral election results
Party	Candidate	Votes	%	±%
Democratic	Marion Barry	102,884	56.02	−30.1
Republican	Carol Schwartz	76,902	41.87	+30.4
Independent	Write-in	982	0.54	
Independent	Curtis Pree	852	0.46	
DC Statehood	Jodean M. Marks	695	0.38	−0.31
Independent	Jesse Battle Jr.	488	0.27	
Independent	Faith Dane	423	0.23	+0.16
Socialist Workers	Aaron Ruby	423	0.23	+0.12
Majority		25,982	14.15	−60.5
Turnout		183,649	50.75	

== See also ==
- Electoral history of Marion Barry
