= 1986 Washington, D.C., mayoral election =

- November 6, 1986
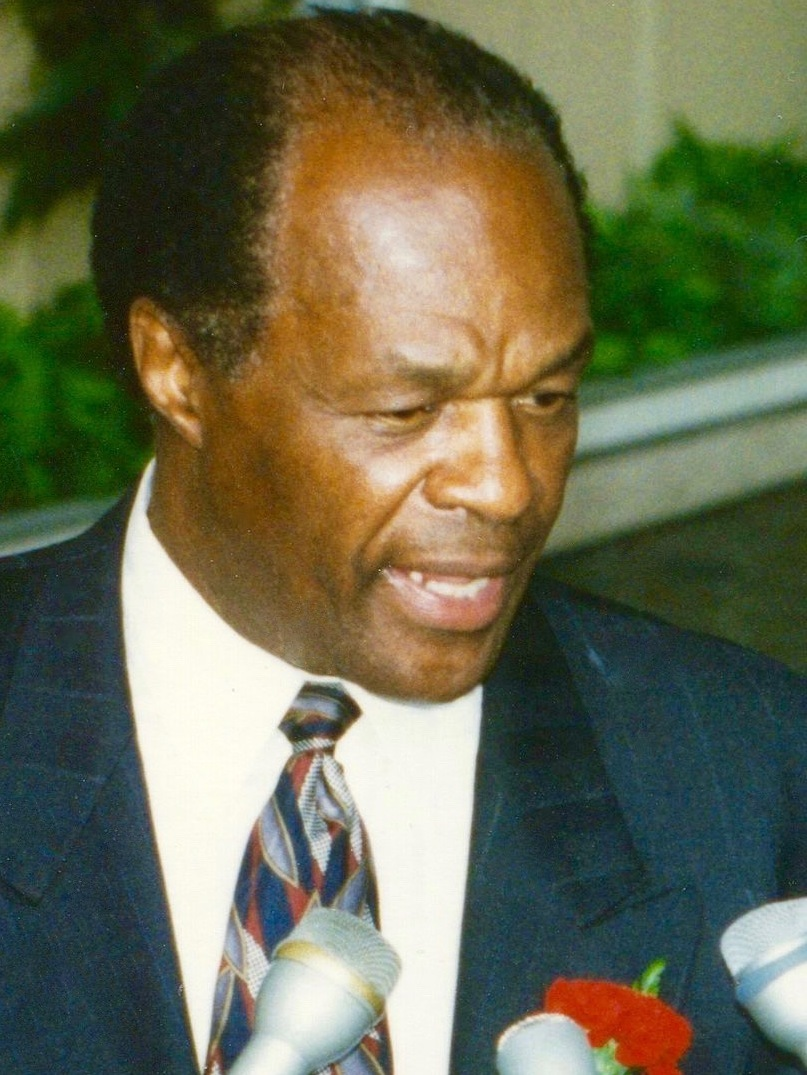

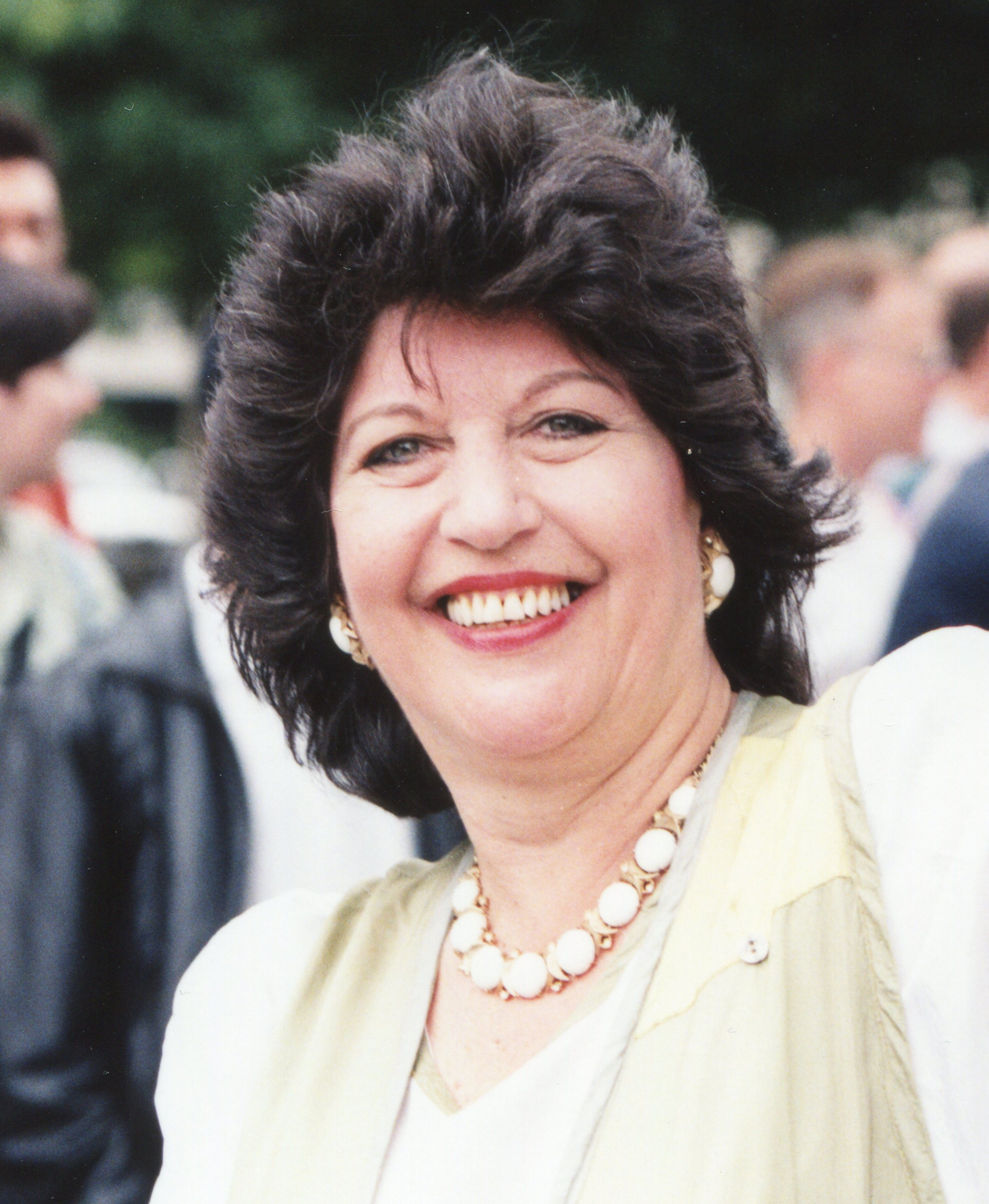
Nominee	Marion Barry	Carol Schwartz
Party	Democratic	Republican
Popular vote	79,142	42,354
Percentage	61.37%	32.84%
- Results by ward Barry: 60–70% 80–90% Schwartz: 50–60% 80–90%
Mayor before election
Marion Barry
Democratic
Elected mayor
Marion Barry
Democratic

On November 6, 1986, Washington, D.C., held an election for its mayor, with Democratic candidate and incumbent mayor Marion Barry defeating Republican candidate Carol Schwartz.

Incumbent Marion Barry sought a third term as mayor in 1986. By this time, his dominance of city politics was so absolute that he faced only token opposition in the Democratic primary in the form of former school board member Mattie Taylor, whom Barry dispatched rather easily. Barry had expected to face Jesse Jackson, who had been encouraged by colleagues to seek the mayoralty, and who had been relatively popular in stark contrast to Barry's declining reputation. Barry, who knew that most of Jackson's income came from delivering speeches, used his political clout to arbitrarily disqualify Jackson by getting a law passed that said anyone who made more than a certain amount in honoraria was ineligible to run for D.C. office. Council members jokingly called this the "Jesse Jackson law," as it was legislated expressly to keep Jackson out of the mayoral race.

As expected, he defeated Republican city councilwoman Carol Schwartz fairly handily in the November 4 general election. However, Schwartz won 33 percent of the vote—the first time a Republican had crossed the 30-percent barrier in a general election. For the third time, Barry received the endorsement of The Washington Post but "with far greater reservations and misgivings" than at any time in the past.

== Party primaries ==
=== Democratic primary ===
District of Columbia Democratic primary election, 1986
Party	Candidate	Votes	%
Democratic	Marion Barry	52,742	70.6
Democratic	Mattie Taylor	14,588	19.53
Democratic	Calvin H. Gurley	4,747	6.35
Democratic	Write-in	2,634	3.52
Total votes		74,711	100

=== DC Statehood primary ===
District of Columbia Statehood primary election, 1986
Party	Candidate	Votes	%
DC Statehood	Josephine D. Butler	245	47.39
DC Statehood	Alvin C. Frost	111	21.47
DC Statehood	Dennis S. Sobin	73	14.12
DC Statehood	Marion Barry	51	9.87
DC Statehood	Write-in	37	7.15
Total votes		517	100

== General election ==
District of Columbia mayoral election, 1986
Party	Candidate	Votes	%
Democratic	Marion Barry (incumbent)	79,142	61.37
Republican	Carol Schwartz	42,354	32.84
Independent	Brian P. Moore	3,518	2.73
DC Statehood	Josephine D. Butler	2,204	1.71
Independent	Garry Davis	585	0.46
Socialist Workers	Deborah A. Lazar	469	0.36
	Write-in	684	0.53
Total votes		128,956	100
Democratic hold			

== See also ==
- Electoral history of Marion Barry
