= Doug Levitt =

American singer-songwriter

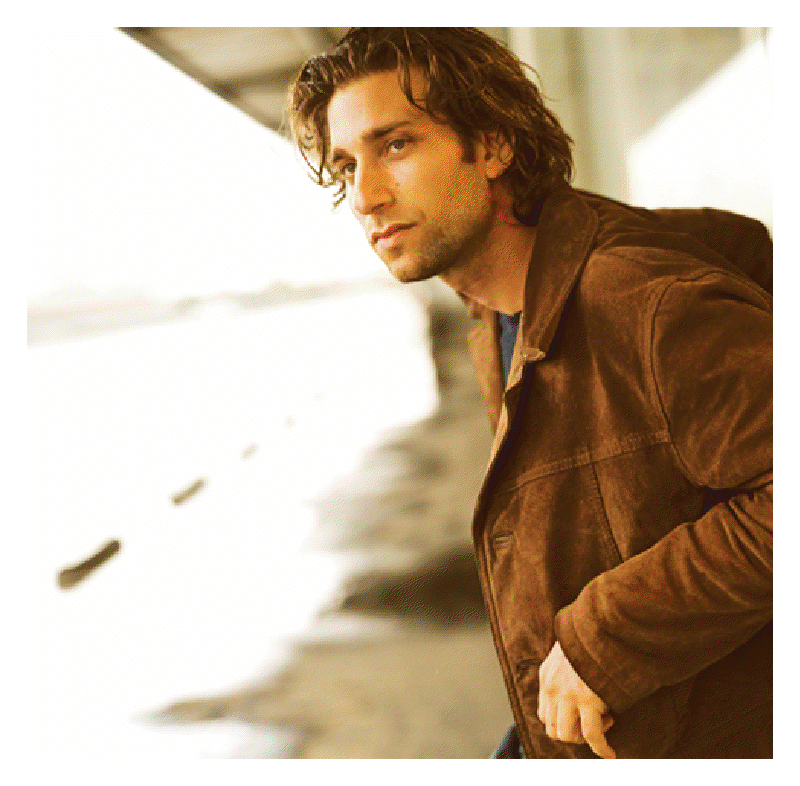
- During production of "Today" music video

Background information
- Born: 1972 (age 53–54); Washington, D.C.
- Genres: Folk-Rock, Americana, Pop
- Occupations: Singer-songwriter, writer, photographer
- Instruments: Vocals, guitar, piano
- Website: www.douglevitt.com

Doug Levitt (born 1972) is an American singer-songwriter and writer known principally for The Greyhound Diaries, a project in which he has traveled over 150,000 miles (240,000 km) via Greyhound bus since 2004, that has resulted in songs, stories and images of fellow travelers, many struggling to get by. The project, modeled on WPA-era projects that drew a fuller portrait of America, is ongoing, passing 150,000 miles (240,000 km) by 2023. Levitt has been featured by CNN, MSNBC, Fox News, The Wall Street Journal, Billboard, and Reuters. The Greyhound Diaries has resulted in two records, a one-man show, published writings, photo exhibits and a web series. Prior to embarking on his long journey, Levitt was a foreign correspondent. Based in London, he dispatched from Iran, Rwanda, and Bosnia for, among others, ABC, CNN and MSNBC.

== Personal life ==
Levitt is the youngest child of former Washington, D.C. Councilmember and mayoral candidate Carol Schwartz and husband David Schwartz. He attended the Washington, D.C. public schools, graduating from Woodrow Wilson High School. When Levitt was 16, his father committed suicide, an experience he has mentioned in interviews as instrumental in his path toward becoming an artist.

== Education ==
Levitt attended Cornell University, where he was a student of the late astrophysicist and author Carl Sagan. He later received a Fulbright Scholarship and earned his master's degree in international relations at the London School of Economics.

== Career ==
While in London, Levitt switched careers, from foreign correspondent to singer-songwriter. After moving to Nashville, Levitt worked with noted Americana producer David Henry, known for producing records for Josh Rouse, Yo La Tengo and Guster. The two began what would become a long-term collaboration on The Greyhound Diaries. Over the course of Levitt’s travels, he has captured more than 20,000 images and has performed the work at The Kennedy Center, Walter Reed Army Medical Center, the Woody Guthrie Center, the Southern Poverty Law Center, University of Southern California and homeless shelters across the country. Produced by David Henry, the recordings include the contributions of Steve Bowman, founding member of Counting Crows and Craig Wright, drummer for Steve Earle and Eric Church.
