= 1974 Washington, D.C., mayoral election =

- November 5, 1974
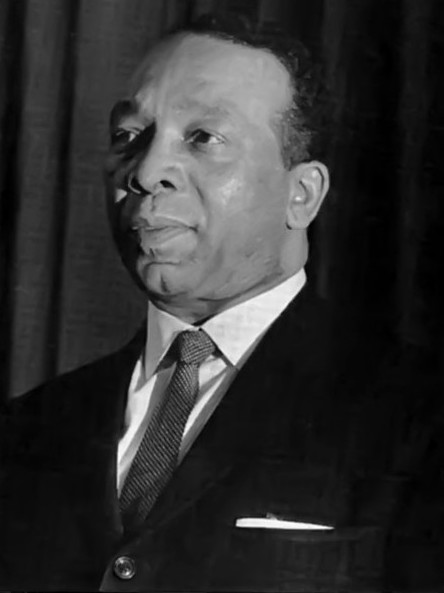

Nominee	Walter Washington	Sam Harris	Jackson R. Champion
Party	Democratic	Independent	Republican
Popular vote	84,676	7,514	3,703
Percentage	80.50%	7.14%	3.52%
Results by ward
Washington
70-80%
80-90%
Mayor before election
Walter Washington
(as Mayor-Commissioner)
Democratic
Elected mayor
Walter Washington
Democratic

Washington, D.C., held its first direct election for its mayor on November 5, 1974. It followed the passage of the District of Columbia Home Rule Act by the U.S. Congress in 1973. The election was won by Walter Washington, a Democrat. Washington won the Democratic nomination in a seven-candidate primary election in which his most significant opponent was Clifford Alexander Jr.

== Democratic primary ==
As with every mayoral election that followed, the 1974 race was at its most intense in the Democratic primary, with 90 percent of DC's voters registered as Democrats. The primary contest was a seven-person race, but the highest-profile candidates were Walter Washington (the incumbent, being the city's presidentially appointed mayor-commissioner), and Clifford Alexander Jr. (the former chairman of the Equal Employment Opportunity Commission). Washington was by far the favorite at the start of the campaign in May 1974, but tightened as the September primary drew closer. Washington won the September 10 primary, 53%-47%.

== General election ==
1974 Washington, D.C. mayoral election results
Party	Candidate	Votes	%	±%
Democratic	Walter Washington	84,676	80.50	
Independent	Sam Harris	7,514	7.14	
Republican	Jackson R. Champion	3,703	3.52	
Independent	Raymond V. Ellis	2,985	2.84	
Write in		2,843	2.70	
Socialist Workers	Nan Bailey	2,143	2.04	
Independent	Tommye Lynn Grant	1,319	1.25	
Majority		77,162	73.36	
Turnout		105,183		
