= 2002 Washington, D.C., mayoral election =

- November 5, 2002
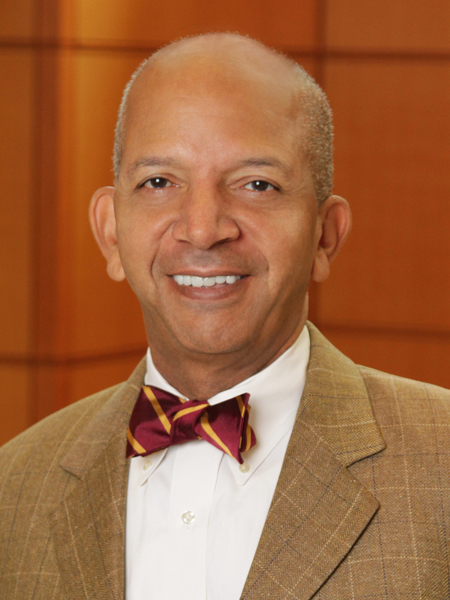

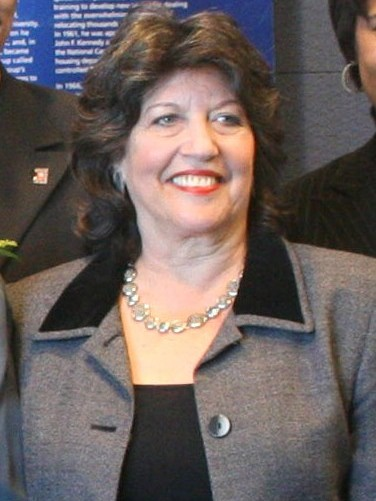
Nominee	Anthony A. Williams	Carol Schwartz
Party	Democratic	Republican
Popular vote	79,841	45,407
Percentage	60.61%	34.47%
- Results by ward Williams: 50–60% 60–70%
Mayor before election
Anthony A. Williams
Democratic
Elected mayor
Anthony A. Williams
Democratic

On November 5, 2002, Washington, D.C., held an election for its mayor, with incumbent Democratic mayor Anthony A. Williams easily defeating Carol Schwartz, the Republican nominee. Both the Democratic primary and the Republican primary elections were held on September 10, 2002. Williams not only won the Democratic primary but also received the most votes in the Republican primary. Because Washington, D.C. law prevents a candidate from being nominated by more than one party, Carol Schwartz was chosen as the Republican nominee by local party leaders.

== Party primaries ==
=== Democratic primary ===
District of Columbia Democratic primary election, 2002
Party	Candidate	Votes	%
Democratic	Anthony "Tony" Williams (incumbent)	62,714	66
Democratic	Willie F. Wilson	20,515	22
Democratic	Douglas E. Moore	5,514	6
Democratic	other write-in	3,275	3
Democratic	James Clark	1,441	2
Democratic	Faith Dane	1,084	1
Democratic	Osie L. Thorpe	301	0

=== Republican primary ===
District of Columbia Republican primary election, 2002
Party	Candidate	Votes	%
Republican	write-in	715	3,574

=== D.C. Statehood Green primary ===
District of Columbia D.C. Statehood primary election, 2002
Party	Candidate	Votes	%
DC Statehood Green	Steve Donkin	293	43
DC Statehood Green	write-in	384	57

== General election ==
District of Columbia mayoral election, 2002
Party	Candidate	Votes	%
Democratic	Anthony A. Williams (incumbent)	79,841	60.61
Republican	Carol Schwartz	45,407	34.47
DC Statehood Green	Steve Donkin	3,240	2.46
Independent	Tricia Kinch	1,150	0.87
Socialist Workers	Sam Manuel	702	0.53
Write-ins		1,382	1.05
Total votes		131,722	100.00
Democratic hold			
