= Electoral history of Marion Barry =

Elections featuring Mayor of the District of Columbia

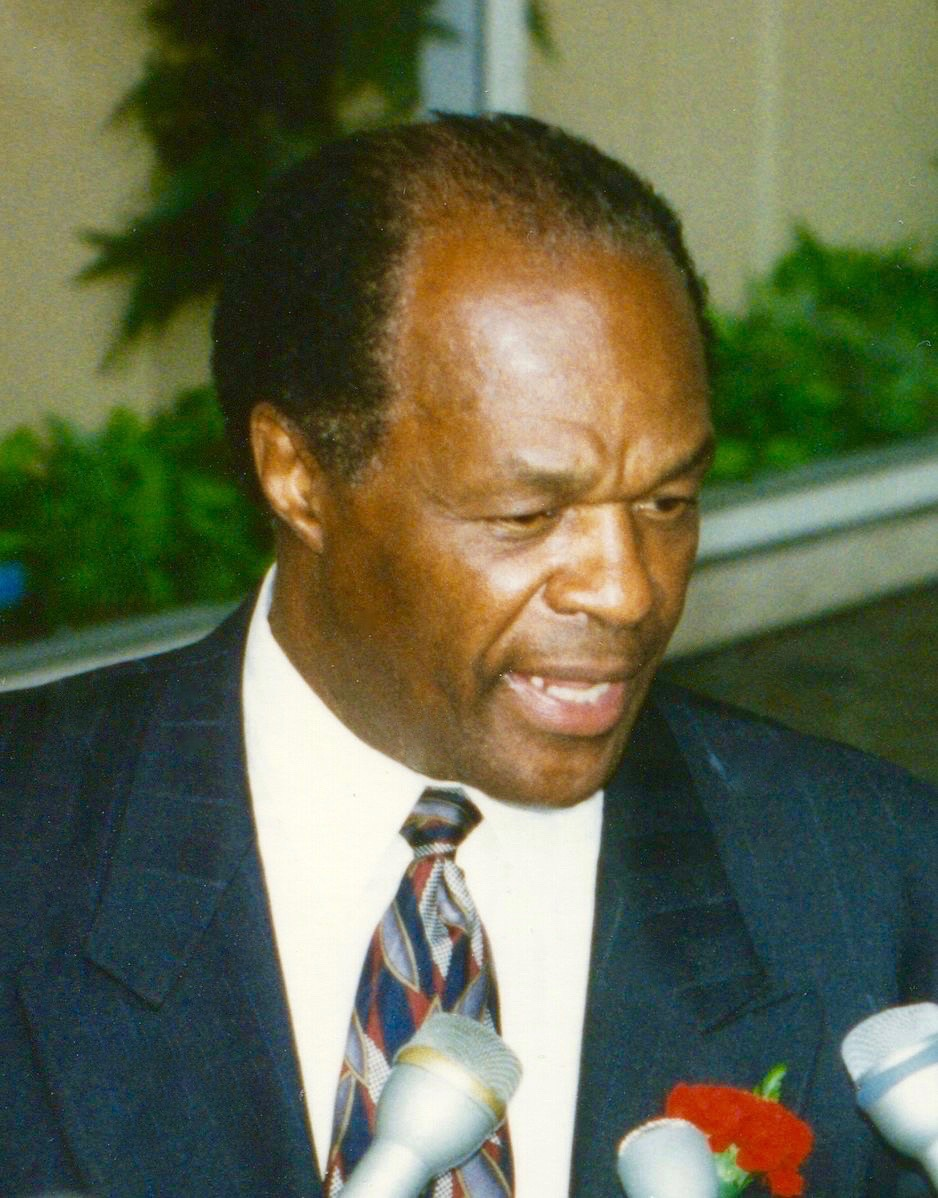
Marion Barry in 1996

The electoral history of Marion Barry:

== 1971 ==
District of Columbia Board of Education, General Election, 1971
Party	Candidate	Votes	%
Democratic	Marion Barry	24,434	58
Republican	Anita Allen	14,308	34
Independent	Ira Mosley	2,113	5
Socialist Workers	Keith Jones	989	2

== 1974 ==
Council of the District of Columbia, At-Large, Democratic Primary Election, 1974
Party	Candidate	Votes	%
Democratic	Marion Barry	35,065	25
Democratic	Douglas E. Moore	28,598	20
Democratic	Delano "Del" Lewis	22,122	16
Democratic	Ruth Hankins-Nesbitt	20,836	15
Democratic	Carl Bergman	12,018	8
Democratic	Robert L. "Bob" White	8,025	6
Democratic	Charles L. Crawford	7,535	5
Democratic	Charles "Chico" Hernandez	7,117	5
Democratic	Write-in	676	0

Council of the District of Columbia, At-Large, General Election, 1974
Party	Candidate	Votes	%
Democratic	Douglas E. Moore	55,928	17
Democratic	Marion Barry	55,615	17
DC Statehood	Julius W. Hobson, Sr.	48,708	15
Republican	Jerry A. Moore, Jr.	35,297	11
Independent	Frank Hart Rich	24,680	8
Independent	Charles I. Cassell	23,082	7
Independent	Rockwood "Adam" Foster	15,871	5
DC Statehood	Josephine (Jo) Butler	13,774	4
Independent	Ron M. Linton	12,863	4
Independent	Robert Lewis Lindsay	6,743	2
Independent	Arthur "Doc" Morris	7,710	2
Independent	James C. Shipman	6,261	2
Socialist Workers	Anne Powers	5,650	2
Socialist Workers	Sara A. Smith	4,970	2
Independent	Robert E. Pipes	4,364	1
Independent	Raymond W. Powell	4,198	1
Independent	Wilmur A. Davis	3,233	1

== 1976 ==
Council of the District of Columbia, At-Large, Democratic Primary Election, 1976
Party	Candidate	Votes	%
Democratic	Marion Barry	20,644	73
Democratic	John Martin	7,393	26
Democratic	Write-in	355	1

Council of the District of Columbia, At-Large, General Election, 1976
Party	Candidate	Votes	%
Democratic	Marion Barry (incumbent)	113,567	48
Republican	Jerry A. Moore, Jr.	57,763	24
DC Statehood	Josephine Butler	46,555	19
Independent	Dorothy Hawkinson	11,305	5
U.S. Labor	Bernard Greene	7,815	3
	Write-in	1,936	1

== 1978 ==
Mayor of the District of Columbia, Democratic Primary Election, 1978
Party	Candidate	Votes	%
Democratic	Marion Barry Jr.	32,841	35
Democratic	Sterling Tucker	31,277	33
Democratic	Walter Washington	29,881	32

Mayor of the District of Columbia, General Election, 1978
Party	Candidate	Votes	%
Democratic	Marion Barry Jr. (incumbent)	71,373	71
Republican	Arthur A. Fletcher	27,965	28

== 1982 ==
Mayor of the District of Columbia, Primary Election, 1982
Party	Candidate	Votes	%
Democratic	Marion Barry Jr.	54,638	58
Democratic	Patricia Roberts Harris	33,282	35
Democratic	John Ray	3,266	3
Democratic	Charlene Drew Jarvis	2,711	3

Mayor of the District of Columbia, General Election, 1982
Party	Candidate	Votes	%
Democratic	Marion S. Barry (incumbent)	95,007	81
Republican	E. Brooke Lee	16,501	14
Independent	Dennis S. Sobin	2,624	2
Socialist Workers	Glenn B. White	1,445	1
	Write-in	1,658	1

== 1986 ==
Mayor of the District of Columbia, Primary Election, 1986
Party	Candidate	Votes	%
Democratic	Marion Barry Jr.	52,742	71
Democratic	Mattie Goodrum Taylor	14,588	20
Democratic	Calvin Gurley	4,747	6
Democratic	Write-in	2,634	4

Mayor of the District of Columbia, General Election, 1986
Party	Candidate	Votes	%
Democratic	Marion Barry Jr. (incumbent)	80,666	61
Republican	Carol Schwartz	43,676	33
Independent	Brian Moore	3,518	3
DC Statehood Green	Josephine D. Butler	2,204	2
Independent	Garry Davis	585	0
Socialist Workers	Deborah R. Lazar	469	0
	Write-in	684	1

== 1990 ==
Council of the District of Columbia, At-Large, General Election, 1990
Party	Candidate	Votes	%
Democratic	Linda W. Cropp		38
DC Statehood	Hilda Mason		29
Independent	Marion Barry Jr.		20

== 1992 ==
Council of the District of Columbia, Ward 8, Primary Election, 1992
Party	Candidate	Votes	%
Democratic	Marion Barry Jr. (incumbent)	6,512	71
Democratic	Wilhelmina J. Rolark	1,908	21
Democratic	Ab Jordan	617	7
Democratic	Charles Chuck Dixon	170	2
Democratic	Write-in	12	0

Council of the District of Columbia, Ward 8, General Election, 1992
Party	Candidate	Votes	%
Democratic	Marion Barry Jr.	13,796	90
Independent	Richard Miller	874	6
Republican	W. Cardell Shelton	423	3
	Write in	245	2

== 1994 ==
Mayor of the District of Columbia, Democratic Primary Election, 1994
Party	Candidate	Votes	%
Democratic	Marion Barry Jr.	66,777	47
Democratic	John Ray	52.088	37
Democratic	Sharon Pratt Kelly	18,717	13
Democratic	Otis Holloman Troupe	1,897	1

Mayor of the District of Columbia, General Election, 1994
Party	Candidate	Votes	%
Democratic	Marion Barry Jr. (incumbent)	102,884	56
Republican	Carol Schwartz	76,902	42
Independent	Curtis Pree	852	0
DC Statehood	Jodean M. Marks	695	0
Independent	Jesse Battle, Jr.	488	0
Socialist Workers	Aaron Ruby	423	0
Independent	Faith	423	0
	Write-in	982	1

== 2004 ==
Council of the District of Columbia, Ward 8, Democratic Primary Election, 2004
Party	Candidate	Votes	%
Democratic	Marion Barry	5,022	58
Democratic	Sandy (Sandra) Allen	2,134	25
Democratic	William O. Lockridge	638	7
Democratic	"S.S." (Sandra Seegars)	412	5
Democratic	Jacque D. Patterson	350	4
Democratic	Joyce Scott	68	1

Council of the District of Columbia, Ward 8, General Election, 2004
Party	Candidate	Votes	%
Democratic	Marion Barry	19,333	95
Republican	Cardell Shelton	861	4

== 2008 ==
Council of the District of Columbia, Ward 8, Democratic Primary Election, 2008
Party	Candidate	Votes	%
Democratic	Marion Barry	4,359	77
Democratic	Charles Wilson	622	11
Democratic	'S.S.' Sandra Seegars	498	9
Democratic	Howard Brown	67	1
Democratic	Braxton-Jones	31	1

Council of the District of Columbia, Ward 8, General Election, 2008
Party	Candidate	Votes	%
Democratic	Marion Barry (incumbent)	24,524	92
Independent	Darrell Danny Gaston	1,137	4
Independent	Yavocka Young	1,010	4

== 2012 ==
Council of the District of Columbia, Ward 8, Primary Election, 2012
Party	Candidate	Votes	%
Democratic	Marion Barry	5,116	74
Democratic	Jacque D. Patterson	568	8
Democratic	S.S. Sandra Seegars	549	8
Democratic	Natalie Williams	485	7
Democratic	Darrell Danny Gaston	219	3

Council of the District of Columbia, Ward 8, General Election, 2012
Party	Candidate	Votes	%
Democratic	Marion Barry (incumbent)	27,202	88
Independent	Jauhar Abraham	3,588	12
