= Carol Schwartz =

American politician (born 1944)

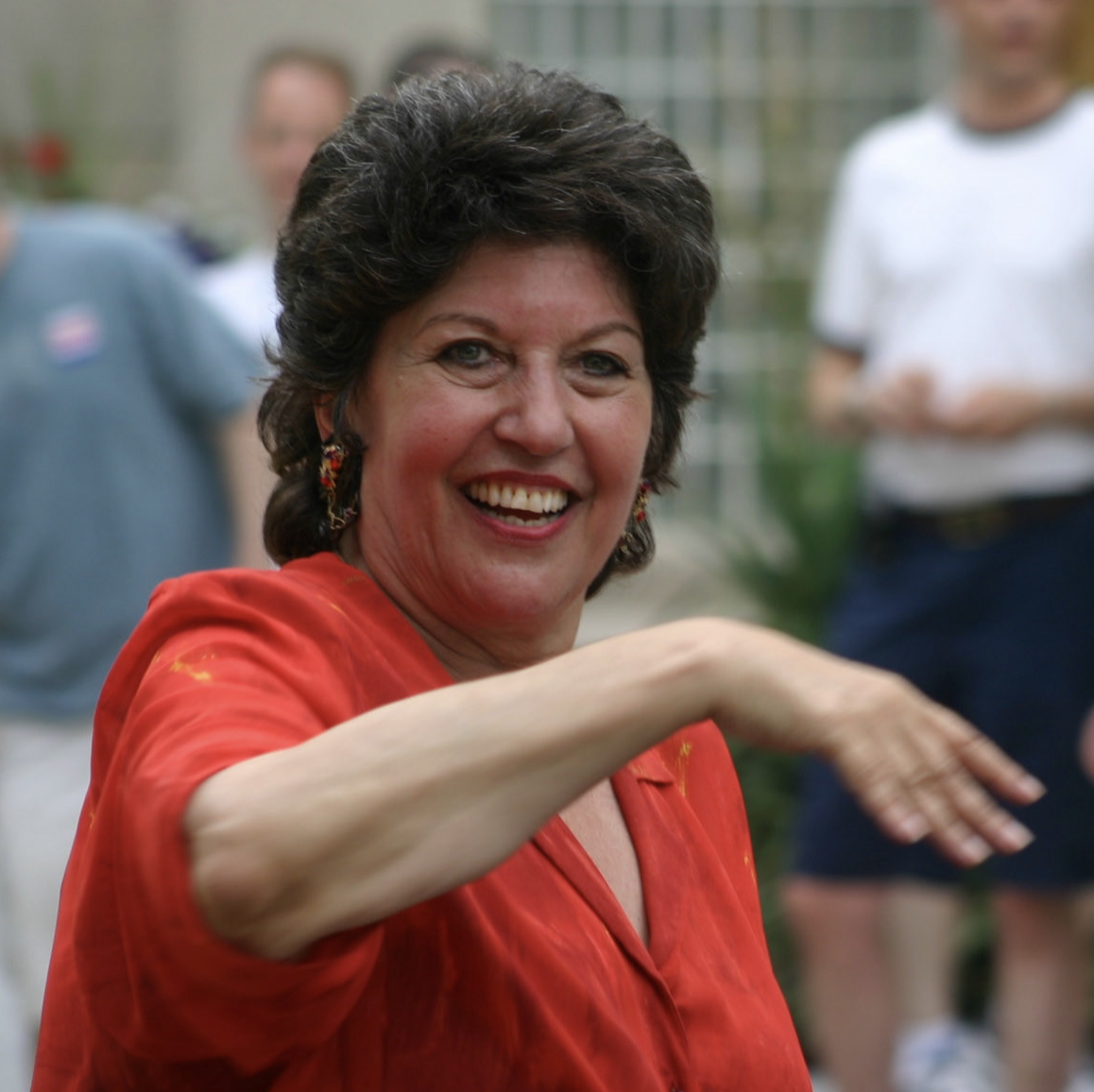
- Schwartz in 2005

Member of the Council of the District of Columbia from the at-large district
- In office January 2, 1997 – January 2, 2009
- Preceded by: William Lightfoot
- Succeeded by: Michael Brown
- In office January 2, 1985 – January 2, 1989
- Preceded by: Jerry A. Moore Jr.
- Succeeded by: William Lightfoot

Personal details
- Born: January 20, 1944 (age 82) Greenville, Mississippi, U.S.
- Party: Republican (before 2014); Independent (2014–present)
- Spouse: David Schwartz (died 1988)
- Children: 3, including Doug
- Education: University of Texas, Austin (BA)

Carol Schwartz (born January 20, 1944) is an American politician and perennial candidate from Washington, D.C., who served as a Republican at-large member on the Council of the District of Columbia from 1985 to 1989 and again from 1997 to 2009. A five-time perennial candidate for mayor, she is the only Republican nominee since the restoration of home rule to garner more than 30 percent of the vote. She announced her fifth campaign for mayor on June 9, 2014 finishing behind Muriel Bowser and David Catania. In 2015, she was appointed to the D.C. Board of Ethics and Government Accountability by Mayor Muriel Bowser.

== Early life ==
Carol Schwartz was born on January 20, 1944 in Greenville, Mississippi. Schwartz lived with her family for brief periods in Oak Ridge, Tennessee, and Oklahoma City, Oklahoma, before settling down in Midland, Texas, where she spent nearly all of her childhood. Growing up in Midland, Schwartz experienced anti-Semitism as a child, where she was one of very few Jewish people in the city. Schwartz graduated from the University of Texas at Austin in 1965 with a degree in elementary and special education. After graduation, she worked as a special education teacher in Austin, but she quit and moved to the District in 1966 after visiting the city.

== Political career ==
=== 1974–1988 ===
Schwartz entered D.C. politics in 1974 as a member of the Board of Education representing Ward 3. Reelected four years later, she unsuccessfully ran for president of the Board of Education in 1980.

In 1984 she ran for the City Council as an at-large member. She ran against Jerry A. Moore, Jr., who had held the seat for ten years and who was also a Republican. After Schwartz defeated Moore in the Republican primary, Moore decided to run a write-in campaign in the general election, but Schwartz won the general election as well.

In 1986, Schwartz ran for mayor against two-term incumbent Marion Barry. She campaigned primarily on providing better basic services, arguing that "there is no Republican or Democratic way to pick up the trash." She lost, tallying 33 percent of the vote. In an interview in 1994, Schwartz said the results exceeded her expectations; she had only expected to receive 10 percent of the vote running against Barry. Indeed, before Schwartz's bid, no Republican mayoral candidate had crossed the 30 percent mark. She decided not to run for reelection to the council after the 1988 suicide of her husband, real estate lawyer David H. Schwartz, which occurred on her birthday.

=== 1994–1998 ===
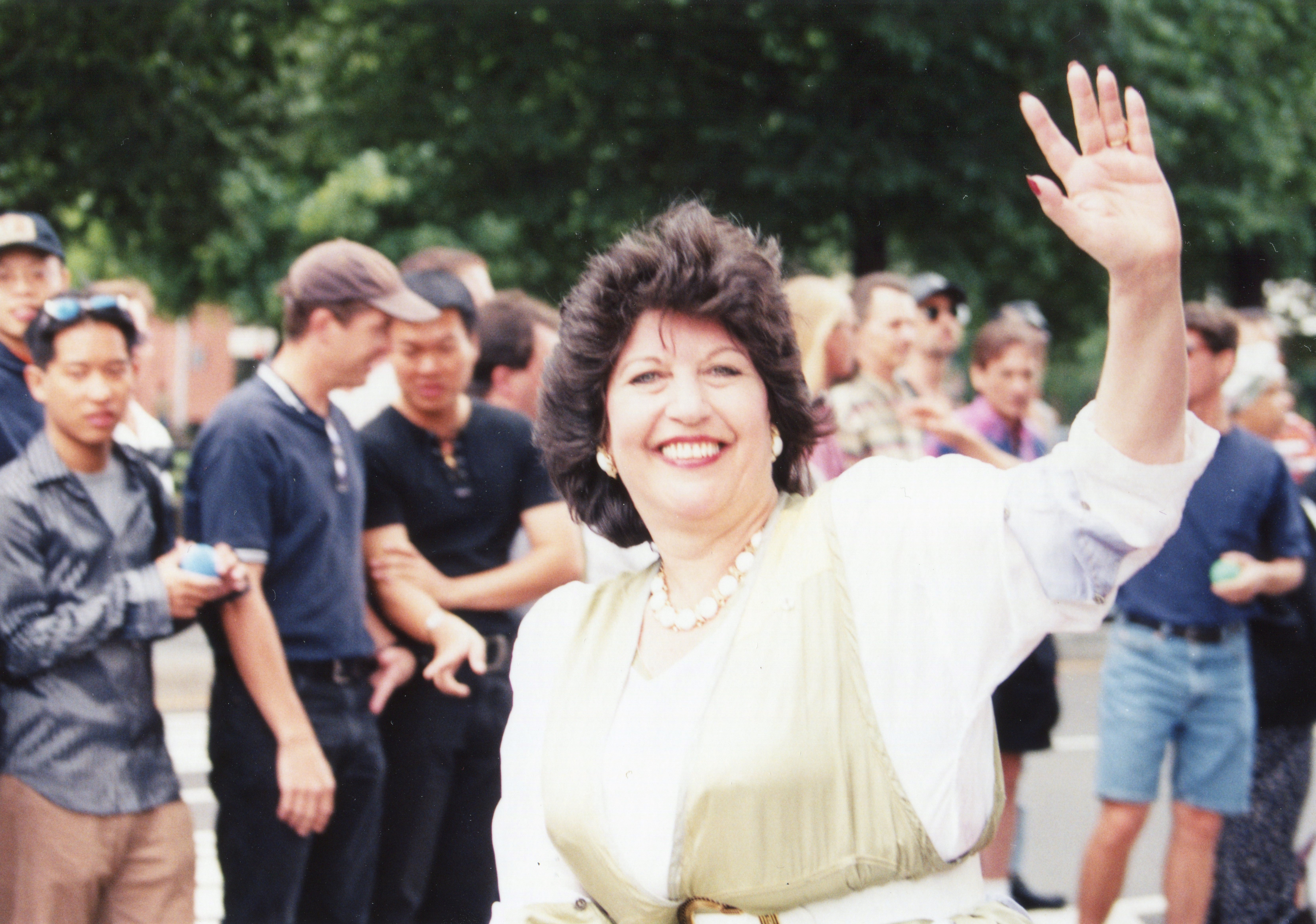
Schwartz at the 1998 Capital Pride Parade

Schwartz reentered politics in 1994, running again for mayor. Marion Barry also reentered politics that year, defeating incumbent mayor Sharon Pratt Kelly in the Democratic primary election. Although Schwartz lost to Barry, she did tally 42 percent of the vote—easily the strongest showing by a Republican mayoral candidate since the restoration of home rule in 1974.

In 1996, Schwartz ran for an at-large seat in the council. The only Republican on the ballot, she won the race and rejoined the council.

In 1998, Schwartz ran for mayor for the third time, campaigning for "safe streets, good schools, a clean environment." She lost to Democrat Anthony A. Williams, tallying 30 percent of the vote. She successfully ran for reelection to the Council in 2000.

Schwartz opposed term limits for elected officials. In 2001, Schwartz voted for legislation that overturned the results of a popular referendum limiting members of the D.C. Council to two terms.

=== 2002–2005 ===
In 2002, Schwartz decided not to run officially in the Republican primary for mayor, but said she would consider running in general election if she won the write-in vote in the primary election. Schwartz attacked Williams' record as mayor, saying that his "stewardship has been marred by ethical lapses, questionable judgment and a cold lack of compassion for our poorest and most helpless citizens." With no individual's name on the ballot for mayor in the Republican primary, Republican voters could only write-in a candidate's name for mayor. Williams was forced into a write-in campaign in the Democratic primary after many of his petitions to run on the Democratic ballot were found to be invalid. Williams ended up winning not only the Democratic primary as a write-in candidate, but he also won the Republican primary as a write-in candidate, receiving 1,707 votes compared to Schwartz's 999. The District of Columbia Board of Elections and Ethics declared Williams the winner of the Democratic primary, but it also declared that there was no winner in the Republican primary. The Board allowed the Republican committee to choose a Republican nominee for mayor in the general election, and the committee chose Schwartz. Schwartz accepted the Republican nomination, officially entering the election for mayor for the fourth time. Schwartz received 34% of the vote in the general election while Williams received 61%.

In 2004, Schwartz successfully ran for reelection to the council.

In 2005, to mock supporters of the proposed smoking ban in D.C. bars, she introduced legislation to "ban the sale of alcohol in all bars, restaurants and nightclubs", arguing that alcohol, like cigarettes, is unhealthy. Schwartz, a 40-year smoker who kicked the habit in 2001, explained her position by telling The Washington Post: "I like freedom of choice about abortion and nude dancing – consenting adults should have choices." Instead of prohibiting smoking in all restaurants and bars, Schwartz favored giving tax credits to those establishments that voluntarily prohibit smoking on their premises.

=== 2007–2008 ===
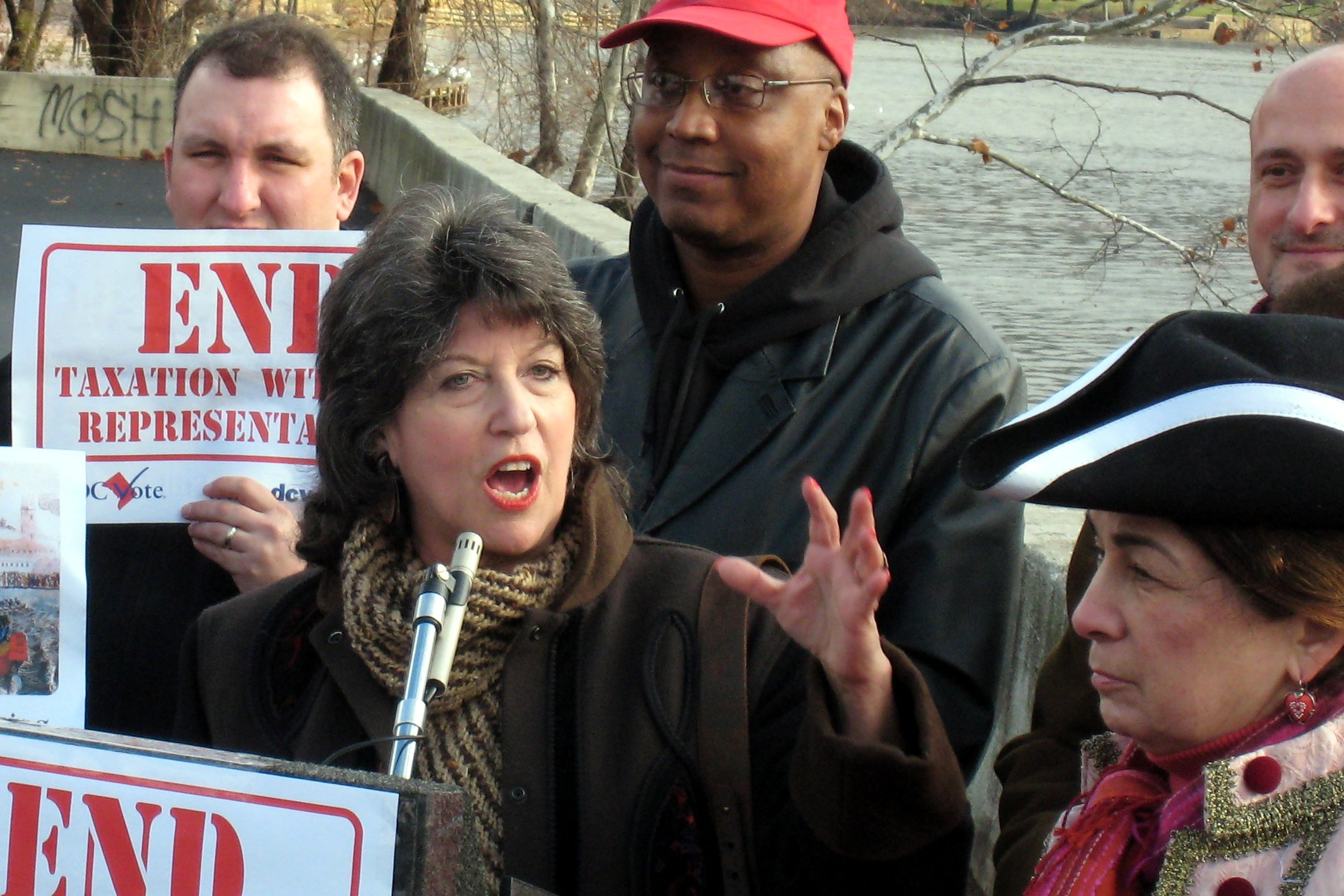
Carol Schwartz speaks at a voting rights rally in Georgetown, on December 16, 2007, the anniversary of the Boston Tea Party.

In 2007 and 2008, Schwartz shepherded the Accrued Sick and Safe Leave Act through the council. The law, which was adopted in March 2008, requires District employers to give their workers paid time off to address their health needs or those of a family member. The bill faced significant opposition from the District's business community, as well as from several of Schwartz's colleagues on the council. The law made the District the second jurisdiction in the U.S. to create a mandated sick leave requirement, following San Francisco. The D.C. law represents the first time a paid sick days requirement was adopted by a city- or state-level legislative body in the U.S.; the San Francisco law was adopted as a ballot initiative. The D.C. law also represents the first law to require employers to offer time paid time off to victims of stalking, sexual assault, or domestic violence who need time off to seek medical care, shelter, counseling, a court order, or other services related to the domestic violence. The San Francisco law does not require paid leave for this purpose.

==== 2008 reelection campaign ====
Schwartz ran for reelection to the Council in 2008. Patrick Mara, a government relations consultant, ran against her in the Republican primary election.

Mara depicted Schwartz as "not representative of core urban Republican values." He did not consider her a fiscal conservative, saying that Schwartz "did nothing to halt a 51 percent increase in the D.C. budget in four years." In response, Schwartz noted another council member who voted for the budget increases was David Catania, whom Mara has said he admires.

The D.C. Republican Party endorsed Schwartz in the primary. The Service Employees International Union Local 722 also endorsed Schwartz. The Washington Post endorsed Mara. The business community strongly supported Mara. The Greater Washington Board of Trade and the D.C. Chamber of Commerce PAC both endorsed Mara and raised money for his campaign.

According to unofficial results released on September 10, Mara had received 60 percent of votes, while Schwartz received 40 percent. On September 15, Schwartz announced that she would run as a write-in candidate in the general election. Endorsements in the general election were varied. The D.C. Republican party, Log Cabin Republicans of D.C., and the Greater Washington Board of Trade all supported Mara. The editorial board of The Washington Post published an endorsement of both Mara and incumbent Democrat Kwame Brown. The Fraternal Order of Police has endorsed Schwartz. Service Employees International Union Local 722, the political action committee of the Hotel Association of Washington, and the news editor of The Georgetown Voice supported Michael Brown. Among sitting council members, Jim Graham, Muriel Bowser, and Phil Mendelson endorsed Schwartz. Vincent Gray, Harry Thomas, Jr., David Catania, and Marion Barry endorsed Michael Brown.

In the general election, Mara was on the ballot with four other candidates. Three candidates, all formerly registered as Democrats, were listed as independents on the ballot: lobbyist Michael Brown, ANC commissioner Dee Hunter, and Mark H. Long. Kwame Brown received 48 percent of votes, earning him reelection to the council, and Michael Brown received 20 percent, giving him the seat formerly occupied by Schwartz. In third place, write-in votes, including votes for Schwartz, comprised 11 percent.

== Ideology ==
Schwartz is a moderate Republican; fiscally conservative and socially liberal. She opposes redirecting public money toward private and religious school through school vouchers and supports allowing smoking and nude dancing in bars. A fiscal conservative, she supports reducing taxes and smaller government budgets. She has blocked legislation requiring large retailers to pay a higher minimum wage to their employees.

Schwartz supports abortion rights and has been supportive of some gay rights causes. In 2004, Schwartz announced her support of domestic partnerships, but she opposed instituting same-sex marriage in Washington as of 2008. She said her opposition stems not from her opposition to same-sex marriage, but her belief that it would engender a backlash from Congress. Schwartz believed that Congress would quickly repeal the law and seek to overturn pro-gay legislation in the District, such as the domestic partnership registry and gay adoption law. She said she probably would have voted in favor of a bill to establish same-sex marriage in the District if she were certain Congress would allow it. Schwartz has voted for legislation prohibiting insurance companies from discriminating against people with AIDS. Schwartz is opposed to including former criminals as protected classes in the District's human rights law, saying that jewelry stores should have the right not to hire convicted jewel thieves.

Schwartz also opposed the extension of the District's youth curfew in 2007. Schwartz voted in favor of the Accrued Sick and Safe Leave Act, which requires District employers to give their employees paid sick leave. Schwartz is in favor of instituting capital punishment.

While Schwartz supports giving the District full representation in Congress and full control over its own affairs, she does not favor statehood for the District, saying, "Statehood would be cutting off our nose to spite our face. We shouldn't give up our unique status as the national capital."

Schwartz endorsed Joe Biden for president during the 2020 US Presidential Election.

== Personal life ==
She was married to David Schwartz. They have two daughters and one son. All her children attended and graduated from District of Columbia Public Schools. Schwartz's son is singer-songwriter Doug Levitt. David committed suicide on January 20, 1988, his wife's 44th birthday.

Schwartz's autobiography, Quite a Life! From Defeat to Defeat... And Back, was published in 2017.

== Election history ==
1986 Mayor of the District of Columbia, General Election

Marion Barry Jr. (D) 61%
Carol Schwartz (R) 33%
other 6%

1994 Mayor of the District of Columbia, Republican Primary Election

Carol Schwartz (R) 75%
Brian Patrick Moore (R) 13%
Write-in 12%

1994 Mayor of the District of Columbia, General Election

Marion Barry Jr. (D) 56%
Carol Schwartz (R) 42%
Curtis Pree (I) 0%
Jodean M. Marks (STG) 0%
Jesse Battle, Jr. (I) 0%
Faith (I) 0%
Aaron Ruby (I) 0%
Write-in 1%

1996 Council of the District of Columbia, At Large, Republican Primary Election

Carol Schwartz (R) 96%
Write-in 4%

1996 Council of the District of Columbia, At Large, General Election

Harold Brazil (D) 43%
Carol Schwartz (R) 29%
Sam Jordan (STG) 7%
Mark Thompson (Umoja) 6%
Valencia Mohammed (I) 6%
James Baxter (I) 5%
Robert Hamilton Jr. (I) 1%
Ernest (Ernie) Brooks (I) 1%
Don Folden Sr. (I) 1%
Write-in 0%

1998 Mayor of the District of Columbia, Republican Primary Election

Carol Schwartz (R) 89%
Write-in 12%

1998 Mayor of the District of Columbia, General Election

Anthony "Tony" Williams (D) 66%
Carol Schwartz (R) 30%
John Gloster (STG) 2%
Alpha Brown (I) 0%
Brian P. Moore (I) 0%
Faith (I) 0%
Sam Manuel (SWP) 0%
Albert Ceccone (I) 0%
Write-in 0%

2000 Council of the District of Columbia, At Large, Republican Primary Election

Carol Schwartz (R) 97%
Write-in 3%

2000 Council of the District of Columbia, At Large, General Election

Harold Brazil (D) 51%
Carol Schwartz (R) 29%
Arturo Griffiths (STG) 11%
Daphne M. McBryde (I) 4%
Chris Ray (I) 2%
Matthew G. Mercurio (LIB) 2%
Write-in 0%

2002 Mayor of the District of Columbia, General Election

Anthony "Tony" Williams (D) 61%
Carol Schwartz (R) 34%
Steve Donkin (STG) 2%
Tricia Kinch (I) 1%
Sam Manuel (SWP) 1%
Write-in 1%

2004 Council of the District of Columbia, At Large, Republican Primary Election

Carol Schwartz (R) 83%
Robert Pittman (R) 11%
Don Folden, Sr. (R) 3%
Write-in 3%

2004 Council of the District of Columbia, At Large, General Election

Kwame R. Brown (D) 55%
Carol Schwartz (R) 31%
Laurent Ross (STG) 8%
A.D. "Tony" Dominguez (I) 5%
Write-in 1%

2008 Council of the District of Columbia, At Large, Republican Primary Election

Patrick Mara (R) 59%
Carol Schwartz (R) 41%
Write-in <1%

2008 Council of the District of Columbia, At Large, General Election Certified Results

Kwame R. Brown (D) 48%
Michael A. Brown (D) 20%
Write-in, including Carol Schwartz (R) 11%
Patrick Mara (R) 10%
David Schwartzman (STG) 5%
Mark H. Long (I) 4%
Dee Hunter (I) 2%

2014 Mayor of the District of Columbia, General Election

Muriel E. Bowser (D) 55%
David A. Catania (I) 35%
Carol Schwartz (I) 7%
Faith (STG) 1%
Bruce Majors (L) 1%
Nestor Djonkam (I) <1%
Write-in 1%

Party political offices
Preceded by Brooke Lee	Republican nominee for Mayor of the District of Columbia; 1986	Succeeded by Maurice Turner
Preceded by Maurice Turner	Republican nominee for Mayor of the District of Columbia; 1994, 1998, 2002	Succeeded by David Kranich
