= Anthony A. Williams =

Mayor of the District Columbia from 1999 to 2007

Tony Williams
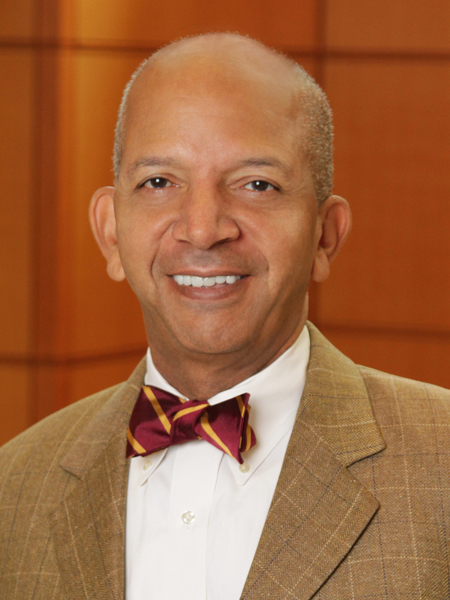

5th Mayor of the District of Columbia
- In office January 2, 1999 – January 2, 2007
- Preceded by: Marion Barry
- Succeeded by: Adrian Fenty

79th President of the National League of Cities
- In office 2005
- Preceded by: Charles Lyons
- Succeeded by: James Hunt

Personal details
- Born: Anthony Stephen Eggleton; July 28, 1951 (age 75) Los Angeles, California, U.S.
- Party: Democratic
- Spouse: Diane Simmons
- Children: 1
- Education: Santa Clara University (attended); U.S. Air Force Academy Preparatory School (attended); Yale University (BA); Harvard University (MPP, JD)
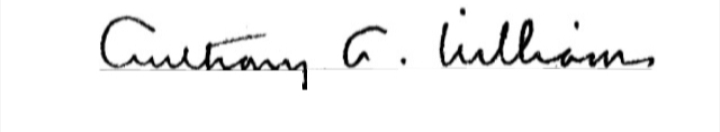
- Signature

Military service
- Allegiance: United States
- Branch/service: United States Air Force
- Years of service: 1971–1974
- Unit: 93rd Bombardment Group

Anthony Allen Williams (born Anthony Stephen Eggleton; July 28, 1951) is an American politician who was the mayor of the District of Columbia for two terms, serving from 1999 to 2007. Williams was first elected in the 1998 mayoral election, and was reelected in 2002.

Williams was previously chief financial officer for the district, managing to balance the budget and achieve a surplus within two years of appointment. A Democrat, he held a variety of executive posts in cities and states around the country prior to his service in the D.C. government. Since 2012, he has been chief executive officer/executive director of the Federal City Council, a nonprofit that promotes economic development in Washington, D.C. .

== Early life, education and military service ==
Williams, born Anthony Stephen Eggleton in Los Angeles on July 28, 1951, was adopted at age three by Virginia and Lewis Williams (a postal worker), who raised him and seven other children in their home: Lewis IV, Virginia II, Carla, Cynthia, Leif Eric I, Kimberly, and Loris. Williams grew up in the West Adams area of Los Angeles. He attended Loyola High School in Los Angeles.

Williams attended Santa Clara University, where he became active in the anti-Vietnam War movement and became president of his sophomore class. Eventually, his academic performance suffered and he left school.

Shortly thereafter he joined the Air Force. He volunteered for Vietnam, but was kept in the country to work as an aide in the 354th Tactical Fighter Wing command post. He sought an appointment to the United States Air Force Academy but was instead sent to the academy's preparatory school because of his poor grades at Santa Clara. He excelled and earned an appointment to the academy. Instead Williams sought to leave the Air Force as a conscientious objector, and was given an honorable discharge in 1974. After that, he worked giving piano and clay sculpture and other tactile art lessons to blind children and counseling Vietnam War veterans in Los Angeles. In 1975, he enrolled at Yale using his veteran's benefits to help pay the bill. He left school to start a map business that failed and returned in 1979. In 1982, he graduated magna cum laude with a Bachelor of Arts in Political Science from Yale College, where he was a member of the literary society St. Anthony Hall. In 1987, he earned a J.D. from Harvard Law School and a Master of Public Policy from the John F. Kennedy School of Government at Harvard University.

== Career ==
Williams was the Deputy State Comptroller of Connecticut. Williams also was executive director of the Community Development Agency in St. Louis, Missouri; assistant director of the Boston (MA) Redevelopment Authority; and adjunct professor at Columbia University.

Williams was appointed by President Bill Clinton and confirmed by the United States Senate as the first CFO for the US Department of Agriculture, as well as a founder and Vice Chairman of the U.S. CFO Council.

=== Politics ===
Williams first ran for office while a student at Yale in 1979 when he was elected to the New Haven, Connecticut, Board of Aldermen. He served until 1982 and during that time was President Pro-Tempore.

Williams first rose to prominence in Washington, D.C., as the District of Columbia's Chief Financial Officer (CFO) during the final term of Mayor Marion Barry, who nominated Williams to the position in September 1995. By that time, however, Washington was in the midst of a fiscal crisis of such proportion that Congress had established a financial control board charged with oversight and management of the District's finances. The same legislation had created the position of Chief Financial Officer, which had direct control over day-to-day financial operations of each city agency, and independence from the mayor's office; while Barry had the authority to appoint Williams, only the Control Board had the authority to fire him. This gave Williams an unusual level of political strength in dealings with the mayor, with whom he had a number of very public battles; Williams, who had the support of the Control Board as well as Congress, tended to win these battles, even gaining power in 1996 to hire and fire all budget-related city staffers. Given this political clout, Williams began steering D.C.'s finances toward financial recovery, moving from a $355 million deficit at the end of 1995 to a $185 million surplus in the city's fiscal year 1997.

Williams' financial successes in the District made him a popular figure. In January 1998, local media reported that Williams was considering a run for mayor in that year's election; he quickly dismissed the notion, but a "Draft Anthony Williams" movement began building nonetheless. When Barry declined to seek a fifth term as mayor in the spring of 1998, Williams finally entered the race, resigning as CFO to campaign. Williams instantly assumed frontrunner status in the race, and in September won the D.C. Democratic primary with 50% of the vote in a six-person race, then won the November 3 general election by a 2–1 margin despite not having held any elected office since 1982. Upon his election, the Control Board announced that it would begin ceding back to Williams much of the executive authority it had stripped of the mayor's office during Barry's tenure.

==== Mayor first term ====
During his first term he restored the city to the financial black, running budget surpluses every year and allowing the control board to terminate itself two years ahead of schedule. He brought some $40 billion of investment to the city. Unprecedented capital investments and service improvements also came to some disadvantaged neighborhoods under Williams' administration. Controversially, Williams accepted the resignation of aide David Howard, a former Williams campaign worker who handled citizen complaints for the mayor’s office, for using the word "niggardly".

By 2001, real property values were climbing steadily and Washington, D.C., was experiencing a real estate investment boom in the residential, commercial and retail markets. Congress dissolved the Financial Control Board in September 2001. In 2002 the Association of Foreign Investors in Real Estate (AFIRE) named Washington, D.C., the top global and U.S. city for real estate investment. (It made the top slot again in 2003 and 2004.)

Williams also alienated some lower-income residents. His first term in office was marked by the beginning of a period of gentrification throughout the city. Longtime residents complained of being priced out of their homes and neighborhoods and forced to move to neighboring Prince George's County, Maryland. In addition, one of Williams' budget-trimming measures was the closure of inpatient services at D.C. General Hospital, the only public hospital in the District. The D.C. Council voted down Williams' proposed closure in the spring of 2001, but their decision was overturned by the Control Board soon afterwards.

==== Mayor second term ====
In 2002, Williams ran for re-election and stumbled into a political scandal. The firm which he hired to collect signatures to put his name on the Democratic Primary ballot had irregularities with hundreds of names on the petitions. As a result of the irregular petitions, the Williams campaign was fined $277,700 by the District of Columbia Board of Elections and Ethics and his name was removed from the Democratic Primary ballot. He was forced to run as a write-in candidate. His chief opponent, minister Willie Wilson, also ran as a write-in candidate. Despite this handicap, Williams won both the Democratic and Republican primaries as a write-in candidate and went on to be re-elected in the general election.

During his second term, Williams continued his record of stabilizing the finances of the District. The city was able to balance its budget for ten consecutive years between the 1997 and 2006 fiscal years; the cumulative fund balance swung from a deficit of $518 million in the 1996 fiscal year to a surplus of nearly $1.6 billion in the 2005 fiscal year. During this same period, the District's bond ratings went from "junk bond" status to "A" category by all three major rating agencies.

Williams was instrumental in arranging a deal to move the financially ailing Montreal Expos, a Major League Baseball (MLB) team, to Washington, D.C. Although he faced opposition from much of the D.C. Council, Williams eventually prevailed. In late December 2004, the Council approved by one vote a financing plan for a new stadium. The new team, the Washington Nationals, began playing in April 2005, the first time since 1971 that the nation's capital had its own MLB team.

While in office, Williams was elected president of the National League of Cities in December 2004. In January 2005, he was elected Vice Chair of the Metropolitan Washington Council of Governments (COG).

Williams was not without detractors. His international traveling was criticized, as was his failure to purchase a home in D.C., despite his aggressive publicity campaign to convince residents to buy homes in the city. Some of his constituents and members of the D.C. Council (including his successor, Adrian M. Fenty) criticized Williams' deal with Major League Baseball for conceding too much and not providing a spending cap on the public financing of the new baseball park.

Williams was the first sitting mayor of Washington since 1973 to participate in a Presidential funeral in 2004, when he spoke at Ronald Reagan's funeral, held at Washington National Cathedral. His final speech as mayor would also come at the Cathedral in 2006.

On September 28, 2005, Williams announced he would not seek re-election in 2006. Williams endorsed Council Chair Linda W. Cropp as a successor; however, Cropp lost to Ward 4 Councilmember Adrian Fenty in the Democratic primary. Fenty went on to win the general election.

=== Career after politics ===
In 2018, Williams was campaign co-chair for S. Kathryn Allen, a former insurance executive seeking an at-large seat on the Council held by Elissa Silverman. An investigation determined that more than half of Allen's signatures were fraudulently collected and her name was not included on the ballot. Williams did not comment publicly about the incident.

== Legacy and honors ==
Williams was generally seen as a moderate; he had good relations with Congress and the White House, business and labor, and the community and region. Unlike many Democrats, he said he was "open" to Republican U.S. Senator Sam Brownback's proposal to implement a flat tax in D.C., and he supported school vouchers. His public persona is that of an intellectual bureaucrat, especially when compared to the colorful Barry. He is known for his signature bow tie.

In 1997, Governing Magazine named him "Public Official of the Year".

Driven by a growth in local revenues, income and sales taxes, Williams managed District resources to improve services, lower tax rates, improve the performance of city agencies and invest in infrastructure and human services. This dramatic turnaround required transformational improvements in cash management, budget execution, and revenue collections. After many years of declining population, the District has had a steady growth in population. In its July 2004 issue, Black Enterprise magazine selected Washington, D.C., as the second-best city in the country for African Americans to live and work in because of its housing, jobs, health care and economic development.

Under Williams' administration, the District's crime rate dropped dramatically. By the end of his tenure, hotels reported 2% vacancy rates. Real estate values in the District remained high despite regional and national trends in the opposite direction.

On the eve of Williams' last day in office in 2006, The Washington Post columnist Colbert I. King wrote,

Williams leaves in his wake a city with a good bond rating, sizable cash reserves, a more accessible health-care system for the underserved, several promising neighborhood projects, a major league baseball team, a new stadium under construction and a home town that is no longer the laughingstock of the nation ... On his watch, the District underwent its most profound transformation in generations. Williams promoted an investment climate that led to the sprucing up of a city that had gone to seed.

Williams is credited with laying the foundations for continued improvement by the city. His final day in office coincided with the Washington funeral of Gerald Ford.

== Personal life ==
In 1999, journalist Gene Weingarten interviewed Williams and wrote a feature article titled "A Funny Thing About the Mayor ... He's Funny" published in The Washington Post's Style Section. In October 2016, after bumping into Williams when both men were called for jury duty, Weingarten wrote in an online chat that Williams "had shown a side of himself absolutely no one knew, a sense of humor so shrewd and adroit he was way ahead of me the whole time." He went on to describe Williams as "an incredibly, organically, wryly funny man who has turned self deprecation into an art form. He also believes deeply in civic responsibility."

In January 2007, Williams entered into a partnership with the Washington-area investment bank Friedman Billings Ramsey Group, Inc. to form Primum Public Realty Trust, a real estate investment trust (REIT) focused on buying and leasing back government and not-for-profit real estate. In 2009 Williams announced he was stepping down as CEO and that Primum would be dissolved. He joined D.C. law firm Arent Fox on May 14, 2009, as Director of State and Local Practice, assisting governments and municipalities with securing stimulus money and managing their budgets.

Williams has also been actively involved in local education initiatives, including on the boards of the nonprofit organizations D.C. Children First and the national nonprofit Alliance for School Choice.

In March 2008, Williams made headlines by purchasing a home in D.C., a condominium on the city's revitalizing H Street NE corridor.

Williams was a member of the Debt Reduction Task Force at the Bipartisan Policy Center. In 2012, Williams joined the board of directors of the Bank of Georgetown.

In April 2012, Williams was appointed the chief executive officer/executive director of the Federal City Council. The private organization, founded in 1954, is a group of business, civic, educational, and other leaders interested in promoting economic development and livability in Washington, D.C. It is considered one of the most influential groups in the city.

Williams is Catholic.

Party political offices
Preceded by Marion Barry	Democratic nominee for Mayor of the District of Columbia; 1998, 2002	Succeeded by Adrian Fenty
Political offices
Preceded by Marion Barry	Mayor of the District of Columbia; 1999–2007	Succeeded by Adrian Fenty
