= Marion Barry =

Mayor of the District of Columbia (1979–1991; 1995–1999)

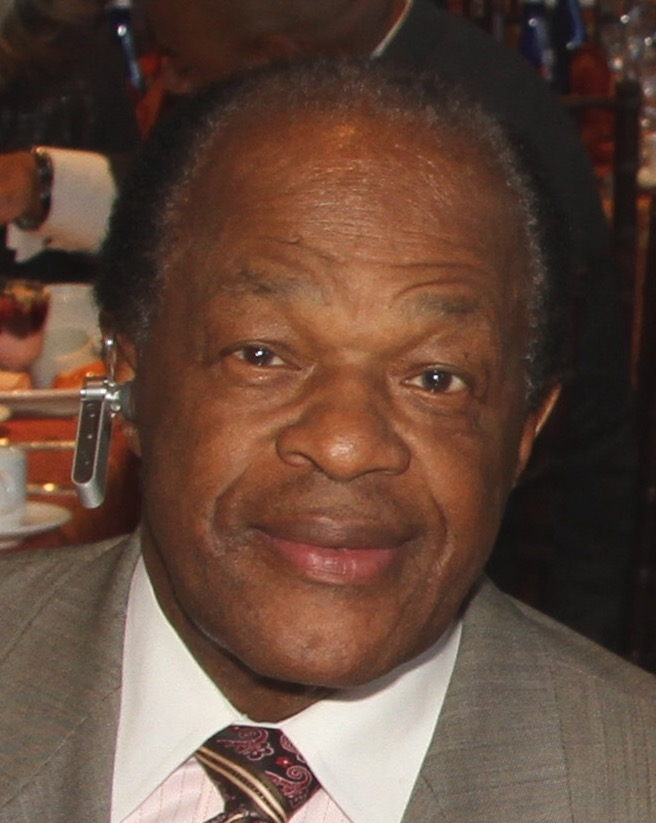

2nd and 4th Mayor of the District of Columbia
- In office January 2, 1995 – January 2, 1999
- Preceded by: Sharon Pratt
- Succeeded by: Tony Williams
- In office January 2, 1979 – January 2, 1991
- Preceded by: Walter Washington
- Succeeded by: Sharon Pratt

Member of the Council of the District of Columbia from Ward 8
- In office January 2, 2005 – November 23, 2014
- Preceded by: Sandy Allen
- Succeeded by: LaRuby May
- In office January 2, 1993 – January 2, 1995
- Preceded by: Wilhelmina Rolark
- Succeeded by: Eydie Whittington

Member of the Council of the District of Columbia from the at-large district
- In office January 2, 1975 – January 2, 1979
- Preceded by: Seat established
- Succeeded by: John Ray

Chair of the Student Nonviolent Coordinating Committee
- In office 1960–1961
- Preceded by: Position established
- Succeeded by: Charles McDew

Personal details
- Born: Marion Barry Jr. March 6, 1936 Itta Bena, Mississippi, U.S.
- Died: November 23, 2014 (aged 78) Washington, D.C., U.S.
- Resting place: Congressional Cemetery
- Party: Democratic
- Spouses: Blantie Evans (m. 1962; div. 1964); Mary Treadwell (m. 1972; div. 1977); Effi Slaughter (m. 1978; div. 1993); Cora Masters (m. 1993)
- Children: Marion (with Slaughter)
- Education: LeMoyne-Owen College (BS); Fisk University (MS); University of Kansas (attended); University of Tennessee (attended)
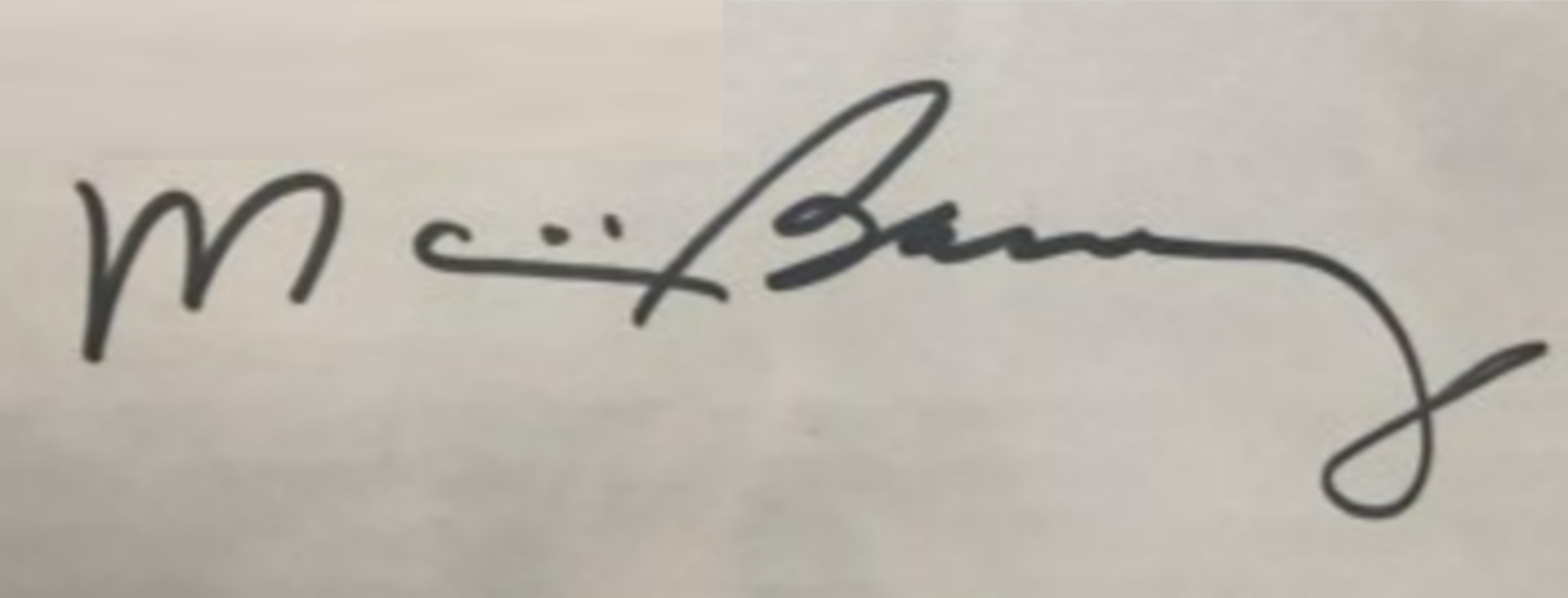
- Signature

Marion Shepilov Barry (born Marion Barry Jr.; March 6, 1936 – November 23, 2014) was an American politician who served as mayor of the District of Columbia from 1979 to 1991 and 1995 to 1999. A Democrat, Barry had served three tenures on the Council of the District of Columbia, representing as an at-large member from 1975 to 1979, in Ward 8 from 1993 to 1995, and again from 2005 to 2014.

In the 1960s, he was involved in the civil rights movement, first as a member of the Nashville Student Movement and then serving as the first chairman of the Student Nonviolent Coordinating Committee (SNCC). Barry came to national prominence as mayor of the nation's capital, the first prominent civil rights activist to become chief executive of a major American city. He gave the presidential nomination speech for Jesse Jackson at the 1984 Democratic National Convention.

His celebrity status was transformed into international notoriety in January 1990, when he was videotaped during a sting operation smoking crack cocaine and was arrested by Federal Bureau of Investigation (FBI) officials on drug charges. The arrest and subsequent trial precluded Barry from seeking re-election, and he served six months in a federal prison. After his release, he was elected to the Council of the District of Columbia in 1992. He was elected again as mayor in 1994, serving from 1995 to 1999.

Despite his history of political and legal controversies, Barry was an influential figure in Washington, D.C, enjoying varying popularity throughout his mayoral tenure. The alternative weekly Washington City Paper nicknamed him "Mayor for life". The Washington Post once stated that "to understand the District of Columbia, one must understand Marion Barry".

== Early life ==
Marion Barry was born in rural Itta Bena, Mississippi, the third child of Mattie Cummings and Marion Barry. His father died when he was four years old, and a year later his mother moved the family to Memphis, Tennessee, where her employment prospects were better. His mother married David Cummings, a butcher, and together they raised eight children. Growing up on Latham Street near South Parkway, Marion Barry attended Florida Elementary and graduated from Booker T. Washington High.

The first time Barry noticed racial issues was when he had to walk to school while the white students were assigned a school bus to ride. The schools were segregated, as were public facilities. He had a number of jobs as a child, including picking cotton, delivering and selling newspapers, and bagging groceries. While in high school, Barry worked as a waiter at the American Legion post and, at age 17, earned the rank of Eagle Scout.

Marion Barry first began his civil rights activism when he was a paperboy in Memphis. The paper he worked for organized a contest in which any boys who gained 15 new customers could win a trip to New Orleans. Barry and a couple of the other black paperboys reached the quota of 15 new customers yet were not allowed to go on the trip to New Orleans, a segregated city. The paper said it could not afford to hire two buses to satisfy Mississippi's segregation rules. Barry decided to boycott his paper route until they agreed to send the black paperboys on a trip. After the paper offered the black paperboys a chance to go to St. Louis, Missouri, on a trip, because it was not a segregated city, Barry resumed his paper route.

== 1955–1970: Education and civil rights activism ==
=== Undergraduate studies at LeMoyne-Owen College ===
Barry attended LeMoyne–Owen College, in Memphis, graduating in 1958. In his junior year, the racial injustices he had seen started to come together. He and his friends went to a segregated fairground in Memphis, and went at a time reserved for whites, because they wanted to see the science exhibit. When they were close to the exhibit, a policeman stopped them and asked them to leave. Barry and his friends left without protest. At that time, Barry did not know much about his race, or why they were treated poorly, but he resented the incident. Barry became more active in the NAACP chapter at LeMoyne-Owens, serving as president. It is sometimes said that his ardent support of the civil rights movement earned him the nickname "Shep", in reference to Soviet politician Dmitri Shepilov, and then Barry began using Shepilov as his middle name. But Barry stated in his autobiography that he chose the name with regard to his middle initial S, which had initially stood for nothing, after having found Shepilov's name in newspapers: "I had picked out 'Shepilov' as a middle name because it was the only one that I knew and liked."

In 1958, at LeMoyne-Owens, he criticized a college trustee for remarks he felt were demeaning to African Americans, for which he was nearly expelled. While a senior and the president of the NAACP chapter, Barry heard of Walter Chandler—the only white member on LeMoyne-Owen's board of trustees—making comments that black people should be treated as a "younger brother not as an adult". Barry wrote a letter to LeMoyne's president objecting to the comments and asking if Walter Chandler could be removed from the board. A friend of Barry's was the editor of the school newspaper, the Magician, and told Barry to run the letter in the paper. From there, the letter made it to the front page of Memphis' conservative morning paper.

=== Master's degree, Nashville Student Movement, SNCC ===
External videos
- "Interview with Marion Barry" conducted in 1979 for America, They Loved You Madly, a precursor to the Eyes on the Prize documentary in which he discusses sit-ins, decision-making within the Civil Rights movement and the Student Nonviolent Coordinating Committee.

Barry earned an M.S. in organic chemistry from Fisk University in 1960. He was a member of Alpha Phi Alpha fraternity. While in graduate school at Fisk, Barry was arrested several times while participating in the Nashville sit-ins to desegregate lunch counters and other Civil Rights Movement events. After graduating from Fisk, Barry continued to work in the Civil Rights Movement, focusing on the elimination of the racial segregation of bus passengers.

In 1960, Barry was elected as the first chairman of the Student Nonviolent Coordinating Committee (SNCC). He helped develop an organizing project in McComb, Mississippi. The project was both a voter registration and a direct action endeavor. Barry said he and other activists lived with the local people in order to stay safe, as well as to learn what it was like to live there. They could use that information to organize the members of the SNCC accordingly.

=== Doctoral studies ===
Barry began doctoral studies at the University of Kansas, but soon quit the program. He contemplated law school to help with his activism, but decided against it, because the delayed admission would mean that he would have to take a year off from school. Had he taken a year off, there was a chance of his being drafted into the military, and he did not want to be drafted.

He decided to go to the University of Tennessee where he was awarded a graduate fellowship. Despite being located in the South, the University of Tennessee was an integrated educational institution, a new experience for Barry. He began doctoral chemistry studies at the University of Tennessee in Knoxville, the only African American in the program. He learned that he was prohibited from tutoring white children, and his wife Blantie Evans was not allowed to work at the white school. He quit the program in favor of his new duties at SNCC.

In the spring of 1964, he attended a conference in Nashville and became one of the founders of the Southern Student Organizing Committee (SSOC).

=== Working for SNCC ===
As head of SNCC, Barry led protests against racial segregation and discrimination. After he left McComb, Barry lobbied the state legislatures to try to convince them to vote to make the Mississippi Freedom Democratic Party (MFDP) the recognized Democratic party of Mississippi in the 1964 Democratic National Convention. In a protest of their continuing disenfranchisement, African Americans had organized this party to prove that blacks wanted to vote and conducted a trial election. Barry slept on the boardwalk in Atlantic City the night after speaking to the New Jersey Legislature.

After he left the New York legislature, James Forman asked Barry to go to Washington, D.C., to manage SNCC's office. At the time, over half of the population of the District of Columbia was black; however, the District of Columbia was administered as a special federal district, not as a state, and therefore did not have voting representation in Congress.

In 1965, Barry and Evans moved to Washington, D.C., to open a local chapter of SNCC. He was deeply involved in coordinating peaceful street demonstrations as well as a boycott to protest bus fare increases. Barry organized rides to work for those who needed them. The boycott cost the bus line thousands of dollars, and Barry proved his ability to organize.

He also served as the leader of the Free D.C. Movement, strongly supporting increased home rule, as a Congressional committee exercised administrative rule over the district. Barry quit SNCC in 1967, when H. Rap Brown became chairman of the group. In 1967, Barry and Mary Treadwell co-founded Pride, Inc., a Department of Labor-funded program to provide job training to unemployed black men. The group employed hundreds of teenagers to clean littered streets and alleys in the district. Barry and Treadwell had met while students at Fisk University, and they later met again while picketing in front of the Washington Gas Light Company.

Barry and Treadwell married in 1972. They separated five years later.

Barry was active in the aftermath of the 1968 Washington, D.C., riots that followed the assassination of Martin Luther King Jr. in Memphis. He organized through Pride Inc. a program of free food distribution for poor black residents whose homes and neighborhoods had been destroyed in the rioting. Barry convinced the Giant Food supermarket chain to donate food, and he spent a week driving trucks and delivering food throughout the city's housing projects. He also became a board member of the city's Economic Development Committee, helping to route federal funds and venture capital to black-owned businesses that were struggling to recover from the riots.

When President Richard Nixon declared July 21, 1969, National Day of Participation in honor of the Moon landing by Apollo 11, Barry criticized him. Barry believed that Dr. Martin Luther King Jr. deserved a national honor day on his birthday, which Nixon had opposed. Said Barry, "Why should blacks feel elated when we see men eating on the moon when millions of blacks and poor whites don't have enough money to buy food here on earth?"

== 1971–1974: D.C. Board of Education ==
In 1971, Barry announced his candidacy for at-large member of the school board, running against the incumbent, Anita L. Allen. Barry said he wanted to steer the school board back to the "issues of education" and away from problems of personalities. Barry defeated Allen, with 58 percent of the vote to Allen's 34 percent.

After Barry was seated in 1972, he was unanimously elected as president of the board. He served as board president for two years, reorganizing the school system's finances and building consensus on the board.

In response to the 1972 blaxploitation film Super Fly, Barry quickly formed a protest group named Blacks Against Narcotics and Genocide (BANG). Barry said the film was harmful to black youth, and that it glorified drug abuse. BANG called for a boycott of the film.

Barry advocated for a larger budget for education and raises for teachers. Barry also supported the appointment of Barbara Sizemore as the district's superintendent, making of the District of Columbia the country's first major urban area with a woman as School Board Superintendent.

When the Senate held up annual payments to the district because of debate over whether the federal government should continue to pay for holding the district's partisan elections, Barry called for public hearings on the matter. He also commented, "Since it is a known fact that the majority makeup of an elected government will be black, the conferees' agreement indicates to me that some members of Congress are saying that black people cannot be fiscally responsible, and therefore, have to have a predominantly white Congress overseeing how our monies are spent."

== 1974–1979: D.C. Council and shooting ==
Upon establishment of the District of Columbia home rule in 1974, Barry was elected an at-large member of Washington's first elected city council. In that position, he served as chair of the District of Columbia Committee on Finance and Revenue. He was re-elected in 1976.

While serving on the Council of the District of Columbia, Barry was shot accidentally on March 9, 1977, by radical Hanafi Muslims (a breakaway sect of the Nation of Islam) when they overran the District Building. Barry was shot near his heart during the two-day 1977 Hanafi Siege in which hostages were held by the terrorists. This was finally defused by the FBI and Muslim ambassadors. Barry recovered from his injury.

=== 1978 mayoral election ===
Having credentials as an activist, legislator, and as a "hero" in a hostage crisis, as well as an early endorsement from The Washington Post, Barry ran for mayor in 1978 after Walter Washington, the district's first mayor, fell out of political favor.

In the Democratic primary, the real contest in the heavily Democratic, black-majority city, Barry ran with the campaign slogan "Take a Stand" and the promise to improve the "bumbling and bungling" District of Columbia administration. He won the Democratic primary election against his main rivals Mayor Washington and council chairman Sterling Tucker. The vote was so close that final tally was in doubt for over two weeks. Ultimately, Barry narrowly won the nomination, with Washington relegated to third place. Barry defeated his Republican opponent Arthur Fletcher and two other minor candidates in a landslide general election in November. He took office in January 1979 as the city's second popularly elected mayor since the restoration of home rule in 1973.

== 1979–1991: Mayor of the District of Columbia ==
=== First term ===
Barry's first four years in office were characterized by increased efficiency in city administration and government services, in particular the sanitation department. Barry also instituted his signature summer jobs program, in which summer employment was made available to every school-age resident. At the same time, Barry straightened the city's chaotic finances and attacked the deficit by introducing spending controls and laying off ten percent of the city's workforce. Each year of his first term saw a budget surplus of at least US$13 million. District of Columbia political reporter Jonetta Rose Barras characterized the first Barry administration as "methodical, competent, and intellectually superior."

However, unemployment rose dramatically during Barry's first administration, as did crime rates, in part because many of his layoffs were centered in the police department (1,500 terminations by 1981). His campaign promise to "take the boards off" public housing—i.e., to rehabilitate dilapidated and condemned public housing units—was slow in fulfillment. The city's debt was a constant problem as well: Barry had recalculated the Washington Administration's claim of a $41 million surplus and found that the city was $285 million in debt, a long-term accrual that his annual surpluses were unable to surmount by the end of his term. Graft and embezzlement among Barry appointees, such as Employment Services director Ivanhoe Donaldson, began late in Barry's first term, although it would not be discovered for several years. Barry was personally touched by a number of "mini-scandals". He had travels with finances he often kept secret. He was first reported to be using cocaine at downtown nightclubs.

=== Second term ===
In 1982, Barry faced re-election against a challenge from fellow Democrat Patricia Roberts Harris, an African-American woman who had served in two cabinet positions under President Jimmy Carter, as well as from council members John L. Ray and Charlene Drew Jarvis. In the primary election held September 14, 1982, Barry won with over 58% of the vote. He won 82% of the vote in the November 2 general election against Republican candidate E. Brooke Lee.

Barry's second term was more troublesome than his first. Though Washington experienced a massive real estate boom that helped alleviate the city's fiscal problems for a time, government spending skyrocketed; the administration posted a fifth straight budget surplus, but the next year struggled with a $110 million deficit. Much of the disparity was caused by Barry's policy of combating unemployment by creating government jobs; the city government's payrolls swelled so greatly that by 1986, nobody in the administration knew exactly how many employees it had.

In his first term, Barry had made a point of insisting that any firm wishing to do business with the city have minority partners, and shepherding legislation requiring 35% of all contracts to go to minority-owned firms. The policy was modified in his second term such that the administration gave contracts to Barry's political connections and high-end campaign contributors to the tune of $856 million. The city did not exercise sufficient oversight. The cost of services such as heating oil for the public schools inflated 40 percent, without any guarantee that the goods and services were being provided. City councilman John A. Wilson commented that "What started out to benefit the minority community at large has meant some politically influential blacks can move out to posh suburbs."

Several of his associates were indicted for financial malfeasance, including former administration officials Ivanhoe Donaldson and Alphonse G. Hill. Barry began to be plagued by rumors and press reports of womanizing and of alcohol and drug abuse; in particular, stories abounded of his cocaine use in the city's nightclubs and red-light district. In 1983, Barry's ex-wife, Mary Treadwell, was convicted of fraudulently using federal funds given to Pride, Inc., a group that helped local youth find employment. In 1984, Barry's one-time lover Karen Johnson was convicted of cocaine possession and contempt of court for refusing to testify to a grand jury about Barry's drug use. Barry's second four years in office had some high points, including the District's entry into the open bond market with Wall Street's highest credit rating, and Barry's nomination speech for Jesse Jackson at the 1984 Democratic Convention.

=== Third term ===
Barry sought a third term as mayor in 1986. By this time, his dominance of city politics was so absolute that he faced only token opposition in the Democratic primary in the form of former school board member Mattie Taylor, whom Barry dispatched rather easily. A new frontrunner emerged: Jesse Jackson, who had been encouraged by colleagues to seek the mayoralty, and who had been relatively popular in stark contrast to Barry's declining reputation. A mayoral aide remarked "We saw Jesse coming and were seriously worried". Barry, who knew that most of Jackson's income came from delivering speeches, used his political clout to arbitrarily disqualify Jackson by getting a law passed that said anyone who made more than a $10,000 per year in honoraria was ineligible to run for D.C. office. Council members jokingly called this the "Jesse Jackson law," as it was legislated expressly to keep Jackson out of the mayoral race. As expected, Barry defeated Republican city councilwoman Carol Schwartz fairly handily in the November 4 general election. However, Schwartz managed to win 33 percent of the vote—the first time a Republican had crossed the 30-percent barrier in a general election. For the third time, Barry received the endorsement of The Washington Post but "with far greater reservations and misgivings" than at any time in the past.

By this time, Barry was openly suffering from the effects of longstanding addictions to cocaine and alcohol; he would later admit that he lost control of his drug habit soon after being sworn in for a third term. His public appearances were marked by his glassy eyes and slurred speech. His aides began scheduling all of his daily events later and later in the day as he was arriving to work as late as lunchtime, and nodding off to sleep at his desk. His ability to function as mayor had become so impaired that even his closest associates urged him not to run again. They tried to create an endowed professorship for him at the University of the District of Columbia. In the wake of Barry's inattention, the city declined badly. Barry was watching Super Bowl XXI in Pasadena, California when a winter blizzard struck Washington in January 1987; city crews were accused of badly mishandling the road clearing, adversely affecting local businesses.

In 1987, crack use exploded in the city, as did territorial wars among drug dealers; in 1988 there were 369 homicides in the District of Columbia, the most ever in the city. That record was broken when the next year had 434 homicides, and it was broken again in 1990 with 474 homicides, making the District of Columbia's murder rate the highest in the nation. The District of Columbia government's employment and deficits grew as city services suffered; in particular, there were frequent press reports of deaths occurring because police lacked cars to get to crime scenes, and EMS services responded slowly or went to the wrong address.

=== 1990 arrest and drug conviction ===
By late 1989, federal officials had been investigating Barry on suspicion of illegal drug possession and use; that fall, they prosecuted several of Barry's associates for cocaine use, including Charles Lewis, a native of the United States Virgin Islands. He was implicated in a drug investigation involving Barry and a room at Washington's Ramada Inn in December 1988.

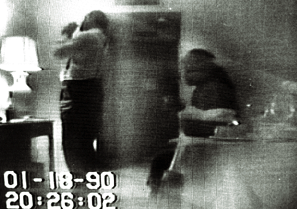
Barry captured on a surveillance camera smoking crack cocaine during a joint sting operation by the FBI and D.C. Police.

On January 18, 1990, Barry was arrested with a former girlfriend, Hazel Diane "Rasheeda" Moore, in a sting operation at the Vista International Hotel by the FBI and D.C. police for crack cocaine use and possession. Moore was an FBI informant when she invited Barry to the hotel room and insisted that he smoke freebase cocaine before they had sex, while agents in another room watched on camera, waiting for Barry to accept her offer. During the videotaped arrest, Barry says of Moore, "Bitch set me up ... I shouldn't have come up here ... goddamn bitch".

Barry was charged with three felony counts of perjury, 10 counts of drug possession, and one misdemeanor count of conspiracy to possess cocaine, even though the cocaine belonged to the government informant. The criminal trial ended in August 1990 with a conviction for only one possession incident, which had occurred in November 1989, and an acquittal on another. The jury deadlocked on the remaining charges. Six or seven jurors (of whom two were white and the rest black) believed that the evidence against Barry was overwhelming and that he had displayed "arrogance" during the trial. Against these, five black jurors were convinced that the prosecution had falsified evidence and testimony as part of a racist conspiracy against Barry, and even disputed factual findings that had not been contested in court, refusing to acknowledge that the crack cocaine that was part of the crime scene evidence was even crack at all. After scolding the jurors for not following his instructions, presiding judge Thomas Penfield Jackson declared a mistrial on the remaining charges.

As a result of his arrest and the ensuing trial, Barry decided in June 1990 not to seek re-election as mayor. However, he ran as an independent for an at-large seat on the council against 74-year-old incumbent Hilda Mason. Mason, a former ally who had helped Barry recuperate after the 1977 shooting, took the challenge personally, saying, "I do feel very disappointed in my grandson Marion Barry." Mason was endorsed by a majority of the council members and by Jesse Jackson, who was running for shadow senator.

Barry was sentenced to six months in federal prison on 26 October 1990, shortly before the November election, which he lost—the first and only electoral loss of his career—receiving 20 percent of the overall vote, but doing well among the voters of Ward 8. His wife and son moved out of the house later that month. On 26 October 1991, Barry surrendered himself at a correctional facility in Petersburg, Virginia. While serving his time, Barry was accused of letting a woman perform oral sex on him in a prison waiting room, a charge Barry denied. Barry was transferred to another federal prison in Loretto, Pennsylvania. Barry was released on 23 April 1992.

In May 2013, after Toronto mayor Rob Ford was videotaped smoking what was reported to be crack, parallels were made with the similarity to the 1990 incident. Barry denied any similarity, stating: "Unless he was entrapped by the government, it's not similar."

== 1992–1994: Political comeback ==
=== D.C. Council ===
Barry was released from prison in 1992, and two months later filed papers to run for the Ward 8 city council seat in that year's election. Barry ran under the slogan "He May Not Be Perfect, But He's Perfect for D.C." He defeated the four-term incumbent, Wilhelmina Rolark, in the Democratic primary, winning 70 percent of the vote, saying he was "not interested in being mayor", and went on to win the general election easily.

=== 1994 mayoral election ===
Despite his earlier statements to the contrary, observers of Barry's council victory expressed beliefs that he was laying ground for a mayoral run in 1994. Indeed, Barry fulfilled expectations when he formally announced his candidacy for mayor on May 21, 1994, and was immediately regarded as a serious challenge to the unpopular incumbent mayor, Sharon Pratt Kelly. Despite much opposition, including an abortive effort to recall him, Barry won a three-way Democratic primary contest for mayor with 48% of the vote on September 13, pushing Kelly into last place. The victory, coming after Barry's videotaped crack use and conviction shocked the nation, carried front-page headlines in newspapers such as the Los Angeles Times and Boston Globe.

An oft-repeated Barry quote came in the aftermath of his victory in the Democratic primary election, in which he counseled those voters who opposed his mayoral campaign to "get over it."

Though facing a credible challenge from Republican councilmember Carol Schwartz, who received the endorsement of The Washington Post, Barry was victorious in the general election with 56% to Schwartz's 42% of the vote. Not only was this easily the strongest showing by a Republican mayoral candidate since the restoration of home rule, but it was also the first time since then that a Democratic candidate for mayor had dropped below the 60 percent mark. It would not occur again until Muriel Bowser won the 2014 general election with 54% of the vote.

== 1995–1999: D.C. Mayor fourth term ==
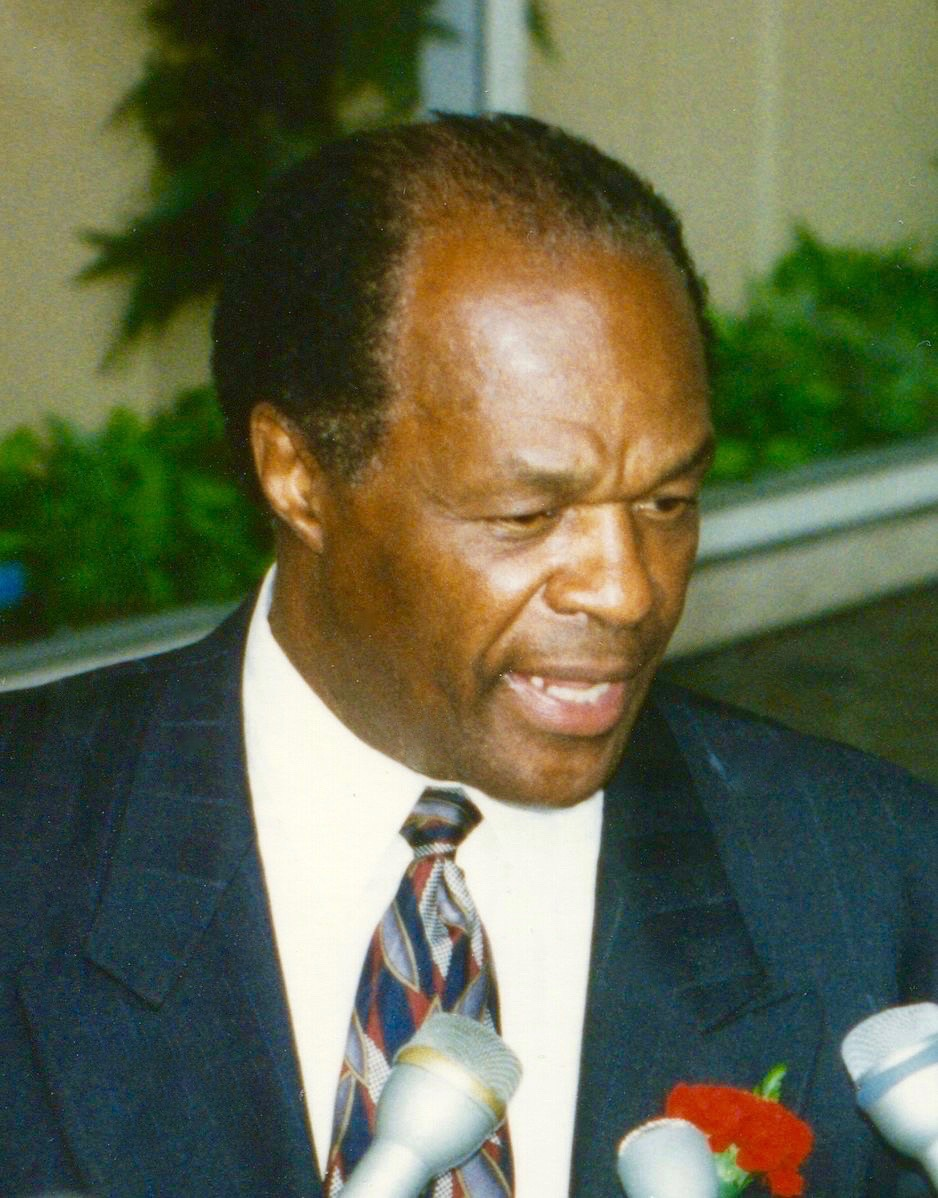
Barry in 1996

Barry was sworn into office on January 2, 1995, and was almost immediately confronted with a financial crisis. The budgetary problems of his previous administrations had only increased during Kelly's term, with city officials estimating a fiscal 1996 deficit between $700 million and $1 billion. In addition, city services remained extremely dysfunctional due to mismanagement. One month into his term, Barry declared that the city government was "unworkable" in its present state and lobbied Congress to take over the areas of its operation that were analogous to typical state government functions. Wall Street, which Barry had convinced just after his election to continue investing in municipal bonds, reduced the city's credit rating to "junk status." Instead of implementing Barry's proposals, the newly Republican Congress (who had come to power on promises of decreasing federal spending) placed several city operations into receivership and created the District of Columbia Financial Control Board to assume complete authority over the city's day-to-day spending and finances, including overrule of the mayor's fiscal decisions.

The next two years were dominated by budgetary and policy battles between Barry and the control board—along with Chief Financial Officer Anthony A. Williams—for power over the District of Columbia's operation. The conflict was ultimately settled when in 1997 the Clinton Administration and Senator Lauch Faircloth agreed on legislation that rescued the city from its financial crisis but stripped Barry of all authority (including hiring and firing) over nine district agencies, making them directly answerable to the control board. Barry was left with control of only the Department of Parks and Recreation, the public libraries, and the Board of Tourism, as well as the ceremonial trappings of his office—a condition he characterized "a rape of democracy".

Barry declined to run for a fifth term in office in June 1998, stating his belief that Congress would not restore full home rule while he was mayor. He was succeeded by city CFO Anthony A. Williams.

== 2000–2014: D.C. Council ==
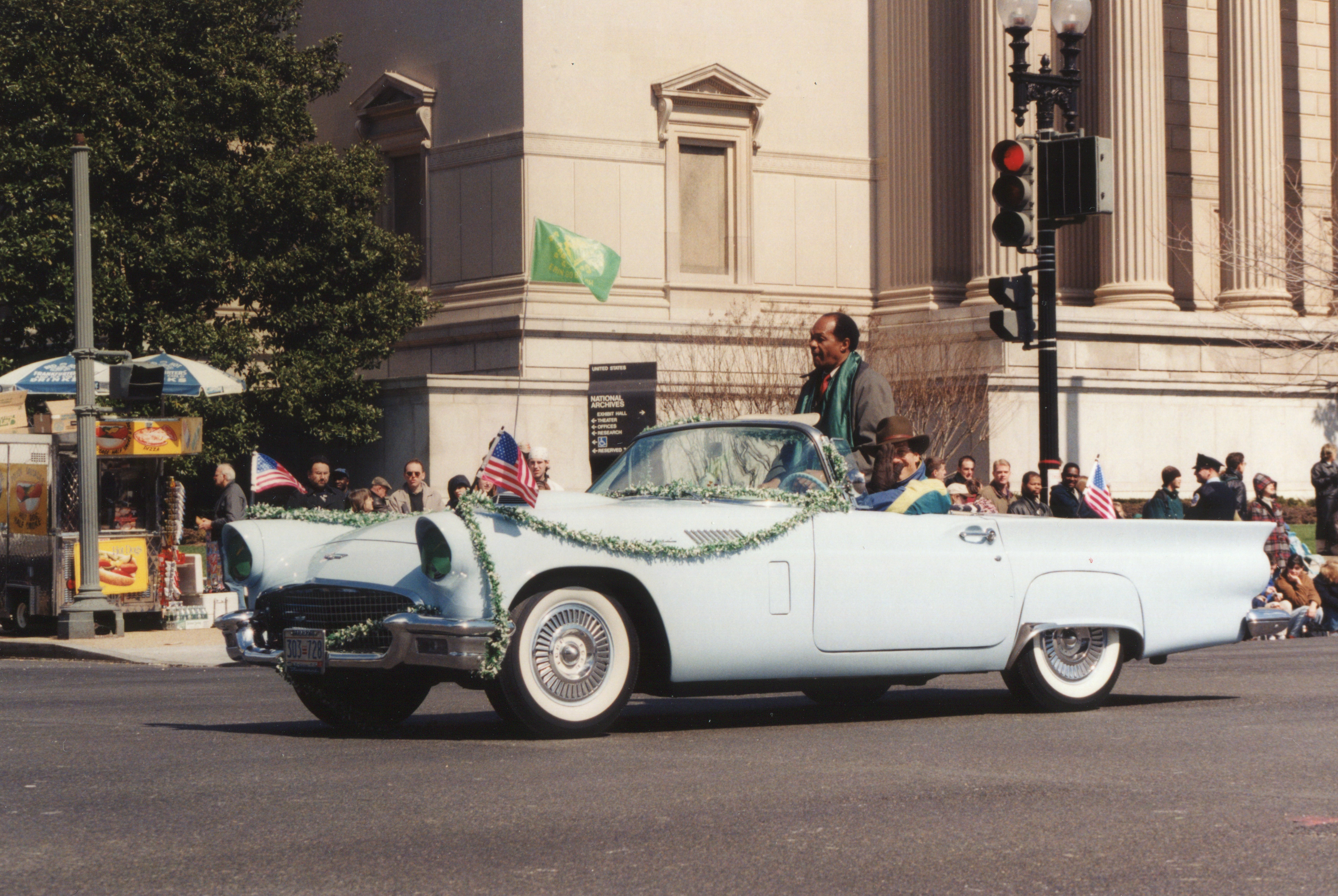
Barry at the 1998 Saint Patrick's Day parade in Washington, D.C.

After leaving office, Barry performed consulting work for an investment banking firm. On March 6, 2002, Barry declared his intention to challenge at-large council member Phil Mendelson in the Democratic primary. Within a month, he decided against running, after an incident in which U.S. Park Police found traces of marijuana and cocaine in his car.

On June 12, 2004, Barry announced that he was running in the Democratic primary for the Ward 8 council seat, a position he held before becoming mayor. Barry received 58% of the vote, defeating the incumbent council member, Sandy Allen, on September 14, 2004. Barry received 95% of the vote in the general election, giving him a victory in the race to represent Ward 8 in the council.

During the 2006 mayoral election, Barry endorsed Adrian Fenty despite Linda Cropp hiring many members of Barry's former political machine. Barry had publicly clashed with Fenty over D.C. United's proposed soccer stadium in Barry's Ward 8. Barry was the stadium's most outspoken supporter on the council, whereas Fenty attempted to distance himself from his initial support for the project.

In July 2007, Marion Barry was chosen as one of fifty wax statues to debut in the Washington, D.C., franchise of Madame Tussauds Wax Museum. Barry was chosen by a majority of Washington residents and tourists from Tussauds' "Top 10 Wish List," in a contest that pitted him against Cal Ripken Jr., Al Gore, Denzel Washington, Carl Bernstein, Halle Berry, Martin Sheen, Marilyn Monroe, Nancy Reagan and Oprah Winfrey.

Barry ran for re-election in 2008 and easily held off all five challengers in the Democratic primary: Ahmad Braxton-Jones, Howard Brown, Chanda McMahan, Sandra Seegars and Charles Wilson. No Republican or Statehood Green candidates filed to run in the Ward 8 council race.

=== Vote on gay marriage ===
In May 2009, Barry voted against a bill committing Washington, D.C., to recognize same-sex marriages performed elsewhere. During his 2008 reelection campaign, Barry had told members of the Gertrude Stein Democratic Club, the city's largest LGBT political group, "I don't think you should make [supporting the bill] a litmus test. But if a bill like that were to come up, I would vote for it." Following his May 2009 vote against recognizing gay marriages, Barry was criticized for what activists believed to be an apparent flip-flop. Councilman Phil Mendelson said he was surprised by the vote because Barry had signed on as a co-introducer of the marriage bill. Barry said his position had not changed and warned that the council needed to move slowly on this issue. Citing his belief that the local African-American community was overwhelmingly opposed to gay marriage, "All hell is going to break loose", Barry said. "We may have a civil war. The black community is just adamant against this."

=== Legal problems ===
==== Failures to file tax returns and pay taxes ====
On October 28, 2005, Barry pleaded guilty to the misdemeanor charges stemming from an IRS investigation. The mandatory drug testing for the hearing showed Barry as being positive for cocaine and marijuana. On March 9, 2006, he was sentenced to three years' probation for misdemeanor charges of failing to pay federal and local taxes, and underwent drug counseling.

In 2007, federal prosecutors sought to have his probation revoked for failure to file his 2005 tax return. U.S. Magistrate Judge Deborah Robinson refused, saying that prosecutors had not proved that the failure was willful, even if Barry was aware he had missed the deadline. According to Judge Robinson, sentencing Barry to jail without proving that he willfully failed to file his taxes would contradict precedent set by the United States Supreme Court.

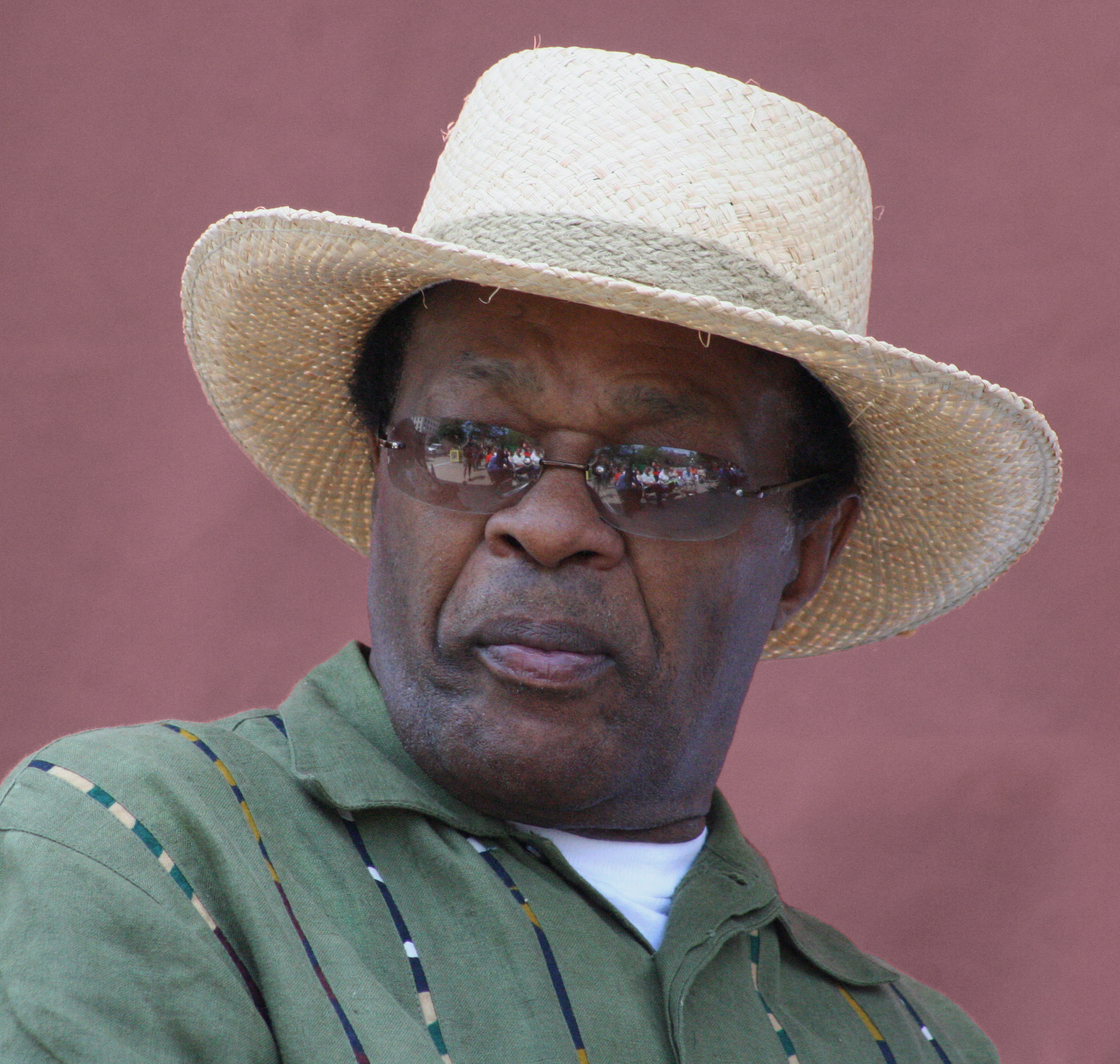
Barry in 2007

On February 9, 2009, prosecutors filed a motion in federal court to revoke Barry's probation for not filing his 2007 tax return, which violated his probation. According to one prosecutor, Barry had not filed his taxes eight of the last nine years. Barry said the reason he did not file his taxes was because of distractions from his medical problems, although he noted that there is "no excuse" for not filing. In an interview, Barry said he had been undergoing four-hour dialyses three times a week as treatment for a problem with his kidney. At that point, a kidney donor had been identified, but the operation had yet to be scheduled. On February 17, WTOP-FM reported that, according to Barry's attorney, Barry had filed his federal and District tax returns for 2007. The same day, Barry was admitted to Howard University Hospital to prepare for a kidney transplant the next day. Barry was released from the hospital on February 27, but he was readmitted on March 2 due to large amounts of air in his abdominal cavity and also due to Barry's complaints of serious pains, both of which were caused by the combination of medications Barry was taking after the operation. Barry was released from the hospital on March 6. On April 17, 2009, the prosecution withdrew their request to revoke Barry's probation.

On September 9, 2011, the Internal Revenue Service filed a notice of federal tax lien against Barry because of $3,200 of unpaid federal income taxes for 2010. Barry attributed the lien to poor communication between the Internal Revenue Service and his representatives.

==== Alleged traffic violations ====
On September 10, 2006, Barry was stopped by Secret Service Uniformed Division police officers after stopping at a green light and running a red light. According to a Secret Service spokesman, the police officers pulled over his car, smelled alcohol, and administered a field sobriety test. Barry was then taken to the U.S. Capitol Police station for a breathalyzer test. The Secret Service said that the breathalyzer test did not give an accurate reading, but Barry later said that it gave a successful reading of 0.02%, which is less than the legal limit of 0.08%. The police officers asked Barry to give a urine analysis, which Barry refused. The officers gave Barry a ticket for running a red light and failing to submit to a urine analysis. He was also charged with driving an unregistered vehicle and misuse of temporary tags. Barry pleaded not guilty to the charges. Prosecutors offered Barry a deal to drop the charge of driving under the influence in exchange for a guilty plea from Barry; he declined. A judge found him not guilty of the charges.

On December 16, 2006, the Park Police pulled over Barry for driving too slowly, which Barry later said was because he was trying to figure out where to enter an elementary school's parking lot for a nonprofit foundation's event. After looking up Barry's record, the police officer told Barry that his license had been suspended and ticketed Barry for operating a vehicle on a suspended license, despite Barry's insistence to the contrary. Two days later, the D.C. Department of Motor Vehicles confirmed that Barry's license had not actually been suspended and said a computer glitch must have caused the error.

On August 2, 2014, Barry was in a traffic accident in the district, which his spokesperson blamed on a "hypoglycemic attack" due to his diabetes. At the time of the accident, Barry had $2,800 in unpaid tickets for speeding and parking violations accumulated since 2012.

==== Conflict of interest: personal benefit from contract to girlfriend ====
On July 4, 2009, Barry was taken into custody by the Park Police after political consultant Donna Watts-Brighthaupt, his ex-girlfriend, claimed he was stalking her. Barry was arrested and charged with "misdemeanor stalking". Following an interview with authorities, he was released on citation and told he must appear before the Superior Court of the District of Columbia on July 9. However, all charges were dropped on July 8.

An investigative report by a special counsel said that Barry had personally benefited from a contract that he had awarded to his then-girlfriend Donna Watts-Brighthaupt. The report stated that Barry had awarded a contract to Watts-Brighthaupt, who then repaid money owed to Barry with the proceeds of the contract. When interviewed by the special counsel, Watts-Brighthaupt admitted to plagiarizing substantial portions of her study from a publicly available study by the United States Department of Education. The special counsel report also said that Barry had requested 41 earmarks in 2009 worth $8.4 million, some of which were paid to organizations "rife with waste and abuse." The report also said that Barry had impeded the investigation by refusing to respond to questions and by telling witnesses not to respond to questions and not give subpoenaed documents to the special counsel.

Barry responded to the special counsel report by claiming he had violated no written rules or procedures on such contracts and that there was no conflict of interest. Barry apologized for his "very, very poor judgment."

In response to the special counsel's report, several council members said they would like to hear a response from Barry before considering a censure. On March 2, 2010, the Council of the District of Columbia voted 12–0 in favor of stripping Barry of all committee assignments, ending his chair of the Committee on Housing and Workforce Development, and removing him from the Committee on Finance and Revenue.

=== Asian American racist remarks controversy ===
At a party celebrating his primary victory for his D.C. council seat on April 3, 2012, Barry said, "We've got to do something about these Asians coming in, opening up businesses, those dirty shops. They ought to go, I'll just say that right now, you know. But we need African-American businesspeople to be able to take their places, too."

Several other council members, Mayor Vincent Gray, and Delegate Eleanor Holmes Norton criticized Barry's comments. Five Asian American members of the Maryland General Assembly also called on Barry to apologize in a statement, saying, "At best, Mr. Barry's attack on Asian Americans is deeply troubling, and at worst it is race baiting."

Barry apologized for his comments, saying in a written statement, "It is to these less than stellar Asian-American businessmen in Ward 8 that my remarks were directed, not the whole of Asian businessmen in Ward 8 or the Asian-American population."

Several weeks later, Barry sparked a diplomatic incident with the diplomatic mission from the Philippines, after he said at a meeting with UDC personnel that "it's so bad, that if you go to the hospital now, you'll find a number of immigrants who are nurses, particularly from the Philippines ... And, no offense, but let's grow our own teachers, let's grow our own nurses, so that we don't have to be scrounging around in our community clinics and other kinds of places, having to hire people from somewhere else."

While apologizing to Asian Americans for his previous comments, Barry used the anti-Polish slur Polack.

== Personal life ==
While attending Tennessee State University Barry met Blantie Charlesetta Evans. They married on March 3, 1962, in Nashville. In June 1964, Barry "disappeared", leaving his wife "impoverished", according to a divorce suit that she filed in 1969. Her divorce was granted by a judge who found that Barry had "abandoned" her.

Barry met Mary Treadwell at Fisk University. They were married from 1972 to 1975.

Barry married Effi Slaughter, his third wife, just after announcing his candidacy for mayor in 1978. The couple had one son, Marion Christopher Barry, who died of a drug overdose on August 14, 2016. During his first three terms as mayor, Barry lived and raised his family at 3607 Suitland Road SE in the Anacostia section of DC. The Barrys separated in November 1990, soon after he was caught on videotape smoking crack cocaine with an ex-model and propositioning her for sex. They divorced in 1993, but Effi returned to Washington and supported him in his successful bid for a city council seat in 2004. Effi died on September 6, 2007, after an 18-month battle with acute myeloid leukemia.

Barry married Cora Masters on January 8, 1993. Masters was a political science professor at the University of the District of Columbia and his former spokeswoman.

== Death ==
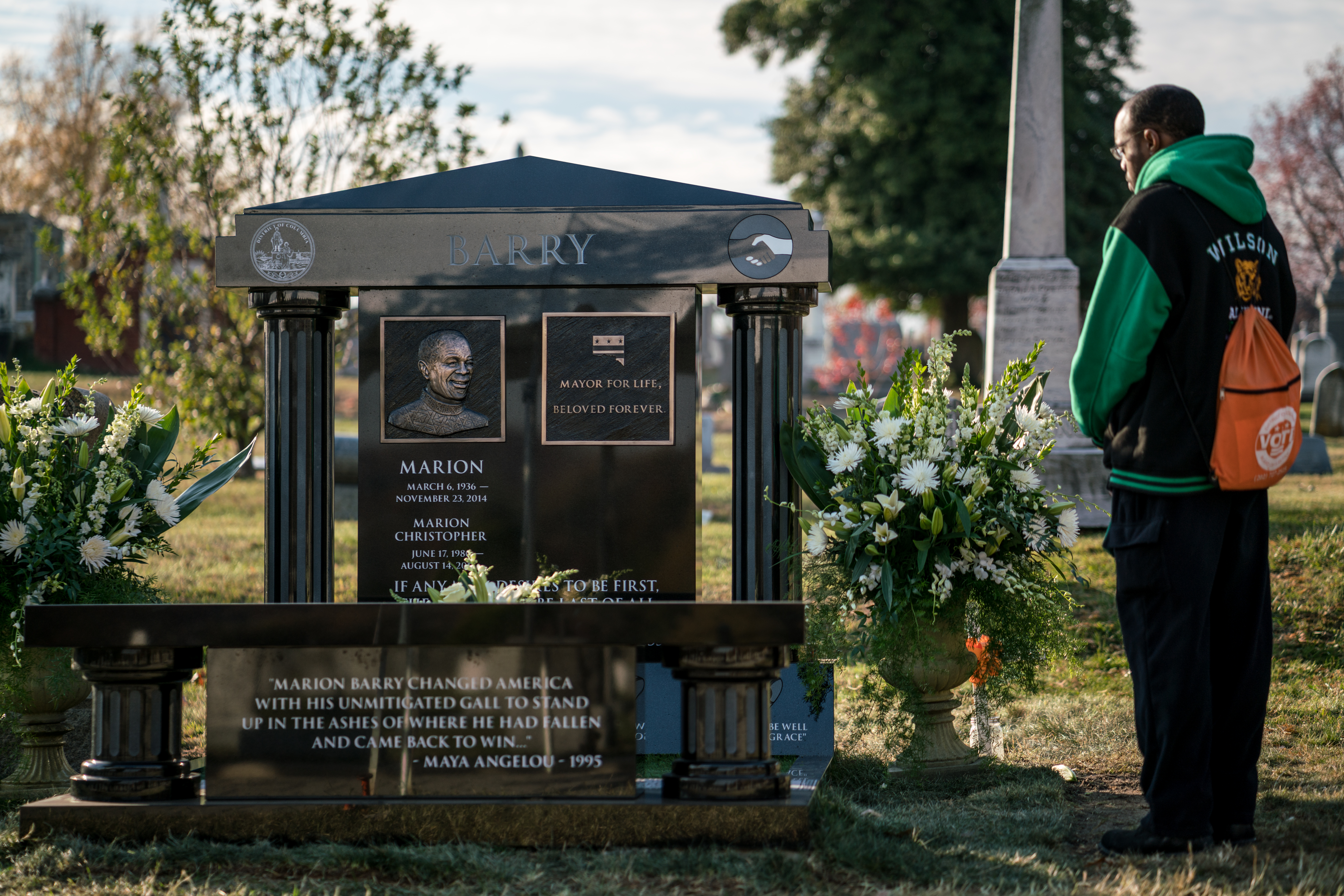
Barry's memorial at Congressional Cemetery

Barry died from heart disease at United Medical Center in Washington, D.C., on November 23, 2014, aged 78. Following three days of memorial observances, he was buried on December 6 at Washington's Congressional Cemetery.

A private monument to Barry was erected over his grave and unveiled on November 22, 2016. The event was attended by current and former D.C. Council members, former mayor Sharon Pratt Kelly, and about 150 other dignitaries, family members, and friends of Barry. The memorial, conceived and largely designed by Cora Masters Barry and Marion Christopher Barry, was carved by nationally prominent sculptor and engraver Andy Del Gallo and manufactured by Eastern Memorials (a D.C.-based funerary monument company).

== Legacy ==
In June 2009, a documentary of Barry's life was released at Silverdocs. The documentary was released in August 2009 on HBO.

A 1993 survey of historians, political scientists and urban experts conducted by Melvin G. Holli of the University of Illinois at Chicago ranked Barry as the eleventh-worst American big-city mayor to have served between the years 1820 and 1993.

In April 2014, in the midst of a contentious mayoral race in Newark, New Jersey, the future victor Ras Baraka was asked by Rutgers University professor and Newark city historian Clement A. Price to choose his role models as mayor. In response, Baraka named Barry and Chokwe Lumumba of Jackson, Mississippi.

In November 2023, Good Hope Road SE, which ran through Wards 7 and 8 in Anacostia, was renamed as Marion Barry Avenue SE.

== See also ==
- List of Alpha Phi Alpha brothers
- List of Eagle Scouts
- List of mayors of Washington, D.C.
- List of members of the Council of the District of Columbia
- The Nine Lives of Marion Barry
- List of federal political scandals in the United States

Party political offices
Preceded by Walter Washington	Democratic nominee for Mayor of the District of Columbia; 1978, 1982, 1986	Succeeded by Sharon Pratt
Preceded by Sharon Pratt	Democratic nominee for Mayor of the District of Columbia; 1994	Succeeded by Anthony Williams
Political offices
Preceded by Walter Washington	Mayor of the District of Columbia; 1979–1991	Succeeded by Sharon Pratt
Preceded by Sharon Pratt	Mayor of the District of Columbia; 1995–1999	Succeeded by Tony Williams
