= Rufus Mayfield =

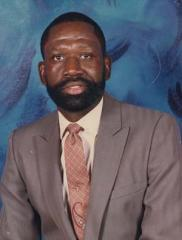
Rufus "Catfish" Mayfield

Rufus G. "Catfish" Mayfield is an American activist, community organizer, and civil rights worker. He is a cofounder of Destiny-Pride, Inc., a Washington, DC–based civic organization dedicated to improving the lives of African-American youths.

== Personal life ==
Mayfield was born at Columbia Hospital and was raised in what is now Northeast, DC in a projects called Parkside. He is the youngest of six children; he had three sisters, Doris and Jean who are both deceased, Lenoris, and two brothers, Clifton and James. His parents are Rufus Sr and Hattie Mayfield. He went to Neval Thomas Elementary School, Woodson Junior High and eventually Chamberlain Vocational.

Growing up in a heavily segregated Washington, D.C., Mayfield was never given the opportunity to interact with other cultures besides his own. He lived in Parkside, which was a part of a quadrant of other projects including East Capitol, Lincoln Heights, and Barry Farm. A the time, members of each community stayed within their “section” and co-mingling was rare. In fact, the quadrants were self- contained and designed to keep members of each respective project in their own neighborhood.

Mayfield's mother played a large role in the development of shaping him into the man he is today. Hattie Lee Mayfield was a functioning illiterate. Rufus spent a lot of his time as a child trying to teach his mother how to read and write. He truly admired her ability to still provide for their family and instill a value in practicing their faith. Toward the end of her life she was spotlighted in a Chicago Tribune article about women in Washington, D.C.. As for his father, Rufus Mayfield Sr, Mayfield learned a lot about discipline, structure and “being a man”. He was also a great provider for him and the rest of the family.

From the ages of 12 to 17, Rufus spent time in and out of detention centers for stealing cars. As a child, he would take his father and uncle's cars in order to gain attention from others due to some underlying self- esteem issues he possessed. As he got older, he began stealing from used car lots and ended up serving time in Oak Hill Detention Center at the age of 12 and the National Training School at the age of 17.

In 1973, Mayfield met his wife, Nancy Carter, at the Mark IV Supper Club. The two were engaged for nearly 20 years. Subsequently, they had three children, Phillipe, Rufus III and Reginald. Reginald Mayfield predeceased his parents on August 13, 2010.

== Activism/Destiny-Pride, Inc. ==
In 1967, Mayfield became the chairman of Destiny-Pride, Inc. Upon its establishment, the organization helped to employ nearly 1,400 black youths in the rougher parts of D.C. Workers were paid between $56 and $100 weekly; this may not have not been the most luxurious job, but it was enough to keep them off the streets. Work done entailed cleaning over 1,400 city streets, 1,200 alleys and killing over 25,00 rats. On weekends, 600 youths worked 13 hours while attending school full-time during the week.

When the organization first launched, Destiny- Pride, Inc. was only able to secure $300,000 in government funding just to “carry them” through the summer. When they asked for more, Virginia Republican, Joel Broyhill of House District of Columbia, implied that Mayfield couldn't even be trusted with the money. After gaining the support of nearly 30,000 signatures on a petition, Destiny-Pride, Inc.’s funding went up to an impressive $2.3 million for the following years to come.

Mayfield started the organization after experiencing the effects of police brutality and how it effects the perception of both whites on blacks, and blacks on themselves. Mayfield was only 17 when his best friend, Clarence Booker, was shot in the back during an altercation with a police officer. The pair were fighting over a 29¢ box of cookies which the officer thought Booker was stealing. During the altercation, Mayfield pleaded with Booker to let go of the officer's gun because he believed there was no reason for the officer to shoot him over a 29¢ box of cookies. Booker was dead on site; however, when Mayfield made attempts at visiting his friend in the hospital, he was told Booker only received bruises from the incident and had been charged with assaulting an officer. The next day, Mayfield's mother had informed him about Booker's death. This news sparked motivation in Mayfield to get justice for his friend.

During their attempts to get the officer indicted, Mayfield led several protests in which numerous kids were involved. One of the protests involved a hearse, provided by a local funeral home, with a coffin on top in remembrance of Booker. Marion Barry, who happened to be boycotting the D.C. transit system at the time, and Sterling Tucker, who was in charge of the Urban League helped to create a large group of other DC activists in efforts to get Officer Rull indicted. Despite their efforts, he was never charged with anything.

Mayfield was familiar with a woman named Ruth Bates Harris who was head of the Commission on Human Rights. He was determined to get her help in hopes of having the police officer arrested for homicide. After communicating with Ms. Harris, the idea for Destiny-Pride, Inc was born. This incident was the icing on the cake for Mayfield; he realized the black, youth needed someone to remind them of their importance and self worth. As a child, he dealt with many issues regarding the color of his dark skin tone. He was always deemed less attractive, less intelligent, and overall just less of anything. Much of his criminal record is caused by his insecurities as a child; he stole vehicles to gain attention from his peers because that was the only way he could felt he could be deemed as socially acceptable.

An organization like Destiny-Pride, Inc. had never been conceived before; they were helping to bring unity within the black community. Mayfield heavily believed in helping one another before we worry about the nation; he felt that in order to help the black community, they must work to help themselves first. Mayfield had “section chiefs” in each project quadrant, each of whom had a supervisor. During this time in DC, even blacks didn't get along with each other, so the projects were consistently more violent with black on black crime. Mayfield used these representatives to help relieve crimes such as fightings, shootings, and stabbings. Their efforts brought unity to the communities by having over 1,400 kids from all four projects be a part of Pride, Inc.

In 1968, Mayfield had a falling out with Barry who cofounded Destiny-Pride, Inc with him. Barry felt that Mayfield was too aggressive with his attacks on the system after the Labor Union had given Pride, Inc. a grant when they first formed. Mayfield felt too strongly that, even though Pride, Inc had made tremendous progress, there was still discriminate against blacks and more still needed to be done. After Barry's numerous attempts to quiet Mayfield, they parted ways.

After leaving Pride, Inc, Mayfield was contacted by Jerry Brenner, who worked for CBS at the time, and was ultimately given the opportunity to do speaking tours and other activist related activities where he traveled to many midwestern states speaking at institutions like the University of Minnesota Duluth, the University of Wisconsin--Eau Claire and Luther College in Deborah, Iowa and the University of Indiana in Bloomington. He just wanted to remain heard after leaving Destiny-Pride, Inc. In 1970, he received a scholarship from the George Washington University in which he studied in the Business Administration after he was persuaded out of the Divinity School because “blacks always go into something like that”. He then left GWU to work with Common Cause to help ratify the 18-year old vote; his participation in this movement derailed his tenure at GWU. Mayfield also received a contract with the Minneapolis Star where the ran a weekly column called “‘A Voice from the Ghetto’ by Rufus ‘Catfish’ Mayfield”.

== Hiatus ==
After leaving GWU, Mayfield met Junior Gilliam, the owner of a DC nightclub named Shelter Room. He became an MC for the club, mostly doing jokes. After leaving the Shelter Room, Mayfield began working for Paul Cohn, who owned the infamous Mark IV Supper Club and the Room Nightclub. His stint as an emcee there was overly successful. The crowd loved him. Subsequently, Mayfield began touring with entertainers like Gladys Knight and the Pips, Natalie Cole, the Temptations, the Dramatics, and even James Brown.

In 1985, Mayfield entered the Department of Human Services. He was heavily disappointed when he realized he could not utilize his activism there; being an activist still played a large role in what he identified as. He absolutely hated working for the city. When Sharon Pratt became mayor, she wanted to start firing innocent worker who needed these jobs to survive. H.R. Crawford, who was on city council, and John Wilson, chairman of the council, decided to be in support of Pratt just because she had won after Marion's arrest in 1990. Mayfield was then fed up with the entire system and decided to stand up to Pratt after the incident. He was terminated from his position after doing so.

Mayfield started working for the government again in 1995. He met Wayne Casey, who provided him with the instruction to become well versed with aspects of the Department of Human Services. He was also the Acting Administrator for the Youth Service Administration for three weeks when Casey was on vacation. Mayfield was eventually given a promotion at DHS when his supervisor relocated to Maryland. He utilized this position to rebuild the environment at DHS, considering the vulnerability of the people they were working with.

Mayfield first saw Dr. King when he was speaking at the Roosevelt Hotel right before the Poor Peoples Campaign, which Mayfield had worked on. Mayfield was hesitant to attend the speech, since he resigned with the Malcolm X approach to activism, but ended up going anyway. Dr. King, who was preaching about the repeal of the Internment Act, claimed that blacks would be viewed more like the Japanese if they resisted less. These words resigned with Mayfield; even though he wanted the fire in his voice like Malcolm X, Dr. King's words helped humble his ideas and solidify his belief in Christianity. Mayfield was then brought to meet with Dr. King before he was leaving to New York for Johnny Carson's Tonight Show. Dr. King told Mayfield “Catfish, I look forward to working with you”; before the pair could meet Dr. King was assassinated shortly after.
