= Willie Hardy =

American politician (1922–2007)

Chair pro tempore of the Council of the District of Columbia
- In office January 3, 1977 – January 2, 1979
- Preceded by: Douglas E. Moore
- Succeeded by: Nadine Winter

Member of the Council of the District of Columbia from Ward 7
- In office January 2, 1975 – January 1, 1981
- Preceded by: Position established
- Succeeded by: H. R. Crawford

Personal details
- Born: Willie White; July 18, 1922 St. Louis, Missouri, U.S.
- Died: August 18, 2007 (aged 85) Washington, D.C., U.S.
- Party: Democratic
- Spouse(s): DeSales Carter (1940s–1950); Lloyd Hardy (1954–1970)
- Children: 7
- Education: Atlantic Business School (attended)

Willie J. Hardy (July 18, 1922 – August 18, 2007) was a Democratic politician and activist in Washington, D.C. She was elected as one of the original members of the Council of the District of Columbia in 1974 when D.C. gained home rule. She represented Ward 7 on the council from 1975 to 1981.

== Early years ==
Willie White was born in St. Louis to James and Willie V. White (née Dixon). The family moved to Deanwood in Washington, D.C., when she was five-years-old. White attended D.C. public schools. Growing up, her mother would collect used clothing in order to give it to the less fortunate, something that Hardy said inspired her to help people in need as an adult. Her mother also volunteered at a local school for children of color, teaching them sewing and canning.

She married DeSales Carter, a Navy seaman. They had one son. They later divorced. In 1954, she married Lloyd Hardy, who worked as a taxi driver. They gave birth to three children and adopted one child.

== Activism ==
In the 1950s, Hardy worked for the United States Department of the Treasury. She attended Atlantic Business School at night in order to qualify for a promotion. Hardy heard a radio appeal for volunteers to help on Hubert Humphrey's 1960 presidential campaign, and she was inspired to help.

Hardy resigned her position at the Department of the Treasury in order to devote all of her time to politics without running afoul of the Hatch Act. She served as the executive secretary for the inaugural committee for John F. Kennedy. In November 1961, she worked for the office of Senator Philip Hart.

In the early 1960s, Hardy served as the secretary of the Far East Democratic Organization, which was known for helping families whose applications for welfare had been declined or who had lost eligibility due to changes initiated by Senator Robert Byrd. She helped find food, shelter, jobs, clothing, and heat for people in need. She was also a member of the District Citizens Council and the Democratic Central Committee of the District of Columbia.

By 1965, Hardy was volunteering for the Metropolitan Community Aid Council, Inc., helping homeless people find affordable homes. The Council also collected used clothing and sold it for little to nothing to families in need from its headquarters in Deanwood.

As part of the Citizen's Committee on Glen Echo, Hardy advocated for the end of Glen Echo Park's whites-only policy in 1966.

Hardy was elected the head of the University Neighborhood Council in 1966. Established by Howard University, the Council helped people in need in Cardozo. She organized Operation Checkmate, a group of older teenagers who would report violations committed by police officers and sanitation workers. Hardy organized college students to teach adults how to read, and she helped children with their homework.

By 1968, Hardy was leading the Black United Front, a group that demanded "equality, the kind that goes deeper than laws and legislation. We want power to participate", in Hardy's words. She agreed with the principles of nonviolence in concept while still reserving the right to defend oneself from physical violence. When Martin Luther King Jr. was murdered, Hardy said, "When white America killed the father of nonviolence, it killed all hope of settling our problems by peaceful means." She characterized the murder as a "declaration of war".

A few weeks after the Washington riots, Hardy spoke as part of a panel titled "Civil War U.S.A.—'68?" along with Walter Fauntroy and Marion Barry.

After the riots, youths asked Hardy how they could help rebuild the city. Hardy and the Metropolitan Community Aid Council applied for, and were awarded, a federal grant to connect young adults with skilled tradesman who renovate dilapidated houses together. The youths were paid from grant funds and learned valuable skills, and landlords paid for the materials.

== Council of the District of Columbia ==
In 1974, Hardy was a candidate to represent Ward 7 on the Council of the District of Columbia when the Council was established. She won the Democratic Party primary election with 30 percent of the vote.

In the general election, she ran against Republican John West, who ran a charity providing transportation to those in need; Independent Durand A. Ford, a student at Federal City College; Independent Sarah Mills, an unemployed former employee of the District of Columbia Unemployment Compensation board; and Independent Purnell Pinkney, a math teacher at Federal City College. Hardy won the general election with 80 percent of the vote for a two-year term in office. On the Council, Hardy chaired the committees on Public Safety, Advisory Neighborhood Commissions, Housing and Economic Development, Finance and Revenue, and the Judiciary.

Hardy ran for reelection in 1976. In the Democratic Party primary election, she was challenged by Walter E. Bayard, a financial advisor living in Deanwood; and Barbara A. Morgan, a public school teacher. Bayard said that the Council's vote to allow the District to issue bonds in the future would inevitably mean a future increase in real estate taxes; Hardy said that was false. Morgan said that Hardy had not increase social services in Ward 7; Hardy said that was false. The editorial board of The Washington Post endorsed Hardy's reelection. Hardy won the Democratic Party primary election with 61% of the vote.

In the general election, she was challenged by Republican Virginia Morris, a former member of the District of Columbia Board of Education living in Good Hope; and Independent Wilmur A. Davis, a civil engineer and Advisory Neighborhood Commissioner living in Fort Davis. Hardy was reelected for a four-year term, receiving 83 percent of the vote in the general election.

Community Task Force for the Safety of Children and Youth, led by Hardy, received a grant from the District of Columbia for task force programs. In 1978, the District of Columbia brought a lawsuit against the organization, saying the organization had not provided documentation that it had spent the grant funds for the grant's intended purpose. Hardy had signed the checks disbursing the funds for the grant. The District also said the organization had not contributed enough of its own funds towards the program as it was required to do in accordance with the grant agreement it had signed. Hardy said the lawsuit was politically motivated retribution for her support of Sterling Tucker's candidacy for mayor.

In 1979, Hardy introduced a bill to change the law for workers compensation. The Greater Washington Central Labor Council criticized the bill, saying injured workers would no longer be able to choose their own doctors; presume the employee was not injured on the job unless evidence proves otherwise; eliminate benefits for employees who are partially disabled; and cap the compensation that would go to a spouse of an employee who had died while working. Hardy defended the bill, saying that it was intended to help small businesses and minority-owed businesses by reducing the cost of workers compensation insurance. Workers compensation insurance costs had indeed increased for businesses in the District due to new legislation passed by United States Congress. Hardy said the bill was her own work, but large portions of it had actually been taken from lobbying documents from the Washington Board of Trade. The Council voted in to pass the bill later that year.

On June 30, 1980, Hardy announced she would not run again for reelection. Instead she would start a consulting firm that would contract with the federal government to examine urban policy programs.

== Death ==
Hardy died of bone cancer at a hospice facility in Washington, D.C., on August 18, 2007.

== Electoral history ==
=== 1974 ===
Council of the District of Columbia, Ward 7, Democratic primary election, 1974
Party	Candidate	Votes	%
Democratic	Willie J. Hardy	3,700	30
Democratic	Bart S. Hall Jr.	3,077	25
Democratic	James T. Speight Jr.	2,966	24
Democratic	William O. Woodson	1,152	9
Democratic	Portia Carson	575	5
Democratic	William D. Jackson	485	4
Democratic	Arthur Z. Reddick	272	2
Democratic	Idus Holmes	161	1

Council of the District of Columbia, Ward 7, general election, 1974
Party	Candidate	Votes	%
Democratic	Willie J. Hardy	9,983	80
Republican	John West	884	7
Independent	J. Purnell Pinkney	797	6
Independent	Durand Adrian Ford	315	3
Independent	Sarah Mills	290	2
	Write-in	216	2

=== 1976 ===
Council of the District of Columbia, Ward 7, Democratic primary election, 1976
Party	Candidate	Votes	%
Democratic	Willie J. Hardy	3,937	61
Democratic	Barbara A. Morgan	1,712	27
Democratic	Walter Bayard	776	12

Council of the District of Columbia, Ward 7, general election, 1976
Party	Candidate	Votes	%
Democratic	Willie J. Hardy	15,281	83
Republican	Virginia Morris	2,029	11
Independent	Wilmur A. Davis	1,119	6

Council of the District of Columbia
Preceded by Douglas E. Moore	Chair pro tempore of the Council of the District of Columbia; 1977–1979	Succeeded by Nadine Winter
