= Hocutt v. Wilson =

American desegregation case

Hocutt v. Wilson, N.C. Super. Ct. (1933) (unreported), was the first attempt to desegregate higher education in the United States. It was initiated by two African American lawyers from Durham, North Carolina, Conrad O. Pearson and Cecil McCoy, with the support of the National Association for the Advancement of Colored People (NAACP). The case was ultimately dismissed for lack of standing, but it served as a test case for challenging the "separate but equal" doctrine in education and was a precursor to Brown v. Board of Education, 347 U.S. 483 (1954) (holding that segregated public schools were unconstitutional).

== Background ==
Students at the North Carolina College for Negroes, which is now North Carolina Central University in Durham, were plaintiffs in desegregation suits against the all-white University of North Carolina system. North Carolina was an ideal place for civil rights work because Durham had a generally non-violent racial status quo, the state was slightly more progressive than other Deep South states, and it was close to Washington D.C., where Charles Hamilton Houston taught the most prominent civil rights lawyers.

The plaintiff was Thomas Hocutt, a 24-year-old student at the North Carolina College for Negroes and graduate of Hillside High School. Hocutt wanted to become a pharmacist, having worked for many years at a local drugstore, and the University of North Carolina at Chapel Hill had the only pharmacy program in the area. Attorneys Conrad Odell Pearson and Cecil McCoy and journalist Louis Austin had been seeking out potential litigants to test racial segregation in higher education. Hocutt agreed to be the plaintiff, a decision historian Jerry Gershenhorn describes as courageous, due to the potential for white backlash. Six years later, as Thurgood Marshall and the NAACP were looking for just such a plaintiff in Virginia, they were "unable to get a qualified applicant with courage to apply".

Pearson graduated from Howard University's law school under Charles Hamilton Houston and began practicing in Durham in 1932. McCoy graduated from Brooklyn Law School in 1931 and also practiced in Durham.

== Beginning the suit ==
Pearson and McCoy brought the case in February 1933. In March 1933, Hocutt sought admission to the program. Initially, they wrote to NAACP General Secretary Walter Francis White for financial support. White ratified the case and sent a copy of the Margold Report on discrimination in public schools to support the attorneys. On Charles Hamilton Houston's recommendation, the NAACP also sent Harvard-educated William Hastie to assist Pearson and McCoy on the case. At the trial, Hastie became the lead lawyer.

The suit did not have the support of many black leaders in Durham. But it was supported by Austin, the editor of the city's major black-owned newspaper, The Carolina Times. James E. Shepard, president and founder of North Carolina College for Negroes did not support the lawsuit, because he wanted the state to fund graduate programs for black students at his university. Shepard refused to release Hocutt's transcript. The white-owned newspaper, Durham Morning Herald warned, "[t]o our way of thinking, [Pearson and McCoy] will find in the end that they have won not a victory but a costly defeat."

When Hastie, Pearson and McCoy failed to present an official transcript, Hocutt no longer satisfied the admission requirements for the Pharmacy School and the case was dismissed. Despite defeat, the Hocutt case laid the groundwork for subsequent civil rights cases that challenged racial segregation in public education, leading to the landmark Brown v. Board of Education (1954) decision, which ruled that racially segregated public schools were unconstitutional.
