= Royal Ice Cream sit-in =

1957 American protest against segregation

The Royal Ice Cream sit-in was a nonviolent protest in Durham, North Carolina, that led to a court case on the legality of segregated facilities. The demonstration took place on June 23, 1957, when a group of African American protesters, led by Reverend Douglas E. Moore, entered the Royal Ice Cream Parlor and sat in the section reserved for white patrons. When asked to move, the protesters refused and were arrested for trespassing. The case was appealed unsuccessfully to the County and State Superior Courts.

The sit-in sparked debates within the African American communities in Durham about the strategies of civil rights activism. It also helped to spark future protests such as the Greensboro sit-ins and to promote coordination among African American civil rights activists across the Southeast.

== Historical context ==
In 1896, the United States Supreme Court decision Plessy v. Ferguson upheld the constitutionality of racial segregation of public facilities under the doctrine of "separate but equal". The separation in practice led to inferior conditions for African Americans, especially in the Southern states.

Meanwhile, Durham had a reputation throughout the South as a "unique town… that is more liberal than what you would expect in a Southern state," according to Durham native and civil rights leader Pauli Murray. In Durham, racial conflicts were arguably less severe than in other Southern towns and African Americans enjoyed more opportunities, including in the city's many tobacco plants. Prominent leaders established their own businesses and developed a prosperous black neighborhood called the Hayti District, which had its own store, theaters, restaurants and hospital. However, as in much of the South, Jim Crow laws were still rooted in Durham, with segregation resulting in inferior facilities and housing, fewer employment opportunities for African Americans. Separated by the city's railroad tracks, black and white neighborhoods contrasted greatly in standards of living.

== Events and sentiments leading to the sit-in ==
In Durham, the struggle to end racial segregation was spurred by the creation of the Durham Committee on Negro Affairs (DCNA) in 1935. During the 1930s and 1940s, the DCNA helped raise the number of blacks registered to vote. It also worked to increase job opportunities for blacks and to promote black candidates for elected and appointed positions in Durham. However, after World War II, much of the progress in blacks' professional advancement was reversed, and many from the young generation were forced back into lower-wage positions. At the same time, this younger generation was also becoming dissatisfied with the DCNA's mild, pacifistic approach to the problem of segregation in Durham. A week before the sit-in, Louis E. Austin, editor of Durham's African American newspaper Carolina Times and a supporter of Moore's, wrote: "This newspaper senses a stagnation that is beginning to creep over the Durham Committee on Negro Affairs which, if allowed to continue, is certain to spell its doom…. The DCNA is becoming too high-brow, too soft and too compromising." Austin continued in this editorial to call for "new blood, new faces and new ideas".

Rev. Douglas E. Moore, a pastor at the Asbury Temple United Methodists Church, had been active in the desegregation movement in Durham during the 1950s. Prior to the sit-in, he had petitioned the City Council for an end to segregation at Durham Public Library and the Carolina Theater. On June 13, 1957, he and his family attempted to gain admission to the all-white Long Meadow Park swimming pool. When they were denied, he immediately appealed unsuccessfully to city recreation officers.

== Role of the Black Church ==
Rev. Moore studied Theology at Boston University, where he was a classmate of Martin Luther King Jr. In an October 3, 1956 letter to King, Moore proposed that "[a] regional group which uses the power of nonviolence would help give us direction on national movements". Like other religious leaders of the era, Moore recognized the central role of the church within black communities, particularly in organizing political movements. Sociologist Aldon Morris has supported this view of the church in relation to community-building, stating: "The church was functioning as the institutional vanguard of a mass based black movement". Long before the Royal Ice Cream Sit-in, community leaders such as Moore began to form alliances in order to promote a national movement. Using the church as an organizational base, they started to train young activists to be "professional" non-violent protesters. This practice was later noted by one of Moore's activist compatriots, Gordon Carey, who stated: "…When we reached these cities we went directly to the movement oriented churches." According to Carey, these churches were selected because they were "where the protest activities were being planned and organized."

In 1957 the organizers of the Southern Christian Leadership Conference (SCLC) sent out a call to fellow clergymen of the South to organize their congregations and local communities for collective protest. Around this time, Rev. Moore was rallying a group of young activists called "ACT", which included the Royal Ice Cream Sit-in participants. They met Sunday afternoons at Asbury Temple United Methodist Church, where Moore served as pastor, to talk about how to "push the envelope of Jim Crow’s Law."

== Sit-in and trial ==
At approximately 6:45PM on June 23, 1957, Rev. Moore led seven attendees from his Sunday session at Ashbury United into the segregated Royal Ice Cream Parlor, located nearby at the corner of Roxboro and Dowd Streets (1000 N. Roxboro Street). The group entered through the back door, sat in the section reserved for white patrons, and asked to be served. When busboy David Champion asked the group to move to the section reserved for black patrons, Moore asked to speak to the manager. The owner, Louis Coletta, then appeared and asked the group to either move to the other section or to leave; when the group refused, Coletta called the police. One member of the group left the premises before the police arrived. Police Lieutenant Wallace Upchurch led several officers in the arrest of the remaining seven. Now known as "the Royal Seven," the group included Mary Elizabeth Clyburn, Vivian Jones, Virginia Williams, Claude Glenn, Jesse W. Gray, and Melvin Willis, in addition to Rev. Moore.

At the Durham Recorder's Court the following day, the protesters were convicted of trespassing and fined 10 dollars each plus court costs. They were represented by William A.("Billy") Marsh Jr., a Durham Civil Rights attorney. They immediately appealed the case to the Durham County Superior Court. On July 16, 1957, after a 24-minute deliberation, the all-white jury of the Superior Court upheld the guilty verdict and fined the protesters an additional 25 dollars each. The case moved up to the State Supreme Court, where the protesters again lost their case on January 10, 1958. Associate Justice William B. Rodman said the 14th Amendment prohibits discriminatory actions by states but "erects no shield against merely private conduct, however, discriminatory or wrongful." The group then appealed the case to the U.S. Supreme Court, which refused to hear their case.

In a 1957 interview, Moore maintained that the sit-in had not been a planned protest, stating: "we went to the ice cream parlor for ice cream, nothing else." However, a later source indicates that Moore may have deliberately chosen Royal Ice Cream as a protest venue because of its location in a predominantly black neighborhood; this source quotes him thusly: "I thought I could isolate them in the black community."

Sparked by the Royal Ice Cream incident, local protests continued in and around Durham for years, mainly led and inspired by Rev. Moore and Floyd McKissick, a black attorney and prominent community leader. They also began a six-year struggle to integrate the parlor. This struggle culminated in 1963, when Coletta sold the business and Royal Ice Cream became integrated.

== Short-term impacts ==
This first attempt at desegregation provoked a controversy within the black community in Durham, because the young activists threatened the delicate balance that had been cautiously maintained by the leadership of DCNA. Other well-established organizations such as Durham's black Ministerial Alliance and the Durham NAACP also criticized Moore's "radical" efforts. At that time, the local NAACP was still fighting for a prolonged legal struggle against Durham's school segregation, and worried that losing the case might set a dangerous legal precedent and also divert the organization's energy. In brief, the more experienced black leaders in Durham viewed the sit-in as a premature and risky act led by a radical, young outsider.

Despite all these initial doubts, the 1957 sit-in sparked within the Durham black community a serious debate on strategies for future protests. The Durham Committee on Negro Affairs’ Economic Committee, headed by Floyd McKissick and Nathaniel White Sr., discussed whether to launch a boycott of the ice cream parlor. However, several committee members questioned the approach, because the owner of Royal Ice Cream Parlor, Louis Coletta, was an Italian Immigrant. Even Rev. Moore himself, who supported the boycott proposal, admitted that Coletta was "a member of a minority group" and that his parlor might not be the ideal target. Although DCNA and other organizations did not back up the protesters, the sit-in did prompt them to reevaluate their roles in dismantling Jim Crow. It also encouraged community-wide black boycotts and direct actions, which were forerunners of later collective movements.

This unsuccessful attempt did inspire a surge of youth enthusiasm, as black students continued to carry out the most active protests and challenge the conservatism of Durham's elder and privileged African American circles. A group of high school NAACP members, more than half of them girls, organized regular pickets outside the Royal Ice Cream Parlor, under the direction of Floyd McKissick. The students refused to place their hopes in the protracted process of seeking justice in the courts. Nor did they trust the slow and quiet diplomacy adopted by the black elites. The Royal Ice Cream Sit-in spread the idea of direct action among Durham's black students. Though it did not immediately initiate subversion, the sit-in encouraged a mass of students to take initiatives in concrete actions, and these sentiments paved road for future movements. The continuation of the sit-ins and other forms of non-violent resistance eventually succeeded. In 1960, the Mayor's Committee on Human Relations revealed a planned program for desegregation of Durham lunch counters and Durham officially became the seventh town in North Carolina to integrate its lunch counter service. Desegregation was effected starting on a limited basis, and mass demonstrations by Durham blacks continued to 1963 when public facilities were finally desegregated.

== Long-term significance ==
The sit-in had significant influence on the strategies used by civil rights activists in the Southeast during the 1960s. It revealed the shortcomings of unpublicized, spur-of-the-moment protests and also highlighted the challenges faced by black protestors in the legal and media contexts of the time. For the Royal Seven, these challenges included the all-white Superior Court jury and the sparse journalistic coverage. While the Durham Morning Herald featured the sit-in on the front page, the story was buried inside the Raleigh News and Observer and did not appear at all in the Carolina Times until a month later. There was little coverage of the sit-in on a national scale.

The sit-in also encouraged leaders to organize "local movement centers" that encouraged coordination among civil rights activists across the Southeast. As noted above, local activists like Moore had been developing "direct action" organizations throughout the South during the 1950s. But since the Royal Ice Cream Sit-in, Moore realized the importance of alliances between these black "movement centers" in the South. Moore and McKissick began planning a nationwide sit-in movement that would start from Durham. During that time, they contacted activists in other "movement centers" throughout North Carolina, South Carolina and Virginia, urging them to train students for sit-ins. After the Greensboro sit-ins, activists contacted their counterparts in other cities, assessing their readiness for action; for example, on February 3, 1960, Moore spoke with Nashville civil rights activist James M. Lawson, urging him to speed his efforts toward the desegregation of Woolworth. That spring, sit-ins took place across the Southern states. In 1960, Moore famously attested to the seriousness of the sit-in movement with the statement: "If Woolworth and other stores think that this is just another panty raid, they haven't had their sociologists in the field recently."

== Commemoration and memory ==
The Royal Ice Cream Sit-in was largely overshadowed by the later Greensboro sit-ins, the latter of which were generally regarded as the nation's first sit-ins. In 1979, a debate developed around whether a commemorative marker of the first sit-in belonged in Durham or Greensboro; Blackwell M. "Dog" Brogden, one of the prosecutors from the 1957 Recorder's Court case, stated to the press that the marker belonged in Durham. Starting in 1979, at least four unsuccessful attempts were made to create a marker at the Royal Ice Cream Parlor site. Initially, North Carolina's Highway Historic Marker Committee maintained that the Royal Ice Cream Sit-in "did not have enough significance." Durham citizens, however, felt that the event was central to the city's civil rights history. In 2007, the NC Highway Historic Marker Committee reversed its previous position, acknowledging the importance of the Sit-in, and approving a commemorative marker. That year, a marker was placed at the site with the inscription: "ROYAL ICE CREAM SIT-IN: Segregation protest at an ice cream parlor on this site, June 23, 1957, led to court case testing dual racial facilities."

== See also ==
- Sit-in movement - list of sit-ins

== Bibliography ==
- Anderson, Jean Bradley (2011). Durham County: a History of Durham County, North Carolina. Durham, NC: Duke University Press. ISBN 978-0-8223-4983-9.
- Davidson, Osha Gray (2007). The Best of Enemies: Race and Redemption in the New South. Chapel Hill, NC: University of North Carolina Press. ISBN 978-0-8078-5869-1.
- Greene, Christina (1996). ""In the best interest of the total community"?: women-in-action and the problems of building interracial, cross-class alliances in Durham, North Carolina, 1968–1975". Frontiers: A Journal of Women Studies. 16 (2/3): 190–217. doi:10.2307/3346808. JSTOR 3346808.
- Greene, Christina (2005). Our Separate Ways: Women and the Black Freedom Movement in Durham, North Carolina. Chapel Hill, NC: University of North Carolina Press. ISBN 978-0-8078-5600-0.
- Hughes, Richard A. (2009). "Boston University School of Theology and the Civil Rights Movement". Methodist History. 47 (3): 146–161. hdl:10516/210.
- Klarman, Michael J. (2004). From Jim Crow to Civil Rights: the Supreme Court and the Struggle for Racial Equality. Oxford: Oxford University Press. ISBN 9780199880928.
- Morris, Aldon (1981). "Black Southern Student Sit-in Movement: an Indigenous Perspective". CRSO Working Paper. 234. hdl:2027.42/51008.
- Murray, Pauli (1987). Autobiography of a Black Activist, Feminist, Lawyer, Priest, and Poet (4th ed.). Knoxville, TN: University of Tennessee Press. ISBN 9780870495960.
- Walton, Grace (2000). "Black women in Durham politics, 1950–1996: from grassroots to electoral politics". New England Journal of Public Policy. 15 (2): 61–86.
- Wise, Jim (2002). Durham: a Bull City Story. Charleston, SC: Arcadia. ISBN 9780738523811.
