= Syosset High School =

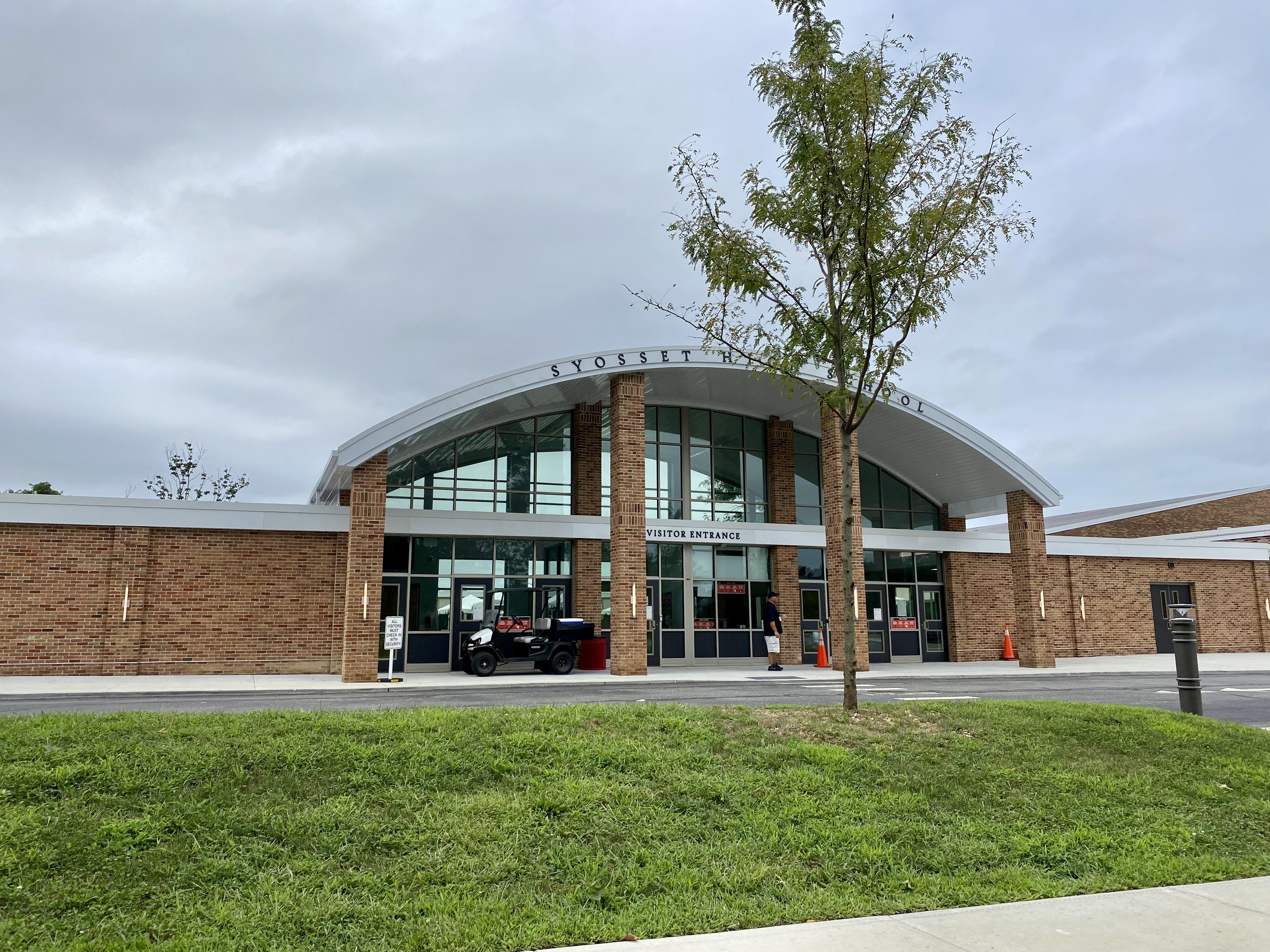
- The visitor's entrance at Syosset High School, seen in 2021

Location
- 70 South Woods Road; Syosset, New York 11791; United States; 40°49′50.98″N 73°28′58.49″W

Information
- Type: Public school
- Motto: "A great place to live, an outstanding place to learn"
- Established: 1956; 70 years ago
- School district: Syosset Central School District
- NCES School ID: 362856003843
- Principal: Giovanni Durante
- Faculty: 224.22 FTEs
- Enrollment: 2,266 (as of 2022–23)
- Student to teacher ratio: 10.11
- Campus type: Suburban: Large
- Colors: Red; Black; White
- Team name: Braves
- Website: https://shs.syossetschools.org/

Syosset High School (SHS) is a public high school located in Syosset, New York, United States, in Nassau County, on Long Island. It serves as the sole high school of the Syosset Central School District.

As of the 2021–22 school year, the school had an enrollment of 2,234 students, with approximately 559 students per graduating class, and 214.9 classroom teachers (on an FTE basis), for a student–teacher ratio of 10.4:1. As of 2024, the student body had approximately 49.2% minority enrollment; 50.8% of students were white, while 42.0% were Asian, 5.0% were Hispanic, 1.3% were two or more races, and 0.7% were African-American. There were 213 students (9.5% of enrollment) eligible for free lunch and 20 (0.9% of students) eligible for reduced-cost lunch.

The school district as a whole was the 2002 winner of the Kennedy Center Alliance for Arts Education Network and National School Boards Association Award, which honors school districts for excellence in arts education. Syosset was also named a Grammy Signature school for its music programs in orchestra, band, and chorus. In 2010, it was rated 14th in the country for music education by the National Association for Music Education.

== Athletics ==
- The boys' swim team has been undefeated since the 2015–16 season, going 70–0 in the dual meet season of 2023. The team won its 5th straight Conference 1 title and Nassau County Championships in 2019, 2021, 2022, and 2024.
- The football team won the 1974 New York State Championship and the Long Island Championship in 2014.
- The boys' cross country team won ten back-to-back Nassau County titles from 1996 to 2006. The cross country and track and field teams have won eleven back-to-back county titles from 2012 to 2016. On February 5, 2005, athletes Chris Howell, Adam Lampert, Dan Tully and Sean Tully set the national indoor record in the 4 × 800 metres relay in a time of 7:42.22. The same team won national championships at the National Scholastic Indoor Championships and Nike Outdoor Nationals and won the 4 × 800 metres relay at the Penn Relays on April 29, 2005.

== Substitute Enrichment Program ==
In the 1970s, the high school was known for the Substitute Enrichment Program. Funds that would have gone to pay a substitute teacher were instead used to help bring in special guest speakers and class-long programs. When a teacher was absent, students had the option to attend the sub program or go to study hall. Guest speakers included sports figures and artists. For instance, alumni recall seeing Isaac Asimov talking with the late Harry Chapin in the school's Little Theater.

== Breaking Borders ==
In the 2010s, Syosset students created a program titled Breaking Borders, which works to mitigate racial and socioeconomic boundaries on Long Island. Since its founding, the program has significantly grown to include schools from all around Long Island, including Freeport High School.

== Notable alumni ==
- Judd Apatow – screenwriter, director, and producer
- Lesley Arfin – television writer and author, Girls, Love, Brooklyn 99
- Vito Arujau – NCAA Division I All-American wrestler
- Jay Bienstock – Emmy award-winning television producer of Survivor, The Apprentice, and The Voice
- Sue Bird –Israeli-American Women's National Basketball Association point guard, four-time WNBA champion, five-time Olympic champion, thirteen-time All-Star (Seattle Storm) (She attended Syosset High School but graduated from Christ the King Regional High School)
- Alan Blinder – economist, author, and former Vice Chairman of the Board of Governors of the Federal Reserve System
- Rosa Brooks – writer, law professor, former Department of Defense staff member (formerly known as Rosa Ehrenreich)
- Elaine Chao – former Secretary of Transportation, former Secretary of Labor, first Asian-Pacific American woman to be appointed a cabinet member
- George Drakoulias – music producer, music supervisor
- Ben Ehrenreich – journalist and novelist
- Alan Eichler – theatrical publicist, producer and talent manager
- Sibel Galindez – actress
- Paul Ginsparg – physicist
- Jerry Gershenhorn – historian
- Brooke Gladstone – journalist and media analyst
- Wayne Gladstone – writer and humorist
- Rick Hodes – medical doctor known for work in the developing world
- Brenda Howard – political activist
- Michael Isikoff – Newsweek journalist
- Kathleen Kim – puppeteer behind the Sesame Street character Ji-Young, the show's first Asian American Muppet
- Mitchell Lazar – physician-scientist
- Kenneth Lin – playwright
- Jon Lovett – former presidential speechwriter for Barack Obama and current podcast host
- Carolyne Mas – singer-songwriter
- Robert Maschio – actor, Scrubs
- Idina Menzel – actress and singer
- Aram Moghaddassi – engineer and government official
- Ed Newman – National Football League All-Pro football player
- Mac O'Keefe –Premier Lacrosse League National Lacrosse League All Time leading Goal Scorer in NCAA D1 lacrosse history
- Jeff Panzer – music video executive
- Adam Pascal – actor and singer
- Bruce Pecheur – model and actor
- Michael Pollan – writer
- Tracy Pollan – actress
- Natalie Portman – Israeli-American actress
- Felissa Rose – actress
- Liz Rosenberg – poet, novelist, children's book author
- Gabe Rotter – novelist, television writer and producer
- Jim Rowinski – NBA player
- Dave Rubin – television personality and political commentator, host of The Rubin Report
- John C. Russell – playwright
- Carl Safina – conservationist and author
- Doug Stegmeyer – bassist in Billy Joel's band
- Brandon Taubman – baseball executive, former assistant general manager for the Houston Astros
- Doug Varone – choreographer
- Barry Weiss – Chairman of BMG Label Group
- Meg Wolitzer – novelist
- Irad Young – American-Israeli soccer player
- Jordan Young – television producer and writer
