= Louis Austin =

American journalist, civic leader and social activist

- Born: 1898
- Died: 1971 (aged 72–73)
- Occupations: Journalist, Newspaper publisher

Louis Austin (1898-1971) was an African-American journalist, civic leader and social activist. Austin purchased The Carolina Times in 1927 and transformed it into an institution that aided African Americans in their fight for freedom and equality in North Carolina. He used a new approach to civil rights issues in Durham, incorporating lower and middle class blacks, unlike the moderate, accommodationist approach of the black elite in Durham during this time. Austin's unusual strategy of advocating for the majority of blacks to have a voice in society succeeded in galvanizing a broader segment of the African American community in Durham to act for social change. Austin's approach to black activism helped lay the groundwork for the modern Civil Rights Movement in Durham in the late 1950s and 1960s, which also encouraged lower-income blacks to become politically active. His strategies—which were once considered too radical by his peers—allowed Austin to maintain his influence in Durham well into the 1950s and 1960s. In doing so, Austin created a lasting impact for Durham.

== Early life ==
Louis Austin was born in Enfield, North Carolina, a small town eighty-five miles east of Durham. He grew up in a period when African Americans were denied basic civil liberties, including the right to vote. Throughout Austin's childhood, his father William taught him to stand up for his rights. As a young adult, Austin was enraged about racial discrimination, and spoke out about these types of injustices at his school. As a result, his parents sent him to finish his high school education at the Joseph K. Brick School in Edgecombe County. Austin then attended the National Training School (now North Carolina Central University) in Durham, North Carolina. After graduating college, Austin worked for the North Carolina Mutual Life Insurance Company, a black-owned company based in Durham.

== History of the Black Press ==
Since Freedom's Journal, the first black newspaper, was founded in 1827, the black press served as an outlet for African Americans to define their own identity, create a sense of unity, present events from a black perspective, highlight black achievements that the mainstream press ignore, and most importantly, work for black equality. In the late 1800s and early 1900s, Booker T. Washington, who was considered the preeminent spokesman for black America during this time period, shared his accommodationist political ideologies in the black press throughout the country. He wielded great power among the black press by clandestinely controlling advertisements, loans, and political subsidies. Many black newspapers at the time relied on Washington's financial support and therefore were obligated to write editorials that he favored. Myrdal defined the black press as an instrument of the "Negro upper classes" for spreading conservative values, and establishing group control and identity.

=== Significance in Durham ===
By the 1920s, black America came to a fork in the road and had to choose whether to accommodate white societal viewpoints or oppose them. W. E. B. Du Bois opposed the white mainstream point of view. Durham was a microcosm of this national black debate, and black elites in Durham were champions of Washington's accommodationist strategy. The newspaper published by the North Carolina Mutual Life Insurance Company, owned by Charles Clinton Spaulding, a leading member of the black elite in Durham, was quite open about the company's determination to resist W. E. B. Du Bois's call for an aggressive challenge to white rule.

Louis Austin began working at The Carolina Times in 1921, when it was called The Standard Advertiser. Upon joining the paper, he made it clear that he was committed to writing articles that were closely aligned with Du Bois' approach. Austin bought The Times in 1927, with the help of a loan from Durham's black-owned Mechanics and Farmers Bank. During the early twentieth century, black journalists like Austin played an essential role in the struggle for black equality in America. Austin worked as editor for the Times until his death in 1971.

== Austin's Civil Rights Activism ==
=== The Carolina Times ===
Louis Austin worked tirelessly to shape The Carolina Times into a vehicle for change for the African American community. He used the paper to reenergize the civil rights activism. African Americans who lived in Durham and the surrounding areas relied on their weekly subscription to inform them of issues that impacted the African American community. The paper's motto was "The Truth Unbridled", because Austin's mission was to provide North Carolinian African Americans the unadulterated truth about contemporary situations and events. Austin's honest and straightforward approach gave him credibility and strong support in Durham, North Carolina and throughout the state. During a time period when Jim Crow laws ruled the South, and white supremacy was prevalent, Austin understood that it was necessary to directly confront the problems African Americans were facing and provided a voice for these problems. The Carolina Times was influential as it created an open dialogue amongst blacks in Durham, surrounding areas in North Carolina, and throughout the nation.

==== Austin's New Strategy ====
Louis Austin worked towards achieving racial equality for blacks, regardless of their socio-economic status, by approaching discriminatory policies with a new, confrontational strategy. Austin shared the political philosophies of Du Bois and Frederick Douglass, both of whom advocated protest as a political tool in the struggle for equal rights. He realized that confrontation and defiance, not civility and accommodation, were needed to break white supremacy's stronghold in the South. The civil rights movement in Durham during the early 1900s was controlled by wealthy blacks, primarily Spaulding and James Shepherd, president of North Carolina College for Negroes (now known as North Carolina Central University). These black elites were known as the "Big Negroes;" they were intent on maintaining peaceful race relations in Durham and did not want to promote campaigns that would upset powerful white people in Durham and throughout the country. Confrontational policies would agitate race relations in North Carolina and jeopardize the businesses and enterprises these "Big Negroes" controlled; therefore, they saw no benefit pursuing policies in that interfered with a system in which they were economically and somewhat socially comfortable.

The direction toward which the black elite steered the civil rights movement was based on their own economic self-interests. These were not representative of the majority of the black community in Durham who were unemployed due to racial inequalities and unable to receive education. According to historian Freddie Parker, Durham "was a diverse community that needed more than one black leader." Austin was extremely frustrated with the conservative black leaders in Durham; therefore, he strove to create a racially tolerant environment in Durham for all African Americans. Austin's outspoken editorials in The Carolina Times divulged African American inequalities, and helped galvanize the African American community to focus on activism.

=== The Great Depression Era ===
Throughout the 1930s, Austin displayed his commitment to the African American masses in Durham through his efforts to bring about social and political change in many different areas. He led voter campaigns, advocated for the integration of public schools, lobbied for equal pay for black teachers and equal funding for black schools, denounced police brutality, and demanded equal employment opportunity for African Americans. Education was exceptionally important to Austin because he saw education as a crucial prerequisite for blacks to rise above racial inequalities. Austin worked tirelessly to fight for equal education opportunities, and unlike more cautious black leaders in North Carolina, did not hesitate to advocate legal action to enforce equity in education.

Austin's first major action in promoting equal opportunities in education in North Carolina occurred in 1933, when he joined with black lawyers Conrad Pearson and Cecil McCoy to back Thomas Hocutt, in the lawsuit Hocutt v. Wilson, to challenge University of North Carolina's (UNC) decision to deny Hocutt's application for admission on the basis of his race. Moderate black elites, such as Spaulding, tried to convince Austin and the other black lawyers to drop the case because they wanted to maintain good relations with white state leaders in order to ensure their economic well-being. Austin displayed his commitment to legal action when he said: "If my actions will cause a race riot, you had better grease up your muskets for I am going back Monday to pursue this cause." While Austin and the other black lawyers lost in court, according to Jerry Gershenhorn, the case was significant in the larger context because it marked a turning point in the African American struggle for equal rights and social injustice. The old order of the South would no longer go unchallenged by African Americans in North Carolina. Courageous activists, like Austin, were committed to utilizing the judicial system to challenge racial inequalities. Hocutt v. Wilson laid the foundation for future political legal actions, and served as the opening salvo in the NAACP's legal battle to overturn public education, ultimately culminating in the Brown v. Board of Education decision. The case also served as a point of entry for the NAACP into North Carolina.

Louis Austin believed that African Americans could achieve better rights while working within the confines of the political system. Austin viewed political participation as a means for blacks to voice their concerns, and if the masses of the black community were politically engaged, they would be able to attain better rights. In 1928, there were only fifty black registered voters in Durham. Austin constantly embraced community mobilization in both local and national politics. Beginning in the late 1920s, Austin worked to directly confront restricts, such as literacy tests, that white supremacists imposed in order to keep blacks from voting. For example, in 1932, Austin led a "state-wide non-partisan political conference" in Durham, which attempted to foster black interest in voting, and address the difficulties blacks faced in getting to the polls. Austin recognized that the Republican Party was no longer the "Black Man's Party," and that for African Americans, the key to gaining influence in North Carolina and throughout the South was through the Democratic Party. In 1934, Austin displayed his newfound commitment to Democratic Party when he and Frederick K. Watkins ran on the Democratic ticket and were elected justices of the peace in Durham. Throughout the country, the black press applauded their victory as a turning point for African American involvement in politics: "For the first time in the history of the South, two colored men were elected to office on the Democratic ticket." Moreover, Austin's victory had important long term significance. After Austin won, the local head of the Democratic party tried to persuade him to back down; however, Austin remained adamant about serving in office. Austin thus "established a precedent" for blacks serving as justices of the peace in Durham. While Austin did not obtain a powerful political position, according to Joseph Cannon, Austin's victory represented the success in African American's faltering first steps in politics in Durham.

Another pivotal turning point in black political influence occurred in 1935, when Austin joined with Shepard and Spaulding to form the Durham Committee on Negro Affairs, known as the DCNA. The DCNA dedicated itself to improving African Americans' economic, social, and educational opportunities, and served as a means for African Americans in Durham to enter the political arena. The DCNA proved effective in registering blacks to vote. Black voter registration in Durham doubled in the year after the organization was founded, and by 1939, there were three thousand black voters in the city.

=== World War II Era (1940s) ===
==== Double V Strategy ====
When the United States entered World War II, Austin seized the opportunity and implemented the Double V campaign. Austin joined other black newspapers in articulating this dual strategy in which blacks fought for victory abroad against the Axis powers while fighting for victory at home against the forces of white supremacy. The campaign revealed the hypocrisy in America's supposed "war for democracy" abroad and attack on the Nazi's discriminatory ideology by publicizing racial oppression at home. While some southern black editors, such as P.B. Young of the Norfolk Journal and Guide, refused to directly attack segregation, Louis Austin was the leading proponent of the Double V strategy in North Carolina and demanded the end of racial segregation. One example Austin used to back the Double V campaign was how Americans condemned Japanese soldiers for committing atrocities against Americans, but they found nothing wrong with lynching African-Americans. From the outset of World War II, Austin relentlessly attacked the government for "all forms of discrimination, and advocated for equal access for blacks in all branches of the armed forces. He expressed the absurdity of African Americans fighting for the right to put their lives at risk and defend their country. Moreover, Austin criticized conservative black leaders who did not condemn racial segregation in the armed forces. At an October 1942 meeting amongst black leaders in Durham intended to work on issuing a Durham Manifesto, conservative leaders such as Spaulding, Shephard and Young, expressed their disagreement with "the principle and practice of compulsory segregation in our American society;" however, they worried that if they endorsed outright rejection of racial segregation in the manifesto, it would create white backlash.

The American government—concerned about losing support for the war on the domestic front—began to criticize attacks from black activists and the black press and sought to put an end to the Double-V campaign. Due to government pressure and surveillance, many black newspapers moderated their editorials. However, despite government pressure, Austin remained resolute in his support for the Double-V campaign. According to Austin's daughter, an FBI agent once came to The Carolina Times office, and Austin completely disregarded his concerns, and the FBI never returned. Even when faced with challenges from the American government, Austin remained dedicated to the cause he believed in and refused to give in to pressure. Austin's role in World War II is noteworthy; Timothy B. Tyson in his book Radio Free Dixie refers to Austin "as the most prominent 'racial agitator'" during World War II."

The race riots of 1943 -- which erupted in over forty cities including Durham -- also factored into the growing sentiment amongst black activists to tone down their criticisms. However, Austin remained determined to the Double V strategy, and instead, used the violent uprisings to further his criticism by publicizing the harm that segregation was causing throughout the country. In June 1943, Austin expressed that "the law of segregation" was the root cause behind racial conflict in North Carolina. He believed that the riot in Durham represented the need for Durham to hire black police. While Austin utilized the race riots to demonstrate significant changes that were necessary in Durham and America, he publicly condemned the blacks who participated in the riots for their lawless behavior. He urged blacks to pursue peaceful methods to end racial segregation. One method Austin advocated was telling every African American to write letters to their mayor, their governor, and their president, and peacefully declare their frustrations through the power of words. Throughout the war, Austin taught other African Americans the importance of pursuing nonviolent methods when fighting segregation, such as publicly voicing their concerns instead. Austin, by implementing the Double-V campaign, "spurred a growing militant movement that would bear more fruit after the war."

==== Post-World War II ====
After World War II, Austin continued to directly confront issues African Americans were facing, and began to see some results from his hard work. For instance, in 1953, businessman and DCNA leader R.N. Harris was elected to the Durham City Council. Harris was the first African American to serve on the city council, and following the elections, The Carolina Times wrote that "[h]istory was made in Durham…as the first Negro councilman in the city's 100 year-old history was sworn in." During the mid 1950s, the DCNA was seen as "the South's most effective black political machine." Furthermore, after more than two decades of campaigning for desegregation in schools, the Brown v. Board of Education decision made Austin's dream to dismantle legal segregation of education a reality.

=== Modern Civil Rights Era ===
Unlike older, conservative black activists, Austin sustained his position in the forefront of the movement for justice and equal opportunity during the modern Civil Rights Movement. Austin recognized the importance of joining with the younger generation of activists because they would be the face of the new movement, and it was crucial to steer them in the right way. In the 1950s, when the NAACP wanted to increase its membership, particularly to attract more young participants, The Carolina Times played a key role in getting people to join. During the 1950s and 1960s, Austin joined with a new generation of activists in support of the desegregation of public schools, lunch counters, and restaurants, equal access to employment opportunities, and voting rights.

As the new generation of activists joined the movement the rift between the conservative and progressive members of the movement became apparent in Durham, particularly through the frustrations surrounding the DCNA's moderate, gradualist approach. The younger, more radical members wanted to push the segregation question to the front and were becoming frustrated with the DCNA. Austin was conscious of the gap between the young activists and the old, wealthy black elite. He recognized the need for the DCNA to change its approach, and The Carolina Times served as a watchdog to inform the public of what he considered to be the "lethargy" of the DCNA's efforts to improve black's rights in Durham. In June 1957, Austin ran an outspoken editorial about the organization:

[T]his newspaper senses a stagnation that is beginning to creep over the Durham Committee on Negro Affairs which, if allowed to continue, is certain to spell its doom….[The DCNA] is becoming too high-brow, too soft and too compromise…. There comes a time in the life of an organization when it needs new blood, new faces and some new ideas. There comes a time when those who have been in control too long become satisfied to rest on their oars and boast of their past achievements…The struggle for freedom for all must go on. It must not be sacrificed on the altar of greed and power merely to obtain a few crumbs for the few. What we do now will determine the destiny of thousands who come after us. God forbid that we falter or recoil from performing our solemn duty.

Austin was calling on African Americans to join in a new and more aggressive struggle. Austin's editorial was deemed incredibly influential by Osha Gray Davidson in The Best of Enemies. Davidson stated, "If the civil rights movement of the 1960s was a second American Revolution, as some have called it, then Louis Austin was, especially in the crucible of North Carolina, its Thomas Paine, his stirring rhetoric pointing the way toward freedom at a crucial moment." The Royal Ice Cream sit-in, occurred in Durham a week after Austin published his editorial, and was the young activist's response to Austin's challenge toward a direct action strategy. Austin, alongside Douglas E. Moore and Floyd McKissick, continued to push the DCNA to pursue more forceful actions during the modern civil rights era.

==== Opposition to Black Nationalist Groups ====
While Austin rallied the masses to join with the new generation of activists in order to affect change, he denounced the black nationalist and separatist organizations that arose in the late 1950s and early 1960s and thought unlawful tactics were a necessary means to achieving their goals. Austin proclaimed that "The Carolina Times will not give its support to any person or group of persons advocating a resort to violence as a means of solving the black man's problems in this country or elsewhere." Instead, Austin believed that African Americans should work within the confines of the legal system to affect change. He had already seen society change tremendously throughout his lifetime. Austin believed that, "The pen is mightier than the sword," and throughout his life whenever he felt angry about racial injustices, he voiced them in The Carolina Times instead of resorting to violence. Austin displayed these sentiments in an editorial in the Times: "we call upon every Negro of sound judgment in this country to throw his support to that segment of the National Association for the Advancement of Colored People and other civil rights organizations that believe in and intend to practice law and order." Austin supported young, new movements whose philosophies were based on nonviolence, such as the Southern Christian Leadership Conference led by Martin Luther King Jr. Austin was a forerunner to these big movements, as they echoed extremely similar beliefs to those that he had been stressing since the early 1920s.

==== The movement's success ====
Throughout the 1960s, Austin saw the fruits of his lifetime of hard labor. One significant event in the 1960s was when Thurgood Marshall was selected the first African American on the United States Supreme Court. Austin had highlighted the importance of African American engagement in the political system his entire life, and Marshall's appointment to one of the most prominent institutions in the United States government was a testament to Austin's beliefs that blacks could achieve power in the political system. The Carolina Times printed that "The United States Supreme Court opened a historic term October 2, with the swearing of the first Negro justice in its 178-year history." The Carolina Times continued to publicize important milestones for the African American community.

== Impact ==
Austin continued to advocate for civil rights causes until he died on June 12, 1971. During his lifetime, he lived to see his lifework of devoted civil rights activism come full circle. He lobbied against white supremacy, the Jim Crow laws, racism, lynching, police brutality, employment discrimination, housing discrimination, segregation in schools, as well as other forms of racial discrimination. Durham historian Jean Anderson describes Austin as "an indefatigable crusader for justice and civil rights ... of a new class of blacks who kowtowed to no one, and he made the paper an unrelenting crusader for all black causes, including in his coverage news that bore on race relations from all over the nation." Austin used The Carolina Times to broadcast racial discriminations in order for them to be heard. After Austin died, a letter to the editor in a newspaper based in Virginia stated that Austin left "to Durham a rich heritage of unselfish service and a better community than it would have been otherwise." It is evident that Austin's impact was known throughout the South and the United States and not only in North Carolina.

Austin influenced Durham through his own undertakings during his own lifetime, and his actions continue to influence change in Durham to this day. Austin was able to teach the younger generation of activists what it meant to be a powerful leader, and these leaders were able to keep the movement alive. He taught them the importance of political engagement in order to effect change. Austin served as a paradigm for future black leaders about the importance of challenging the status quo, and not to be too scared to challenge unfair practices when others fear that it might create commotion. For example, Howard Fuller, who went on to lead Operation Breakthrough, was mentored by Austin. Austin taught Fuller to take on the upper class in the black community with the same zeal and uncompromising spirit that he used in confronting the white power structure. In the final days of his life, Austin said to Fuller, "they're going to get mad at you, but you've got to keep…doing…these things."

During Louis Austin's 44 years as editor of The Carolina Times, he shaped it into an institution that gave black people a place to voice their concerns and a conduit to be heard, and his grandson, Kenneth Edmonds, continues to carry out Austin's vision in Durham to this day. In modern-day Durham, The Carolina Times motto, "The Truth Unbridled" continues to live on, and The Carolina Times is still Durham's only black-owned and operated newspaper. Edmonds said The Carolina Times aims to help the black community progress. As the current publisher of The Carolina Times, Edmonds continues the fight for "equality, civil rights, and the political rights of African Americans." Equally important, by rallying African Americans to register to vote, Austin created a black political movement in Durham that continues to grow.

== Posthumous Recognition ==
Austin was recognized as a Main Honoree by the Sesquicentennial Honors Commission at the Durham 150 Closing Ceremony in Durham, NC on November 2, 2019. The posthumous recognition was bestowed upon 29 individuals "whose dedication, accomplishments and passion have helped shape Durham in important ways."
