= Betty Ann Kane =

American politician

Member of the Council of the District of Columbia from the at-large district
- In office January 2, 1979 – January 2, 1991
- Preceded by: Douglas E. Moore
- Succeeded by: Linda W. Cropp

Personal details
- Born: August 4, 1941 (age 85) Teaneck, New Jersey, U.S.
- Party: Democratic
- Education: Middlebury College (BA); Yale University (MA)

Betty Ann Kane (born August 4, 1941 in Teaneck, New Jersey) is an American former politician who served as an at-large member of the Council of the District of Columbia from 1979 to 1991. Kane later served as a commissioner on the District of Columbia Public Service Commission.

Kane was a non-resident elected city commissioner for Rehoboth Beach, Delaware, from 1996 to 2005.

== Political career ==
Kane was elected to the D.C. school board in 1974. In 1978, at-large city council member Douglas E. Moore decided to run for council chairman rather than for reelection, and Kane took the opportunity to run for the seat he was vacating. She narrowly defeated H. R. Crawford in the Democratic primary and went on to win the general election. Kane was re-elected in 1982 and 1986.

In 1990, Kane ran for delegate to Congress, but lost in the primary to Eleanor Holmes Norton.
