= Walter Fauntroy =

American politician (born 1933)

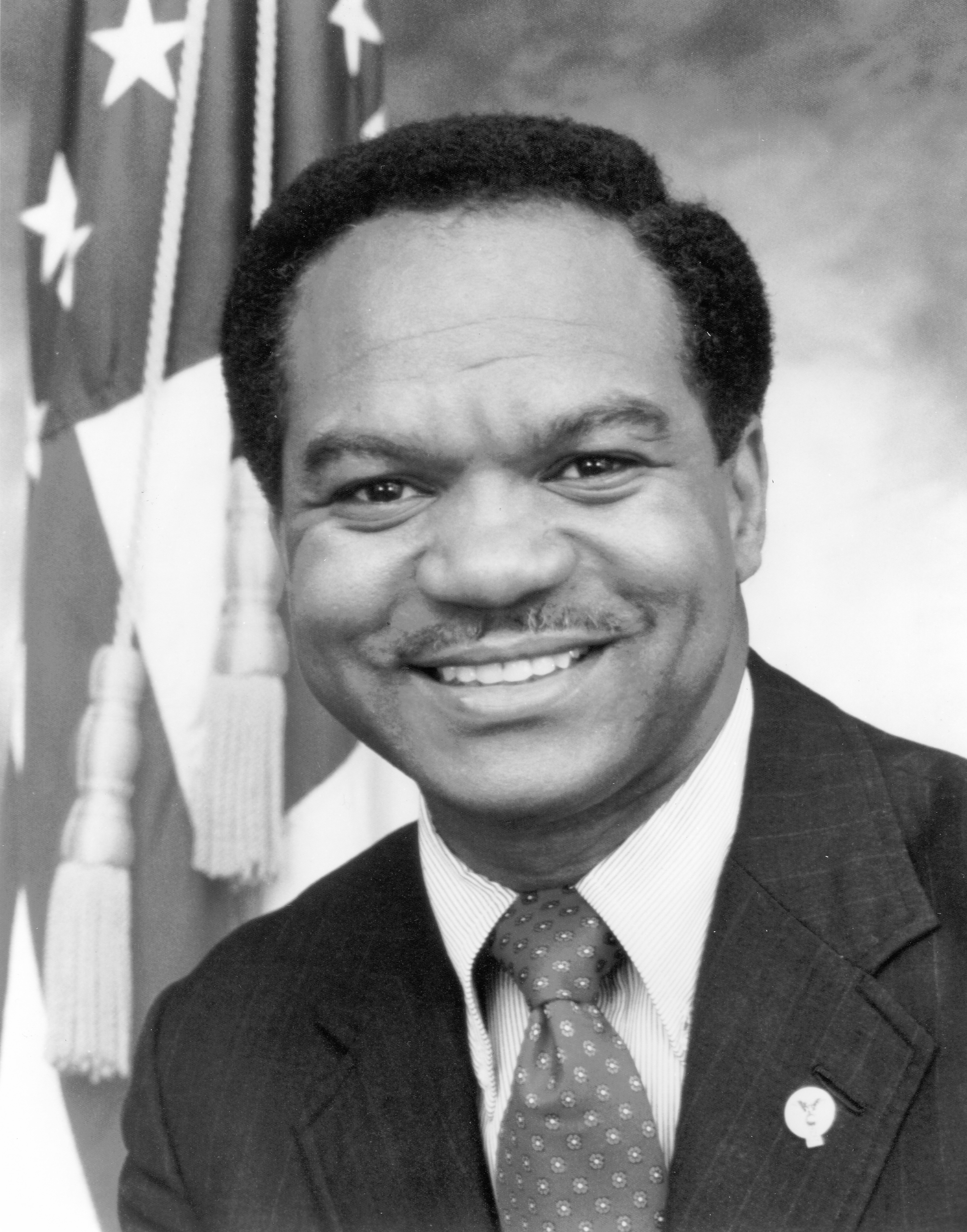

Delegate to the U.S. House of Representatives from the District of Columbia's at-large district
- In office March 23, 1971 – January 3, 1991
- Preceded by: District re-established
- Succeeded by: Eleanor Holmes Norton

Vice Chair of the District of Columbia City Council
- In office November 3, 1967 – March 13, 1969
- Appointed by: Lyndon B. Johnson
- Preceded by: Position established
- Succeeded by: Sterling Tucker

Personal details
- Born: Walter Edward Fauntroy Jr. February 6, 1933 (age 93) Washington, D.C., U.S.
- Party: Democratic
- Spouse: Dorothy Simms (m. 1957)
- Children: 2
- Education: Virginia Union University (BA); Yale University (BDiv)

Walter Edward Fauntroy Jr. (born February 6, 1933) is an American pastor, civil rights activist, and politician who was the Washington, D.C. delegate to the United States House of Representatives from 1971 to 1991. He was a candidate for the 1972 and 1976 Democratic presidential nominations as a favorite son. As of October 2026, he is the last remaining survivor of the 13 co-founders of the Congressional Black Caucus.

== Biography ==
=== Early life and education ===
The fourth of seven children, Walter Fauntroy was born and raised in Washington, D.C.. His mother, Ethel (Vines) Fauntroy, was a homemaker. His father, William Thomas Fauntroy Sr., was a clerk in the U.S. Patent Office. Walter grew up in the Shaw community in Northwest Washington, and attended the New Bethel Baptist Church just a few blocks from his home.

He graduated second in his class at Washington's all-black Dunbar High School in 1951, and the members of his church held fund-raising dinners to provide him with a college scholarship. When he graduated from Dunbar in 1952, his church gave him enough money to pay for his first year at Virginia Union University in Richmond. He pledged Kappa Alpha Psi fraternity while at Virginia Union, where he graduated with honors in 1955, and then earned a B.Div. from Yale Divinity School in 1958.

=== Civil rights leader ===
During his stay at Virginia Union University, Fauntroy met the 22-year-old Martin Luther King Jr., himself an ordained Baptist minister. With much in common, the two men formed a friendship that began with an all-night discussion of theology. Fauntroy joined the Southern Christian Leadership Conference (SCLC), and upon his return to Washington, D.C., became an influential lobbyist for civil rights in Congress. Fauntroy also helped to coordinate the 1963 March on Washington at which King gave his famous "I Have a Dream" speech. Fauntroy and King watched President John F. Kennedy's 1963 address on civil rights. After the speech, King jumped up and declared, "Walter, can you believe that white man not only stepped up to the plate, he hit it over the fence!"

After completing his education, Fauntroy became pastor of the New Bethel Baptist Church. He returned home with an unorthodox view of Christian service that his parishioners immediately embraced. Believing that religion was something more than a Sunday morning ritual, Fauntroy took part in civil rights demonstrations, sit-ins, and marches – both in Washington, D.C., and elsewhere.

As director of the Washington Bureau of the Southern Christian Leadership Conference, Fauntroy served as D.C. Coordinator of the historic March on Washington for Jobs and Freedom in 1963, and a coordinator for the 1965 Selma to Montgomery marches and the 1966 March Against Fear. President Lyndon Johnson appointed him Vice Chairman of the White House Conference on Civil Rights in 1966 and Vice Chairman of the D.C. City Council in 1967.

Fauntroy also founded and led the Model Inner City Community Organization (MICCO). This organization, which Fauntroy headed until 1971, used federal grants to improve inner city neighborhoods using black architects, city planners, and construction engineers to design and build homes, schools, stores, and other projects in urban Washington. At one time the budget for MICCO was well over $30 million, a community planning and neighborhood development group in Washington, D.C., that established and began to implement the Shaw Urban Renewal Project.

Fauntroy played a key role after the assassination of Martin Luther King Jr., meeting both with President Johnson and with activist Stokely Carmichael during the immediate aftermath. He led Sen. Robert F. Kennedy, then a presidential candidate, through the streets of Washington, D.C. after the Palm Sunday service at his church. Fauntroy urged people, in person, on TV, and over radio, to adhere to King's policy of nonviolence. He also led a prayer at King's funeral.

Because his religious beliefs placed a premium on community service, Fauntroy gravitated toward the political arena. In 1967, he was named vice-chairperson of the Washington City Council, a nine-member body appointed directly by the president of the United States. Fauntroy sat on the city council for two years, resigning when his commitments as director of MICCO began to take all of his time.

Belying his previous ecumenicism, Fauntroy asked the United States Supreme Court to stop same-sex marriage from taking place in the District of Columbia in March 2010, pending a "vote by the people".

=== Congressional career ===
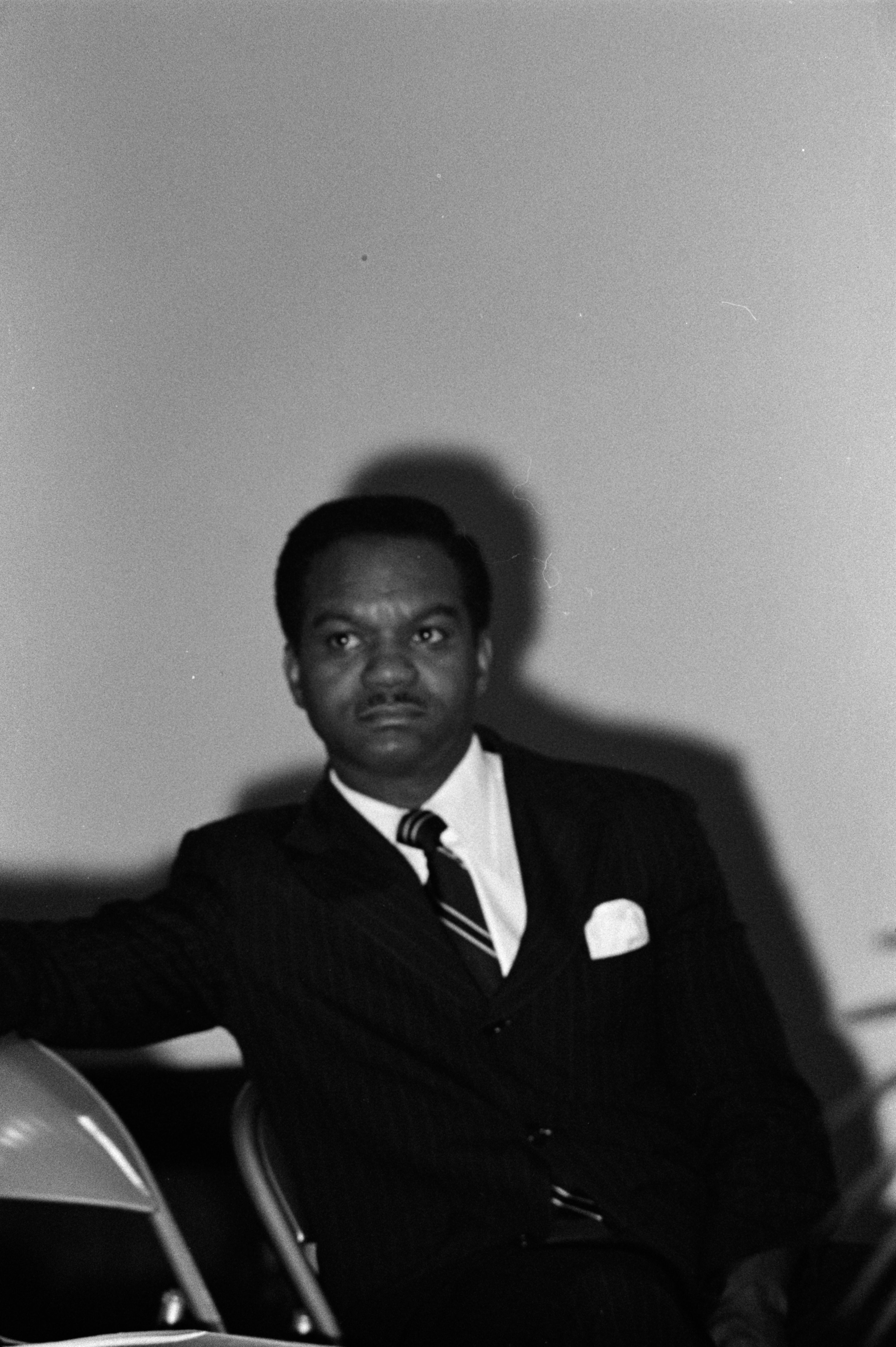
Fauntroy at a Southern Christian Leadership Conference convention in Philadelphia, Pennsylvania, August 14, 1974

The District of Columbia had no formal representation in Congress before 1970. That year, President Nixon signed the District of Columbia Delegate Act that gave the District one non-voting delegate to Congress. Fauntroy wanted the job. With the support of his fellow pastors in the city – and with appearances by his friend Coretta Scott King — he defeated two primary opponents who had both spent twice as much money as he did. Having won the primary by a substantial margin, Fauntroy easily beat Republican John A. Nevius and other candidates, including future D.C. council members Julius Hobson of the D.C. Statehood Party and Douglas E. Moore, who ran as an independent. Fauntroy was sworn in on March 23, 1971, becoming the first delegate to represent the citizens of the District of Columbia as a member of the United States House of Representatives in almost 100 years.

Although Fauntroy's status in the Congress did not allow him to vote on the House floor, he was allowed a vote in committee and could introduce legislation on any issue. Fauntroy therefore became influential with the Congressional Black Caucus (CBC) as a liberal with an agenda that included the concerns of inner city residents, the poor, and minorities. Fauntroy's special quest was for home rule – and eventually statehood – for the District of Columbia. Using his considerable political clout, he oversaw legislation that provided for direct election of a mayor and a city council in Washington by 1973. Fauntroy briefly considered running for mayor of Washington himself but instead decided to stay in Congress. He was returned to his office five times over the ensuing years, sometimes with as much as 85 percent of the vote.

Fauntroy sat on the House Select Committee on Assassinations, chairing the Martin Luther King assassination subcommittee.

In Congress, he was a founding member of the Congressional Black Caucus. He chaired the Caucus in 1981 and led the organization in presenting, for the first time, a budget to be debated by the House. The "Constructive Alternative Budget" was debated on the House floor for two days. He was a member of the House Banking, Finance and Urban Affairs Committee, Congressman Fauntroy chaired for six years the Subcommittee on Domestic Monetary Policy and for four years chaired the Subcommittee on International Development, Finance, Trade and Monetary Policy. He also chaired, for fifteen years, the Bipartisan/Bicameral Task Force on Haiti.

Fauntroy authored the Black Leadership Family Plan For the Unity, Survival and Progress of Black People in 1982. The booklet laid out a strategy for Black social, political, and economic development. On Thanksgiving Eve in 1984, Fauntroy along with Randall Robinson and Mary Francis Berry launched the Free South Africa Movement which included their arrest for a sit-in at the South African Embassy in Washington, D.C.

=== Presidential campaigns as favorite son ===
During the 1972 Democratic presidential primaries, Fauntroy campaigned in the D.C. primary as a favorite son candidate and won the largely uncontested event with 21,217 (71.78%) votes against 8,343 (28.22%) for unpledged delegates.

In the 1976 Democratic presidential primaries, he again participated in the D.C. primary, this time losing to eventual nominee Jimmy Carter; he placed second overall according to some measurements, but received zero delegates at the Democratic National Convention.

=== Post-congressional career ===
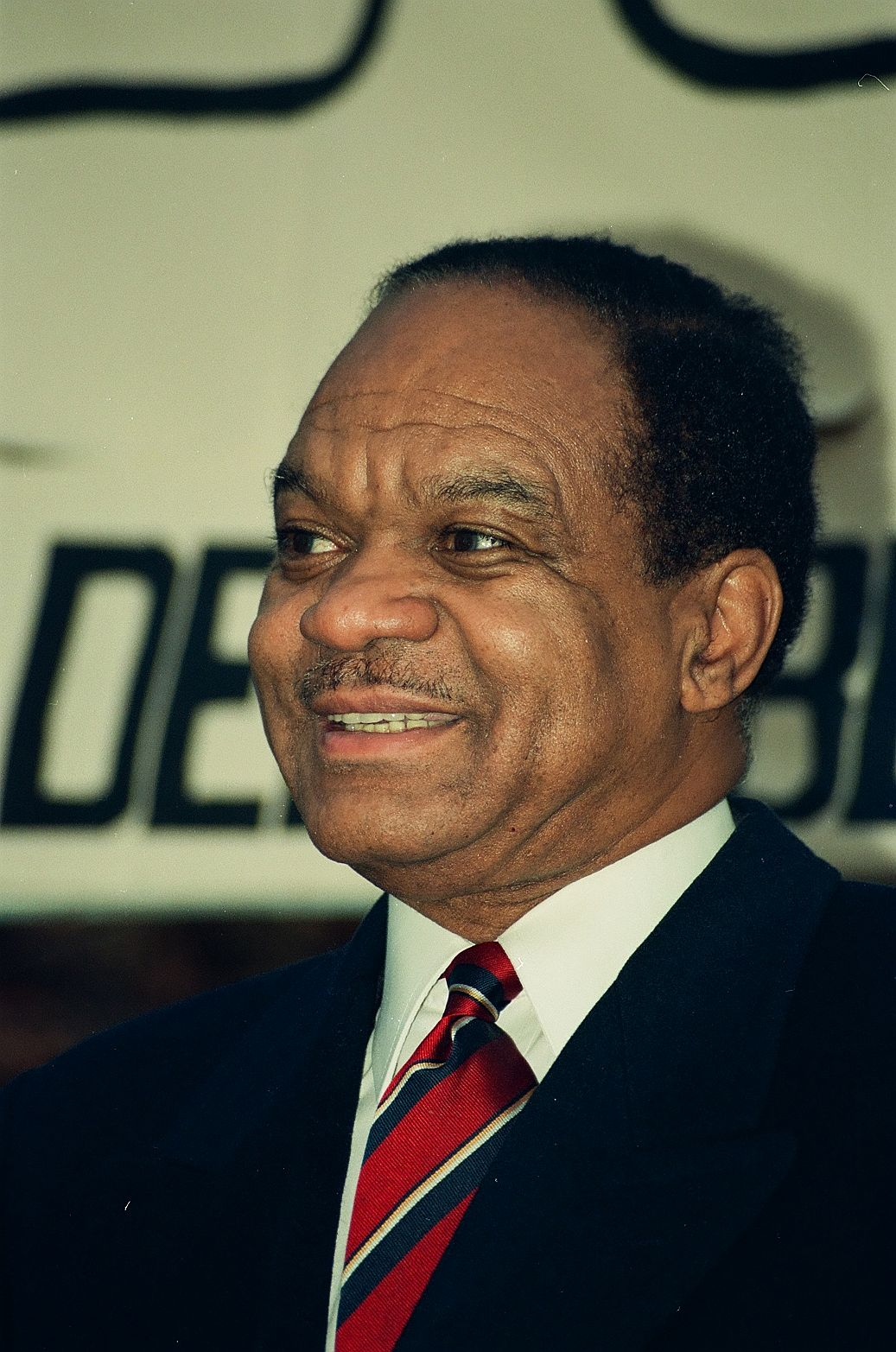
Fauntroy in 1996

Fauntroy stepped down from his seat in Congress in 1990 to run for mayor of Washington, D.C. He was defeated by Sharon Pratt Kelly, finishing fifth with 7%. He told the Washington Post: "I put together a very careful and thorough plan, but unfortunately that never got over. But I believe that all things work together for the good of those who love the Lord." Indeed, Fauntroy returned to the New Bethel Baptist Church, where he resumed a full-time ministry and rededicated himself to community service.

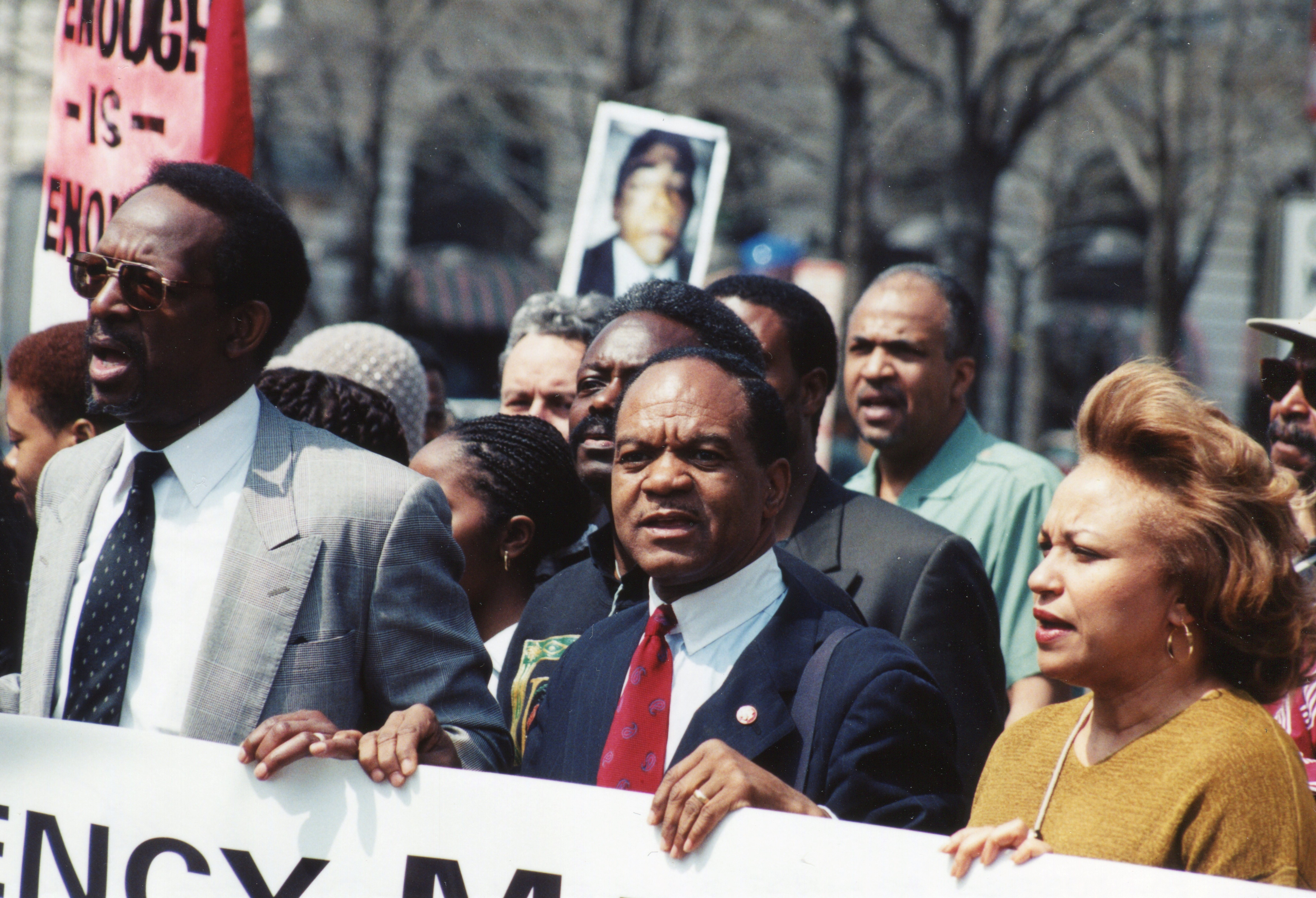
Fauntroy (center) at the National Emergency March for Justice Against Police Brutality in Washington, D.C., April 3, 1999

Fauntroy also founded Walter E. Fauntroy & Associates, a consulting firm that provides lobbying services for a variety of clients. The first and biggest client to sign on with Fauntroy was Nelson Mandela's African National Congress (ANC). Since 1992, Fauntroy has been lobbying Congress to pass legislation to create an "enterprise fund" for South Africa. He has been actively encouraging new private U.S. investment in South Africa as well. "I'm having a great time," Fauntroy told the Washington Post from his new offices on Connecticut Avenue. "The chances are very slim that I would run for local office in the District."

He is president of the National Black Leadership Roundtable (NBLR), the national network vehicle of the Congressional Black Caucus that he founded in 1977. In that capacity, as a part of the NBLR's Seven Point Program, he is co-chair of the Sudan Campaign, chairman of the Business Enterprise Development, LLC and currently heads up a U.S.-based private sector effort to cure extreme poverty in Africa by the year 2025 in pursuit of the United Nations Millennium Development Goals. The drive is undertaken by the Roundtable in partnership with the Zimbabwe Progress Fund (ZPF) and is known as the Millennium Villages Project. Its focus is upon villages in sub-Saharan Africa.

In 2005, along with fellow former African-American Democratic congressman, the Reverend Floyd Flake, he joined with U.S. Representative Walter Jones (R-NC) to support the Houses of Worship Freedom of Speech Restoration Act (H.R. 235), which would have allowed tax-exempt religious institutions to engage more directly in current politics.

Robust and athletic through most of his life, Fauntroy was diagnosed with tuberculosis in 1993, treated, and cured. He took his condition public to demystify the illness and to assure those who might be afflicted by it that they could be cured. He and his wife, Dorothy, also adopted an abandoned baby whom they named Melissa Alice.

=== Financial and legal problems ===
In 1995, Fauntroy pleaded guilty to a felony charge of filing a false disclosure statement in 1989. He had falsely reported making a $23,887 donation to a Washington church at the end of 1988.

In 2012, Fauntroy disappeared and presumably fled the United States after a bench warrant was issued for his arrest in conjunction with allegations he had written a fraudulent check for $55,000. Fauntroy's wife was eventually forced to file for bankruptcy. While his whereabouts were initially unknown to even his family, it was assumed Fauntroy was living somewhere in the Persian Gulf. In 2016, Fauntroy returned to the United States and was arrested at Washington Dulles International Airport. He had been hiding in Ajman, the capital of the Emirate of Ajman in the United Arab Emirates.

According to an April 25, 2015 Washington Post story, Fauntroy had been out of the country since 2012, and his exact whereabouts were unknown, even to his wife and family. He occasionally phoned from a Dubai number to briefly check on people. But he gave no information on his location or exact details on his current life. On June 23, 2016, the Post reported that U.S. officials had contacted Fauntroy in Ajman, United Arab Emirates and provided assistance in arranging his return to the United States, which was expected to occur in late June or early July 2016. He returned on June 27, 2016, and was arrested at Dulles International Airport on charges related to check fraud. He was released the next day. In September 2016, the bad check charge was dropped once Fauntroy paid back $20,000.

In 2018, his financial problems placed him in danger of losing his home.

== Views ==
=== Opposition to gay marriage ===
Despite his prominent role in the civil rights movement, Fauntroy had publicly opposed gay rights for some time. In 1983, he acted to bar LGBT inclusion in the program of Washington's 20th anniversary observance of Martin Luther King Jr.'s 1963 March on Washington, although the chief organizer of that march, longtime civil rights activist Bayard Rustin, was an openly gay man.

Fauntroy has been criticized by supporters of gay rights for his support in 2001 of the Federal Marriage Amendment.

In January 2007, Fauntroy was asked to speak at a Martin Luther King Jr. Day celebration in Eugene, Oregon. The city's human rights commission, knowing Fauntroy was against gay marriage, decided to withdraw from the event, which caused a firestorm of criticism. Ultimately, the commission rejoined the event.

In 2009, Fauntroy, along with six other pastors from Maryland and Washington, D.C., filed suit in D.C. Superior Court attempting to force a referendum to keep the District from recognizing out-of-state same-sex marriages. The D.C. Board of Elections and Ethics had blocked the referendum because it is illegal to put on the ballot a referendum on any issue covered by the Human Rights Act.

=== Opposition to the Tea Party Movement ===
Fauntroy viewed the grassroots conservative Tea Party movement as a racist political group. In an August 26, 2010 article by ABC, Fauntroy said, "We are going to take on the barbarism of war, the decadence of racism, and the scourge of poverty, that the Ku Klux – I meant to say the Tea Party," Fauntroy told a news conference today at the National Press Club. "You all forgive me, but I – you have to use them interchangeably."

=== 2011 Libyan civil war ===
Fauntroy visited Libya on a "peace mission" during the 2011 Libyan civil war. He remained there through the invasion of Tripoli, amongst the journalists holed up at the Rixos Al Nasr, where all Western media was based; this fact was confirmed by CNN reporter Matthew Chance on August 23, 2011, who noted on Twitter that Fauntroy was among the journalists being held within the hotel. He was released with the rest of the foreign nationals on August 25, 2011, and returned to Washington, where he took part in remembrances of the anniversary of Martin Luther King Jr.'s "I Have a Dream" speech.

In an interview with The Afro in early September 2011, Fauntroy claimed to have witnessed Danish and French special forces soldiers on the ground in Libya, beheading and maiming civilians and rebels alike and placing responsibility for the violence on the Libyans. He also said he believed "more than 90 percent of the Libyan people love [Muammar] Gaddafi", the Libyan strongman opposed by the rebel movement. He defended Gaddafi and condemned his opponents, including NATO, saying, "We believe the true mission of the attacks on Gaddafi is to prevent all efforts by African leaders to stop the recolonization of Africa." The Afro noted that it was unable to confirm any aspects of Fauntroy's story, and there has been no independent corroboration of his claims.

== Personal life ==
Fauntroy was married to the former Dorothy Simms of Petersburg, Virginia. She died in June 2023. Together they have two children: Marvin Keith and Melissa Alice.

== Awards and honors ==
In recognition of Fauntroy's humanitarian service, both his alma maters, Virginia Union University and Yale University, have conferred honorary Doctor of Law Degrees on him. He also holds honorary degrees from Howard University and Georgetown University Law Center.

The National Urban Coalition honored Fauntroy with its Hubert H. Humphrey Humanitarian Award in 1984.

== See also ==
- List of African-American United States representatives
- List of American federal politicians convicted of crimes
- List of federal political scandals in the United States

Council of the District of Columbia
New office	Vice Chair of the District of Columbia City Council; 1967–1969	Succeeded by Sterling Tucker
U.S. House of Representatives
Constituency reestablished	Delegate to the U.S. House of Representatives from the District of Columbia's at-large congressional district 1971–1991	Succeeded by Eleanor Holmes Norton
Preceded by Cardiss Collins	Chair of the Congressional Black Caucus; 1981–1983	Succeeded by Julian Dixon
