= Mitchell Lazar =

- Born: 1956 (age 69–70)
- Education: Massachusetts Institute of Technology; Stanford University
- Known for: discovery of resistin
- Scientific career
- Workplaces: University of Pennsylvania

Mitchell Lazar (born 1956) is an endocrinologist and physician-scientist known for his discovery of the hormone resistin and his contributions to the transcriptional regulation of metabolism.

Lazar is the Willard and Rhoda Ware Professor in Diabetes and Metabolic Diseases, and the director of the Institute for Diabetes, Obesity and Metabolism at the University of Pennsylvania.

Lazar graduated from Syosset High School, and three years later received his undergraduate degree in chemistry from the Massachusetts Institute of Technology, then received a PhD in Neurosciences and an MD from Stanford University. He trained in Internal Medicine at Brigham and Women's Hospital in Boston and in Endocrinology at the Massachusetts General Hospital before joining the University of Pennsylvania faculty in 1989.

Lazar's research focus is on the epigenomic regulation of gene expression and metabolism. He is particularly interested in nuclear receptors, which are master regulators of metabolism. Lazar's findings relate to the basic mechanisms of nuclear receptor action and their role in obesity and diabetes, most notably the discovery of the hormone resistin.

Lazar is a former member of the Board of Scientific Councilors of the National Institutes of Diabetes, Digestive, and Kidney Diseases. He has served as associate editor of Diabetes, and is on the editorial boards of Genes & Development, Cell Metabolism, Trends in Endocrinology and Metabolism, Endocrine Reviews, JCI, and Science.

Lazar has been elected to the American Society for Clinical Investigation and the Association of American Physicians. He has received two NIH MERIT Awards, the Van Meter Award of the American Thyroid Association, the BMS Freedom to Discover Award, the Richard Weitzman Award and the Edwin B. Astwood Award Lecture from the Endocrine Society, and the Stanley J. Korsmeyer Award of the American Society for Clinical Investigation. He was elected to the National Academy of Medicine in 2006, and to the American Academy of Arts and Sciences in 2008. He is the recipient of the 2014 Transatlantic Medal of the Society for Endocrinology. In 2017 Dr. Lazar was elected to the National Academy of Sciences.
