= H. R. Crawford =

American politician (1939–2017)

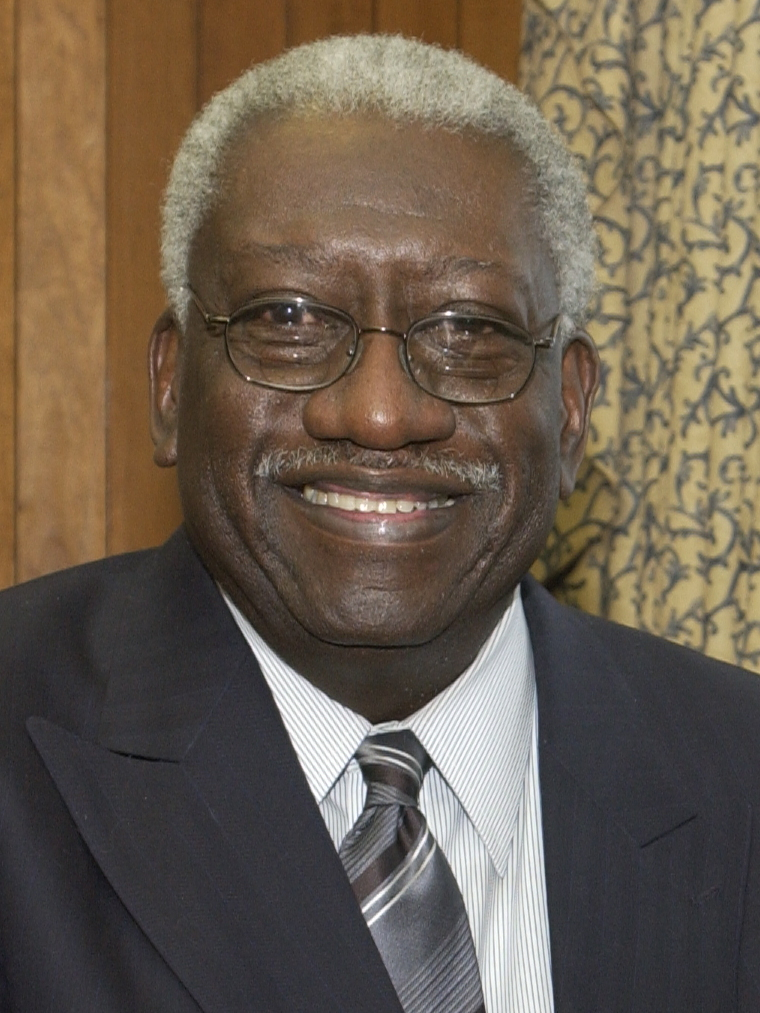

Assistant Secretary of Housing and Urban Development for Housing Management
- In office April 2, 1973 – January 27, 1976
- President: Jimmy Carter
- Preceded by: Norman Watson
- Succeeded by: James Young

Member of the Council of the District of Columbia from Ward 7
- In office January 2, 1981 – January 1, 1994
- Preceded by: Willie Hardy
- Succeeded by: Kevin P. Chavous

Personal details
- Born: Hazle Reid Crawford; January 18, 1939 Winston-Salem, North Carolina, U.S.
- Died: February 10, 2017 (aged 78) Washington, D.C., U.S.
- Party: Democratic
- Spouse: Eleanora Frankel
- Education: University of the District of Columbia (attended); Howard University (attended); Chicago State University (BA)

Hazle Reid Crawford (January 18, 1939 – February 10, 2017) was an American real estate developer and Democratic politician in Washington, D.C..

== Early life ==
Crawford was born in Winston-Salem, North Carolina, on January 18, 1939. His family moved to Sheridan-Kalorama, Washington, D.C., when he was three years old. After five years, the family moved to Near Northeast, Washington, D.C. His father worked for the federal government and also ran the rooming house in which he grew up, and his mother worked as a housekeeper for a wealthy white family. He has said that being exposed to his mother's employer's richer and more cultured lifestyle motivated him to succeed.

Crawford graduated from Cardozo High School in 1957. He served in the United States Air Force from 1957 to 1965. He attended District of Columbia Teachers College and Howard University before receiving his bachelor's from Chicago State University.

== Real estate profession ==
In 1962, Crawford started working as the property manager of Anacostia Gardens Apartments in Fort Dupont. By 1965, he was managing the Congress Park Apartments in Congress Heights. He carried a gun to protect himself in Congress Heights. He quit the job when a perpetrator raped a 22-year-old woman on the property.

Polinger Company hired Crawford to manage the newly built Park Southern apartment complex in Washington Highlands.

In 1968, Crawford joined the board of directors of a construction and management firm, Polinger Company. In 1969, he was named vice president of the newly formed Polinger-Crawford Corporation.

Crawford was awarded a Certified Property Manager designation by the Institute of Real Estate Management in 1969, becoming one of seven Certified Property Managers who is black. By 1970, he was a consultant for Urban Rehabilitation Corporation, chairman of Anacostia Citizens and Merchants, Inc., chairman of the Sixth District Police–Citizens Advisory Council, treasurer of Congress Heights Association for Service and Education, member of the Mayor's Juvenile Delinquency Committee, and a member of the board of trustees of the Junior Citizens Corporation.

The Washington chapter of the Institute of Real Estate Management formed a Mayor's Advisory Committee, and it named Crawford a member of the committee. When the Council of the District of Columbia proposed regulations intended to address the severe housing crisis, Crawford was part of a task force to study the potential effect of the proposed regulations.

Crawford received a Presidential commendation "in recognition of exceptional service to others" in 1970.

In 1971, Crawford was involved in building a 400-unit residential complex in Shaw. During the same year, he formed H.R. Crawford, Inc., which would manage a newly built 1,200-unit residential complex in Edgewood. Crawford served as president and board chairman of the company.

Crawford described his property management style as a "law and order attitude". Some tenants of the properties he managed were critical of his management style and said that the properties were not well maintained.

== Community activism ==
Crawford served as chairman of the Congress Heights Neighborhood Planning Council. He conceived of and led a summer enrichment program to bring children from Southeast D.C. to meet prosperous Black families in Glenarden, Maryland.

When residents of Congress Heights opposed the building of a 730-unit apartment complex, Crawford advocated in favor of the complex, saying that few developers want to invest in the neighborhood and that residents should appreciate a developer who decides to do so.

== Early political ambitions ==
In 1971, Crawford sought to be appointed to the City Council. President Richard Nixon decided to appoint Joseph P. Yedell and Margaret A. Haywood to the City Council instead. Crawford again sought the appointment in 1972 after Yedell decided to resign from his post in order to become the District's human resources director. President Nixon appointed Tedson J. Meyers to the City Council instead.

== Department of Housing and Urban Development ==
=== Nomination and confirmation hearings ===
On March 7, 1973, Crawford was nominated by President Richard Nixon to be Assistant Secretary for Housing Management at the Department of Housing and Urban Development.

Delegate Walter E. Fauntroy and D.C. School Board President Marion Barry both praised Crawford's appointment. The National Tenants Organization opposed Crawford's appointment, saying that Crawford "lacks the skill to deal with complex problems, whose oversimplifications and crude responses deny the possibility of mutual cooperation, and whose understanding of the problems is limited."

During Crawford's confirmation hearings before the United States Senate Committee on Banking, Housing, and Urban Affairs, he said that public housing is "too paternalistic and too permissive". He said he wanted to give public housing residents the motivation to improve themselves so they can move out of public housing. The Senate Committee recommended Crawford be confirmed, and the Senate voted to confirm Crawford on March 14, 1973. Crawford was the highest ranking black staff member in the Nixon administration. In the position, Crawford was in charge of all public-housing units and federally assisted housing in the nation.

=== Live-ins ===
On Crawford's first full day in the position, April 2, 1973, he told twenty of his division managers that they would spend an entire weekend at a public housing development in Washington, D.C. They would sleep in vacant apartments in the buildings. Crawford said he wanted each of them "to have first-hand knowledge of how to cope and exist with inner city properties." With help from the National Capital Housing Authority, Crawford planned to have the staff members stay in vacant apartments in the Frederick Douglas Dwelling development at 21st Street and Alabama Avenue SE. After a delay caused by emergencies related to flooding in parts of the country, the one-day one-night trip to the Frederick Douglas Dwelling took place at the end of May 1973. During the trip, the staff members met with Thelma N. Jones, chair of a tenant advocate group in the neighborhood. Jones stressed that a minority of public housing tenants has scared the majority of tenants through vandalism and other crimes, leaving them with no option but to move to another public housing unit. Jones called on the officials to get tougher on the tenants who commit crimes in the public housing developments. The next year, Crawford instructed another 51 staff members to take similar overnight trips.

=== Tenure ===
Crawford reinstated a subsidy program through the Federal Housing Administration that could make federally owned vacant homes available to people with low incomes. He also had some of the federally owned vacant homes sold to local governments in order to be converted into public housing.

Crawford instituted a training program in property management intended to train housing project managers. Topics included reading a lease, tenant relations, janitorial services, maintenance services, and operating an on-site office. The Institute of Real Estate Management designed the training program.

When Columbia Heights public housing development Clifton Terrace had issued with vandalism and unpaid rent, the Department of Housing and Urban Development accepted bids for a new property management company. Crawford instructed the department to contract with Pride, Inc., which had the highest bid out of all seven bids. Pride, Inc., was led by Marion Barry's ex-wife Mary Treadwell Barry.

In 1974, Crawford allocated $100 million for repairs and security improvements to public housing developments in the United States.

In 1975, Crawford testified to a government operations subcommittee of the United States House of Representatives. The testimony was in regards to a report by the General Accounting Office that the Department of Housing and Urban Development was unable to effectively administer its public housing. Crawford did not dispute reports that his department did not collect rents, keeps apartments vacant, does not maintain properties properly, and manages the properties inefficiently. Crawford attributed these deficiencies on the United States federal civil service, courts delaying evictions due to nonpayment of rent, and Congressional intervention in the firing of an incompetent government employee. Crawford said these problems would inevitably continue for a long time.

=== Resignation ===
Crawford intended to resign his position at the United States Department of Housing and Urban Development in April 1975. Instead, Crawford immediately resigned from the position on January 27, 1976, when President Gerald Ford asked for his resignation because of a Department of Justice investigation into a possible conflict of interest.

Crawford had been discussing possible consulting jobs for himself after he planned to leave the Department of Housing and Urban Development in April 1975. He had negotiations with three different public housing authorities that also received federal funding from Crawford's office. The department's general counsel said it is illegal for a federal employee who is considering resignation to "solicit, negotiate or arrange for private employment when you are acting on behalf of HUD in a matter in which your prospective employer has a financial interest in the form of a contract, loan or grant or otherwise." When one of these public housing authorities, the New York City Housing Authority, received a written job solicitation from Crawford, it sent it the Department of Housing and Urban Development to determine whether it was proper of Crawford to do so.

Looking back several months later, Crawford called it a mistake in judgment.

The United States Department of Justice cleared Crawford of engaging in illegal acts. The Department of Justice said it did not deal with impropriety.

== Return to property management ==
After leaving the United States Department of Housing and Urban Development, Crawford returned to property management. He was an executive for the company managing Columbia Heights Village. He was involved in the Washington Apartment in Shaw, the Kenesaw in Mount Pleasant, and Trinity Towers Apartment in Columbia Heights.

In 1978, Crawford bought several dozen houses and apartments in Shaw in order to renovate them with loans from the District of Columbia. His intention was to either rent them or sell them to people of modest means.

== Council of the District of Columbia ==
On April 19, 1978, Crawford announced he would run for at-large member of the Council of the District of Columbia as a Democrat.

A group of elderly residents of the Edgewood Terrace Apartments were taken to Crawford's announcement ceremony in a bus owned by the District of Columbia Department of Recreation. When asked about campaign use of a government-owned vehicle, Crawford said he knew nothing about it.

Crawford campaigned on reducing the cost of government, reducing crime, improving education, and reducing taxes. His candidacy was endorsed by the Metropolitan Washington Board of Trade's political action committee.

When Crawford was late arriving to a candidates' forum, he blamed it on his car running over a black cat. He said, "I'm more upset tonight than I was a long time ago when an elderly white gentleman ran into the back of my car and was killed." Asked about his comments later, Crawford later insisted his comments "were certainly not intended to be bigotry" and instead related to the superstition about black cats. He said he does "preach black pride, black independence".

Opposing candidate Betty Ann Kane said that, if Crawford were elected, he would have many conflicts of interest because of his interests in government-financed housing developments and campaign donations from real estate developers. Crawford said he had never had a conflict of interest and that he would never have had a conflict of interest if elected.

Crawford lost the Democratic Party primary election to Betty Ann Kane.

Crawford was elected as Ward 7 member of the Council of the District of Columbia in 1980 and served three terms.

== Later years ==
Crawford was president of the real estate firm Crawford Edgewood Managers and chaired the board of directors of the Metropolitan Washington Airports Authority.

Crawford was diagnosed with prostate cancer around 1997.

Crawford died on February 10, 2017, at the age of 78. He received a Catholic funeral at St Francis Xavier Church in DC.

== Personal life ==
Crawford was Catholic, active in the Black Catholic scene of DC and a member of the Knights of Columbus.

== Electoral history ==
=== 1978 ===
Council of the District of Columbia, at-large, Democratic primary election, 1978
Party	Candidate	Votes	%
Democratic	Betty Ann Kane	27,103	34
Democratic	H. R. Crawford	23,223	29
Democratic	Goldie C. Johnson	11,291	14
Democratic	Marie S. Nahikian	7,926	10
Democratic	Hector Rodriguez	2,581	4
Democratic	Absalom F. Jordan	2,540	3
Democratic	Robert V. Brown	1,952	2
Democratic	Lee S. Manor	1,292	2
Democratic	JePhunneh Lawrence	1,038	1

=== 1980 ===
Council of the District of Columbia, Ward 7, Democratic primary election, 1980
Party	Candidate	Votes	%
Democratic	H. R. Crawford	3,514	45
Democratic	Johnny Barnes	3,350	43
Democratic	Emily Y. Washington	998	13

Council of the District of Columbia, Ward 7, general election, 1980
Party	Candidate	Votes	%
Democratic	H. R. Crawford	14,518	85
Republican	John West	1,006	6
Independent	Maryland D. Kemp	910	5
Independent	Durand A. Ford	628	4

=== 1984 ===
Council of the District of Columbia, Ward 7, Democratic primary election, 1984
Party	Candidate	Votes	%
Democratic	H. R. Crawford	4,711	68
Democratic	Johnnie Mae Scott Rice	1,184	17
Democratic	Harold Bell	1,057	15

Council of the District of Columbia, Ward 7, general election, 1984
Party	Candidate	Votes	%
Democratic	H. R. Crawford	16,470	100

=== 1988 ===
Council of the District of Columbia, Ward 7, Democratic primary election, 1988
Party	Candidate	Votes	%
Democratic	H. R. Crawford	3,033	44
Democratic	Nate Bush	2,780	41
Democratic	Johnnie Scott Rice	470	7
Democratic	Kevin Williams	407	6
Democratic	Lankward L. Smith Jr.	45	1
Democratic	Write-in	14	1

Council of the District of Columbia, Ward 7, general election, 1988
Party	Candidate	Votes	%
Democratic	H. R. Crawford	13,747	74
Independent	Glenn L. French	3,029	16
DC Statehood	Rick Tingling-Clemmons	836	5
Republican	Paul F. Williams	803	4

=== 1992 ===
Council of the District of Columbia, Ward 7, Democratic primary election, 1992
Party	Candidate	Votes	%
Democratic	Kevin P. Chavous	4,816	42
Democratic	H. R. Crawford	4,266	37
Democratic	Nate Bush	2,140	18
Democratic	A. (Tony) Graham Sr.	304	3
Democratic	Write-in	17	0
