= Greater Bethlehem Temple Apostolic Faith Church =

Church in Durham, North Carolina, US

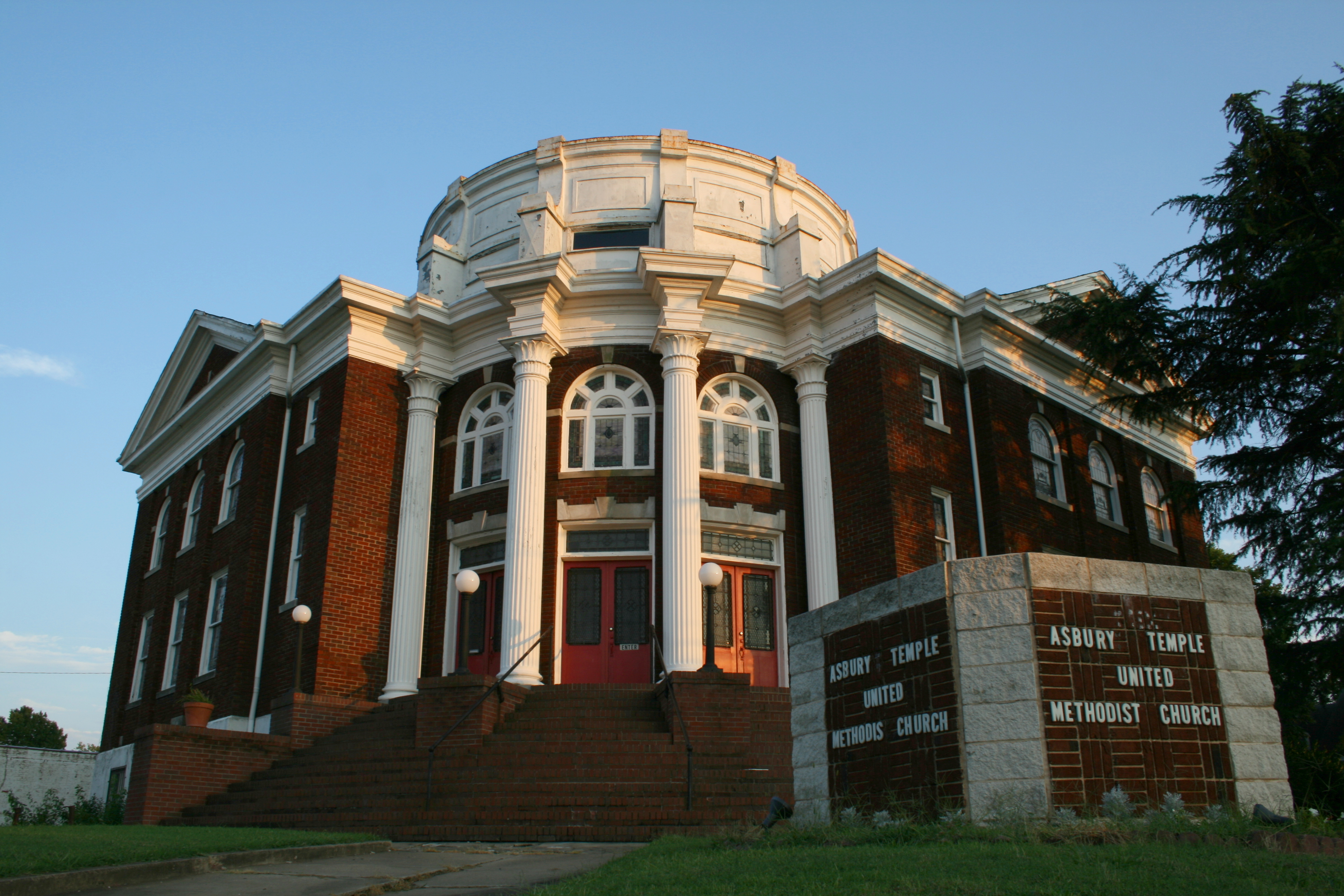
- The church (then Asbury Temple UMC) in 2008

Religion
- Affiliation: Methodist Episcopal Church (formerly); United Methodist (formerly); Apostolic Faith Church
- Leadership: Bishop Larry J. Copeland
- Status: Active

Location
- Location: 201 S Alston Avenue; Durham, North Carolina, United States
- Interactive map of Greater Bethlehem Temple Apostolic Faith Church
- Coordinates: 35°59′9″N 78°53′18″W

Architecture
- Architect: Charles W. Carlton
- Type: Neoclassical architecture
- Completed: 1925

Greater Bethlehem Temple Apostolic Faith Church, formerly known as Asbury Temple Methodist Church, is a historic church in Durham, North Carolina. The building, located in the East Durham Historic District, originally housed a Methodist congregation but now houses a Holiness Pentecostal congregation.

== History ==
The Commonwealth Methodist Episcopal Church was established in the 1880s and later changed their name to Branson Methodist Church in 1904, renaming the congregation in honor of William H. Branson, the director of the Durham Cotton Manufacturing Company and the Pearl Cotton Mills. The church later reorganized as Asbury Temple United Methodist Church. It was built by the architect Charles W. Carlton.

In 1957, the church's pastor Douglas E. Moore, organized the Royal Ice Cream sit-in to protest racial segregation in Durham. In the 1970s, Gregory V. Palmer served as pastor at the church.

The Methodist congregation later left and the a Pentecostal congregation moved in to the building.
