= Gregory V. Palmer =

American Methodist bishop

Gregory Vaughn Palmer (born August 8, 1954) is an American bishop of The United Methodist Church, elected in 2000. He was born and raised in Philadelphia, Pennsylvania. His father, Herbert Palmer, is also a United Methodist pastor.

== Education ==
He was educated in the Philadelphia public schools. In 1976 he earned the B.A. degree at George Washington University. His M.Div. degree is from the Duke Divinity School (1979). Palmer was awarded an honorary D.D. from Baldwin-Wallace College in 1999.

== Ordained ministry ==
Prior to his election to the episcopacy, Bishop Palmer served as a pastor and a district superintendent. He entered the ministry in his home Eastern Pennsylvania Annual Conference of the United Methodist Church in 1977. He served churches in North Carolina, where he was the pastor of the Granville-Vance U.M. Charge in Oxford, North Carolina and of the Asbury Temple United Methodist Church in Durham, North Carolina.

Transferring to the East Ohio Annual Conference in 1979, he served as pastor of the East Glenville United Methodist Church in Cleveland (1979–81), and of the Werner United Methodist Church in Cleveland (1981–85). He then became the Organizing Pastor of the James S. Thomas United Methodist Church in Canton, Ohio (1985–90). In 1990 Palmer was appointed superintendent of the Youngstown District of the East Ohio Conference. He served in this capacity until 1993 when he was appointed pastor of the Berea United Methodist Church in Berea, Ohio. It was from this position that he was elected a bishop by the North Central Jurisdictional Conference of the United Methodist Church.

Palmer was elected a delegate from East Ohio to United Methodist General and Jurisdictional Conferences (1988–2000), serving as the Delegation Chairperson in 1996. He served on the United Methodist General Council on Ministries. He has been a trustee of Baldwin-Wallace College, Ohio Wesleyan University, and United Theological Seminary. He has also been an adjunct instructor in religion at Baldwin-Wallace.

Bishop Palmer served as resident bishop of the Iowa Area from 2000 until 2008. He served his first quadrennium as resident bishop of the Illinois Episcopal Area (Illinois Great Rivers Annual Conference), assigned there in 2008. He is serving the Ohio West Episcopal Area (West Ohio Annual Conference), assigned there in 2012. He was the president of the United Methodist Council of Bishops from May 2008 to May 2010.

== Personal ==
Bishop Palmer is married to Cynthia Palmer. They have two children.

== See also ==
- List of bishops of the United Methodist Church
