= Douglas E. Moore =

American minister (1928–2019)

Douglas Moore

Chair pro tempore of the Council of the District of Columbia
- In office January 2, 1975 – January 3, 1977
- Preceded by: Sterling Tucker (Vice Chair of the D.C. City Council)
- Succeeded by: Willie Hardy

Member of the Council of the District of Columbia from the at-large district
- In office January 2, 1975 – January 2, 1979
- Preceded by: Position established
- Succeeded by: Betty Ann Kane

Personal details
- Born: Douglas Elaine Moore; July 23, 1928 Hickory, North Carolina, U.S.
- Died: August 22, 2019 (aged 91) Clinton, Maryland, U.S.
- Party: Democratic
- Education: North Carolina Central University (BA); Boston University (STB, STM)

Douglas Elaine Moore (July 23, 1928 – August 22, 2019) was a Methodist minister who organized the 1957 Royal Ice Cream Sit-in in Durham, North Carolina. Moore entered the ministry at a young age. After finding himself dissatisfied with what he perceived as a lack of action among his divinity peers, he decided to take a more activist course. Shortly after becoming a pastor in Durham, Moore decided to challenge the city's power structure via the Royal Ice Cream Sit-in, a protest in which he and several others sat down in the white section of an ice cream parlor and asked to be served. The sit-in failed to challenge segregation in the short run, and Moore's actions provoked a myriad of negative reactions from many white and African-American leaders, who considered his efforts far too radical. Nevertheless, Moore continued to press forward with his agenda of activism.

Ultimately, however, Moore's plan of using the sit-in to challenge Durham's power structure proved successful. A new wave of young African-American students, inspired by the actions of the Royal Ice Cream protestors, adopted Moore's agenda, helping to bring about the desegregation of the city's public facilities. His actions also had effects that stretched far beyond the boundaries of Durham. Working with activist leaders he had once spurned, including Martin Luther King Jr., and inspired by the actions of students in places such as Greensboro, North Carolina, Moore was able to organize additional sit-ins during the sit-in movement that spread all across the South. His work with the sit-in helped to spur the creation of “local movement centers”, which facilitated the collective actions of African-Americans seeking to bring about an end to segregation throughout North Carolina and the region in years to come. In addition, Moore's idea of a group that used the power of nonviolence, using Christianity as an ideological base, ultimately became the symbol of a new era of activism and civil rights in the United States.

== Early life and education ==
Douglas Elaine Moore was born in 1928 in Hickory, North Carolina. At an early age, he decided to follow in the footsteps of his grandfather and enter the Methodist ministry. Shortly after earning a Bachelor of Arts from North Carolina College in 1949, Moore enrolled at Boston University as a divinity student in 1951. His political leanings were evident early on, as he joined a radical leftist group on campus and participated in protests of social ills. Moore also temporarily joined a student group called the Dialectical Society, which met every week for dinner and a discussion. However, he found the talks largely dissatisfying, viewing them as far too passive and abstract. In addition, he was not too fond of the leader of the Dialectical Society, the then-unknown Martin Luther King Jr. Referring to him as “just another Baptist preacher”, Moore invited King to join his student group. However, King declined to do so, likely put off by its radicalness and activist agenda. Moore soon parted ways with the Dialectical Society. He earned his Bachelor of Sacred Theology in 1953 and his Master of Sacred Theology in 1958.

== Move to Durham ==
After graduating, Moore moved back to the American South. He served as the minister for two small-town Methodist churches before becoming the pastor of Durham's Asbury Temple Methodist Church in 1956. Soon after arriving in the city, Moore began to look for ways to challenge its power structure. Despite the fact that Durham was known for having better-than-average race relations for the region, Moore quickly concluded that it was the “same as any other place: They [the whites] wouldn't give up nothing”. He made several attempts to desegregate the city's public facilities. After his family was denied admission to the then all-white Long Meadow Park swimming pool in 1957, Moore appealed to Durham recreation officers, to no avail. Other efforts included petitions to the city council to end segregation at the Carolina Theatre and the Durham Public Library. While these also resulted in little to no changes, Moore would make headlines later that year via what came to be known as the Royal Ice Cream Sit-in.

== Royal Ice Cream Sit-in ==
On June 23, 1957, the 28-year-old Moore led three African-American men and three African-American women into the segregated Royal Ice Cream Parlor. They all sat down in the white section and asked to be served. Moore later told a reporter, “We just decided we wanted to cool off, to get some ice cream or milk shakes.” The truth, however, was much more far-reaching than that. Moore later said that the parlor was chosen in advance because of its location in a predominantly-African-American neighborhood. He also indicated that he intended the sit-in to serve as a barometer – a way to see how much progress African-American protestors could make, as well as what they needed to achieve more in the future. In the end, after being asked to leave by the owner of the parlor and refusing to do so, all of the protestors, including Moore, were arrested. They were all convicted of trespassing and fined $10 plus court costs. The sit-in soon turned into a protracted court battle: seeking an ally in his fight for the desegregation of public facilities, Moore hired Floyd McKissick, a prominent African-American attorney, to sue Royal Ice Cream. At the same time, he and the other protestors appealed their convictions. The case eventually made its way to the North Carolina Supreme Court, but the defendants ultimately lost.

The Royal Ice Cream Sit-in produced much controversy from the start. Moore failed to communicate to the sit-in participants all of the possible consequences of their actions: Virginia Williams and Mary Clyburn, two of the protestors, claimed in later interviews that they had not expected to be arrested. Nevertheless, the sit-in was carried out anyway, and there was immediate backlash from African-American groups in Durham. The Durham Committee on Negro Affairs and the Durham Ministerial Alliance heavily criticized Moore, calling his efforts “radical”. Indeed, Moore's call for immediate change directly opposed the practices of the African-American community in Durham. Previously, it had relied on backroom talks with the white elite to bring about concessions in a deliberate manner. Moore's actions came as a surprise to many and threatened to upset the delicate balance that existed in Durham, resulting in a backlash against the protestors from the city's African-American community. The vitriol shocked the sit-in participants, as they had only expected hostile reactions from Durham's white citizens. Mary Clyburn later recalled, “I didn’t hear nobody being happy about what we've done”.

== Durham movement ==
Despite the initial backlash to the sit-in, Moore ultimately helped to bring about much change to Durham. He soon found himself some powerful allies in the city's community, including McKissick and outspoken African-American newspaperman and Carolina Times editor Louis Austin, who just one week prior to the sit-in had run an editorial denouncing Durham's elite African-American institutions. With support from these new allies, Moore was able to drum up support for a Durham-wide movement. The Durham Committee on Negro Affairs' Economic Committee, headed by McKissick, debated whether or not to boycott Royal Ice Cream Parlor. As Moore himself later revealed, there was doubt as to whether or not this would be a good idea, due to the fact that the parlor's owner, Louis Coletta, was a Greek American and a minority himself. Nevertheless, the mere presence of such a discussion symbolized the growing activist movement in Durham, which was fueled primarily by the city's young African-Americans. Challenging the conservatism of the African-American elite, the Durham youth embraced Moore's activist agenda. For instance, a group of young girls held regular pickets outside of the parlor under the direction of McKissick, despite being members of the Durham NAACP, which had refused to publicly support Moore. The Durham movement eventually began to pick up steam, leading to a rapid series of reforms in the coming years. In 1960, the city became just the seventh one in North Carolina to desegregate its lunch counter service. After several years of legal action, the Royal Ice Cream Parlor finally desegregated along with the rest of the city's public facilities in 1963.

The pace of the Durham movement surprised even Moore himself. In 1960, four African-American students held their own sit-in at the Woolworth's Department Store in neighboring Greensboro, North Carolina. At the time, Moore and McKissick had been organizing a nationwide sit-in that would begin in Durham. Originally, they felt that the Greensboro students had acted too soon. When McKissick heard about the sit-in, he exclaimed, “Oh my God, these kids have jumped the gun!” Nevertheless, Moore and his allies soon realized that the time had come to take action, realizing that the student activists in Durham wanted to emulate their Greensboro counterparts. Exactly one week after the Greensboro sit-in, Moore and McKissick led one of their own. They led dozens of college students into the heart of Durham, where they sat down at the lunch counters of Woolworth's. When the manager closed the counter, the students moved on the counters at S.H. Kress and Walgreens, which were also shut down. However, the message had been sent, and by the end of the week, students in Charlotte, Raleigh, Winston-Salem, and Fayetteville had joined in the sit-in movement, frightening white store owners by dressing well and staying dignified. The Durham movement had finally begun to spread beyond the city limits.

== Work with King and regional civil rights activists ==
The inspiration behind the Durham movement and the ones it inspired came from an unlikely source. Back in 1955, Moore heard the news that his former classmate at Boston University, Martin Luther King Jr., was leading the Montgomery bus boycott in Montgomery, Alabama. Surprised at the change in the once-timid King, Moore decided to write him a letter. In it, he detailed his own experiences with the desegregation of buses in North Carolina and Virginia, noting that by relying “completely upon the force of love and Christian witness”, he was able to achieve his goals. Moore went on to suggest “a regional group which uses the power of nonviolence”, hinting that such a group, were it well-disciplined, could “break the backbone of segregated travel in North Carolina in less than a year”. King, however, continued to display reluctance to partake in Moore's radical agenda. In the end, Moore received only a polite thank-you note from King's secretary. However, he continued to let his faith play a role in his actions. Moore led a group of young Durham activists called “ACT”, which met at church every Sunday to talk about how to test the limits of the South's Jim Crow laws. When the student activism movement began to take flight in Durham, it was backed by the city's African-American churches, especially the female members of the congregations. Moore also became a board member of King's Southern Christian Leadership Conference. With his new-found power, he was able to find new ways to get his message of a nonviolent regional group across the South. For instance, Moore supported the efforts of McKissick to spread the gospel of direct action to African-American students in North Carolina. In addition, the organizers of the SCLC sent out a call for clergyman to organize their congregations for a widespread protest in 1957.

The growing movement in the South soon became impossible for King to ignore. A week after the Durham sit-ins, he received an invitation from Moore to come to the city, which he accepted. The two visited the lunch counters that had been open just a few days earlier and spoke at White Rock Baptist Church. King gave the sit-in movement his blessing, saying that the student activists had made the sit-in action itself “a creative protest that is destined to be one of the glowing epics of our time”. With the support of King, the movement continued to grow.

Moore enlisted the help of other regional leaders such as James M. Lawson Jr., another Methodist minister. Lawson, like Moore, taught college students at his church in Nashville how to resist violence and employ the power of love to fight against segregation. Right after the Greensboro sit-ins, Moore urged Lawson to take action and organize a sit-in at his local Woolworth's, which he did. Activists around the South were soon making similar moves, thanks to networks set up by Moore and his allies, whose work also helped to popularize what became known as “local movement centers”. These centers can be conceptualized as “micro-social structures” that facilitated the collective actions of African-American activists, especially students, across North Carolina and the rest of the South. As a result, during the spring of 1960, sit-ins spread through these networks and centers to every Southern state except Mississippi. Moore's tireless efforts had paid off, and the era of civil rights in America had begun in full force.

== Later life in Washington, D.C. ==
At the height of the Durham movement he had fostered for so long, Moore suddenly left the city. Along with Lawson, he was forced out of King's SCLC after several of the organization's members began to regard him as too radical and a threat. Disillusioned, Moore resigned as pastor of Asbury Temple Methodist Church and moved to Central Africa. Spending several years as a missionary in the Belgian Congo, he gradually underwent a change in his political views, adopting an even more radical, anti-colonial stance. When he returned to the United States, Moore settled down in Washington, D.C. He demonstrated the change in his political ideology by becoming the leader of the D.C. Black United Front, a black nationalist organization. Moore also ran for – and won – a position on the Council of the District of Columbia in 1974. His uncompromising attitude won him many friends and enemies alike. During his term, Moore ran into trouble with the law. Exhibiting behavior that contradicted his peaceful teachings of the past, Moore was convicted in 1976 of assaulting a white tow truck driver and put under probation. In 1981, he violated one of its conditions and served six months in jail after refusing to take a court-ordered psychiatric exam.

Soon after his run-in with the law, Moore turned his sights on economic mobility. He began a career as a “corporate gadfly” and constantly badgered stockholders with questions about the racial biases present in their hiring practices. Moore would later acquire an energy company that regularly received multimillion-dollar contracts from the Potomac Electric Power Company and Washington Gas Light Company. Moore served as the pastor of Elijah Methodist Church in Poolesville, Maryland. In 2002, he made a brief return to the political scene by running against Anthony A. Williams for mayor of Washington, D.C. He failed to drum up the widespread support necessary to mount a serious challenge in the race, however, and did not win.

Reverend Douglas E. Moore died August 22, 2019, after brief hospitalization in Clinton, Maryland. He was 91. The cause of death was Alzheimer's disease and pneumonia.

== Legacy ==
Douglas Moore's legacy is one of an influential civil rights leader in North Carolina and Washington, D.C. Rarely budging from his agenda of activism, which was often perceived as radical, Moore received plenty of criticism from whites and African-Americans alike, especially after the short-term failure that came to be known as the Royal Ice Cream Sit-in. However, his persistence enabled him to help bring about the desegregation of the city of Durham, a cause to which he devoted many years of his life. Moore achieved many successes in his fight against segregation by allying with other prominent civil rights activists and inspiring a new generation of young, African-American student protestors. His efforts as a champion of the sit-in movement helped to popularize its use throughout North Carolina and the South. The sit-in movements had ideological roots in nonviolence and Christian ideology, ideas that Moore also circulated throughout the region. Although he rejected some of the causes he had once espoused so fervently later on in his life, by combining his faith with strong leadership, he was able to help bring about much progress in the area of civil rights during a turbulent time in the history of the United States.

Council of the District of Columbia
Preceded by Sterling Tucker as Vice Chair of the District of Columbia City Council	Chair pro tempore of the Council of the District of Columbia; 1975–1977	Succeeded by Willie Hardy
