= John Nevius =

American lawyer and politician

Chair of the District of Columbia City Council
- In office May 3, 1972 – January 2, 1975
- President: Richard Nixon; Gerald Ford
- Preceded by: Gilbert Hahn
- Succeeded by: Sterling Tucker (D.C. Council)

Member of the District of Columbia City Council
- In office November 3, 1967 – March 13, 1969
- Appointed by: Lyndon B. Johnson
- Preceded by: Position established
- Succeeded by: Jerry A. Moore Jr.

Personal details
- Born: John Avon Nevius; July 15, 1920 Washington, D.C., U.S.
- Died: April 23, 1993 (aged 72) Washington, D.C., U.S.
- Party: Republican
- Education: Princeton University (BA); Georgetown University (LLB)

John Avon Nevius (July 15, 1920 – April 23, 1993) was a member and chair of Washington, DC's pre-Home Rule city council. Nevius was first appointed to the council by President Lyndon Johnson from 1967 to 1969. In 1972, President Richard Nixon appointed him as Chairman of the council. In 1974, the advent of home rule brought DC's first elected council and council chairman. Nevius, a self-described "WASP Republican," did not run for the position, and he was succeeded by Sterling Tucker.

He ran for the first D.C. Delegate to Congress, losing to the Reverend Walter E. Fauntroy, in 1970. He was also a long time member of the Washington Metropolitan Area Transit Administration (WMATA) board of directors during construction of Washington's Metro system, including serving as chairman.

Prior to his public life, Nevius was a graduate of Princeton University's class of 1942. He served as a naval officer in the Pacific during WWII, and returned to Washington, DC to practice law afterwards.

Married to Sheila Sheldon in 1950, Nevius had two children, Katherine and Theodore (Ted). He and his second wife Sally (née Cunningham) had one daughter, Kristina. Sally later gained some notoriety by co-founding the Parents Music Resource Center together with Tipper Gore and several other "Washington wives."

Nevius died at the age of 72 from complications due to lymphoma and ALS (Lou Gehrig's Disease).

== Notes ==
Political offices
Preceded by Gilbert Hahn	Chair of the District of Columbia City Council; 1972–1975	Succeeded by Sterling Tucker as Chair of the Council of the District of Columbia
