= National Training School for Boys =

Former US federal prison

The National Training School For Boys, located in what is now known as the Fort Lincoln area of Washington, D.C., was a Federal Government juvenile correctional institution for offenders under the age of seventeen. The school was governed by a board of trustees, appointed by the President of the United States, upon the recommendation of the Attorney General. The board was authorized, under certain conditions, to release inmates from District of Columbia before their terms had expired. They also had the power to parole boys from other districts of the United States, subject to the approval of the Attorney General.

On 1 July 1939, the board of trustees was abolished, and the School was transferred to the Department of Justice, to be administered by the Director of the Bureau of Prisons. The School continued to function until 15 May 1968, when it was closed down for good.

Charles Manson was sent to the School in 1951.
