= Jerry Gershenhorn =

American historian

Jerry Gershenhorn is an American historian who currently holds the Julius L. Chambers Professorship in American History at North Carolina Central University. He received his PhD from the University of North Carolina at Chapel Hill.

After earning a B.A. in economics and a B.S. in accounting at the State University of New York at Binghamton, Gershenhorn earned graduate degrees in history, an M.A. from North Carolina Central University and a Ph.D. from the University of North Carolina at Chapel Hill. His research and teaching interests are American history, African American history, American Intellectual history, and North Carolina history. In 2004, he published Melville J. Herskovits and the Racial Politics of Knowledge (Lincoln: University of Nebraska Press). He has also published journal articles in the Journal of African American History; Journalism History; the North Carolina Historical Review; and Souls: A Critical Journal of Black Politics, Culture and Society.

He has taught at North Carolina Central University for over twenty years. In 2007, he received the North Carolina Central University Award for Teaching Excellence. He has also taught at Central Carolina Community College, North Carolina A & T State University, St. Augustine's College, and North Carolina State University.

In Spring 2009, he was a Scholar-in-Residence at the Schomburg Center for Research in Black Culture in New York City, where he conducted research on black scholars and the development of African Studies Programs during the early Cold War era. He appeared as an on-screen contributor and served as a consultant for the documentary film "Herskovits at the Heart Of Blackness" (Vital Pictures, 2009). His second book, Louis Austin and the Carolina Times: A Life in the Long Black Freedom Struggle, was published by the University of North Carolina Press in February 2018.

He comments on and illuminates African-American History.

As of April, 2022, he is serving on the board of two organizations - The North Carolina Literary & Historical Association and The North Carolina History Marker Program and in 2018 and 2019 was the president of the Historical Society of North Carolina.

== Works ==
- Melville J. Herskovits and the Racial Politics of Knowledge. University of Nebraska Press (2004)
- Louis Austin and the Carolina Times: A Life in the Long Black Freedom Struggle. University of North Carolina Press (2018)
