= Sterling Tucker =

American politician and activist (1923–2019)

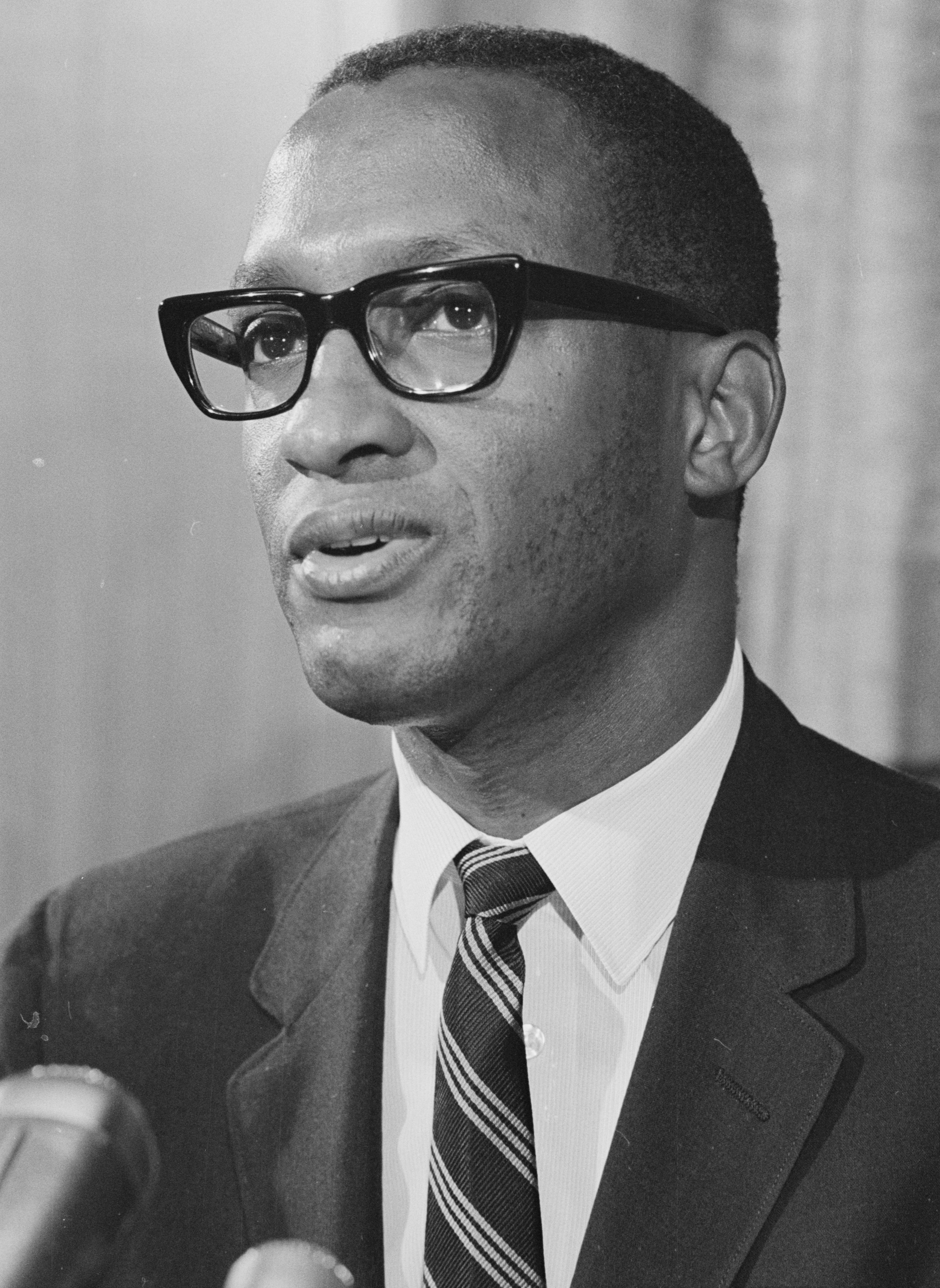
- Tucker in 1967

1st Chair of the Council of the District of Columbia
- In office January 2, 1975 – January 2, 1979
- Preceded by: John Nevius (D.C. City Council)
- Succeeded by: Arrington Dixon

Vice Chair of the District of Columbia City Council
- In office March 13, 1969 – January 2, 1975
- Appointed by: Richard Nixon
- Preceded by: Walter Fauntroy
- Succeeded by: Douglas E. Moore (Chair pro tempore of the D.C. Council)

Personal details
- Born: December 21, 1923 Akron, Ohio, U.S.
- Died: July 14, 2019 (aged 95) Washington, D.C., U.S.
- Party: Democratic
- Spouse: Alloyce (m. 1948)
- Children: 2
- Education: University of Akron (BA)

Sterling Tucker (December 21, 1923 – July 14, 2019) was an American civil and political rights activist and politician in Washington, D.C. He was the first chair of the Council of the District of Columbia and was an unsuccessful candidate for mayor of the city in 1978.

== Early life and education ==
Tucker was born on December 21, 1923, in Akron, Ohio. He was the fourth of eight children. His father was a workforce foreman for the municipal government.

In 1942, Tucker graduated from West High School. In 1946, he graduated from University of Akron with a Bachelor of Arts in sociology. In 1950, he earned a master's degree in psychology from the same school. At college, he met his future wife, Alloyce Robinson.

While in college, Tucker bused tables at the Garden Grille in Akron. He noticed that despite Ohio's public accommodations law, African Americans were routinely turned away. Tucker was fired shortly after insisting that he eat in the main dining room while patronizing the restaurant on his day off.

== Career ==
After graduating, Tucker worked for the National Urban League, first in Canton, Ohio, and in New York City. In 1956, he joined its Washington, D.C., office.

In 1959, Tucker was fined $500 after pleading no-contest to charges of filing fraudulent income tax returns by over-claiming allowable deductions. President Lyndon B. Johnson pardoned him in 1966.

As part of the Poor People's Campaign, along with Reverend Ralph Abernathy and Coretta Scott King, Tucker organized Solidarity Day, a 50,000 member protest in Washington, D.C., on June 19, 1969.

From 1969 to 1974, he served as the vice-chair of the first appointed Council of the District of Columbia and in 1974, he was elected chairman of the council in the first election after District of Columbia home rule was established. He served for one term.

Tucker also served as chairman of the Washington Metropolitan Area Transit Authority. In 1977, he made a pitch to team owners to bring a Major League Baseball team to Washington, D.C.

In 1978, he ran unsuccessfully for mayor against the incumbent Walter Washington and at-large council member Marion Barry. Tucker lost the primary to Barry by 1,500 votes.

In January 1979, President Jimmy Carter nominated Tucker to be Assistant Secretary for the Office of Fair Housing and Equal Opportunity at the United States Department of Housing and Urban Development. He served until the end of Carter's term.

In 1981, he opened a consulting firm, Sterling Tucker and Associates.

In 1989 and 1990, he served as a director of the D.C. Drug Control Policy, working to develop strategies for combating drug usage in Washington D.C.

In 1990, Tucker was chairman of the American Diabetes Association.

== Death ==
Tucker died on July 14, 2019, at the age of 95 in Washington, D.C., from congestive heart failure and kidney failure. His body lay in repose in the John A. Wilson Building on July 23.

Council of the District of Columbia
Preceded by Walter Fauntroy	Vice Chair of the District of Columbia City Council; 1969–1975	Succeeded by Douglas E. Moore as Chair pro tempore of the Council of the District of Columbia
Political offices
Preceded by John Nevius as Chair of the District of Columbia City Council	Chair of the Council of the District of Columbia; 1975–1979	Succeeded by Arrington Dixon
