= The Carolina Times =

American, English-language weekly newspaper

- Type: Weekly newspaper
- Format: Broadsheet
- Founded: 1919
- Ceased publication: 2020
- Language: American English
- Headquarters: Durham, North Carolina
- OCLC number: 2259007

The Carolina Times was a Black newspaper published weekly in Durham, North Carolina and founded in 1919 or 1921. It ceased publication in 2020.

== History ==
In 1921 Charles Arrant founded The Standard Advertiser in Durham, North Carolina. The publication served as the only newspaper for the city's black residents. Arrant was killed in 1922. In 1927, The Standard Advertiser's sports editor Louis Austin acquired a loan from Mechanics and Farmers Bank and purchased the paper. Under Austin's ownership and editorship, the publication's name was changed to The Carolina Times. The paper devoted a significant amount of its news coverage to accounts of racial discrimination. Austin frequently used his editorials to advocate for equal rights. The Carolina Times served as the campaign headquarters for the Durham Committee on Negro Affairs (DCNA), which was later renamed the Durham Committee on the Affairs of Black People.

One notable success that Louis E. Austin had in his fight for equality (of many) was the arrest and conviction of a police officer who assaulted an African-American man. The officer would have not been reprimanded for his actions without the vocal support of The Carolina Times, as well as the efforts of the DCNA. The paper's primary sources of revenue were advertising sales and circulation. Austin's progressive stance and use of the paper for advocacy sometimes angered wealthy blacks in Durham, who in turn refused to place advertisements or grant him loans. On several occasions officials at black banks such as Mechanics and Farmers Bank, feeling that The Carolina Times was a critical resource for the black community, granted Austin loans to continue running the paper. Austin struggled to fund the publication into the early 1950s.

Austin died in 1971, and his daughter, Vivian Edmonds, subsequently assumed control of the paper. On January 14, 1979, the building that housed The Carolina Times was burned to the ground; little survived the blaze, and their entire back stock of papers was destroyed. The authorities suspected that it was arson. Edmonds continued the paper's publication, and had a new issue out that Thursday.

The paper continued to be published by Austin's grandson, Kenneth Edmonds, and is the only black-owned and operated newspaper in Durham. It ceased publication in 2020 following the death of Edmonds.

== Works cited ==
- Gershenhorn, Jerry (2006). "Double V in North Carolina: The Carolina Times and the Struggle for Racial Equality during World War II". Journalism History. 32 (3): 156–167. doi:10.1080/00947679.2006.12062711. S2CID 140888553.
- Gershenhorn, Jerry (2018-02-06). Louis Austin and the Carolina times : a life in the long black freedom struggle. Chapel Hill. ISBN 9781469638775. OCLC 1022117277.
