= 1996 United States presidential election in Oklahoma =

- November 5, 1996

Nominee	Bob Dole	Bill Clinton	Ross Perot
Party	Republican	Democratic	Reform
Home state	Kansas	Arkansas	Texas
Running mate	Jack Kemp	Al Gore	Pat Choate
Electoral vote	8	0	0
Popular vote	582,315	488,105	130,788
Percentage	48.26%	40.45%	10.84%

Dole
40–50%
50–60%
60–70%
70–80%
Clinton
40–50%
50–60%
President before election
Bill Clinton
Democratic
Elected President
Bill Clinton
Democratic

The 1996 United States presidential election in Oklahoma took place on November 5, 1996. All fifty states and the District of Columbia, were part of the 1996 United States presidential election. Voters chose eight electors to the Electoral College, which selected the president and vice president. Oklahoma was won by Kansas Senator Bob Dole, who was running against incumbent United States President Bill Clinton of Arkansas. Clinton ran a second time with former Tennessee Senator Al Gore as vice president, and Dole ran with former New York Congressman Jack Kemp.

This is the last time Sequoyah County, Nowata County, Caddo County, Craig County, Kiowa County, Mayes County, Osage County, Tillman County, Seminole County, Pontotoc County, Garvin County, Cotton County, Carter County, Greer County, Le Flore County, Murray County, Harmon County, Bryan County, McCurtain County, Coal County, Pittsburg County, Johnston County, Marshall County, Jefferson County, Love County, Atoka County, Okfuskee County, Pawnee County, and Pushmataha County voted for a Democratic presidential candidate. Oklahoma weighed in for this election as 4% more third-party than the national average. This remains the last presidential election in which Oklahoma has been decided by a single-digit margin or that the Democratic Party has won more than 40% of the vote; due to its extremely conservative Bible Belt political culture and resulting rightward shift of voters during the 21st century, the state has not been competitive on the presidential level since. Clinton became the first president since statehood to win reelection to the White House without ever carrying Oklahoma.

The presidential election of 1996 was a very multi-partisan election for Oklahoma, with more than eleven percent of the electorate voting for third-party candidates. This is one of the last presidential elections in Oklahoma in which the Southeastern portion of the state turned out in large numbers for the Democratic Party. This may be somewhat attributed to the influence of the politically volatile bordering state of Texas, which can also be seen changing political orientation throughout the 1980s and 1990s from a Democratic area to a largely Republican one, as well as its other neighbor Arkansas, Clinton's home state. In his second bid for the presidency, Ross Perot led the newly reformed Reform Party to gain over 10% of the votes in Oklahoma, and to pull in support nationally as the most popular third-party candidate to run for the U.S. presidency in recent times.

As of the 2024 presidential election, this remains the last time that a Democratic presidential candidate has carried any of Oklahoma's congressional districts (in this case, the 2nd and 3rd districts in the rural east), as well as the last election in which a Democratic presidential candidate carried the entirety of the Choctaw Nation, a majority of the Chickasaw, Cherokee and Creek Nations, or the counties containing the Seminole, Pawnee and Osage Nations.

== Primary elections ==
=== Democratic primary ===
The Oklahoma Democratic presidential primary was held on March 12, 1996, as one of the Democratic Party's statewide nomination contests ahead of the 1996 presidential election. Incumbent President Bill Clinton easily won the primary, facing only minor opposition.

1996 Oklahoma Democratic Primary
Candidate	Votes	%
Bill Clinton	279,454	76.23%
Lyndon LaRouche	46,392	12.65%
Elvena Lloyd-Duffie	40,758	11.12%
Total	366,604	100.00%

== Results ==
1996 United States presidential election in Oklahoma
Party	Candidate	Votes	Percentage	Electoral votes
Republican	Bob Dole	582,315	48.26%	8
Democratic	Bill Clinton (incumbent)	488,105	40.45%	0
Reform	Ross Perot	130,788	10.84%	0
Libertarian	Harry Browne	5,505	0.46%	0
Totals		1,206,713	100.00%	8
Voter Turnout (Voting age/Registered)				50%/61%

=== Results by county ===
County	Bob Dole Republican		Bill Clinton Democratic		Ross Perot Reform		Harry Browne Libertarian		Margin		Total votes cast
County	#	%	#	%	#	%	#	%	#	%	Total votes cast
Adair	2,956	45.33%	2,792	42.82%	751	11.52%	22	0.34%	164	2.51%	6,521
Alfalfa	1,504	56.48%	796	29.89%	348	13.07%	15	0.56%	708	26.59%	2,663
Atoka	1,542	35.26%	2,281	52.16%	532	12.17%	18	0.41%	-739	-16.90%	4,373
Beaver	1,893	72.50%	515	19.72%	199	7.62%	4	0.15%	1,378	52.78%	2,611
Beckham	2,912	44.45%	2,797	42.70%	817	12.47%	25	0.38%	115	1.75%	6,551
Blaine	2,127	46.88%	1,832	40.38%	563	12.41%	15	0.33%	295	6.50%	4,537
Bryan	3,943	34.79%	5,962	52.60%	1,396	12.32%	34	0.30%	-2,019	-17.81%	11,335
Caddo	3,422	35.39%	4,844	50.09%	1,358	14.04%	46	0.48%	-1,422	-14.70%	9,670
Canadian	18,139	59.40%	8,977	29.40%	3,297	10.80%	123	0.40%	9,162	30.00%	30,536
Carter	6,769	42.83%	6,979	44.16%	1,997	12.64%	59	0.37%	-210	-1.33%	15,804
Cherokee	5,046	36.84%	6,817	49.77%	1,777	12.97%	56	0.41%	-1,771	-12.93%	13,696
Choctaw	1,580	29.37%	3,198	59.45%	589	10.95%	12	0.22%	-1,618	-30.08%	5,379
Cimarron	986	67.77%	361	24.81%	102	7.01%	6	0.41%	625	42.96%	1,455
Cleveland	36,457	52.24%	26,038	37.31%	6,785	9.72%	503	0.72%	10,419	14.93%	69,783
Coal	734	32.25%	1,205	52.94%	323	14.19%	14	0.62%	-471	-20.69%	2,276
Comanche	14,461	47.76%	12,841	42.41%	2,819	9.31%	157	0.52%	1,620	5.35%	30,278
Cotton	1,042	38.62%	1,258	46.63%	381	14.12%	17	0.63%	-216	-8.01%	2,698
Craig	2,058	37.51%	2,649	48.29%	758	13.82%	21	0.38%	-591	-10.78%	5,486
Creek	9,861	43.91%	9,674	43.08%	2,837	12.63%	85	0.38%	187	0.83%	22,457
Custer	4,723	47.81%	4,027	40.76%	1,101	11.14%	28	0.28%	696	7.05%	9,879
Delaware	5,230	43.81%	5,094	42.67%	1,573	13.18%	42	0.35%	136	1.14%	11,939
Dewey	1,179	51.24%	816	35.46%	292	12.69%	14	0.61%	363	15.78%	2,301
Ellis	1,090	54.61%	619	31.01%	279	13.98%	8	0.40%	471	23.60%	1,996
Garfield	11,712	53.62%	7,504	34.36%	2,523	11.55%	102	0.47%	4,208	19.26%	21,841
Garvin	3,745	38.34%	4,639	47.50%	1,345	13.77%	38	0.39%	-894	-9.16%	9,767
Grady	7,228	46.34%	6,256	40.11%	2,048	13.13%	66	0.42%	972	6.23%	15,598
Grant	1,382	52.09%	867	32.68%	384	14.47%	20	0.75%	515	19.41%	2,653
Greer	905	35.96%	1,240	49.26%	361	14.34%	11	0.44%	-335	-13.30%	2,517
Harmon	448	33.76%	729	54.94%	143	10.78%	7	0.53%	-281	-21.18%	1,327
Harper	1,036	58.27%	511	28.74%	219	12.32%	12	0.67%	525	29.53%	1,778
Haskell	1,442	30.01%	2,762	57.48%	590	12.28%	11	0.23%	-1,320	-27.47%	4,805
Hughes	1,510	30.13%	2,748	54.83%	730	14.57%	24	0.48%	-1,238	-24.70%	5,012
Jackson	4,422	51.53%	3,245	37.81%	892	10.39%	23	0.27%	1,177	13.72%	8,582
Jefferson	865	32.69%	1,430	54.04%	337	12.74%	14	0.53%	-565	-21.35%	2,646
Johnston	1,229	32.63%	1,998	53.04%	532	14.12%	8	0.21%	-769	-20.41%	3,767
Kay	9,741	49.92%	6,882	35.27%	2,785	14.27%	106	0.54%	2,859	14.65%	19,514
Kingfisher	3,423	60.27%	1,626	28.63%	621	10.94%	9	0.16%	1,797	31.64%	5,679
Kiowa	1,638	39.68%	1,973	47.80%	510	12.35%	7	0.17%	-335	-8.12%	4,128
Latimer	1,189	29.70%	2,222	55.51%	578	14.44%	14	0.35%	-1,033	-25.81%	4,003
LeFlore	5,689	39.74%	6,831	47.72%	1,721	12.02%	75	0.52%	-1,142	-7.98%	14,316
Lincoln	5,243	47.14%	4,332	38.95%	1,500	13.49%	47	0.42%	911	8.19%	11,122
Logan	5,949	48.46%	4,854	39.54%	1,410	11.48%	64	0.52%	1,095	8.92%	12,277
Love	1,224	37.05%	1,675	50.70%	385	11.65%	20	0.61%	-451	-13.65%	3,304
McClain	4,363	46.22%	3,753	39.76%	1,289	13.66%	34	0.36%	610	6.46%	9,439
McCurtain	3,892	39.82%	4,350	44.51%	1,483	15.17%	49	0.50%	-458	-4.69%	9,774
McIntosh	2,400	31.21%	4,219	54.86%	1,044	13.57%	28	0.36%	-1,819	-23.65%	7,691
Major	2,188	62.30%	900	25.63%	410	11.67%	14	0.40%	1,288	36.67%	3,512
Marshall	1,605	32.67%	2,624	53.41%	663	13.49%	21	0.43%	-1,019	-20.74%	4,913
Mayes	5,268	39.59%	6,377	47.92%	1,617	12.15%	46	0.35%	-1,109	-8.33%	13,308
Murray	1,712	33.78%	2,620	51.70%	723	14.27%	13	0.26%	-908	-17.92%	5,068
Muskogee	8,974	35.64%	12,963	51.48%	3,163	12.56%	80	0.32%	-3,989	-15.84%	25,180
Noble	2,318	48.38%	1,756	36.65%	694	14.49%	23	0.48%	562	11.73%	4,791
Nowata	1,457	37.80%	1,788	46.39%	586	15.20%	23	0.60%	-331	-8.59%	3,854
Okfuskee	1,380	34.41%	2,074	51.72%	536	13.37%	20	0.50%	-694	-17.31%	4,010
Oklahoma	120,429	54.68%	80,438	36.52%	18,411	8.36%	975	0.44%	39,991	18.16%	220,253
Okmulgee	4,246	31.84%	7,555	56.65%	1,487	11.15%	49	0.37%	-3,309	-24.81%	13,337
Osage	5,827	38.38%	7,342	48.36%	1,938	12.76%	76	0.50%	-1,515	-9.98%	15,183
Ottawa	4,127	35.87%	5,844	50.80%	1,496	13.00%	37	0.32%	-1,717	-14.93%	11,504
Pawnee	2,560	42.62%	2,663	44.34%	756	12.59%	27	0.45%	-103	-1.72%	6,006
Payne	11,686	48.07%	9,985	41.08%	2,472	10.17%	165	0.68%	1,701	6.99%	24,308
Pittsburg	5,966	35.58%	8,475	50.55%	2,217	13.22%	108	0.64%	-2,509	-14.97%	16,766
Pontotoc	5,366	39.42%	6,470	47.53%	1,712	12.58%	65	0.48%	-1,104	-8.11%	13,613
Pottawatomie	9,802	45.06%	9,141	42.02%	2,724	12.52%	86	0.40%	661	3.04%	21,753
Pushmataha	1,458	33.59%	2,270	52.29%	588	13.55%	25	0.58%	-812	-18.70%	4,341
Roger Mills	959	49.61%	733	37.92%	233	12.05%	8	0.41%	226	11.69%	1,933
Rogers	12,883	50.41%	9,544	37.35%	3,022	11.83%	105	0.41%	3,339	13.06%	25,554
Seminole	2,935	35.67%	4,225	51.34%	1,041	12.65%	28	0.34%	-1,290	-15.67%	8,229
Sequoyah	4,733	39.04%	5,665	46.73%	1,673	13.80%	53	0.44%	-932	-7.69%	12,124
Stephens	8,144	45.81%	7,248	40.77%	2,312	13.01%	72	0.41%	896	5.04%	17,776
Texas	4,139	67.95%	1,408	23.12%	518	8.50%	26	0.43%	2,731	44.83%	6,091
Tillman	1,346	36.79%	1,827	49.93%	471	12.87%	15	0.41%	-481	-13.14%	3,659
Tulsa	111,243	53.65%	76,924	37.10%	18,201	8.78%	988	0.48%	34,319	16.55%	207,356
Wagoner	9,392	48.02%	7,749	39.62%	2,357	12.05%	60	0.31%	1,643	8.40%	19,558
Washington	11,605	56.08%	6,732	32.53%	2,255	10.90%	102	0.49%	4,873	23.55%	20,694
Washita	1,994	42.65%	1,913	40.92%	748	16.00%	20	0.43%	81	1.73%	4,675
Woods	2,151	52.44%	1,431	34.89%	497	12.12%	23	0.56%	720	17.55%	4,102
Woodward	4,093	54.59%	2,403	32.05%	963	12.84%	39	0.52%	1,690	22.54%	7,498
Totals	582,315	48.26%	488,105	40.45%	130,788	10.84%	5,505	0.46%	94,210	7.81%	1,206,713

==== Counties that flipped from Democratic to Republican ====
- Beckham
- Delaware
- Stephens
- Washita

==== Counties that flipped from Republican to Democratic ====
- Pawnee

=== By congressional district ===
Dole won four of six congressional districts, with the remaining two going to Clinton, including two that elected Republicans.

District	Dole	Clinton	Perot	Representative
1st	54%	37%	9%	Steve Largent
2nd	40%	48%	13%	Tom Coburn
3rd	40%	48%	13%	Bill Brewster (104th Congress)
3rd	40%	48%	13%	Wes Watkins (105th Congress)
4th	49%	40%	11%	J. C. Watts
5th	59%	31%	10%	Ernest Istook
6th	48%	42%	11%	Frank Lucas

== Electors ==
Reform: Dale Barlow, Grace Rayedelle Hill, Syvia Suggs, H. Kelly Haynes, Emmy Butler, Vivian Winterman, Jack Newkirk, Patt Cameron

Republican: J. Michael Brown, Steven F. Garrett, Skip Healey, Leo F. Herlacher, Dixie I. Galloway, Dale Switzer, Paul E. Thornbrugh, Gary W. Banz

Libertarian: Randy Ashbrook, Sharon Lynn Atherton, Roger Bloxham, Charles Burris, Steven B. Galpin, C. Michael Todd, Chad Vanis, Robert Waldrop

Democrat: Carl Albert, Julian J. Rothbaum, Thomas Dee Frasier, George Lee Stidham, Elizabeth Whetsel, Betty J. McElderry, Lorray Dyson, Marjean Mitchell

== See also ==
- United States presidential elections in Oklahoma
- Presidency of Bill Clinton
