= 1996 United States presidential election in Illinois =

- November 5, 1996
- Turnout: 66.30% ▼11.94 pp

Nominee	Bill Clinton	Bob Dole	Ross Perot
Party	Democratic	Republican	Reform
Home state	Arkansas	Kansas	Texas
Running mate	Al Gore	Jack Kemp	Pat Choate
Electoral vote	22	0	0
Popular vote	2,341,744	1,587,021	346,408
Percentage	54.32%	36.81%	8.03%

Clinton
40–50%
50–60%
60–70%
Dole
40–50%
50–60%
President before election
Bill Clinton
Democratic
Elected President
Bill Clinton
Democratic

The 1996 United States presidential election in Illinois took place on November 5, 1996, as part of the 1996 United States presidential election. Voters chose 22 representatives, or electors to the Electoral College, who voted for president and vice president.

Illinois was won by President Bill Clinton (D) over Senator Bob Dole (R-KS), with Clinton winning 54.32% to 36.81% for a margin of 17.51%. Billionaire businessman Ross Perot (Reform Party of the United States of America-TX) finished in third, with 8.03 percent of the popular vote.

As of the 2024 presidential election, this is the last election in which Bond County, Christian County, Clay County, Clinton County, Fayette County, Greene County, Hamilton County, Hancock County, Hardin County, Jefferson County, Jersey County, Lawrence County, Marion County, Marshall County, Massac County, Moultrie County, Piatt County, Pike County, Pope County, Randolph County, Saline County, Shelby County, Union County, White County, and Williamson County voted for a Democratic presidential candidate. This is the last time a Democrat carried at least half of the counties in Illinois.

== Primaries ==
=== Turnout ===
For the state-run primaries (Democratic, Republican, and Libertarian), turnout was 29%, with 1,804,626 votes cast. For the general election, turnout was 66.30%, with 4,418,270 votes cast.

State-run primaries were held for the Democratic, Republican, and Libertarian parties on March 19.

=== Democratic primary ===
1996 Illinois Democratic presidential primary
- March 19, 1996
Candidate	Bill Clinton
Home state	Arkansas
Popular vote	770,001
Percentage	96.17%

The 1996 Illinois Democratic presidential primary was held on March 19, 1996, in the U.S. state of Illinois as one of the Democratic Party's statewide nomination contests ahead of the 1996 presidential election.

Incumbent president Bill Clinton secured a victory with no major opposition.

1996 Illinois Democratic presidential primary
Candidate	Votes	%	Delegates
Bill Clinton (incumbent)	770,001	96.17	
Elvena Lloyd-Duffie	16,045	2.00	0
Lyndon H. LaRouche Jr.	14,624	1.83	0
Heather Anne Harder (write-in)	6	0.00	0
Total	800,676	100%	

=== Republican primary ===
1996 Illinois Republican presidential primary
- March 19, 1996

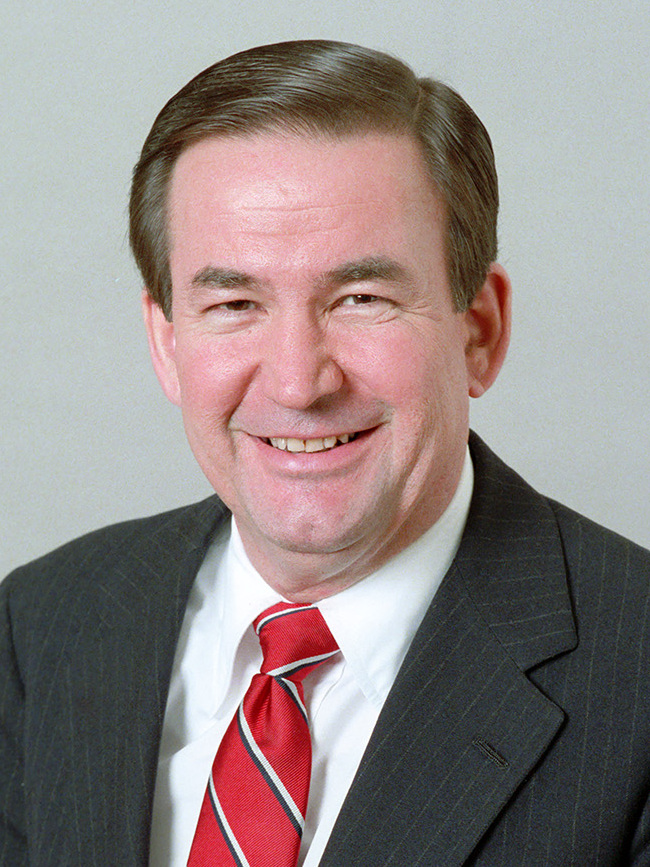
Candidate	Bob Dole	Pat Buchanan
Home state	Kansas	Virginia
Popular vote	532,467	186,177
Percentage	65.07%	22.75%

The 1996 Illinois Republican presidential primary was held on March 19, 1996, in the U.S. state of Illinois as one of the Republican Party's statewide nomination contests ahead of the 1996 presidential election.

1996 Illinois Republican presidential primary
Candidate	Votes	%	Delegates
Bob Dole	532,467	65.07	
Patrick J. Buchannan	186,177	22.75	
Steve Forbes withdrawn	39,906	4.88	
Alan L. Keyes	30,052	3.67	
Lamar Alexander withdrawn	12,585	1.54	
Richard G. Lugar withdrawn	8,286	1.01	
Phil Gramm withdrawn	6,696	0.82	
Morry Taylor withdrawn	2,189	0.27	
V.A. Kelly (write-in)	6	0.00	
Total	818,364	100%	

=== Libertarian ===
1996 Illinois Libertarian presidential primary
- March 19, 1996
Candidate	Harry Browne	Irwin Schiff
Home state	Tennessee	Connecticut
Popular vote	1,278	450
Percentage	73.96%	26.04%

The 1996 Illinois Libertarian presidential primary was held on March 19, 1996, in the U.S. state of Illinois as one of the Libertarian Party's statewide nomination contests ahead of the 1996 presidential election. It was a non-binding preference primary, from which no delegates were awarded.

1996 Illinois Libertarian presidential primary
Candidate	Votes	%
Harry Browne	1,278	73.96
Irwin Schiff	450	26.04
Total	1,728	100%

== Results ==
1996 United States presidential election in Illinois
Party	Candidate	Running mate	Votes	Percentage	Electoral votes
Democratic	Bill Clinton (Incumbent)	Al Gore (Incumbent)	2,341,744	54.32%	22
Republican	Bob Dole	Jack Kemp	1,587,021	36.81%	0
Reform	Ross Perot	Patrick Choate	346,408	8.03%	0
Libertarian	Harry Browne	Jo Jorgensen	22,548	0.52%	0
U.S. Taxpayers' Party	Howard Phillips	Joseph Zdonczyk (Note: Illinois was one of the states where Howard Phillips's running mate (Herbert Titus) was replaced on the ballot by Joseph Zdonczyk.)	7,606	0.17%	0
Natural Law	Dr. John Hagelin	Dr. V. Tompkins	4,606	0.10%	0
Write-in	Ralph Nader		1,447	0.03%	0
No party	Write-in		10	0.00%	0
Write-in	Earl Dodge		1	0.00%	0
Total			4,311,191	100%	

=== Results by county ===
County	Bill Clinton Democratic		Bob Dole Republican		Ross Perot Reform		Various candidates Other parties		Margin		Total votes cast
County	#	%	#	%	#	%	#	%	#	%	Total votes cast
Adams	11,336	39.90%	13,836	48.70%	3,069	10.80%	170	0.60%	-2,500	-8.80%	28,321
Alexander	2,753	63.96%	1,212	28.16%	321	7.46%	18	0.42%	1,541	35.80%	4,296
Bond	3,213	46.10%	3,018	43.30%	685	9.83%	54	0.77%	195	2.80%	6,938
Boone	5,345	41.09%	6,181	47.51%	1,377	10.58%	106	0.81%	-836	-6.42%	12,939
Brown	997	43.40%	1,053	45.84%	237	10.32%	10	0.44%	-56	-2.44%	2,290
Bureau	7,651	47.60%	6,528	40.61%	1,798	11.19%	96	0.60%	1,123	6.99%	16,011
Calhoun	1,676	55.63%	941	31.23%	363	12.05%	33	1.10%	735	24.40%	3,003
Carroll	2,926	43.04%	3,029	44.55%	792	11.65%	52	0.76%	-103	-1.51%	6,759
Cass	2,834	50.01%	2,214	39.07%	589	10.39%	30	0.53%	620	10.94%	5,653
Champaign	32,454	48.86%	28,232	42.50%	4,806	7.23%	937	1.41%	4,222	6.36%	65,884
Christian	7,431	50.08%	5,563	37.49%	1,727	11.64%	116	0.78%	1,868	12.59%	14,778
Clark	2,995	41.48%	3,409	47.22%	781	10.82%	35	0.48%	-414	-5.74%	7,201
Clay	2,750	44.16%	2,703	43.40%	719	11.54%	56	0.90%	47	0.76%	6,206
Clinton	6,104	44.09%	6,065	43.81%	1,580	11.41%	95	0.69%	39	0.28%	13,797
Coles	8,950	46.38%	8,038	41.65%	2,137	11.07%	173	0.90%	912	4.73%	19,215
Cook	1,153,289	66.79%	461,557	26.73%	96,633	5.60%	15,187	0.88%	691,732	40.06%	1,716,586
Crawford	3,627	41.72%	3,965	45.61%	1,057	12.16%	44	0.51%	-338	-3.89%	8,663
Cumberland	1,776	39.74%	2,002	44.80%	657	14.70%	34	0.76%	-226	-5.06%	4,449
DeKalb	12,715	44.57%	12,380	43.40%	3,009	10.55%	423	1.48%	335	1.17%	28,226
DeWitt	2,878	43.68%	2,978	45.20%	694	10.53%	39	0.59%	-100	-1.52%	6,564
Douglas	2,955	42.14%	3,272	46.66%	740	10.55%	46	0.66%	-317	-4.52%	6,989
DuPage	129,709	39.97%	164,630	50.74%	27,419	8.45%	2,728	0.84%	-34,921	-10.77%	322,688
Edgar	3,552	42.78%	3,746	45.12%	935	11.26%	69	0.83%	-194	-2.34%	8,273
Edwards	1,089	35.10%	1,613	51.98%	384	12.38%	17	0.55%	-524	-16.88%	3,096
Effingham	4,825	33.97%	7,696	54.18%	1,555	10.95%	128	0.90%	-2,871	-20.21%	14,134
Fayette	3,887	44.21%	3,881	44.14%	964	10.96%	60	0.68%	6	0.07%	8,769
Ford	2,065	35.79%	3,077	53.33%	590	10.23%	38	0.66%	-1,012	-17.54%	5,753
Franklin	9,814	56.54%	5,354	30.84%	2,096	12.08%	94	0.54%	4,460	25.70%	17,310
Fulton	8,857	56.39%	5,155	32.82%	1,610	10.25%	84	0.53%	3,702	23.57%	15,663
Gallatin	2,113	60.15%	856	24.37%	527	15.00%	17	0.48%	1,257	35.78%	3,505
Greene	2,734	46.07%	2,245	37.83%	903	15.22%	52	0.88%	489	8.24%	5,909
Grundy	6,759	45.36%	6,177	41.45%	1,860	12.48%	106	0.71%	582	3.91%	14,839
Hamilton	2,242	49.72%	1,677	37.19%	560	12.42%	30	0.67%	565	12.53%	4,493
Hancock	4,001	43.59%	3,961	43.16%	1,148	12.51%	68	0.74%	40	0.43%	9,140
Hardin	1,323	50.55%	790	30.19%	485	18.53%	19	0.73%	533	20.36%	2,606
Henderson	1,953	53.97%	1,233	34.07%	408	11.27%	25	0.69%	720	19.90%	3,611
Henry	11,201	51.15%	8,393	38.33%	2,194	10.02%	109	0.50%	2,808	12.82%	21,839
Iroquois	4,559	35.79%	6,564	51.53%	1,522	11.95%	92	0.72%	-2,005	-15.74%	12,684
Jackson	12,214	55.49%	7,422	33.72%	2,082	9.46%	293	1.33%	4,792	21.77%	21,860
Jasper	2,038	41.16%	2,234	45.12%	641	12.95%	38	0.77%	-196	-3.96%	4,930
Jefferson	7,263	48.48%	5,937	39.63%	1,647	10.99%	134	0.89%	1,326	8.85%	14,924
Jersey	4,275	48.77%	3,211	36.63%	1,186	13.53%	94	1.07%	1,064	12.14%	8,721
Jo Daviess	4,171	44.82%	3,915	42.07%	1,131	12.15%	89	0.96%	256	2.75%	9,266
Johnson	2,009	40.75%	2,241	45.46%	640	12.98%	40	0.81%	-232	-4.71%	4,906
Kane	47,902	41.77%	54,375	47.41%	11,270	9.83%	1,146	1.00%	-6,473	-5.64%	113,983
Kankakee	16,820	47.73%	14,595	41.41%	3,574	10.14%	252	0.72%	2,225	6.32%	35,097
Kendall	6,499	36.78%	8,958	50.69%	2,055	11.63%	160	0.91%	-2,459	-13.91%	17,575
Knox	12,487	55.38%	7,822	34.69%	2,096	9.30%	143	0.63%	4,665	20.69%	22,454
Lake	93,315	45.57%	93,149	45.49%	16,640	8.13%	1,660	0.81%	166	0.08%	203,702
LaSalle	21,643	50.94%	15,299	36.01%	5,259	12.38%	290	0.68%	6,344	14.93%	42,298
Lawrence	2,871	44.92%	2,568	40.18%	916	14.33%	37	0.58%	303	4.74%	6,369
Lee	5,895	41.57%	6,677	47.08%	1,520	10.72%	90	0.63%	-782	-5.51%	14,128
Livingston	5,641	38.15%	7,653	51.75%	1,409	9.53%	85	0.57%	-2,012	-13.60%	14,737
Logan	4,618	37.41%	6,518	52.80%	1,141	9.24%	68	0.55%	-1,900	-15.39%	12,308
Macon	24,256	51.35%	18,161	38.45%	4,540	9.61%	278	0.59%	6,095	12.90%	47,063
Macoupin	11,107	52.70%	7,235	34.33%	2,532	12.01%	201	0.95%	3,872	18.37%	21,005
Madison	53,568	53.26%	35,758	35.55%	10,121	10.06%	1,126	1.12%	17,810	17.71%	100,101
Marion	7,792	49.43%	5,999	38.06%	1,825	11.58%	147	0.93%	1,793	11.37%	15,681
Marshall	2,640	46.20%	2,453	42.93%	586	10.26%	35	0.61%	187	3.27%	5,693
Mason	3,385	52.53%	2,430	37.71%	600	9.31%	29	0.45%	955	14.82%	6,425
Massac	2,841	46.90%	2,507	41.38%	675	11.14%	35	0.58%	334	5.52%	6,037
McDonough	5,632	46.80%	5,049	41.95%	1,217	10.11%	137	1.14%	583	4.85%	11,962
McHenry	31,240	37.52%	41,136	49.41%	10,082	12.11%	798	0.96%	-9,896	-11.89%	82,780
McLean	22,708	42.50%	26,428	49.46%	3,816	7.14%	483	0.90%	-3,720	-6.96%	53,088
Menard	2,204	37.56%	3,106	52.93%	534	9.10%	24	0.41%	-902	-15.37%	5,857
Mercer	4,278	54.17%	2,688	34.04%	889	11.26%	42	0.53%	1,590	20.13%	7,871
Monroe	4,798	41.60%	5,350	46.38%	1,276	11.06%	111	0.96%	-552	-4.78%	11,500
Montgomery	6,338	50.18%	4,770	37.76%	1,436	11.37%	87	0.69%	1,568	12.42%	12,584
Morgan	6,150	43.19%	6,352	44.61%	1,633	11.47%	103	0.72%	-202	-1.42%	14,179
Moultrie	2,629	48.23%	2,199	40.34%	596	10.93%	27	0.50%	430	7.89%	5,430
Ogle	6,765	36.90%	9,558	52.13%	1,876	10.23%	136	0.74%	-2,793	-15.23%	18,251
Peoria	37,383	50.45%	30,990	41.82%	5,220	7.04%	509	0.69%	6,393	8.63%	73,773
Perry	5,347	53.90%	3,237	32.63%	1,262	12.72%	75	0.76%	2,110	21.27%	9,898
Piatt	3,274	44.17%	3,265	44.05%	818	11.04%	55	0.74%	9	0.12%	7,383
Pike	3,604	45.32%	3,225	40.56%	1,039	13.07%	84	1.06%	379	4.76%	7,914
Pope	915	44.55%	850	41.38%	277	13.49%	12	0.58%	65	3.17%	2,047
Pulaski	1,524	54.16%	1,036	36.82%	235	8.35%	19	0.68%	488	17.34%	2,805
Putnam	1,425	51.56%	987	35.71%	322	11.65%	30	1.09%	438	15.85%	2,745
Randolph	7,419	50.65%	5,422	37.02%	1,698	11.59%	108	0.74%	1,997	13.63%	14,591
Richland	2,679	39.31%	3,137	46.03%	927	13.60%	72	1.06%	-458	-6.72%	6,789
Rock Island	34,822	57.13%	20,626	33.84%	5,135	8.42%	372	0.61%	14,196	23.29%	60,718
Saline	6,156	52.77%	3,693	31.66%	1,752	15.02%	64	0.55%	2,463	21.11%	11,624
Sangamon	38,902	44.15%	42,174	47.87%	6,446	7.32%	583	0.66%	-3,272	-3.72%	87,791
Schuyler	1,636	43.64%	1,597	42.60%	483	12.88%	33	0.88%	39	1.04%	3,729
Scott	1,012	39.87%	1,112	43.81%	396	15.60%	18	0.71%	-100	-3.94%	2,528
Shelby	4,249	43.41%	4,215	43.06%	1,262	12.89%	62	0.63%	34	0.35%	9,756
St. Clair	53,405	56.56%	33,066	35.02%	7,027	7.44%	931	0.99%	20,339	21.54%	93,908
Stark	1,262	44.06%	1,278	44.62%	312	10.89%	12	0.42%	-16	-0.56%	2,859
Stephenson	7,145	39.42%	8,871	48.94%	1,940	10.70%	169	0.93%	-1,726	-9.52%	18,020
Tazewell	24,139	44.97%	24,395	45.45%	4,814	8.97%	330	0.61%	-256	-0.48%	53,448
Union	4,252	51.34%	3,147	38.00%	832	10.05%	51	0.62%	1,105	13.34%	8,264
Vermilion	15,525	49.55%	12,015	38.35%	3,577	11.42%	212	0.68%	3,510	11.20%	31,175
Wabash	2,177	41.28%	2,381	45.15%	683	12.95%	33	0.63%	-204	-3.87%	5,256
Warren	3,500	48.28%	2,974	41.02%	742	10.23%	34	0.47%	526	7.26%	7,227
Washington	2,744	39.61%	3,339	48.20%	790	11.40%	54	0.78%	-595	-8.59%	6,902
Wayne	3,054	37.52%	4,029	49.50%	999	12.27%	58	0.71%	-975	-11.98%	8,114
White	3,553	48.33%	2,878	39.15%	888	12.08%	33	0.45%	675	9.18%	7,335
Whiteside	11,913	51.03%	8,859	37.95%	2,436	10.44%	136	0.58%	3,054	13.08%	23,261
Will	69,354	46.76%	62,506	42.15%	15,485	10.44%	959	0.65%	6,848	4.61%	147,689
Williamson	12,510	49.50%	9,734	38.52%	2,877	11.38%	151	0.60%	2,776	10.98%	25,202
Winnebago	46,264	46.31%	44,479	44.52%	8,192	8.20%	975	0.98%	1,785	1.79%	99,250
Woodford	5,270	35.03%	8,527	56.68%	1,170	7.78%	76	0.51%	-3,257	-21.65%	14,997
Totals	2,341,744	54.32%	1,587,021	36.81%	346,408	8.03%	36,218	0.84%	754,723	17.51%	4,311,391

==== Counties that flipped from Democratic to Republican ====
- Brown
- Clark
- Crawford
- Cumberland
- Douglas
- Edgar
- Johnson
- Monroe
- Richland
- Sangamon
- Tazewell

==== Counties that flipped from Republican to Democratic ====
- Grundy
- Jo Daviess
- Lake

==== By congressional district ====
Clinton won 14 of 20 congressional districts, including three which elected Republicans, while the remaining six districts were won by Dole.

District	Clinton	Dole	Perot	Representative
1st	86.0%	11.0%	3.1%	Bobby Rush
2nd	85.7%	11.1%	3.2%	Jesse Jackson Jr.
3rd	53.7%	37.1%	9.2%	Bill Lipinski
4th	80.6%	14.4%	5.1%	Luis Gutiérrez
5th	63.4%	29.8%	6.8%	Michael Flanagan
5th	63.4%	29.8%	6.8%	Rod Blagojevich
6th	42.8%	48.5%	8.6%	Henry Hyde
7th	83.2%	14.0%	2.7%	Cardiss Collins
7th	83.2%	14.0%	2.7%	Danny Davis
8th	41.0%	49.8%	9.2%	Phil Crane
9th	69.2%	26.0%	4.8%	Sidney R. Yates
10th	50.3%	43.7%	6.0%	John Porter
11th	51.2%	38.2%	10.6%	Jerry Weller
12th	56.6%	34.1%	9.3%	Jerry Costello
13th	41.4%	50.0%	8.6%	Harris Fawell
14th	41.7%	48.1%	10.3%	Dennis Hastert
15th	45.8%	45.3%	8.9%	Tom Ewing
16th	42.3%	47.5%	10.3%	Don Manzullo
17th	51.6%	38.5%	10%	Lane Evans
18th	44.7%	47.0%	8.3%	Ray LaHood
19th	47.3%	40.8%	11.9%	Glenn Poshard
20th	47.9%	41.3%	10.8%	Dick Durbin
20th	47.9%	41.3%	10.8%	John Shimkus

== See also ==
- Presidency of Bill Clinton
- United States presidential elections in Illinois
