= 1997 Council of the District of Columbia special election =

US election

1997 Council of the District of Columbia special elections

3 of the 13 seats in the Council of the District of Columbia 7 seats needed for a majority

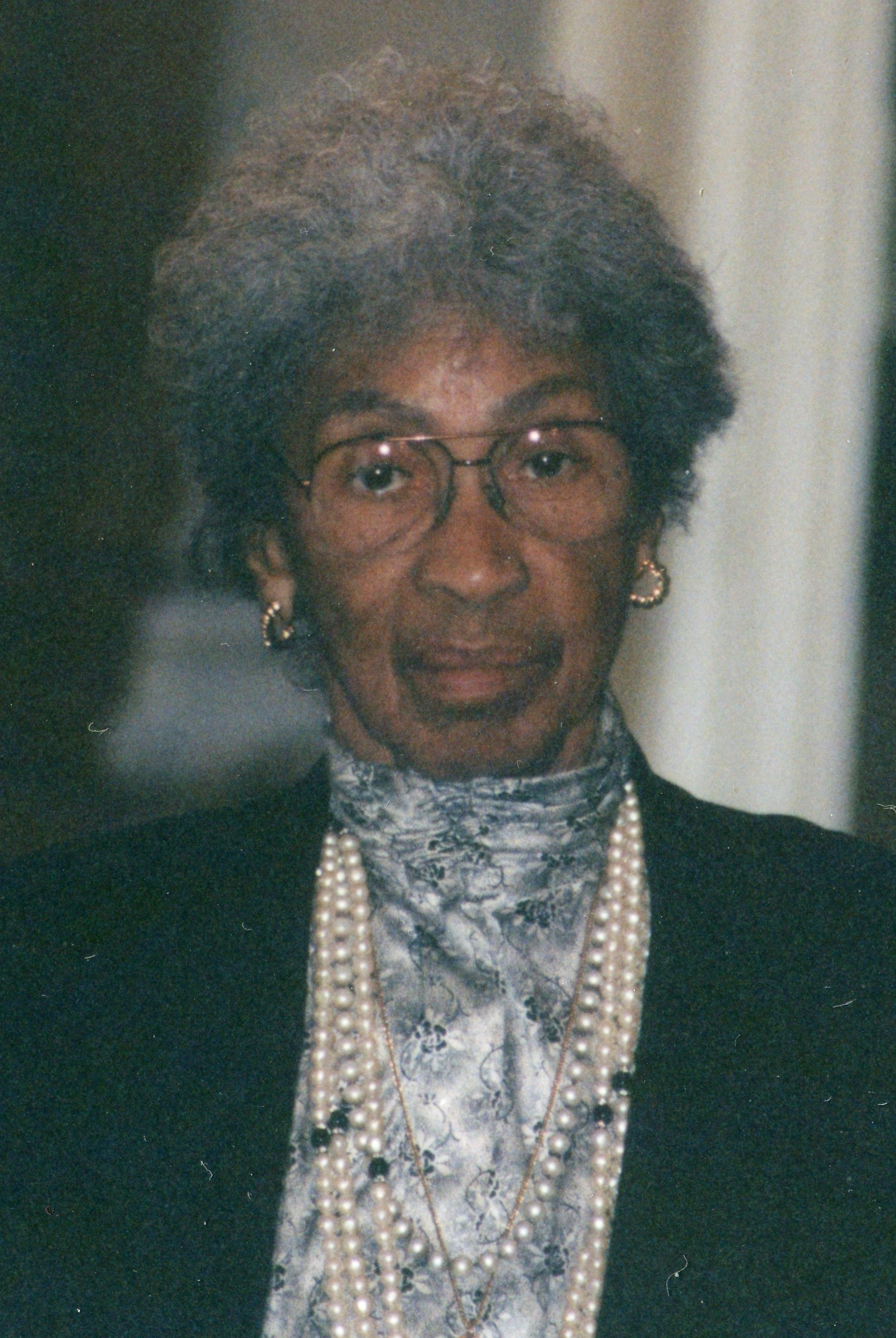

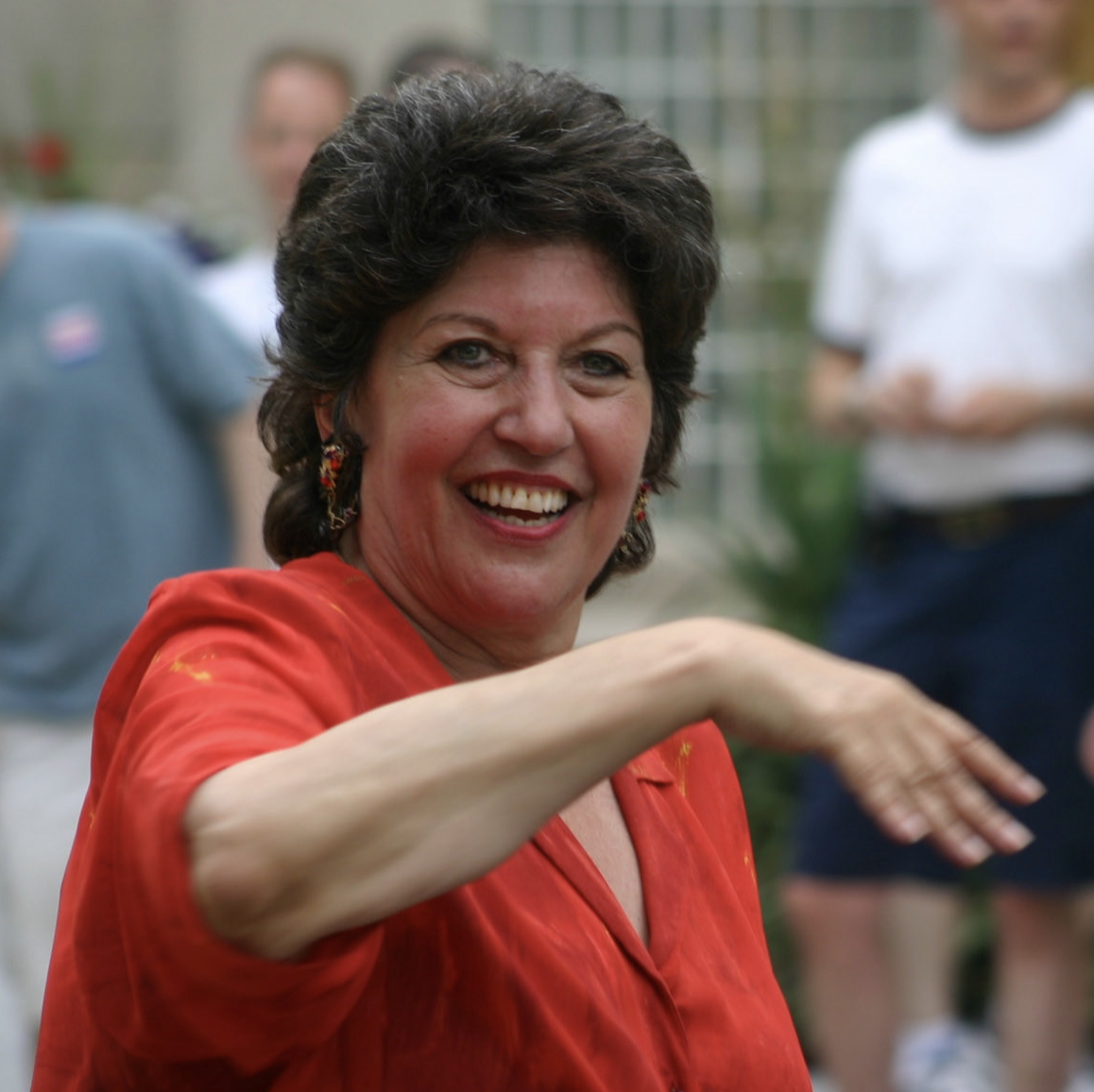
	Majority party	Minority party	Third party
Leader	Vacant	Hilda Mason	Carol Schwartz
Party	Democratic	DC Statehood	Republican
Seats before	11	1	1
Seats after	10	1	2
Seat change	▼1	Steady	▲1

The 1997 Council of the District of Columbia special elections were held on April 29, July 22, and December 2 to elect new members to the then-vacated positions of Ward 6 Councilmember, Council Chairperson, and At-large Councilmember respectively. All candidates, regardless of party affiliation, appear on one ballot for a special election in the District of Columbia. The individual who receives a plurality of votes is the winning candidate.

== Chairperson ==
1997 Council of the District of Columbia Chairperson special election
- July 22, 1997
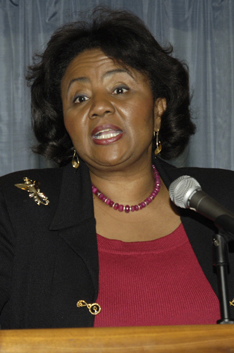

Nominee	Linda Cropp	Mary Martin
Party	Democratic	Socialist Workers
Popular vote	16,151	1,459
Percentage	88.66%	8.01%
Chairperson before election
Linda Cropp
(interim)
Democratic
Elected Chairperson
Linda Cropp
Democratic

Incumbent chairman David A. Clarke had died on March 27 of Primary central nervous system lymphoma, and was replaced on an interim basis by incumbent At-large Councilmember Linda Cropp. She was contested in the July 22 special election by Socialist Workers Party candidate Mary Martin.

=== Candidates ===
- Linda Cropp, interim Chairperson and elected Democratic At-large Councilmember
- Mary Martin, activist

Endorsements

Linda Cropp

Publications

- The Washington Post

=== Special Election ===
1997 Council of the District of Columbia Chairperson special election
Party	Candidate	Votes	%
Democratic	Linda Cropp	16,151	88.66%
Socialist Workers	Mary Martin	1,459	9.01%
Write-in		606	3.33%
Total votes		1,816	100%

== At-large ==
1997 Council of the District of Columbia At-large special election
- December 2, 1997
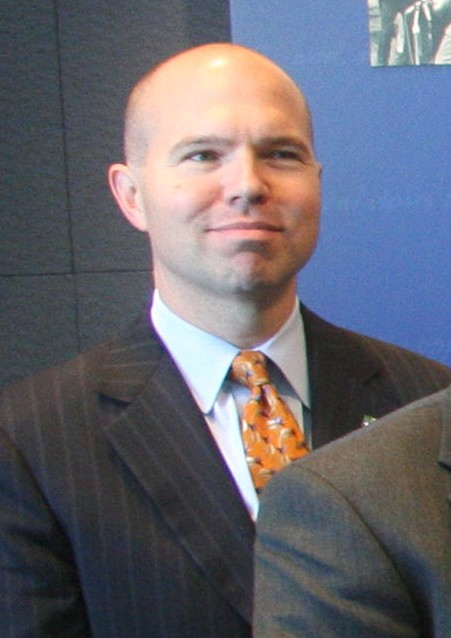

Nominee	David Catania	Arrington Dixon
Party	Republican	Democratic
Popular vote	10,818	9,621
Percentage	42.54%	37.84%
Nominee	Philip Heinrich	Mary Martin
Party	Democratic	Socialist Workers
Popular vote	4,240	464
Percentage	16.67%	1.82%
Councilmember before election
Arrington Dixon
(interim)
Democratic
Elected Councilmember
David Catania
Republican

Incumbent At-large Coucncilmember Linda Cropp's victory in the July 22 special election for chairperson of the Council resulted in a vacancy in the seat, triggering another special election to be held on December 2. Former Council Chairman and Democrat Arrington Dixon was appointed to serve as the interim At-large councilmember. He was challenged by 3 candidates.

=== Candidates ===
- David Catania, lawyer and Ward 1 Advisory Neighborhood Commissioner
- Arrington Dixon, interim At-large Councilmember
- Philip Heinrich, reform activist
- Mary Martin, activist

Endorsements

David Catania

Publications

- The Washington Post

Debates

Debates and forums for At-large candidates
Date	Place	Host	Participants			
P Participant. I Invitee. A Absent. N Confirmed non-invitee. O Out of race (exploring, suspended, or not yet entered)			Catania	Dixon	Heinrich	Martin
11 November 1997	St. Thomas' Episcopal Church	Washington Blade	P	P	P	P

=== Special Election ===
1997 Council of the District of Columbia At-large special election
Party	Candidate	Votes	%
Republican	David Catania	10,818	42.54%
Democratic	Arrington Dixon	9,621	37.84%
Democratic	Philip Heinrich	4,240	16.67%
Socialist Workers	Mary Martin	464	1.82%
Write-in		285	1.12%
Total votes		25,428	100%

== Ward 6 ==
1997 Council of the District of Columbia Ward 6 special election
- April 29, 1997
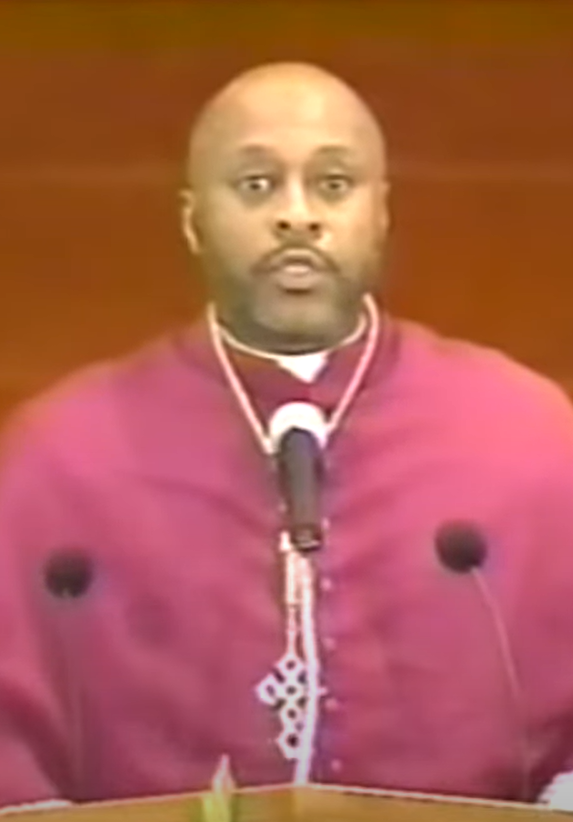

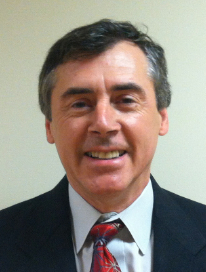

Nominee	Sharon Ambrose	George Augustus Stallings Jr.	Howard Croft
Party	Democratic	Umoja	Democratic
Popular vote	2,888	2,080	1,747
Percentage	25.05%	18.04%	15.15%
Nominee	Sandy McCall	John Capozzi	Rob Robinson
Party	Democratic	Democratic	Democratic
Popular vote	1,641	1,436	764
Percentage	14.23%	12.46%	6.63%
Councilmember before election
Vacant
Elected Councilmember
Sharon Ambrose
Democratic

Incumbent Ward 6 Councilmember Harold Brazil won election to an At-large seat on the Council in the 1996 election, vacating his Ward 6 seat and triggering a special election. 14 candidates filed for the special election with 12 eventually reaching the ballot, as Democrat Sharon Ambrose eventually winning the seat.

=== Candidates ===
- Sharon Ambrose, former Council staffer
- John Capozzi, former District of Columbia Shadow Representative
- Howard Croft, professor at the University of the District of Columbia
- Charles W. Day, retired federal employee
- Anthony Graham Sr., lawyer
- Bernard A. Gray, lawyer and candidate in the 1997 Ward 7 election
- Tom Hamilton, computer engineer and education activist
- Sandy McCall, businessman and anti-crime activist
- Patrick Merkle, lawyer
- Steve Michael, AIDS activist
- Rob Robinson, former Council staffer
- George Augustus Stallings Jr., founder of the African-American Catholic Congregation

Withdrawn

- Ernest Postell Sr., former Advisory Neighborhood Commissioner
- Trista Tramposch, administrator

Endorsements

Sharon Ambrose

Organizations

- District of Columbia Chamber of Commerce

Publications

- The Washington Post
Howard Croft

Organizations

- AFL-CIO Metropolitan Washington Council
Sandy McCall

Organizations

- Metropolitan Police Department Fraternal order of police
Rob Robinson

Organizations

- Greater Washington Board of Trade

=== Special election ===
1997 Council of the District of Columbia Ward 6 special election
Party	Candidate	Votes	%
Democratic	Sharon Ambrose	2,888	25.05%
Umoja	George Augustus Stallings Jr.	2,080	18.04%
Democratic	Howard Croft	1,747	15.15%
Democratic	Sandy McCall	1,641	14.23%
Democratic	John Capozzi	1,436	12.46%
Democratic	Rob Robinson	764	6.63%
Democratic	Sandy McCall	1,641	14.23%
Democratic	Bernard A. Gray	331	2.87%
Republican	Patrick Merkle	304	2.64%
Democratic	Tom Hamilton	117	1.01%
AIDS Cure Party	Steve Michael	78	0.68%
Democratic	Anthony Graham Sr.	59	0.51%
Democratic	Charles W. Day	58	0.50%
Write-in		25	0.22%
Total votes		11,528	100%
