= William Lightfoot =

American politician (born 1950)

Member of the Council of the District of Columbia from the at-large district
- In office January 2, 1989 – January 2, 1997
- Preceded by: Carol Schwartz
- Succeeded by: Carol Schwartz

Personal details
- Born: William Parker Lightfoot; January 3, 1950 (age 76) Philadelphia, Pennsylvania, U.S.
- Party: Democratic (before 1988, 1997–present); Independent (1988–1997)
- Spouse: Cynthiana Lightfoot (m. 1972)
- Children: 2
- Education: Howard University (BA); Washington University (JD)
- Website: Official website

William Parker Lightfoot (born January 3, 1950) is an attorney and politician in Washington, D.C.

== Early years and education ==
Originally from Philadelphia, Lightfoot graduated from Howard University. He earned a juris doctor from the Washington University School of Law in 1978.

== Political career ==
Lightfoot began his political career as a staff member for District of Columbia Council member Wilhelmina Rolark from 1979 to 1981.

=== District of Columbia Cable Design Commission ===
In 1981, a voter referendum was proposed that would allow taxpayers a $1,200 income tax credit for each dependent child attending school. Lightfoot successfully challenged the petitions as being collected by someone who was not a District resident, which made those signatures invalid. Without sufficient valid signatures, the referendum was not on the November ballot.

The Council appointed Lightfoot to chair the District of Columbia Cable Design Commission, a commission to write a request for proposal that would determine how cable television should operate in the District, in 1982. The Council gave the Commission 90 days to write the request for proposal, but the Commission asked for another six months to complete it. Lightfoot was opposed to the additional time, saying it unnecessarily delayed the awarding of a cable franchise. The Commission released the request for proposal in July 1983. The Commission determined that there should be minimum offering of 60 channels for residents and 25 channels for businesses and governmental agencies. The winning franchiser should set aside several of the channels for municipal and community use, provide studios to the public to produce programming, provide grants to support public-benefit television programs, provide service to all eight wards, and complete all work within five years. The Washington Post named Lightfoot one of "Five to Watch in 1984", calling him the "cable czar".

Lightfoot held several public forums to hear from residents about the imminent cable television service. Lightfoot said that residents should be able to participate in the process of bringing cable television to the District and learn how it would increase employment and training. The first forum was held in Ward 7.

After the bidding process was complete, District Cablevision was awarded a contract to provide a 79-channel cable system to residents of the District within four years.

=== Council of the District of Columbia ===
==== 1986 campaign ====
In June 1986, Lightfoot announced he would run as a Democrat for at-large member of the Council of the District of Columbia, essentially challenging Betty Ann Kane's reelection. Lightfoot said that Kane had helped big businesses more than working residents.

The next week, John L. Gibson announced his candidacy for the same seat on the Council. Gibson had been a commissioner of the District of Columbia Board of Parole; a community organizer for the United Planning Organization and the Washington Urban League; and a staff member for the District of Columbia Board of Education, the District of Columbia Office of Personnel, and the Department of Housing and Community Development. Gibson said he was surprised that Lightfoot had decided to run because he was under the impression that Lightfood had said he would support his campaign. Gibson speculated that perhaps someone had mistakenly told Lightfoot that Gibson would not actually run for the office.

Lightfoot dropped out the following month, saying, "By remaining in the race, I would have split votes with Mr. Gibson, who shares my views on the issues. ... In the past, candidates with similar views would split the votes, allowing someone with another view to win. That is a mistake I did not want to repeat." Lightfoot endorsed Gibson's campaign.

Kane won the Democratic primary election with 69 percent of the vote, and she won reelection in the general election, receiving 60 percent of the vote in the general election.

==== 1988 campaign ====
In 1988, Lightfoot ran again for an at-large seat on the Council of the District of Columbia, this time running as an independent.

After leaving the Council, Lightfoot changed his registration to the Democratic Party. Lightfoot's goal was to unseat Republican Carol Schwartz, who was expected to run for reelection. Schwartz later decided not to run for reelection, citing the recent deaths of her husband, mother, mother-in-law, and best friend as factors in her decision.

Other individuals who ran for an at-large seat on the Council included incumbent Democrat John L. Ray; Republican Jerry Moore, former Council member; Independent David Watson, former spokesperson for the District of Columbia Taxicab Commission; Independent R. Calvin Lockridge, D.C. school board member; Statehood Party Tom Chorlton, gay rights activist; Statehood Party David Watson; and Libertarian Dennis Sobin.

Washington Metropolitan Council AFL–CIO and Greater Washington chapter of Americans for Democratic Action endorsed Lightfoot's candidacy.

Lightfoot was elected to the Council with 27 percent of the vote. He was inaugurated on January 2, 1989.

==== First term ====
In the District of Columbia, corporations and partnerships are allowed to donate to political campaigns. A person who owns several entities can have each entity donate separately in order to get around the maximum donation allowed by law. Lightfoot introduced a bill that would eliminate that strategy by including donations by corporations and partnerships in each owner's total maximum donation.

During the Government of the District of Columbia's financial troubles in 1991, Lightfoot proposed increasing the utility tax in order to honor the Council's promise to give $36 million in raises to government employees. The Council unanimously passed the utility tax three months later. Lightfoot turned down two salary increases that members of the Council were given. Lightfoot was one of twelve council members who voted to end the employment of 2,000 mid-level managers because the government did not have the cash to pay them. When an arbitration panel decided that police officers must be given four-percent raises each year for three years, Lightfoot protested, saying the District did not have the cash. Lightfoot was also concerned that it would set precedent to also give raises to other governmental employees, which would require increases to income tax rates.

The District of Columbia Board of Education had full authority of its own budget. Lightfoot proposed an amendment to the Charter of the District of Columbia to give the Council the authority to veto line-items from the education budget.

The District of Columbia Parole Board successfully petitioned the Council to increase its budget in order to hire 22 new parole officers. When the District of Columbia Parole Board decided to use the money to move to larger space rather than hire new parole officers, Lightfoot criticized them, saying, "We're paying money for rent instead of hiring parole officers."

Lightfoot was also critical of a line-item in the District's budget to pay for an outside security firm to guard the Department of Administrative Services when the Bureau of Protective Services could perform the same job.

In May 1991, a police officer shot a Salvadoran man, Daniel Enrique Gomez, and arrested him on a charge of disorderly conduct. The shooting led to the looting, burning, and vandalizing of more than three dozen businesses in Mount Pleasant, Adams Morgan, and Columbia Heights. Lightfoot and Frank Smith introduced a bill to give tax breaks to businesses that had sustained damages.

Lightfoot served on the Council until 1997.

==== 1992 campaign ====
Lightfoot ran for reelection in 1992. Lightfoot was on the general election ballot along with incumbent Democrat John Ray, Republican Philip Baten, D.C. Statehood Sam Jordan, and Independent Brian Moore.

Lightfoot was reelected to the Council with 30 percent of the vote.

==== Second term ====
In 1993, Lightfoot proposed merging the Council of the District of Columbia with the District of Columbia Board of Education, creating a larger, united government entity.

Lightfoot introduced a resolution calling for the Washington Redskins to change its name. The resolution said in part, "'Redskins'...is a discredit to the many men who have played outstanding football for the team. Nicknames and mascots constitute an unauthentic representation of Native Americans, whether used for entertainment, commercial or symbolic purposes. This imagery degrades Native American people and culture and distorts Native American and non-American perceptions of self and community."

Lightfoot filed paperwork to run for mayor as an independent in August 1994. He withdrew from the race a month later.

Along with Council member John Ray, Lightfoot introduced a bill to allow companies other than Bell Atlantic to offer local telephone service to customers in the District. Lightfoot said that competition would decrease customers' prices and while increasing the quality of service.

Lightfoot proposed legislation that prohibited anyone less than 17 years old from being out in public between the hours of from midnight to 6 a.m. on weekends and summers and between 11 p.m. and 6 a.m. on other days. Lightfoot said the legislation would improve the quality of life for children and help identify children who are likely to become victims of crime or may commit crime themselves.

On January 30, 1996, Lightfoot told the Washington Informer, "I probably wouldn't run for re-election this year. I have two small children and I would very much like to teach them various things, being a good father and nurturing them. But I think the key word here is that I probably wouldn't run. But I haven't made up my mind as yet." The following month, Lightfoot decided not to run for reelection.

== Post-council membership (1997–present) ==
Lightfoot currently works as counsel with the law firm Lightfoot Law, PLLC.

Lightfoot was a partner at the personal injury law firm of Koonz, McKenney, Johnson, DePaolis & Lightfoot in Washington, D.C. From 1981 to 2019. He has first began working for the law firm in 1981. During his tenure on the Council, Lightfoot worked part-time at the law firm. After his two terms on the Council ended, Lightfoot returned to full-time work, and he became a partner at the firm.

Lightfoot was a co-chair of Adrian Fenty's transition committee in 2006 and Fenty's inaugural committee in 2007. Lightfoot was also the chair of Fenty's reelection campaign in 2010.

Lightfoot served as the chair of Muriel Bowser's campaigns for mayor of the District of Columbia in 2014 and 2018. After his two terms on the Council ended, Lightfoot returned to full-time work, and he became a partner at the firm.

== Awards and recognition ==
Public Service Awards & Recognition

- Bloomingdale Civic Association- In Appreciation. May 4, 1984.
- The Metropolitan Washington Council AFL-CIO- For contributions and untiring efforts in representing the interests of workers, consumers, the environment, senior citizens, and the unemployed. From the officers & members of the Metropolitan Washington Council AFL-CIO. 12 of March 1988.
- D.C. Department of Public Works- Capital City -By John E. Touchstone, Director. March 1989.
- Center City Community Corporation- Certificate of Appreciation for outstanding and dedicated service. August 26, 1989.
- Organizations for youth and community- plaque of appreciation in recognition of participation in the first annual youth recognition and community service awards day. Donated by Ontario Lakers. September 23, 1989.
- Gap Community Child Care Center(GAP)- For consistent support of GAP's multi cultural program and efforts toward quality education for all children of the District of Columbia. 1990.
- Concerned Citizens on Alcohol and Drug Abuse (CCADA INC.)- Certificate of Appreciation for Outstanding and Dedicated Service. Samuel Foster, Executive Director. July 15, 1990.
- N.W. Boundary Civic Association- Appreciation Award- For outstanding and dedicated service to the Washington, D.C. community. October 28, 1990.
- Little League Baseball - In appreciation of valuable support and acknowledgement of your generosity to Little League Baseball. Presented by Senators Booster Club. 1991.
- Outstanding Community Service- Presented by Commissioner Joan M. Thomas 4D10. October 12, 1991.
- District of Columbia Consumers Utility Board- In Appreciation for distinguished leadership serving the interests of utility consumers. January 21, 1993.
- SS & D Lecture Series- Certificate of Appreciation for outstanding and dedicated service. 1993.
- The Granville Academy, D.C. Chapter- “Keynote Speaker," 1993-1994.
- Kiwanis Club of Shepard Park- For Outstanding Service to Youth. June 11, 1995.
- Fletcher- Johnson Education Center- In appreciation for your outstanding dedication and commitment. Presented by George H. Rutherford, II, PH.D. Principal. June 1995.
- North Michigan Park Civic Association- Community Service Award. October 20, 1995.
- Community Action Inc- Certificate of appreciation- For outstanding and dedicated service to our youth parents and November 30, 1996.
- Court Appointed Special Advocates (Casa) Program of the Superior Court of the District of Columbia. Special Recognition Award. For outstanding support of the DC Casa unit program of the Superior Court of the District of Columbia on behalf of abused, neglected, and abandoned children. Presented by Inez G Wood, President & Anne Radd, Director. Oct 9, 1996.

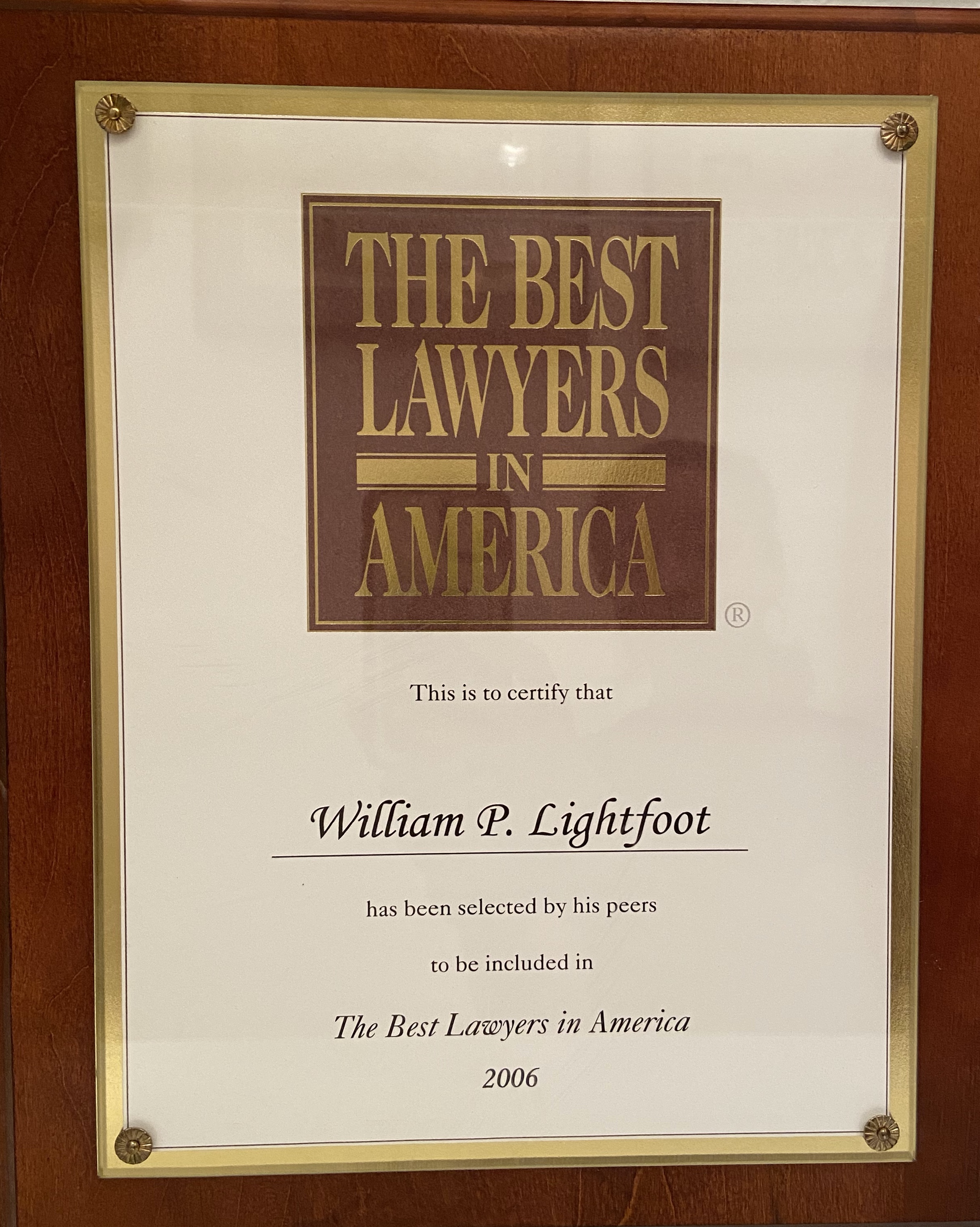
2006 Best Lawyers in America

Legal Awards & Recognition

- Selected to be included in The Best Lawyers in America in 2006.
- Black Enterprise Magazine America's Top Black Lawyer's- October 2003.
- Trial Lawyers Association of Metropolitan Washington, D.C. Trial Lawyer of the Year 2003.
- Washingtonian 50 Best Lawyers.
- The Washington Post- Baltimore & Washington DC's Top Lawyers, 2012.

== Electoral history ==
=== 1988 ===
1988 General Election, Council of the District of Columbia, At-large
Party	Candidate	Votes	%
Democratic	John Ray	117,572	45
Independent	William Lightfoot	71,948	27
Republican	Jerry Moore	29,588	11
DC Statehood	Tom Chorlton	19,446	8
Independent	R. Calvin Lockridge	13,907	6
Independent	R. Rochelle Burns	5,829	2
Libertarian	Dennis Sobin	3,419	1

=== 1992 ===
1992 General Election, Council of the District of Columbia, At-large
Party	Candidate	Votes	%
Democratic	John Ray	149,227	51
Independent	William Bill Lightfoot	87,729	30
DC Statehood	Sam Jordan	27,326	9
Republican	Philip Baten	16,516	6
Independent	Brian Patrick Moore	13,246	4
	write-in	1,211	0
