= 1992 Council of the District of Columbia election =

US Election

- November 3, 1992

6 seats on the Council of the District of Columbia 7 seats needed for a majority
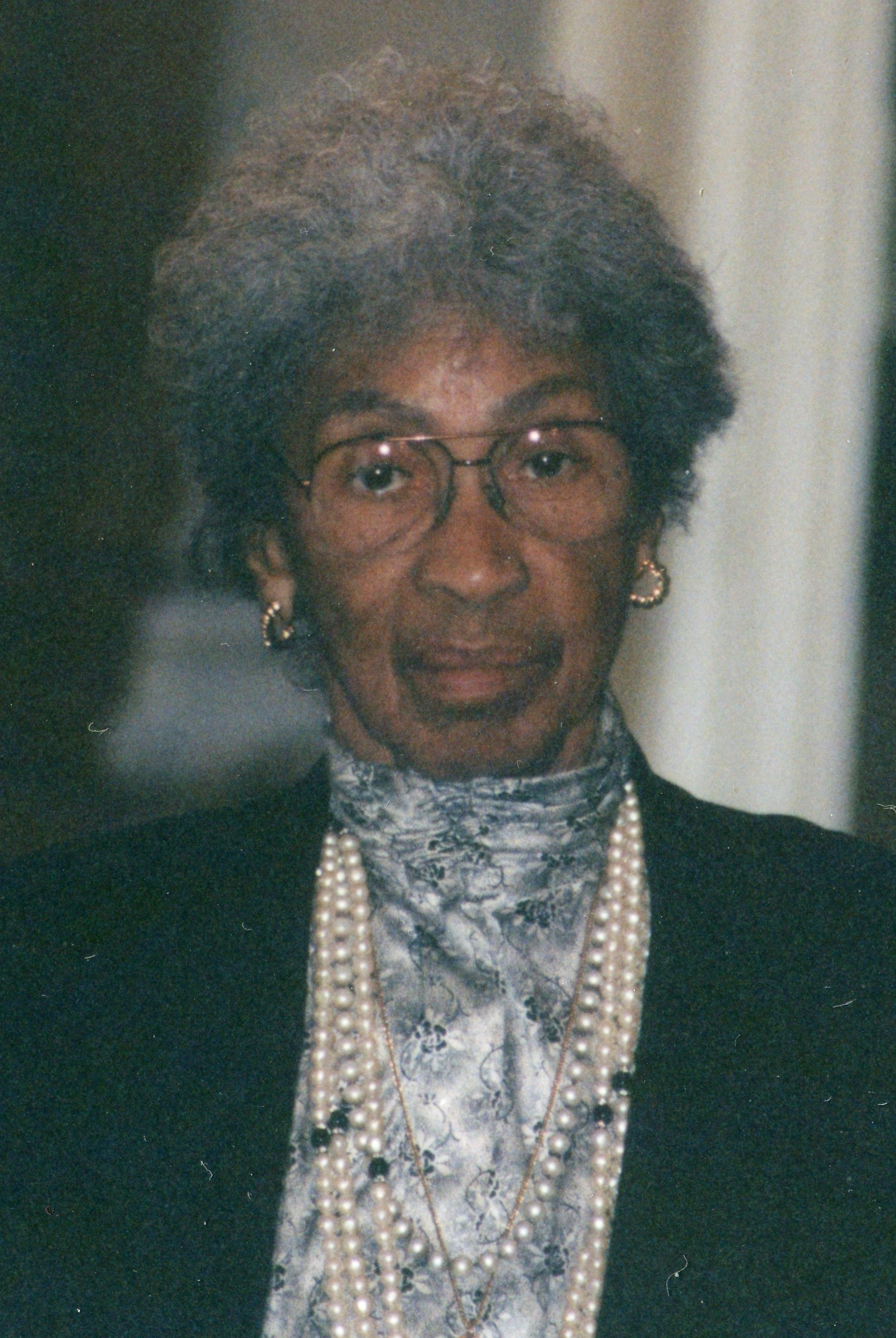

	Majority party	Minority party	Third party
Leader	John A. Wilson	Hilda Mason	William Lightfoot
Party	Democratic	DC Statehood	Independent
Seats before	10	1	1
Seats after	10	1	1
Seat change	Steady	Steady	Steady

The 1992 general election for the Council of the District of Columbia was held on November 3, with primaries taking place on September 15. All incumbents ran for reelection but only four out of the six councilmembers were elected, with the remaining two both losing their party nominations during the primary. Ward 7 councilmember H. R. Crawford was unseated by challenger Kevin P. Chavous by a 4% margin in the Democratic primary. Former mayor Marion Barry returned to politics after his release from prison as the Ward 8 councilmember, beating incumbent Wilhelmina Rolark in the Democratic primary by a 3–1 margin. In Ward 4, Charlene Drew Jarvis kept her nomination in the Democratic primary by only 114 votes, but ended up winning reelection in the general election.

== Summary ==
Democrats remained the largest party on the council, with no seats being lost to other parties or independents. The District was part of the larger anti-incumbent wave seen nationwide in 1992, with multiple incumbents either losing their primary nominations or winning by close margins. However, the dominance of the Democratic party in DC meant that none of the November general elections were particularly competitive.

Position	Incumbent				Certified candidates ▌Democratic ▌Statehood ▌Independent ▌Republican
Position	Member	Party	First elected	Status	Certified candidates ▌Democratic ▌Statehood ▌Independent ▌Republican
At-Large	William Lightfoot	Independent	1988	Incumbent re-elected.	▌ ✓ John Ray 50.5%; ▌ ✓ William Lightfoot 29.7%; ▌ Sam Jordan 9.3%; ▌ Philip Baten 6.3%; ▌ Brian Patrick Moore 4.5%
At-Large	John Ray	Democratic	1979	Incumbent re-elected.	▌ ✓ John Ray 50.5%; ▌ ✓ William Lightfoot 29.7%; ▌ Sam Jordan 9.3%; ▌ Philip Baten 6.3%; ▌ Brian Patrick Moore 4.5%
Ward 2	Jack Evans	Democratic	1991 (special)	Incumbent re-elected.	▌ ✓ Jack Evans 79.0%; ▌ Herbert Coles 13.6%; ▌ Nathaniel T. Adams 6.7%
Ward 4	Charlene Drew Jarvis	Democratic	1979 (special)	Incumbent re-elected.	▌ ✓ Charlene Drew Jarvis 77.0%; ▌ Taalib-Din Abdul Uqdah 17.8%; ▌ Paul V. Brown 3.9%
Ward 7	H. R. Crawford	Democratic	1980	Incumbent lost re-election New member elected. Democratic hold.	▌ ✓ Kevin P. Chavous 95.8%; ▌ Johnnie Scott Rice 3.8%
Ward 8	Wilhelmina Rolark	Democratic	1976	Incumbent lost re-election New member elected. Democratic hold.	▌ ✓ Marion Barry 89.8%; ▌ Richard Miller 5.8%; ▌ W. Cardell Shelton 2.9%

== At-large ==
1992 Council of the District of Columbia At-large election
- November 3, 1992
Nominee	John Ray	William Lightfoot
Party	Democratic	Independent
Popular vote	149,227	87,729
Percentage	50.5%	29.7
Nominee	Sam Jordan	Philip Baten
Party	DC Statehood	Republican
Popular vote	27,326	16,516
Percentage	9.3%	5.6%
Councilmembers before election
John Ray (Dem.)
William Lightfoot (Ind.)
Elected Councilmembers
John Ray (Dem.)
William Lightfoot (Ind.)

Democratic incumbent John Ray and Independent incumbent William Lightfoot were both re-elected to the Council.

=== Democratic primary ===
Candidates

- M Skeeter Douglas Jr.
- Jim Montgomery
- John Ray, incumbent At-large Councilmember

1992 Council of the District of Columbia At-large Democratic primary
Party	Candidate	Votes	%
Democratic	John Ray (inc.)	42,623	75.67%
Democratic	M Skeeter Douglas Jr.	7,690	13.65%
Democratic	Jim Montgomery	4,313	7.66%
Write-in		1701	3.02%
Total votes		56,327	100%

=== Statehood primary ===
Candidates

- Sam Jordan

1992 Council of the District of Columbia At-large Statehood primary
Party	Candidate	Votes	%
DC Statehood	Sam Jordan	197	83.12%
Write-in		40	16.88%
Total votes		237	100%

=== Republican primary ===
No candidates filed for the primary, with Philip Baten winning the nomination through write-in votes.

1992 Council of the District of Columbia At-large Republican primary
Party	Candidate	Votes	%
	Write-in	1,070	100%
Total votes		1,070	100%

=== Independents ===
Candidates

- William Lightfoot
- Brian Patrick Moore

=== General election ===
1992 Council of the District of Columbia At-large election
Party	Candidate	Votes	%
Democratic	John Ray (inc.)	149,227	50.5%
Independent	William Lightfoot (inc.)	87,729	29.7%
DC Statehood	Sam Jordan	27,326	9.3%
Republican	Philip Baten	16,516	5.6%
Independent	Brian Patrick Moore	13,246	4.5%
Write-in		1,211	0.4%
Total votes		295,255	100%

== Ward 2 ==
1992 Council of the District of Columbia Ward 2 election
- November 3, 1992
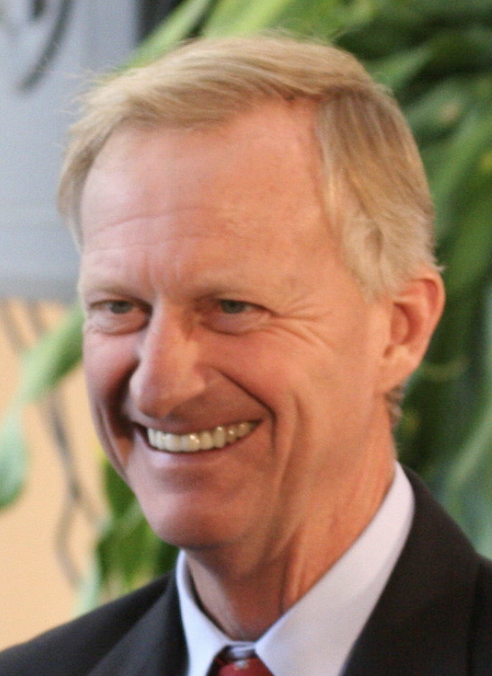

Nominee	Jack Evans	Herbert Coles	Nathaniel T. Adams
Party	Democratic	Republican	Independent
Popular vote	19,068	3,279	1,603
Percentage	79.05%	13.59%	6.65%
Councilmember before election
Jack Evans
Democratic
Elected Councilmember
Jack Evans
Democratic

Incumbent councilmember Jack Evans won re-election to his first full term on the Council after he won the seat during the 1991 special election to replace John Wilson.

=== Democratic primary ===
Candidates

- Jack Evans

1992 Council of the District of Columbia Ward 2 Democratic primary
Party	Candidate	Votes	%
Democratic	Jack Evans (inc.)	3,809	94.80%
Write-in		209	5.20%
Total votes		4,018	100%

=== Republican primary ===
No candidates filed for the primary, with Herbert Coles winning the nomination through write-in votes.

1992 Council of the District of Columbia Ward 2 Republican primary
Party	Candidate	Votes	%
	Write-in	210	100%
Total votes		210	100%

=== Independents ===
Candidates

- Nathaniel T. Adams

=== General Election ===
1992 Council of the District of Columbia Ward 2 election
Party	Candidate	Votes	%
Democratic	Jack Evans (inc.)	19,068	79.05%
Republican	Herbert Coles	3,279	13.59%
Independent	Nathaniel T. Adams	1,603	6.65%
Write-in		171	0.71%
Total votes		24,121	100%

== Ward 4 ==
1992 Council of the District of Columbia Ward 4 election
- November 3, 1992
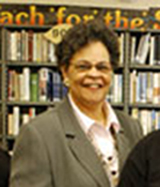

Nominee	Charlene Drew Jarvis	Taalib-Din Abdul Uqdah	Paul V. Brown
Party	Democratic	Independent	Republican
Popular vote	22,720	5,246	1,162
Percentage	76.97%	17.77%	3.94%
Councilmember before election
Charlene Drew Jarvis
Democratic
Elected Councilmember
Charlene Drew Jarvis
Democratic

Incumbent councilmember Charlene Drew Jarvis narrowly won re-election after facing accusations of neglect due to her repeated mayoral campaigns and outside work with national politics as part of the Bill Clinton 1992 presidential campaign. She won her primary by a mere 114 votes, one of the closest primary elections with only two registered candidates in Council history, but independent challenger Taalib-Din Abdul Uqdah was unable to capture the momentum as Jarvis took more than 3/4ths of the vote in the general election.

=== Democratic primary ===
Candidates

- Charlene Drew Jarvis, incumbent Ward 4 Councilmember
- F. Alexis Roberson, former Marion Barry mayoral administration official

Endorsements

Charlene Drew Jarvis

Local officials

- Sharon Pratt, incumbent Mayor of the District of Columbia

Organizations

- Gertrude Stein Democratic Club
- Greater Washington Board of Trade
F. Alexis Roberson

Labor unions

- American Federation of Government Employees district 14

1992 Council of the District of Columbia Ward 4 Democratic primary
Party	Candidate	Votes	%
Democratic	Charlene Drew Jarvis (inc.)	7,316	50.01%
Democratic	F. Alexis Roberson	7,202	49.23%
Write-in		111	0.76%
Total votes		14,629	100%

=== Republican primary ===
No candidates filed for the primary, with Paul V. Brown winning the nomination through write-in votes.

1992 Council of the District of Columbia Ward 4 Republican primary
Party	Candidate	Votes	%
	Write-in	184	100%
Total votes		184	100%

=== Independents ===
Candidates

- Taalib-Din Abdul Uqdah

=== General Election ===
1992 Council of the District of Columbia Ward 4 election
Party	Candidate	Votes	%
Democratic	Charlene Drew Jarvis (inc.)	22,720	76.97%
Independent	Taalib-Din Abdul Uqdah	5,246	17.77%
Republican	Paul V. Brown	1,162	3.94%
Write-in		388	1.31%
Total votes		29,516	100%

== Ward 7 ==
1992 Council of the District of Columbia Ward 7 election
- November 3, 1992
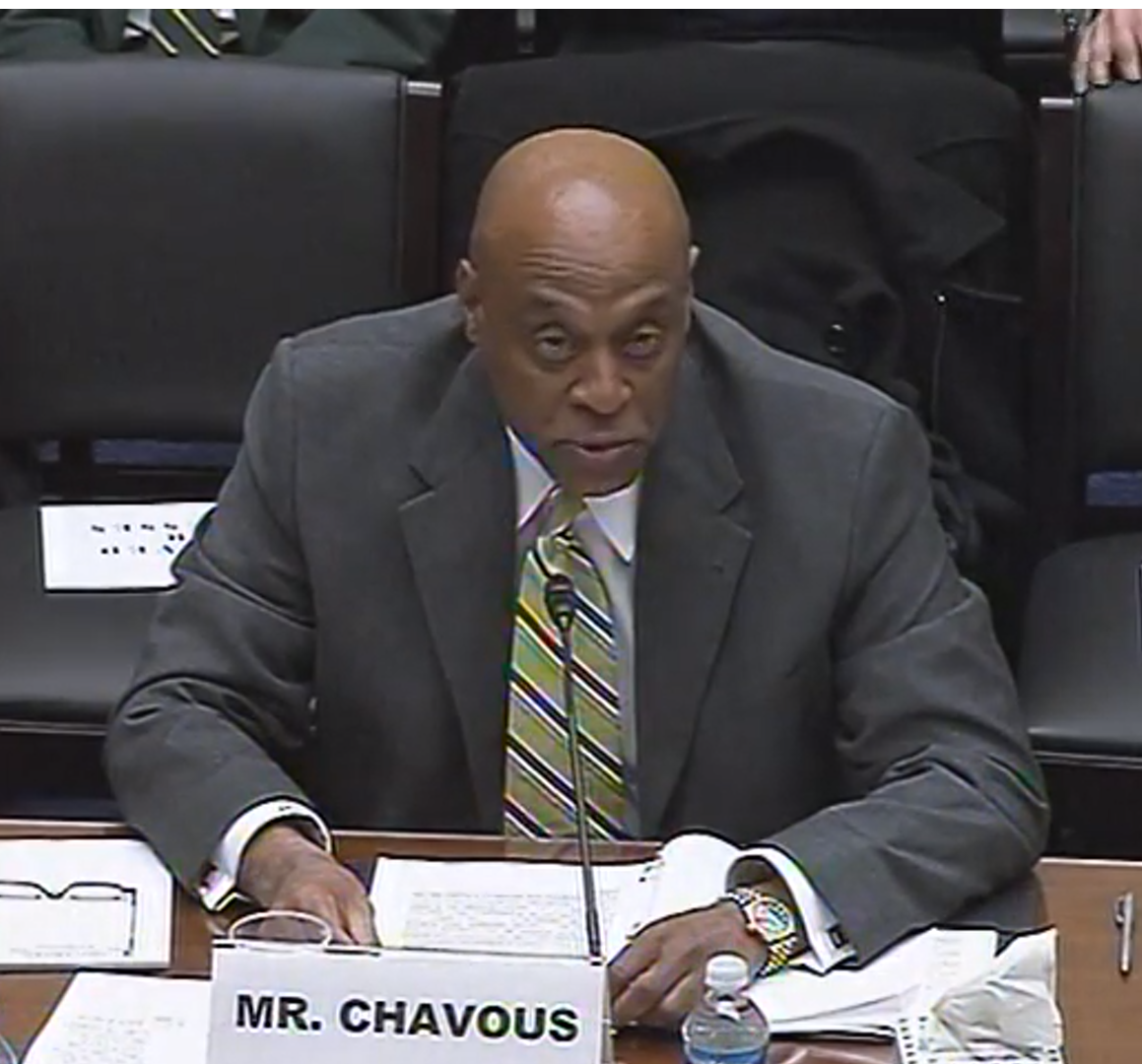

Nominee	Kevin P. Chavous	Johnnie Scott Rice
Party	Democratic	Republican
Popular vote	22,178	868
Percentage	95.80%	3.75%
Councilmember before election
H. R. Crawford
Democratic
Elected Councilmember
Kevin P. Chavous
Democratic

Incumbent councilmember H. R. Crawford lost his primary to Kevin P. Chavous, a lawyer and community organizer who reportedly personally knocked on every door in the ward.

=== Democratic primary ===
Candidates

- Nate Bush
- Kevin P. Chavous
- H. R. Crawford
- Tony Graham Sr.

1992 Council of the District of Columbia Ward 7 Democratic primary
Party	Candidate	Votes	%
Democratic	Kevin P. Chavous	4,923	41.61%
Democratic	H. R. Crawford (inc.)	4,388	37.09%
Democratic	Nate Bush	2,192	18.53%
Democratic	Tony Graham, Sr.	310	2.62%
Write-in		17	0.14%
Total votes		11,830	100%

=== Republican primary ===
Candidates

- Johnnie Scott Rice

1992 Council of the District of Columbia Ward 7 Republican primary
Party	Candidate	Votes	%
Republican	Johnnie Scott Rice	136	76.40%
Write-in		42	23.60%
Total votes		178	100%

=== General Election ===
1992 Council of the District of Columbia Ward 7 election
Party	Candidate	Votes	%
Democratic	Kevin P. Chavous	22,178	95.80%
Republican	Johnnie Scott Rice	868	3.75%
Write-in		104	0.45%
Total votes		23,150	100%

== Ward 8 ==
1992 Council of the District of Columbia Ward 8 election
- November 3, 1992
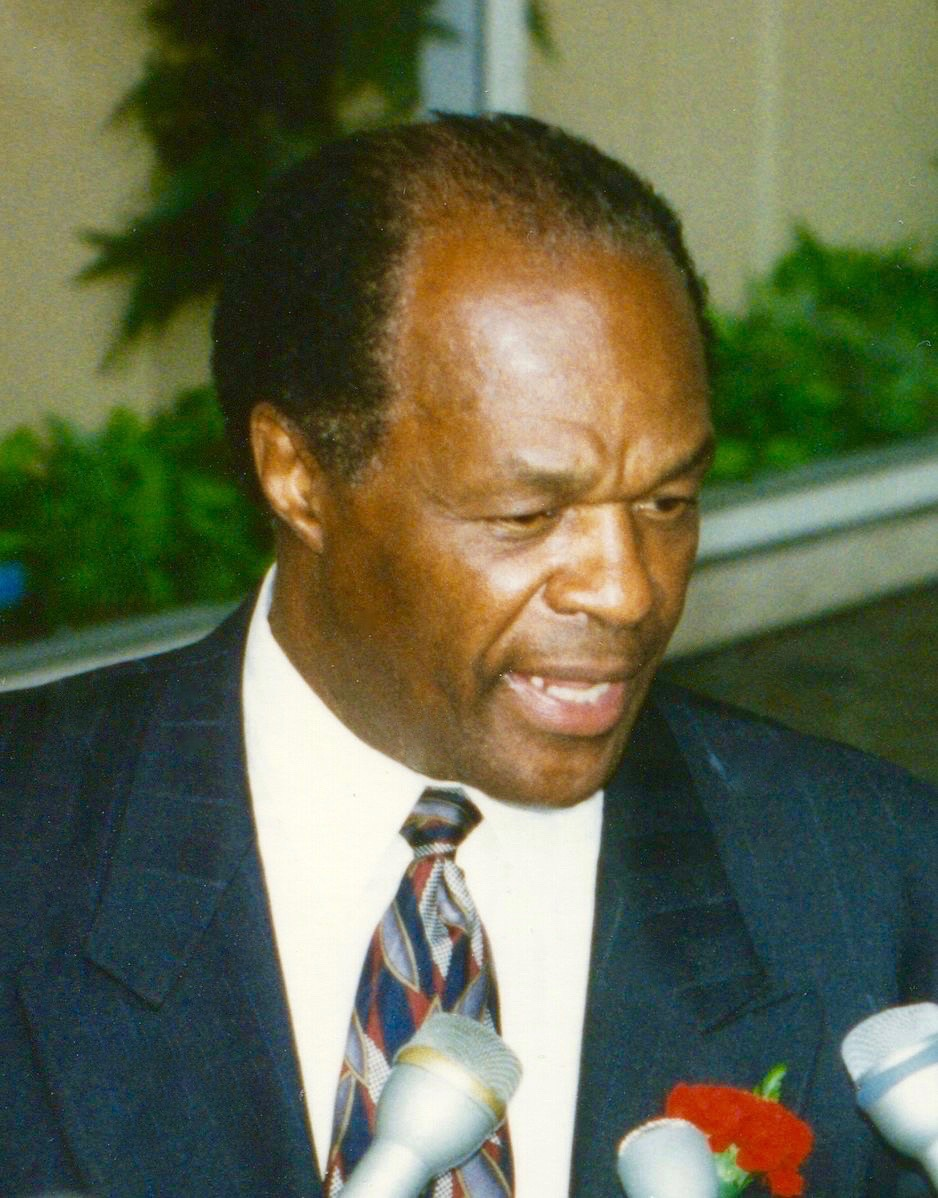

Nominee	Marion Barry	Richard Miller	W. Cardell Shelton
Party	Democratic	Independent	Republican
Popular vote	14,216	914	452
Percentage	89.75%	5.77%	2.85%
Councilmember before election
Wilhelmina Rolark
Democratic
Elected Councilmember
Marion Barry
Democratic

Marion Barry returned to District government after his release from prison, resoundingly beating incumbent Wilhelmina Rolark in the Democratic primary and cleaning up against Independent Richard Miller and Republican W. Cardell Shelton in the general election.

=== Democratic primary ===
Candidates

- Marion Barry
- Charles Chuck Dixon
- Ab Jordan
- Jephunneh Lawrence
- Wilhelmina Rolark

Endorsements

Marion Barry

Labor unions

- American Federation of Government Employees district 14
Wilhelmina Rolark

Labor unions

- AFL-CIO Metropolitan Washington Council

1992 Council of the District of Columbia Ward 8 Democratic primary
Party	Candidate	Votes	%
Democratic	Marion Barry	6,512	69.77%
Democratic	Wilhelmina Rolark (inc.)	1,908	20.44%
Democratic	Ab Jordan	617	6.61%
Democratic	Charles Chuck Dixon	170	1.82%
Write-in		12	0.13%
Total votes		9,333	100%

=== Republican primary ===
Candidates

- W. Cardell Shelton

1992 Council of the District of Columbia Ward 8 Republican primary
Party	Candidate	Votes	%
Republican	W. Cardell Shelton	52	62.65%
Write-in		31	37.35%
Total votes		83	100%

=== Independents ===
Candidates

- Richard Miller

=== General Election ===
1992 Council of the District of Columbia Ward 8 election
Party	Candidate	Votes	%
Democratic	Marion Barry	14,216	89.75%
Independent	Richard Miller	914	5.77%
Republican	W. Cardell Shelton	452	2.85%
Write-in		258	1.63%
Total votes		15,840	100%
