= Jerry A. Moore Jr. =

American politician

Jerry Moore

Member of the Council of the District of Columbia from the at-large district
- In office January 2, 1975 – January 2, 1985
- Preceded by: Position established
- Succeeded by: Carol Schwartz

Member of the District of Columbia City Council
- In office October 2, 1972 – January 2, 1975
- Appointed by: Richard Nixon
- Preceded by: Himself
- Succeeded by: Position abolished
- In office March 13, 1969 – March 18, 1972
- Appointed by: Richard Nixon
- Preceded by: John Nevius
- Succeeded by: Himself

Personal details
- Born: Jerry Alexander Moore Jr. June 12, 1918 Minden, Louisiana, U.S.
- Died: December 19, 2017 (aged 99) Washington, D.C., U.S.
- Party: Republican
- Education: Morehouse College (BA); Howard University (BDiv, MA)

Jerry Alexander Moore Jr. (June 12, 1918 – December 19, 2017) was an African-American Baptist minister and politician in Washington, D.C.

== Early years and education ==
Moore was born in Minden, Louisiana, to Mae Dee Moore and Jerry Alexander Moore Sr. Moore earned his high school diploma in 1936 from the Webster Parish Training School, later Webster High School, which was disbanded in the 1970s because of school desegregation. He graduated from Morehouse College in Atlanta, Georgia with a Bachelor of Arts degree in 1940 and earned a Bachelor of Divinity degree in 1943 from Howard University in Washington, D.C. In 1957, Howard awarded Moore a Master of Arts degree.

== Career ==
Moore served as pastor of the Nineteenth Street Baptist Church from 1946 to 1996.

In 1969, President Richard Nixon appointed him to the District's old appointed council. He resigned in 1972 to run for the D.C. Delegate, but lost the primary to William Chin-Lee. Later that year he was reappointed by Nixon to the seat he'd vacated and remained on the Council until it was replaced by the elected Council in 1975.

In 1974, Moore was elected as a Republican to be an at-large member of the Council of the District of Columbia in the first election after home rule was established; he held that position for ten years. In 1984, he lost the Republican primary to Carol Schwartz and then ran an unsuccessful write-in campaign against her in the general election. He ran again for an at-large seat as a Republican in 1988, but finished in 3rd behind John Ray and William Lightfoot, when only the top two would be seated. In 1989, President Bush nominated Moore to be the United States ambassador to Lesotho.

== Personal ==
Moore was married to Dr. Ettyce Herndon Hill Moore from 1946 until her death in 2014. Educated at both Howard and American Universities, his wife served as a teacher, principal and executive administrator within the District of Columbia Public Schools system. She was also a professor at both Trinity College and Howard University. They had two sons.
