= 1996 United States presidential election in Michigan =

- November 5, 1996

All 18 Michigan votes to the Electoral College
- Turnout: 54.5% ▼

Nominee	Bill Clinton	Bob Dole	Ross Perot
Party	Democratic	Republican	Reform
Home state	Arkansas	Kansas	Texas
Running mate	Al Gore	Jack Kemp	Pat Choate
Electoral vote	18	0	0
Popular vote	1,989,653	1,481,212	336,670
Percentage	51.69%	38.48%	8.75%

Clinton
40–50%
50–60%
60–70%
80–90%
Dole
40–50%
50–60%
60–70%
President before election
Bill Clinton
Democratic
Elected President
Bill Clinton
Democratic

The 1996 United States presidential election in Michigan took place on November 5, 1996. All 50 states and the District of Columbia participated in the 1996 United States presidential election. Voters chose 18 electors to the Electoral College, which selected the president and vice president.

Michigan was won by incumbent United States president Bill Clinton of Arkansas, who was running against Kansas senator Bob Dole. Clinton ran a second time with former Tennessee senator Al Gore as Vice President, and Dole ran with former New York congressman Jack Kemp.

Michigan weighed in for this election as 5% more Democratic than the national average. The presidential election of 1996 was a very multi-partisan election for Michigan, with nearly 10% of the electorate voting for third-party candidates. In typical form for the state, the Upper Peninsula of Michigan voted mainly Democratic, and the Lower Peninsula was divided, but more Republican—with the notable exception of Detroit's highly populated Wayne County, which voted overwhelmingly Democratic. In his second bid for the presidency, Ross Perot led the newly reformed Reform Party to gain over 8% of the votes in Michigan, and to pull in support nationally as the most popular third-party candidate to run for the United States presidency in recent times. This marked the first time since 1968 that the state voted Democratic in consecutive elections.

As of the 2024 presidential election, this is the last election in which Houghton, Alcona, Cheboygan, Crawford, Dickinson, Kalkaska, Luce, Mackinac, Mecosta, Lapeer, Keweenaw, Montcalm, Tuscola, Branch, Baraga, Chippewa, Huron, Wexford, Osceola, Montmorency, and Oscoda Counties voted for a Democratic presidential candidate. This is also the last time all counties in the Upper Peninsula voted for a Democrat.

The year 1996 marked a turning point for Michigan, as it would become the most Democratic-leaning of the three Rust Belt swing states (also consisting of Wisconsin and Pennsylvania), a status it held until 2024. Even though Michigan would vote for Donald Trump in the 2016 U.S. presidential election alongside Wisconsin and Pennsylvania, it was still the most Democratic-leaning of the three states. Michigan was also the most Democratic of the three in 2020.

== Primary election ==
Michigan held presidential primary elections on March 19, 1996.

=== Democratic party ===
The Michigan Democratic caucus was held on March 16, 1996. Incumbent President Bill Clinton won, unopposed.

The Michigan Democratic primary was held on March 19, 1996, as one of the Democratic Party's statewide nomination contests ahead of the 1996 presidential election. Due to the previously held caucus, incumbent President Bill Clinton did not appear on the ballot, which allowed Uncommitted voters to win the primary. The Democratic primary in Michigan did not effect the delegates in the national contest.

==== Results ====
Democratic primary results
Party	Candidate	Votes	%
Democratic	Uncommitted	123,640	86.61%
Democratic	Scattering	19,110	13.39%
Total votes		142,750	100.00%

1996 Michigan Democratic presidential primary
- March 19, 1996

Candidate	Uncommitted	Write-ins
Home state	n/a	Various
Popular vote	123,640	19,110
Percentage	86.61%	13.39%
- County winner Uncommitted

=== Republican party ===
==== Results ====
Republican primary results
Party	Candidate	Votes	%
Republican	Bob Dole	135,946	47.73%
Republican	Pat Buchanan	71,688	25.17%
Republican	Steve Forbes	39,605	13.90%
Republican	Lamar Alexander	21,456	7.53%
Republican	Alan Keyes	5,224	1.83%
Republican	Richard Lugar	4,743	1.67%
Republican	Phil Gramm	673	0.24%
Republican	Bob Dornan	544	0.19%
Republican	Morry Taylor	433	0.15%
Republican	No Preference	3,303	1.16%
Republican	Scattering	1,218	0.43%
Total votes		284,833	100.00%

== General election ==
=== Results ===
1996 United States presidential election in Michigan
Party	Candidate	Votes	%
Democratic	Bill Clinton (inc.)	1,989,653	51.69%
Republican	Bob Dole	1,481,212	38.48%
Reform	Ross Perot	336,670	8.75%
Libertarian	Harry Browne	27,670	0.72%
Natural Law	John Hagelin	4,254	0.11%
Workers World	Monica Moorehead	3,153	0.08%
Independent	Ralph Nader (write-in)	2,322	0.06%
Socialist Equality	Jerome White	1,554	0.04%
Independent	Howard Phillips (write-in)	539	0.01%
Write-ins	Scattering	1,817	0.05%
Total votes		3,848,844	100.00%

==== Results by county ====
County	Bill Clinton Democratic		Bob Dole Republican		Ross Perot Reform		Harry Browne Libertarian		Various candidates Other parties		Margin		Total votes cast
County	#	%	#	%	#	%	#	%	#	%	#	%	Total votes cast
Alcona	2,619	47.15%	2,227	40.09%	669	12.04%	32	0.58%	8	0.14%	392	7.06%	5,555
Alger	2,229	52.68%	1,429	33.77%	537	12.69%	22	0.52%	14	0.33%	800	18.91%	4,231
Allegan	14,361	37.02%	20,859	53.77%	3,269	8.43%	184	0.47%	117	0.30%	-6,498	-16.75%	38,790
Alpena	7,114	52.73%	4,525	33.54%	1,730	12.82%	59	0.44%	64	0.47%	2,589	19.19%	13,492
Antrim	4,226	41.85%	4,630	45.85%	1,129	11.18%	85	0.84%	28	0.28%	-404	-4.00%	10,098
Arenac	3,472	52.68%	2,247	34.09%	844	12.81%	19	0.29%	9	0.14%	1,225	18.59%	6,591
Baraga	1,601	48.60%	1,209	36.70%	460	13.96%	18	0.55%	6	0.18%	392	11.90%	3,294
Barry	9,467	40.95%	11,139	48.18%	2,282	9.87%	147	0.64%	85	0.37%	-1,672	-7.23%	23,120
Bay	27,835	56.12%	16,038	32.33%	5,410	10.91%	141	0.28%	179	0.36%	11,797	23.79%	49,603
Benzie	3,081	45.41%	2,856	42.09%	763	11.25%	59	0.87%	26	0.38%	225	3.32%	6,785
Berrien	24,614	41.51%	28,254	47.65%	5,958	10.05%	254	0.43%	215	0.36%	-3,640	-6.14%	59,295
Branch	6,567	44.36%	6,321	42.70%	1,779	12.02%	94	0.63%	44	0.30%	246	1.66%	14,805
Calhoun	26,287	50.12%	20,953	39.95%	4,765	9.09%	251	0.48%	187	0.36%	5,334	10.17%	52,443
Cass	8,207	45.65%	7,373	41.01%	2,241	12.46%	107	0.60%	52	0.29%	834	4.64%	17,980
Charlevoix	4,689	42.64%	4,864	44.23%	1,303	11.85%	95	0.86%	45	0.41%	-175	-1.59%	10,996
Cheboygan	5,018	46.32%	4,244	39.18%	1,462	13.50%	85	0.78%	24	0.22%	774	7.14%	10,833
Chippewa	6,532	49.26%	5,137	38.74%	1,453	10.96%	81	0.61%	56	0.42%	1,395	10.52%	13,259
Clare	6,311	54.02%	3,742	32.03%	1,531	13.10%	64	0.55%	35	0.30%	2,569	21.99%	11,683
Clinton	11,945	41.76%	13,694	47.88%	2,698	9.43%	174	0.61%	90	0.31%	-1,749	-6.12%	28,601
Crawford	2,666	46.60%	2,157	37.70%	840	14.68%	36	0.63%	22	0.38%	509	8.90%	5,721
Delta	8,561	53.01%	5,925	36.69%	1,543	9.55%	76	0.47%	45	0.28%	2,636	16.32%	16,150
Dickinson	5,614	48.43%	4,408	38.03%	1,478	12.75%	38	0.33%	53	0.46%	1,206	10.40%	11,591
Eaton	19,781	44.29%	20,092	44.98%	4,378	9.80%	254	0.57%	161	0.36%	-311	-0.69%	44,666
Emmet	4,892	38.89%	6,002	47.71%	1,512	12.02%	80	0.64%	94	0.75%	-1,110	-8.82%	12,580
Genesee	106,065	60.94%	49,332	28.34%	17,671	10.15%	633	0.36%	355	0.20%	56,733	32.60%	174,056
Gladwin	5,494	51.38%	3,670	34.32%	1,466	13.71%	38	0.36%	24	0.22%	1,824	17.06%	10,692
Gogebic	4,436	54.19%	2,769	33.83%	917	11.20%	23	0.28%	41	0.50%	1,667	20.36%	8,186
Grand Traverse	12,987	38.97%	16,355	49.07%	3,527	10.58%	279	0.84%	181	0.54%	-3,368	-10.10%	33,329
Gratiot	6,793	45.67%	6,214	41.77%	1,762	11.85%	70	0.47%	36	0.24%	579	3.90%	14,875
Hillsdale	5,955	36.39%	7,947	48.56%	2,262	13.82%	154	0.94%	48	0.29%	-1,992	-12.17%	16,366
Houghton	5,957	43.57%	5,941	43.46%	1,584	11.59%	119	0.87%	70	0.51%	16	0.11%	13,671
Huron	6,827	45.96%	6,126	41.24%	1,811	12.19%	64	0.43%	27	0.18%	701	4.72%	14,855
Ingham	63,584	54.43%	43,096	36.89%	8,640	7.40%	948	0.81%	547	0.47%	20,488	17.54%	116,815
Ionia	9,261	43.17%	9,574	44.63%	2,354	10.97%	198	0.92%	65	0.30%	-313	-1.46%	21,452
Iosco	6,240	50.23%	4,410	35.50%	1,710	13.76%	35	0.28%	29	0.23%	1,830	14.73%	12,424
Iron	3,232	53.34%	2,014	33.24%	755	12.46%	36	0.59%	22	0.36%	1,218	20.10%	6,059
Isabella	9,635	49.81%	7,460	38.57%	2,069	10.70%	117	0.60%	61	0.32%	2,175	11.24%	19,342
Jackson	24,633	43.79%	24,987	44.42%	5,968	10.61%	507	0.90%	161	0.29%	-354	-0.63%	56,256
Kalamazoo	45,644	49.01%	40,703	43.70%	5,867	6.30%	479	0.51%	442	0.47%	4,941	5.31%	93,135
Kalkaska	2,666	43.74%	2,455	40.28%	922	15.13%	41	0.67%	11	0.18%	211	3.46%	6,095
Kent	85,912	38.46%	121,335	54.32%	14,120	6.32%	1,104	0.49%	908	0.41%	-35,423	-15.86%	223,379
Keweenaw	572	46.05%	491	39.53%	169	13.61%	4	0.32%	6	0.48%	81	6.52%	1,242
Lake	2,606	59.31%	1,213	27.61%	552	12.56%	12	0.27%	11	0.25%	1,393	31.70%	4,394
Lapeer	14,308	43.57%	13,369	40.71%	4,793	14.59%	282	0.86%	89	0.27%	939	2.86%	32,841
Leelanau	4,019	39.26%	5,155	50.36%	924	9.03%	90	0.88%	49	0.48%	-1,136	-11.10%	10,237
Lenawee	16,924	47.51%	14,168	39.78%	4,167	11.70%	222	0.62%	138	0.39%	2,756	7.73%	35,619
Livingston	22,517	37.38%	30,598	50.79%	6,337	10.52%	630	1.05%	160	0.27%	-8,081	-13.41%	60,242
Luce	1,107	45.02%	964	39.20%	366	14.88%	18	0.73%	4	0.16%	143	5.82%	2,459
Mackinac	2,700	46.86%	2,281	39.59%	742	12.88%	22	0.38%	17	0.30%	419	7.27%	5,762
Macomb	151,430	49.48%	120,616	39.41%	29,859	9.76%	3,420	1.12%	703	0.23%	30,814	10.07%	306,028
Manistee	5,383	51.08%	3,807	36.12%	1,230	11.67%	80	0.76%	39	0.37%	1,576	14.96%	10,539
Marquette	15,168	56.69%	8,805	32.91%	2,492	9.31%	178	0.67%	115	0.43%	6,363	23.78%	26,758
Mason	5,597	45.69%	5,066	41.35%	1,525	12.45%	30	0.24%	33	0.27%	531	4.34%	12,251
Mecosta	6,370	48.54%	5,289	40.30%	1,373	10.46%	40	0.30%	52	0.40%	1,081	8.24%	13,124
Menominee	4,880	47.92%	4,038	39.65%	1,205	11.83%	40	0.39%	21	0.21%	842	8.27%	10,184
Midland	15,177	42.20%	16,547	46.01%	3,964	11.02%	168	0.47%	111	0.31%	-1,370	-3.81%	35,967
Missaukee	2,256	37.44%	3,012	49.99%	719	11.93%	31	0.51%	7	0.12%	-756	-12.55%	6,025
Monroe	26,072	49.63%	19,678	37.46%	6,315	12.02%	278	0.53%	186	0.35%	6,394	12.17%	52,529
Montcalm	10,053	46.88%	8,679	40.47%	2,530	11.80%	132	0.62%	52	0.24%	1,374	6.41%	21,446
Montmorency	2,120	46.17%	1,760	38.33%	682	14.85%	19	0.41%	11	0.24%	360	7.84%	4,592
Muskegon	35,328	55.69%	21,873	34.48%	5,794	9.13%	277	0.44%	166	0.26%	13,455	21.21%	63,438
Newaygo	7,614	43.14%	7,868	44.58%	2,047	11.60%	69	0.39%	53	0.30%	-254	-1.44%	17,651
Oakland	241,884	47.84%	219,855	43.48%	36,709	7.26%	5,508	1.09%	1,686	0.33%	22,029	4.36%	505,642
Oceana	4,419	45.36%	3,947	40.52%	1,286	13.20%	66	0.68%	24	0.25%	472	4.84%	9,742
Ogemaw	4,725	52.13%	2,904	32.04%	1,369	15.10%	47	0.52%	19	0.21%	1,821	20.09%	9,064
Ontonagon	2,080	48.98%	1,523	35.86%	604	14.22%	19	0.45%	21	0.49%	557	13.12%	4,247
Osceola	4,085	44.94%	3,855	42.41%	1,068	11.75%	70	0.77%	12	0.13%	230	2.53%	9,090
Oscoda	1,652	44.35%	1,545	41.48%	503	13.50%	17	0.46%	8	0.21%	107	2.87%	3,725
Otsego	3,351	40.28%	3,638	43.73%	1,280	15.38%	29	0.35%	22	0.26%	-287	-3.45%	8,320
Ottawa	27,024	28.32%	61,436	64.39%	6,275	6.58%	337	0.35%	344	0.36%	-34,412	-36.07%	95,416
Presque Isle	3,449	50.04%	2,463	35.74%	932	13.52%	35	0.51%	13	0.19%	986	14.30%	6,892
Roscommon	6,092	51.48%	4,135	34.94%	1,539	13.00%	46	0.39%	22	0.19%	1,957	16.54%	11,834
Saginaw	47,579	54.19%	31,577	35.97%	8,081	9.20%	252	0.29%	305	0.35%	16,002	18.22%	87,794
Sanilac	7,092	40.96%	7,821	45.17%	2,265	13.08%	100	0.58%	36	0.21%	-729	-4.21%	17,314
Schoolcraft	2,187	56.50%	1,200	31.00%	460	11.88%	9	0.23%	15	0.39%	987	25.50%	3,871
Shiawassee	14,662	48.27%	11,714	38.56%	3,703	12.19%	211	0.69%	85	0.28%	2,948	9.71%	30,375
St. Clair	28,881	48.04%	22,495	37.42%	8,134	13.53%	445	0.74%	163	0.27%	6,386	10.62%	60,118
St. Joseph	8,529	41.02%	9,764	46.96%	2,319	11.15%	115	0.55%	67	0.32%	-1,235	-5.94%	20,794
Tuscola	10,314	45.55%	9,154	40.43%	3,013	13.31%	136	0.60%	24	0.11%	1,160	5.12%	22,641
Van Buren	13,355	47.74%	11,347	40.56%	2,946	10.53%	229	0.82%	98	0.35%	2,008	7.18%	27,975
Washtenaw	73,106	58.94%	40,097	32.33%	8,020	6.47%	1,277	1.03%	1,528	1.23%	33,009	26.61%	124,028
Wayne	504,466	68.95%	175,886	24.04%	43,554	5.95%	5,301	0.72%	2,390	0.33%	328,580	44.91%	731,597
Wexford	5,510	46.35%	4,866	40.93%	1,386	11.66%	79	0.66%	47	0.40%	644	5.42%	11,888
Totals	1,989,653	51.69%	1,481,212	38.48%	336,670	8.75%	27,670	0.72%	13,639	0.35%	508,441	13.21%	3,848,844

===== Counties that flipped from Democratic to Republican =====
- Charlevoix

===== Counties that flipped from Republican to Democratic =====
- Branch
- Chippewa
- Gratiot
- Huron
- Lapeer
- Macomb
- Mason
- Oakland
- Oceana
- Osceola
- Oscoda
- St. Clair

==== By congressional district ====
Clinton won all but two of the state's 16 congressional districts, including four which were won by Republicans.

District	Clinton	Dole	Perot	Representative
1st	47%	41%	12%	Bart Stupak
2nd	41%	50%	9%	Pete Hoekstra
3rd	39.4%	53.7%	6.9%	Vern Ehlers
4th	47%	41%	12%	Dave Camp
5th	57%	33%	10%	James Barcia
6th	46%	45%	9%	Fred Upton
7th	46%	43%	11%	Nick Smith
8th	49.6%	40.9%	9.5%	Dick Chrysler
8th	49.6%	40.9%	9.5%	Debbie Stabenow
9th	46.2%	43.3%	10.4%	Dale Kildee
10th	49%	40%	11%	David Bonior
11th	47%	46%	7%	Joe Knollenberg
12th	53%	39%	8%	Sander Levin
13th	58.2%	32.8%	7.3%	Lynn Rivers
14th	86%	11%	3%	John Conyers
15th	88%	10%	2%	Barbara-Rose Collins
15th	88%	10%	2%	Carolyn Cheeks Kilpatrick
16th	54%	35%	11%	John Dingell

== See also ==
- Presidency of Bill Clinton
- United States presidential elections in Michigan
