= James Coates (politician) =

American politician (born 1930)

Member of the Council of the District of Columbia for Ward 8
- In office January 2, 1975 – January 2, 1977
- Preceded by: Position established
- Succeeded by: Wilhelmina Rolark

Personal details
- Born: c. 1930 (age 95–96)
- Party: Democratic
- Spouse: Marcia Hall Otey (m. 1987)
- Education: Howard University (BA)

James E. Coates (born c. 1930) is an American Baptist minister and former Democratic politician in Washington, D.C.

== Early years ==
James E. Coates was born to Louise and George E. Coates. He attended Howard University's School of Religion, and he graduated with honors.

== Religious career ==
In 1954, Coates was ordained as a minister and became the pastor of Bethlehem Baptist Church on October 5, 1957. In 2019, the D.C. council passed a resolution commemorating the 65th anniversary of his ordination.

== Political career ==
=== District of Columbia Board of Education ===
==== Nomination in 1967 ====
In 1967, Coates was nominated for one of three open seats on the District of Columbia Board of Education. Coates had served as staff director of the Congress Heights Neighborhood Development Center. Coates supported opening schools year-round. He also supported privatizing the operation of vocational schools. Coates' candidacy was endorsed by Americans for Democratic Action and D.C. Citizens for Better Public Education. At the time, federal district judges appointed the members of the District of Columbia Board of Elections. The federal judges decided to appoint other individuals to the District of Columbia Board of Education.

==== Candidacy in 1968 ====
The first public election for members of the District of Columbia Board of Education was held in 1968. Coates was a candidate to represent Ward 8 on the District of Columbia Board of Education. Coates' nomination was endorsed by the Washington Baptist Ministers Conference. Coates supported more training for teachers and contracting with a private developer to build new schools. Coates' candidacy was endorsed by the Washington Teachers Union, the District Republicans, the Baptist Ministers Conference of Washington, D.C., the D.C. Education Association, and the editorial board of The Washington Post. Coates and Edward E. Saunders both advanced to a run-off election. The D.C. Democrats declined to endorse him. Coates won the run-off election, receiving 1,584 votes to Saunders' 1,187 votes.

==== First term ====
Coates' term in office began on January 26, 1969. The members of the District of Columbia Board of Education elected Coates president.

In February 1969, Coates joined other members of the Board of Education to review school textbooks for examples of racism and outdated content. A high-school textbook described Southerners during the Civil War as "ready to defend the Southern way of life...slavery or no slavery". Another textbook described Ho Chih Minh as the leader of an "independent movement".

=== Council of the District of Columbia ===
Coates was elected as one of the original members of the Council of the District of Columbia in 1974 when D.C. gained home rule. Coates represented Ward 8 on the council from 1975 to 1977.

== Personal life ==
Coates married Marcia Hall Otey in January 1987.
