= Calvin Rolark =

American newspaper publisher and activist

Calvin W. Rolark (1926 or 1927 – October 23, 1994) was an American newspaper publisher and activist. Based in Washington, D.C., Rolark founded The Washington Informer and the United Black Fund.

== Early life and education ==
Calvin W. Rolark, Jr., was born in Texarkana, Texas, circa 1927. He received a bachelor's of business administration from Prairie View College (now called Prairie View A&M University) and also attended Tennessee State University, Michigan State University, and Cornell University. He lived in Memphis, Tennessee, in the 1940s, where he worked as an editor of the Memphis World.

== Career ==
Rolark moved from Texas to Washington in either 1952 or 1959. He founded The Washington Informer, a newspaper, in 1962. In 1969, he founded the United Black Fund, a foundation structured similarly to United Way that supported charitable activities for Black and Latino residents in the Washington, D.C., area. Rolark was also affiliated with the United Planning Organization, a charity.

== Personal life ==
Rolark married Wilhelmina Rolark, a Washington politician, in 1963. According to The Washington Post, Wilhelmina and Calvin were "one of the District's preeminent power couples".

== Sources ==
- Jaffe, Harry S.; Sherwood, Tom (1994). Dream City: Race, Power, and the Decline of Washington, D.C.. Simon & Schuster. ISBN 0-671-76846-8. OCLC 29549204.
