= The Washington Informer =

Newspaper in Washington, D.C.

- Type: Weekly newspaper
- Founder: Calvin W. Rolark
- Publisher: Denise Rolark Barnes
- Editor: Micha Green
- Photo editor: Shevry Lassiter
- Staff writers: Austin R. Cooper, Jr., Brenda Siler, James Wright, Jr., Kayla Benjamin, Sam P.K. Collins, Stacy Brown, Lindiwe Vilakazi, Richard Elliott
- Founded: October 16, 1964; 61 years ago
- Headquarters: Washington, DC
- Circulation: 50,000
- ISSN: 0741-9414
- OCLC number: 60630464
- Website: Washington Informer

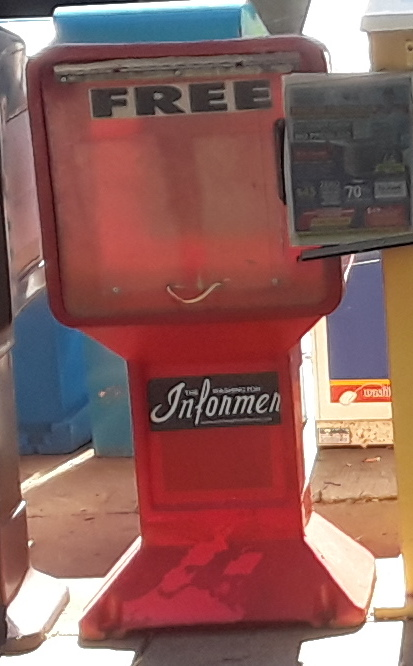
The Washington Informer dispenser at Huntington metro station

The Washington Informer is a weekly newspaper published in Washington, D.C. The Informer is female-owned and is targeted at the African-American population of the D.C. metropolitan area. The publisher is Denise Rolark Barnes, whose father, Calvin W. Rolark (1927–1994), founded the paper in 1964.

At the 2011 Second Annual Ethnic Media Awards competition, the Informer received first-place honors for feature writing and local news.

== Contributors ==
Contributors to the publication include notable writers, political activists and editors such as:

- Rob Redding

== Statistics ==
- Total circulation: 50,000
  - District of Columbia
  - Prince George's County
  - Montgomery County
  - Northern Virginia
- Trade association memberships
  - National Newspaper Publishers Association (NNPA)
  - Newspaper Association of America (NAA)
  - Maryland, Delaware DC Press Association (MDDC)

== See also ==
- Wilhelmina Rolark, former owner of the paper
