= 1996 Democratic Party presidential primaries =

Selection of the Democratic Party nominee

- January 29 to June 4, 1996

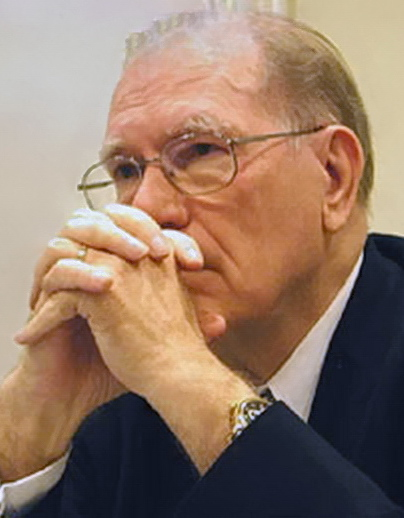
Candidate	Bill Clinton	Uncommitted
Home state	Arkansas	–
Contests won	34	1
Popular vote	9,706,802	411,270
Percentage	89.0%	3.8%
Candidate	Roland Riemers	Lyndon LaRouche
Home state	North Dakota	Virginia
Contests won	1	0
Popular vote	656	596,422
Percentage	0.006%	5.5%
Bill Clinton
Uncommitted
Roland Riemers
No Primary Held
Previous Democratic nominee
Bill Clinton
Democratic nominee
Bill Clinton

From January 29 to June 4, 1996, voters of the Democratic Party chose its nominee for president in the 1996 United States presidential election. Incumbent President Bill Clinton was again selected as the nominee through a series of primary elections and caucuses culminating in the 1996 Democratic National Convention held from August 26 to August 29, 1996, in Chicago, Illinois.

This was the first Democratic presidential primary in 16 years in which an incumbent president was a candidate. Clinton went on to win reelection, thereby becoming the first Democratic president since Franklin D. Roosevelt to win two consecutive presidential elections.

== Primary race overview ==
With the advantage of incumbency, Bill Clinton's path to renomination by the Democratic Party was uneventful. At the 1996 Democratic National Convention, Clinton - along with incumbent Vice President Al Gore - was renominated following a primary race in which he faced only token opposition. Perennial candidate Lyndon LaRouche qualified for one delegate from Virginia and one delegate from Louisiana, but the state parties refused to award him delegates and the First District Court of Appeals upheld their decision. Former Pennsylvania governor Bob Casey contemplated a challenge to Clinton, but health problems forced Casey to abandon a bid. That left Jimmy Griffin, the former mayor of Buffalo, New York, as the highest-ranking challenger still in the race. After finishing in eighth place, behind even the perennial candidates, in the New Hampshire primaries, Griffin dropped out of the race. Clinton easily won primaries nationwide, with margins consistently higher than 80%.

Roland Riemers scored a victory in the North Dakota primary, where Clinton did not file to appear on the ballot.

Backed by a loyal following, LaRouche managed to get on the ballot in most states and amassed over half a million votes nationwide in the primary. His highest percentage was 13.4% in West Virginia and received over a hundred thousand votes in California.

Another notable campaign besides LaRouche's to challenge President Clinton was Chicago housewife Elvena Lloyd-Duffie, who was reported to have outraised him at one point and got as high as 11% of the vote in Oklahoma and 7% in Louisiana.

== Candidates ==
=== Nominee ===
Candidate	Most recent office	Home state	Campaign Withdrawal date	Popular vote	Contests won	Running mate
Bill Clinton	President of the United States (1993–2001)	Arkansas	(Campaign • Positions); Secured nomination: March 26, 1996	9,706,802 (89.0%)	34	Al Gore

=== Withdrew during primaries ===
- Activist Lyndon LaRouche from Virginia
- Former Mayor of Buffalo Jimmy Griffin from New York

=== Declined ===
- Bill Bradley, U.S. senator from New Jersey
- Bob Casey Sr., former governor of Pennsylvania
- Mario Cuomo, former governor of New York
- Dick Gephardt, House minority leader and U.S. representative from Missouri
- Gary Hart, former U.S. senator from Colorado
- Jesse Jackson, 1984 and 1988 candidate
- Bob Kerrey, U.S. senator from Nebraska
- Colin Powell, former chairman of the Joint Chiefs of Staff (Republican)

== Results ==
With a number of non-notable people running against Clinton and LaRouche in several states, The nationwide totals went as follows:

Candidate	Popular vote	Contests won
Bill Clinton	9,706,802 (88.94%)	34
Lyndon H. LaRouche, Jr.	596,422 (5.47%)	
Uncommitted	411,270 (3.77%)	1
Elvena Lloyd-Duffie	92,324 (0.85%)	
Fred Hudson	32,232 (0.30%)	
Heather Anne Harder	29,147 (0.27%)	
Ted Gunderson	15,712 (0.14%)	
Sal Casamassima	9,693 (0.08%)	
Ralph Nader†	6,786 (0.06%)	
Pat Buchanan†	3,362 (0.03%)	
Lamar Alexander†	1,888 (0.02%)	
Pat Paulsen	1,317 (0.01%)	
Steve Forbes†	1,297 (0.01%)	
Bob Dole†	1,257 (0.01%)	
Al Gore†	679 (0.006%)	
Carmen C. Chimento	656 (0.006%)	
Roland Riemers	656 (0.006%)	1
Richard Lugar†	410 (0.004%)	
Vernon Clemenson	383 (0.004%)	
Bruce C. Daniels	312 (0.003%)	
James D. Griffin	307 (0.003%)	
Alan L. Keyes†	281 (0.003%)	
Colin Powell†	280 (0.003%)	
Steve Michael	94 (0.0008%)	
Willie Felix Carter	85 (0.0008%)	
Robert D. Rucker	81 (0.0007%)	
David S. Pauling	74 (0.0007%)	
Vincent S. Hamm	72 (0.0007%)	
Frank Legas	63 (0.0006%)	
Ronald Spangler	62 (0.0006%)	
Michael E. Dass	57 (0.0005%)	
Ben J. Tomeo	47 (0.0004%)	
John Safran	42 (0.0004%)	
Total	10,914,150	36

† Indicates a write-in candidate

== See also ==
- 1996 Republican Party presidential primaries
