= Elvena Lloyd-Duffie =

American politician (born 1932)

Personal details
- Born: June 8, 1932 (age 93) Blytheville, Arkansas
- Occupation: Politician and economist

Elvena E. Lloyd-Duffie (born June 8, 1932) was an American economist and politician and a candidate for the 1996 Democratic Party presidential primaries.

== Biography ==
Elvena Lloyd-Duffie was born June 8, 1932, in Blytheville, Arkansas.

She got her MBA in marketing/management, at John Q. Adams University, in 1963. In 1968 she got her PhD in Madras, India, and in 1973 she got her DD in Theology.

She has had many jobs including being a gate agent in the United Airlines at Chicago O'Hare, a paralegal, an oil dealer, a politician and an accountant.

She married author Jimmie Duffie on May 5, 1977, later separating from him; he was also her running mate in the 1996 United States presidential election.

=== 1996 presidential election ===
Elvena was a candidate in the 1996 Democratic Party presidential primaries, running on a platform that included free unlimited college tuition to anyone who wanted it. She reportedly raised $50.1 million for her presidential bid. She was on the ballot in five states and finished third behind incumbent Bill Clinton and Lyndon LaRouche with a total of 92,324 votes.
