= Steve Michael =

American politician

- Born: April 7, 1956; Longview, Washington, U.S.
- Died: May 25, 1998 (aged 42)

Steve Michael (April 7, 1956 – May 25, 1998) was a member of ACT UP.

== Early and personal life ==
Michael was born in Longview, Washington, where he lived until 1993.

== Political activism ==
Michael became involved with HIV/AIDS activism in 1992, when he pressed Bill Clinton and other presidential campaigns on their plans for and records on HIV/AIDS. The following year, he moved to Washington, D.C. with his partner, Wayne Turner.

In Washington, D.C., Michael founded a chapter of ACT UP. He wrote two city measure proposals, Initiative 57 and Initiative 59, both of which focused on medical marijuana.

In 1996, Michael was the AIDS Cure Party's candidate for President of the United States, with Ann Northrop as his running mate. Their presidential ticket was only on the ballot in Tennessee. He was a critic of the Clinton administration and his stated intention in creating the party and running for office was to "create the illusion of an AIDS voting bloc, and AIDS will become a small part of the media coverage." He had also run in the New Hampshire primaries, receiving a "couple hundred" votes there.

Michael also ran for a Washington, D.C. council seat in Ward 6 in 1997 with his party.

== Death and funeral ==
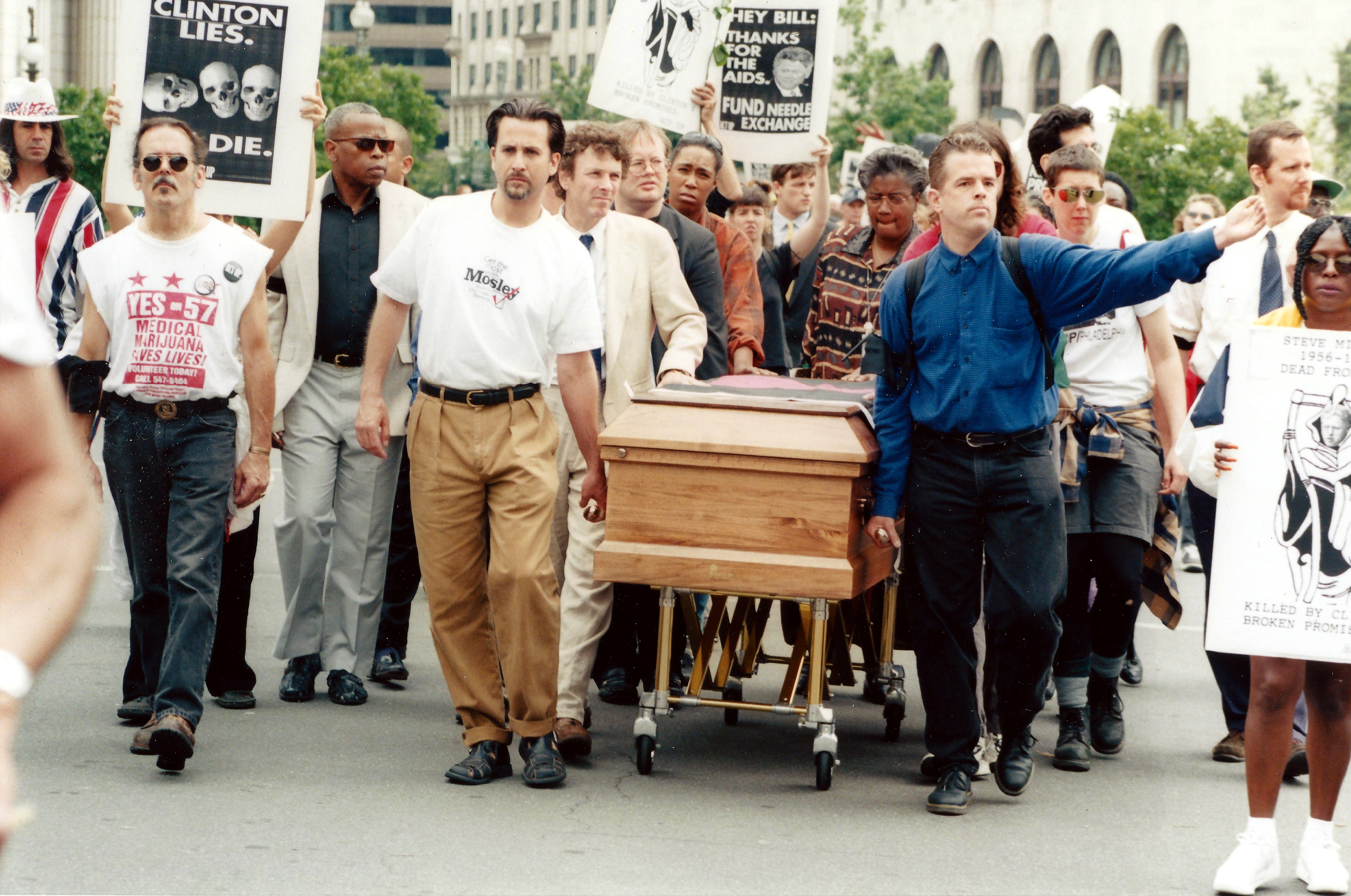
ACT UP political funeral for Steve Michael in front of the White House (June 4, 1998)

Michael died on May 25, 1998, after being removed from life support with the permission of his partner, Wayne Turner.

Prior to his death, Michael had made arrangement with local authorities to allow a protest to occur in front of the White House following his death. A political funeral was held for Michael on June 4. About 100 hundred people, including Michael's mother, Barbara, marched Michael's casket down Pennsylvania Avenue, stopping at Lafayette Park in front of the White House. There, Rev. George Stallings, pastor of the Imani Temple church, resided over Michael's open-casket funeral. Attendees also criticized the Clinton administration's AIDS policies, which they said did not do enough nor had enough funding, with speeches and banners. Following the event, Michael's body was returned to a funeral home, and he was later cremated.
