= Wilhelmina Rolark =

American politician

Member of the Council of the District of Columbia Ward 8
- In office January 2, 1977 – January 2, 1993
- Preceded by: James Coates
- Succeeded by: Marion Barry

Personal details
- Born: Wilhelmina Jackson; September 27, 1916 Portsmouth, Virginia, U.S.
- Died: February 14, 2006 (aged 89) Washington, D.C., U.S.
- Party: Democratic
- Spouse: Calvin Rolark
- Education: Howard University (BA, MA); Terrell Law School (LLB)

Wilhelmina Jackson Rolark (September 12, 1916 – February 14, 2006) was a Democratic politician and activist in Washington, D.C. She was elected to represent Ward 8 on the Council of the District of Columbia in 1976 and served four terms.

Rolark was president of The Washington Informer, a weekly newspaper in Washington, D.C., founded by her husband, Calvin W. Rolark, Sr., in 1964. The paper is now published by her stepdaughter, Denise Rolark Barnes.

== Political career ==
In 1974, after the passage of the District of Columbia Home Rule Act created the Council of the District of Columbia, Rolark ran to be the first Ward 8 member. She lost the Democratic primary to James Coates by fewer than 100 votes and later announced that she would run a write-in campaign against him in the November election. Her campaign was unsuccessful.

Rolark came back in 1976 (the first Ward 8 term after the council's creation was only two years) and defeated Coates in the primary. He in turn launched his own write-in campaign for November, which was also unsuccessful. Rolark became Ward 8 council member on January 2, 1977. She went on to be reelected in 1980, 1984, and 1988.

While on Council, she played a key role in getting Oxon Run Park built. Planning for the park had started in 1975, but the master plan was prepared through the joint efforts of Rolark, and the District's Department of Recreation and Environmental Services. In the fall of 1983, Councilmember Rolark's office organized a series of neighborhood meetings to give Anacostia residents an opportunity to review a preliminary version of the plan and work eventually began in October of 1984.

In 1992, former mayor Marion Barry, recently released from prison, challenged Rolark in the Democratic primary and won in a 3-to-1 landslide. Rolark's time on the council came to an end on January 2, 1993, after 16 years.
