= Office for Civil Rights =

U.S. Department of Education office

Agency overview
- Headquarters: Washington, D.C., US
- Agency executive: Craig Trainor, Acting Assistant Secretary for Civil Rights
- Parent department: U.S. Department of Education
- Key documents: Department of Education Organization Act; 20 U.S.C. § 3413, § 3441
- Website: www.ed.gov/about/ed-offices/ocr

The Office for Civil Rights (OCR) is a sub-agency of the U.S. Department of Education that is primarily focused on enforcing civil rights laws prohibiting schools from engaging in discrimination on the basis of race, color, national origin, sex, disability, age, or membership in patriotic youth organizations. The office lost nearly half its staff in the Trump administration’s layoffs.

== Mission ==
OCR is one of the largest federal civil rights agencies in the United States, with a staff of approximately 560 attorneys, investigators, and other staff. The agency can be found in twelve regional offices and in its Washington, D.C. headquarters. The Office for Civil Rights is responsible for ensuring compliance by schools that are public entities or recipients of federal education funds with several federal civil rights laws, including:

- Title VI of the Civil Rights Act of 1964 (in 34 CFR 100, 101),
- Title IX of the Education Amendments Act of 1972 (in 34 C.F.R. 106),
- Title II of the Americans with Disabilities Act (in 28 CFR 35),
- Section 504 of the Rehabilitation Act of 1973 (in 34 C.F.R. 104, 105),
- the Boy Scouts of America Equal Access Act (in 34 C.F.R. 108), and
- the Age Discrimination Act of 1975 (in 34 C.F.R. 110).

In the case of school bullying school districts may violate these civil rights statutes and the Department of Education's implementing regulations when peer harassment based on race, color, national origin, sex, or disability is sufficiently serious that it creates a hostile environment and such harassment is encouraged, tolerated, not adequately addressed, or ignored by school employees. Under these federal civil rights laws and regulations, students are protected from harassment by school employees, other students, and third parties.

Title VI of the Civil Rights Act of 1964 prohibits discrimination based on race, ethnicity, and national origin at federally funded post-secondary educational institutions. Although religion is not a protected characteristic in Title VI, there are cases of religious discrimination that also involve racial or ethnic discrimination. The “Marcus Doctrine,” named for Kenneth L. Marcus who served as Assistant U.S. Secretary of Education for Civil Rights in two U.S. administrations and established in a 2004 Dear Colleague Letter, established that federal civil rights law protects members of other faiths when they are targeted due to their ancestry or ethnicity. In September, 2023, the Biden administration announced that eight additional executive agencies adopted the Marcus Doctrine, in addition the U.S. Departments of Education, State and Justice, which had already been applying the policy.

== Leadership ==
The United States Assistant Secretary of Education for Civil Rights is the head of the OCR. The Assistant Secretary is also the primary civil rights adviser to the United States Secretary of Education.

Former Assistant Secretaries were:

- Cynthia G. Brown (1980)
- Clarence Thomas (1981–1982)
- Harry M. Singleton (1982–1985)
- LeGree S. Daniels (1987–1989)
- Michael L. Williams (1990–1993)
- Norma V. Cantu (1993–2001)
- Gerald A. Reynolds (2002–2003)
- Stephanie J. Monroe (2005–2008)
- Russlynn Ali (2009–2012),
- Catherine E. Lhamon (August 2013–January 2017)..
- Kenneth L. Marcus (August 2018–July 2020)
- Kimberly Richey (Acting) (August 2020-November 2021)
- Catherine E. Lhamon (November 2021-January 2025)
- Craig Trainor (2025, acting)

== Guidance to educational institutions ==
The OCR issues "technical guidance" instructing K-12 schools and higher education institutions on how to comply with civil rights laws under its mandates. In 2001, the OCR interpreted Title IX obligations to include the prevention and punishment of on-campus sexual harassment. The Obama administration's OCR has been active in issuing such guidance, including:

- Eight Dear Colleague letters focused solely Title VI issues, covering topics such as voluntary consideration of race to avoid racial isolation in schools; avoiding immigration/citizenship status discrimination in the enrollment process; school discipline; and school obligations to ensure meaningful participation of English Learner students. Many of these letters have been controversial. For example, the school discipline letter has been criticized by Professor Gail Heriot (who sits on the U.S. Commission on Civil Rights) and Alison Somin as both bad policy and beyond the scope of the powers of the Office for Civil Rights.
- Seven Dear Colleague letters exclusively addressing a variety of Title IX topics such as sexual violence, pregnant and parenting students, the obligations of Title IX Coordinators, volunteer youth service organizations, compliance with Title IX's regulatory requirement to accommodate students’ athletic interests and abilities, and Title IX protections for transgender students.
  - "Dear Colleague" Letter: Guidance on Addressing Sexual Harassment/Sexual Violence, issued April 4, 2011
  - Questions and Answers on Title IX and Single-Sex Elementary and Secondary Classes and Extracurricular Activities
  - Questions and Answers on Title IX and Sexual Violence, issued April 29, 2014.
  - Dear Colleague Letter on Transgender Students, issued jointly on May 13, 2016 with the Department of Justice, stating that both agencies regard Title IX's prohibition on sex discrimination to prohibit discrimination on the basis of a student's gender identity
- Five Dear Colleague letters focused primarily on Section 504 and ADA issues. These letters dealt with addressing the need for educational technology to be accessible; effective communication for students with hearing, vision, or speech disabilities; FAQs regarding the Americans with Disabilities Act Amendments Act of 2008 and the broadened definition of "disability;" access to extracurricular activities and sports; and disability-based bullying and harassment.

== Civil Rights Data Collection ==
The Civil Rights Data Collection (CRDC) is a biennial data collection from all public schools in the country conducted by the OCR. The collection began in 1968 to collect data on leading civil rights indicators related to access and barriers to educational opportunity at the early childhood through grade 12 levels. The collection was formerly known as the Elementary and Secondary School Survey. The data collected is used by the OCR, Department of Education, education researchers, policymakers and scholars from many fields.

== Sexual violence investigations ==
On May 1, 2014, the Office for Civil Rights released a list of higher education institutions with open Title IX sexual violence investigations. As of 16 March 2015, nearly 100 colleges and universities were under investigation.

This list constitutes the first time the federal government has announced ongoing sexual violence investigations; previously investigations were known only to members of university and college communities. When announcing the schools under investigation, Assistant Secretary for Civil Rights Catherine E. Lhamon suggested that "increased transparency will spur community dialogue about this important issue... and foster better public awareness of civil rights."

The decision to release the names of universities and colleges under investigation was due to pressure from both the White House Task Force to Protect Students from Sexual Assault and the New Campus Anti-Rape Movement. Importantly, Lhamon continued, "a college or university's appearance on this list and being the subject of a Title IX investigation in no way indicates at this stage that the college or university is violating or has violated the law."

There are critics of the list on both sides of campus anti-rape politics. Andrea Pino, a complainant against UNC-Chapel Hill and co-founder of End Rape on Campus, told the Huffington Post that "announcing an investigation can open survivors to retaliation, and it's important that the OCR also take emphasis on providing survivors an option to opt out of having their investigation announced if it could endanger them, especially in small institutions where anonymity is less of an option." Organizations like FIRE have argued that the OCR list—along with its precursor the Dear colleague letter—violates the rights to due process for both institutions and individuals.

On July 2, 2014, the Office for Civil Rights added 12 colleges and universities to its list, on July 10, 2014 one more was added, and four more were named on July 30, 2014.

=== Concluded investigations ===
In November 2014, the Office for Civil Rights announced that it had found Princeton University in violation of Title IX. The Office and Princeton reached an agreement on a package of procedural reforms to bring it into compliance including mandatory training, a public awareness and bystander intervention campaign, reexamination of three years of past sexual violence complaints, improved coordination with law enforcement, and expanded documentation of sexual violence on campus.

== Shared Ancestry investigations ==
Title VI of the Civil Rights Act of 1964 protects against discrimination based on shared ancestry. This includes both antisemitism and Islamophobia. College students and K-12 parents have filed complaints against their schools for being discriminated against based on shared ancestry.

Since October 2023, the Education Department has launched 31 new investigations into these complaints . In November 2023, it released a new list of K-12 schools and colleges under investigation for incidents of antisemitism and Islamophobia, including Lafayette College, Cornell University, Columbia University, Wellesley College, University of Pennsylvania, and The Cooper Union for the Advancement of Science and Art and Kansas’ Maize Unified School District. Five of the complaints reported instances of antisemitism harassment and two report anti-Muslim harassment. “When students are targeted because they are — or are perceived to be — Jewish, Muslim, Arab, Sikh or any other ethnicity or shared ancestry, schools must act to ensure safe and inclusive educational environments where everyone is free to learn,” Education Secretary Miguel Cardona said in a statement.

In May 2024, OCR opened an investigation into Emory University’s alleged discrimination against students with Palestinian, Muslim, or Arab ancestry. An 18-page complaint was filed on April 5 by students from the university in Atlanta and Georgia under title VI of the Civil Rights Act and is one of at least six Title VI claims made regarding prejudicial treatment of Palestinian, Muslim, and Arab students on campuses. Other schools with complaints include Columbia, Rutgers, University of Massachusetts-Amherst, and the University of North Carolina-Chapel Hill.

In response to increases in discrimination complaints, on May 7, 2024, the Office of Civil Rights issued a Dear Colleague Letter: Protecting Students from Discrimination, such as Harassment, Based on Race, Color, or National Origin, Including Shared Ancestry or Ethnic Characteristics. The Dear College Letter (DCL) doesn't hold the weight of law but offers valuable direction. The DCL highlights protections under Title VI extend to characteristics of shared ancestry, ethnicity, and nationality, such as Islam, Judaism, Hinduism, Sikhism, Arab, Israeli, Palestinian, or South Asian. Thus, educational facilities receiving federal financial assistance must comply with Title VI.

=== Concluded investigations ===
On November 16, 2020, The University of Illinois, Jewish United Fund Chicago, Illini Hillel, Hillel International, Illini Chabad, Arnold & Porter, and the Louis D. Brandeis Center for Human Rights Under Law announced a resolution agreement in response to a Title VI civil rights complaint filed against the university. On April 4, 2023, OCR announced a Resolution Letter and Agreement mandating that the University of Vermont (UVM) implement changes due to its inadequate response to numerous complaints regarding harassment and discrimination on campus. UVM agreed to enhance its policies and procedures to reaffirm its dedication to combating prejudice and will be subject to increased federal supervision. No resolution agreements have been announced from the surge of new investigations launched after October 2023.
