= Norma Cantu =

Norma Cantu or Norma Cantú may refer to:

- Norma Elia Cantú (born 1947), Chicana postmodernist writer and professor
- Norma V. Cantu (born 1954), American civil rights lawyer and educator
