= Glenn Magpantay =

LGBTQ activist and lawyer

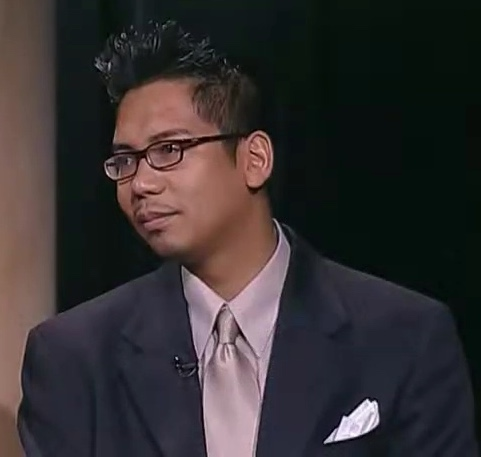
- Magpantay in 2001

Member of the United States Commission on Civil Rights
- Incumbent
- Assumed office February 15, 2023
- Appointed by: Chuck Schumer
- Preceded by: David Kladney

Personal details
- Born: Glenn Duque Magpantay; 1969 (age 56–57)
- Party: Democratic
- Education: State University of New York, Stony Brook (BA); New England School of Law (JD)
- Website: Official website

Glenn Duque Magpantay (born 1969) is the former executive director of the National Queer Asian Pacific Islander Alliance, an instructor at Brooklyn Law School and Hunter College/CUNY, and a former civil rights attorney in the role of Democracy Program director for the Asian American Legal Defense and Education Fund. In 2023, Glenn D. Magpantay was appointed as a commissioner to the United States Commission on Civil Rights by Senate Majority Leader Chuck Schumer. He is chair of the LGBTQ Committee of the Asian American Bar Association of New York, former co-chair of the Gay Asian & Pacific Islander Men of New York, and recognized as an "authority on the federal Voting Rights Act and expert on Asian American political participation, including bilingual ballots, election reform, minority voter discrimination, multilingual exit polling, and census." He has served as a commissioner on the New York City Voter Assistance Commission. He is also a contributing writer for the Huffington Post. The Glenn Magpantay Leadership Award at his undergraduate alma mater, the State University of New York at Stony Brook, is named after him.

== Early life and education ==
Magpantay was born to Dr. Rudolfo I. Magpantay and Dr. Esmeralda Duque-Magpantay. Magpantay earned his bachelor's in Sociology & Social Sciences at the State University of New York at Stony Brook. He earned his Juris Doctor from New England School of Law, graduating cum laude.

== Career ==
In 1991, Magpantay worked for Midwest Academy and US Student Association as a GROW grassroots organizing trainer. He transitioned to the role of community organizer at the Long Island Progressive Coalition in 1993, where he also ran its Political Action Committee (PAC). He next served as executive director at the University of California Student Association, then as an immigration law clerk at Catholic Charities Legal Services, Inc. In 1994, Magpantay spoke at the National March on Washington for Lesbian, Gay, and Bi Equal Rights and Liberation. The same year, he was named one of "25 Leading Men of 2004" by Instinct.

In 2000, he organized the first-ever testimony before the White House Initiative on Asian Americans & Pacific Islanders. In 2005, the Asian American Lawyers Association of Massachusetts bestowed him with their Community Service Award for his work on voting rights in Boston. Starting in 2006, he spent two years at the Asian American Bar Association of New York in the role of Continuing Legal Education Instructor. He then spent 17 years as a civil right attorney and Democracy Program Director at the Asian American Legal Defense & Education Fund. Overlapping with his tenure, he began as an Adjunct Associate Professor of Law at Brooklyn Law School in 2007. The same year, he was a featured speaker at CUNY's Conference on Caribbean Asians. In 2009, he began teaching at Hunter College as an adjunct Professor of Law & Asian American Studies where he teaches "Asian American Civil Rights & the Law", "Introduction to Asian American Studies" (aka Asians in the United States), and "Asian American Queerness: An Overview of LGBTQ Asian American / South Asian Issues".

Magpantay joined the National Queer Asian Pacific Islander Alliance as executive director in 2015. He previously served as a co-director for the organization. Also in 2015, the New York State Bar Association Committee on Civil Rights honored Magpantay with the Haywood Burns Memorial Award.

In 2016, Magpantay was bestowed with the Gay City News Impact Award.

In 2017, Magpantay began teaching "Asian American Civil Rights and the Law" and "Intro to Asian American Studies" at Columbia University, maintaining his posts at Brooklyn Law School and Hunter. The same year, he was bestowed with an Arcus Leadership Fellowship. The same year, he was a presenter at the Out & Equal Workplace Summit.

In 2019, Magpantay led LGBTQ-inclusion training of faculty and staff at the University of Tsukuba in Japan. He also lobbied the United States House of Representatives for LGBTQ immigrants rights, meeting with 15 congressional offices to support the Reuniting Families Act. In August 2019, Magpantay appeared as a workshop leader and panelist at the National Queer Asian Pacific Islander Alliance National Summit Training in Las Vegas, Nevada.

In 2020, Magpantay was a guest speaker alongside the National LGBTQ Task Force's Policy Director, Meghan Maury, for Census Counts's webinar "Engaging AANHPI LGBTQ Communities." He also led the workshop "The Census and LGBTQ Asians, South Asians, Southeast Asians, and Pacific Islanders: What’s at Stake, and How to Keep Safe" in Texas, Washington D.C., and New York.

He is the principal of Magpantay & Associates, a nonprofit consulting and legal services firm. Crain's NY Business hailed him as a Notable LGBTQ Executive in 2021.

He is known for filing a demand that the FBI open a federal investigation and the U.S. Department of Justice commence a federal prosecution of a white man responsible for the death of Jaxon Sales—a 20-year-old gay Korean/Filipino young man who was found naked and dead in a San Francisco apartment in March 2020, pursuant to the Matthew Shepard and James Byrd Jr., Hate Crimes Prevention Act of 2009, 18 U.S.C. § 249.

In 2021, Magpantay, was awarded a prestigious "George Soros Equality Fellow" from the Open Society Foundations where he is documenting the history of the LGBTQ Asian American community over the past 25 years.

In February 2023, the United States Senate (majority) appointed him to the United States Commission on Civil Rights. Senate Majority Leader Chuck Schumer announced his appointment as a Commission in the congressional record on February 13, 2023. At the commission, Magpantay investigates the enforcement of civil rights and advises Congress and the president on civil rights policy

Magpantay will be the first commissioner of Filipino heritage since the commission was created in 1957, and the first openly gay Asian American commissioner since the Eisenhower Administration. His appointment was also supported by Congresswoman Grace Meng.

Magpantay helped create the commission's statutory enforcement report on the Federal Response to Antiracism in the United States (2023). The report covered anti-Asian hate crimes since the onset of the COVID-19.

He ensured that the commission's report to Congress and the White House on violent crime highlighted the killing of transgender women of color.

Magpantay requested that the U.S. Department of Justice appoint federal observers to monitor poll sites in five states – Texas, Pennsylvania, North Carolina, Georgia, and Massachusetts – for compliance with the federal Voting Rights Act and to guard against minority voter disenfranchisement and intimidation. Soon thereafter Attorney General Merrick Garland announced that the department would be sending federal observers to 86 cities in 27 states for the November 5th general election.

== Community service ==
Magpantay has held a number of community service roles throughout the years. From 1992 to 1993, he was a board member for the NYC chapter of Citizen Action of New York, a grassroots organization dedicated to social, racial, economic, and environmental justice. Then in 1993, Magpantay joined the American Friends Service Committee, a Quaker organization working towards peace and social justice in the US and abroad. He would serve with them as a Peace Building Committee member for 8 years. Within that time, from 1996 to 1998, Magpantay also acted as an executive committee member for the Massachusetts chapter of the National Lawyers Guild, a longstanding progressive public interest legal association.

Following these roles, from 1991 to 2001 Magpantay served as a trustee for the Boehm Foundation, a philanthropic organization that provided grant funding to organizations for democratic development and civil rights. After that, from 2001 to 2005 Magpantay acted as a co-chair for Gay Asian and Pacific Islander Men of New York (GAPIMNY), an enduring all-volunteer community organization dedicated to Queer and Trans Asian Pacific Islanders. Within that time, in 2002 he was also appointed by the New York City Council to the NYC Voter Assistance Commission to support efforts to ensure accessible, accurate, and secure elections.

From 2005 onward, Magpantay served as a chair for the Pro Bono Committee of the Asian American Bar Association of New York until 2011, then from 2013 to the present day as a chair for the LGBTQ committee. Within that time, in 2015 he also became a Diversity and Inclusion Committee member for the National Asian Pacific Bar Association, which he continues in the present. Most recently, in 2020 Magpantay began service as a NY Advisory committee member for the United States Commission on Civil Rights, established by the 1957 Civil Rights Act as an independent, bipartisan federal effort to develop civil rights policy and enforce of civil rights laws.

== Scholarly works ==
=== As author ===
- Building a Queer Asian Movement: Building Communities and Organizing for Change chapter in "Q & A: Voices from Queer Asian North America" (2021)
- A Shield Becomes a Sword: Defining and Deploying a Constitutional Theory for Communities of Interest in Political Redistricting (2020)
- TIGER: A Sustainable Model for Building LGBTQ AAPI Community (2020)
- The Ambivalence of Queer Asian Pacific Americans Toward Same-Sex Marriage (2019 via 2006)
- The Future of the LGBTQ: Asian American and Pacific Islander Community in 2040 (2016)
- Sound Barriers Ver. 2.0: The Second Generation Enforcement of the Language Assistance Provisions (Section 203) of the Voting Rights Act (2015)
- Asian American Voters in "Minority Voting in the United States" (2015)
- Associational Rights and Standing: Does Citizens United Require Constitutional Symmetry Between The First Amendment and Article III? (2012)
- So Much Huff and Puff: Whether Independent Redistricting Commissions Are Inconsequential for Communities of Color (2011)
- Barriers to Voting and Asian Americans, essay in "The Battle Over Bilingual Ballots" (2009).
- Asian American Political Participation in the 2008 Presidential Election (2008)
- Two Steps Forward, One Step Back, and a Side Step: Asian Americans and the Federal Help America Vote Act (2005)
- Ensuring Asian Access to Democracy in New York City (2004)
- Asian American Access to the Vote: The Language Assistance Provisions of the Voting Rights Act and Beyond (2004)
- Asian American Voting Rights and Representation: A Perspective from the Northeast (2001)
- Redistricting and the Gay, Lesbian, Bisexual, and Transgender Community: A Strategy Memo (2001)
- Intersections of Civil Traditional Rights and Gay Rights Law and Litigation (2000)

=== As co-author ===
- The Supreme Court's Upcoming Decision in the DACA Cases Could Place LGBTQ Recipients at Serious Risk, NYU Review of Law & Social Change's The Harbinger, Volume 44.
- Reauthorization of the Voting Rights Act and Asian Americans (2006)
- Asian Americans and Reauthorization of Voting Rights Act (2005)

== Selected Court briefs ==
LGBTQ Immigrant's Rights

- D.H.S. v. Regents of the University of California (U.S. Supreme Court, 2019) to successfully block Donald Trump's attempt to cancel DACA, representing openly LGBTQ Korean, South Asian, and Pacific Islander Dreamers, with co-counsel Mintz, Levin, Cohn, Ferris, Glovsky and Popeo.
- U.S. v. California (U.S. Court of Appeals for the Ninth Circuit, 2018) challenging the Trump Administration's lawsuit against California's sanctuary laws, with co-counsel Weil Gotshal & Manges.
- Hawaii v. Trump (U.S. Supreme Court, 2018) challenging Trump's anti-Muslim travel ban because of its harm on LGBTQ Muslims, with Immigration Equality and the NYC Anti-Violence Project, with co-counsel Skadden, Arps, Slate, Meagher & Flom
- City of Chicago v. Sessions (2018, brief pending) defending Chicago's lawsuit against Trump's Attorney General Jeff Sessions for restricting federal funds for hate crime and domestic violence prevention programs to sanctuary cities, with co-counsel Baker & McKenzie.
- City of El Cenizo v. Texas (U.S. Court of Appeals for the Fifth Circuit, 2017) challenging Texas SB4, an anti-immigrant law that could subject LGBTQ Asians and South Asians to racial profiling by local police, with co-counsel Reed Smith.
- United States v. Texas (U.S. Supreme Court, 2017) to defend President's Obama's executive actions to expand immigrant's rights on behalf of undocumented parents of dreamers, with co-counsel McDermott Will & Emery.

Asian American representation

- Favors v. Cuomo (U.S. District Court E.D.N.Y., 2014), to ensure Asian New Yorkers can enjoy equal political representation under a new redistricting plan, with co-counsel Kaye Scholer.
- Rick Perry, Governor of Texas v. Perez (U.S. Supreme Court, 2012), challenging state redistricting plans under the Voting Rights Act, with co-counsel Arnold & Porter Kaye Scholer.
- Rodriguez v. Pataki (U.S. District Court S.D.N.Y., 2003) . challenging the New York 2002 State Senate Redistricting plan that intentionally malapportions districts in New York City to dilute minority voting strength, with co-counsel Emery Celli Brinkerhoff & Abady

Minority Voter Suppression

- Arizona v. Inter-Tribal Council of Arizona (U.S. Supreme Court, 2012) and Gonzalez v. Arizona (U.S. Court of Appeals for the Ninth Circuit, 2010), representing Marvin Lim (before he became a Georgia State Representative) striking down Arizona's Proposition 200, a restrictive voter proof of citizenship requirement, with co-counsel Milbank, Tweed, Hadley & McCloy
- Crawford v. Marion County Election Board (U.S. Supreme Court, 2007) and Indiana Democratic Party v. Todd Rokita (U.S. Supreme Court, 2007), challenging voter ID laws because of their discriminatory impact and potential to disenfranchise Asian American voters, with co-counsel Orrick, Herrington & Sutcliffe.
- Applewhite v. Pennsylvania (Supreme Court of Pennsylvania, 2012) showing the significant and unnecessary burdens that the state's photo identification law will have on Asian American voters, with co-counsel White & Case.

Defending the Voting Rights Act

- Shelby County, Alabama v. Holder (U.S. Supreme Court, 2013) to uphold Congress's reauthorized enforcement provisions (Section 5) of the Voting Rights Act, by showing how it has safeguarded political representation of Asian Americans in Texas and New York and expanded bilingual ballots in New York City, with co-counsel Orrick, Herrington & Sutcliffe.
- Northwest Austin Municipal Utility District Number One v. Holder (U.S. Supreme Court, 2009), showing how Section 5 of the Voting Rights prevented the disenfranchisement of Asian Americans in school board elections, poll site changes, and language assistance, with co-counsel Proskauer Rose.

== Articles ==
- "Another Parade: The Olympics and LGBTQ Asians and Pacific Islanders," Angry Asian Man (2018)
- "#QUEERAZAADI: LGBTQ South Asians, Muslims & APIs Commemorate Lives Lost," Huffington Post (2017)
- "Never Forget, Never Again: The Anti-Muslim Travel Ban & LGBT Community," Huffington Post (2017)
- "Texas SB4’s Impact on Asian Americans – Why We Should Care," Huffington Post (2017)
- "Charlottesville, unnerving as it is brazen," Huffington Post (2017)
- "Why Asian Americans Voted Democratic," Asian Fortune (2012)

== Awards ==
- National Asian Pacific American Bar Association, Daniel K. Inouye Trailblazer Lifetime Achievement Award 2020.
- Walter & Evelyn Haas Jr. Fund Outstanding LGBTQ Leadership for Immigrants’ Rights Award (2017)
- Arcus Leadership Fellowship (2017)
- Gay City News Impact Award (2016)
- Haywood Burns Memorial Award (2015)
- AALAM Community Service Award (2005)

== Personal life ==
Magpantay entered into a same-sex domestic partnership with Christopher Goeken, former director of communications for the New York State Trial Lawyers Association, on September 17, 2005. They were married in a civil ceremony on February 8, 2013, by State Supreme Court Justice Doris Ling-Cohan, who had originally struck down New York's prohibition against same sex marriage in Hernandez v. Robles in 2004.

Goeken and Magpantay amicably divorced in 2020 and co-parent their son Malcolm.
