= Dear Colleague letter (United States) =

Type of official correspondence used in the US federal government

This letter was released by Jim Jordan during his run for Speaker of the House of Representatives in October 2023

A "Dear Colleague" letter is an official correspondence which is sent by a Member, committee, or officer of the United States House of Representatives or United States Senate and which is distributed in bulk to other congressional offices. A "Dear Colleague" letter may be circulated in paper form through internal mail, distributed on a chamber floor, or sent electronically.

"Dear Colleague" letters are often used to encourage others to cosponsor, support, or oppose a bill. "Dear Colleague" letters concerning a bill or resolution generally include a description of the legislation or other subject matter along with a reason or reasons for support or opposition. Senders or signatories of such letters become identified with the particular issue. "Dear Colleague" letters can also create an "unofficial link" in the Capitol Hill information chain.

Additionally, "Dear Colleague" letters are used to inform Members and their offices about events connected to congressional business or modifications to House or Senate operations. The Committee on House Administration and the Senate Committee on Rules and Administration, for example, routinely circulate "Dear Colleague" letters to Members concerning matters that affect House or Senate operations, such as House changes to computer password policies or a reminder about Senate restrictions on mass mailings prior to elections.

These letters frequently begin with the salutation "Dear Colleague". The length of such correspondence varies, with a typical "Dear Colleague" running one to two pages.

"Dear Colleague" letters have also been used by a number of executive agencies, often to make statements on policy or to otherwise disseminate information.

== Development ==
Member-to-Member correspondence has long been used in Congress. For example, given that early House rules required measures to be introduced only in a manner involving the "explicit approval of the full chamber", Representatives needed permission to introduce legislation. A not uncommon communication medium for soliciting support for this action was a letter to colleagues. Representative Abraham Lincoln, in 1849, formally notified his colleagues in writing that he intended to seek their authorization to introduce a bill to abolish slavery in the District of Columbia.

The phrase "Dear Colleague" has been used to refer to a widely distributed letter among Members at least since early in the 20th century. In 1913, The New York Times included the text of a "Dear Colleague" letter written by Representative Finly H. Gray to Representative Robert N. Page in which Gray outlined his "conceptions of a fit and proper manner" in which Members of the House should "show their respect for the President" and "express their well wishes" to the first family. In 1916, The Washington Post included the text of a "Dear Colleague" letter written by Representative William P. Borland and distributed to colleagues on the House floor. The letter provided an explanation of an amendment he had offered to a House bill.

Congress has since expanded its use of the Internet and electronic devices to facilitate distribution of legislative documents. Electronic "Dear Colleague" letters can be disseminated via internal networks in the House and Senate, supplementing or supplanting paper forms of the letters. Such electronic communication has increased the speed and facilitated the process of distributing "Dear Colleague" letters.

=== Use of "Dear Colleague" letters ===
In the contemporary Congress, Members use both printed copy distribution and electronic delivery for sending "Dear Colleague" letters.

=== House of Representatives ===
In the House, Members may choose to send "Dear Colleague" letters through internal mail, through the e-"Dear Colleague" system, or both. Regardless of distribution method, House "Dear Colleague" letters are required to address official business and must be signed by a Member or officer of Congress.

Members of the House often send out "Dear Colleague" letters to recruit cosponsors for their measures. The practice of recruiting cosponsors has become more important since the passage of H.Res. 42 in the 90th Congress (1967–1969). H.Res. 42 amended House rules to permit bill cosponsors, but limited the number to 25. In 1979, the House agreed to H.Res. 86, which further amended House rules to permit unlimited numbers of cosponsors.

==== Internal mail ====
"Dear Colleague" letters sent through internal mail must be written on official letterhead, address official business, and be signed by a Member or officer of Congress. A cover letter must accompany the "Dear Colleague" letter, addressed to the deputy chief administrative officer of the House for customer solutions, with specific distribution instructions and authorization as to the number to be distributed. The deadline for morning distribution is 9:45 a.m. and for afternoon mail delivery 1:45 p.m.

==== e-"Dear Colleague" system ====
An increasing number of congressional offices transmit "Dear Colleague" letters electronically. Pursuant to the House Members' Congressional Handbook, the rules regulating a paper "Dear Colleague" letter sent via internal mail are also applicable to a letter sent electronically. Electronic versions of "Dear Colleague" letters sent prior to August 12, 2008, are stored in a Microsoft Exchange public folder that is accessible to all House Members and staff. Electronic versions of "Dear Colleague" letters sent on or after August 12, 2008, are archived on the House e-"Dear Colleague" website.

Since 2003, 46,072 "Dear Colleague" letters have been sent electronically. In 2007, 12,297 "Dear Colleague" letters were sent electronically. Figure 1 shows the total number of "Dear Colleague" letters sent electronically between 2003 and 2007. The disparity in the number of "Dear Colleague" letters sent electronically between 2003-2006 and 2007 might be explained in part by increased use of electronic communications tools in the House.

A reduction in electronic "Dear Colleague" letters sent in August may occur because of the month-long district work period or recess that normally occurs in August. Following the August recess, especially in an election year, the number of "Dear Colleague" letters decreases. The decrease may occur as the result of Congress typically adjourning in the fall.

On August 12, 2008, the House introduced a web-based e-"Dear Colleague" distribution system. The e-"Dear Colleague" system replaced the email-based system. Under the e-"Dear Colleague" system, Members and staff "will be able to compose e-Dear Colleagues online, and associate them with up to three issue areas. Members and staff will be able to independently manage their subscription to various issue areas and receive e-Dear Colleagues according to individual interest."

=== Senate ===
Similar to the House paper system, "Dear Colleague" letters in the Senate are written on official letterhead and address official business, but there is not a central distribution policy. In general, when using the paper system, Senators and chamber officers create their own "Dear Colleague" letters and have them reproduced at the Senate Printing Graphics and Direct Mail Division. Once reproduced, letters are delivered to the Senate Mailroom by the sending office, accompanied by a distribution form or cover letter with specific distribution instructions.

The current distribution numbers for "Dear Colleague" letters in the Senate are

- 100 for all Senators;
- 20 for standing, select, and special committees;
- 5 for the joint leadership; and
- 1 each for the officers of the Senate (total of 7).

The choice to send "Dear Colleague" letters electronically is at the discretion of the individual Senate office. There is no central distribution system for electronic Senate "Dear Colleague" letters. While no central distribution system for electronic "Dear Colleague" letters exists in the Senate, other organizations (i.e., party organizations and informal caucuses) may choose to distribute "Dear Colleague" letters to their membership.

=== Executive agencies ===
Several agencies of the federal government have made use of "Dear Colleague" letters to disseminate information to the public, including those of the Department of Transportation, the Department of Health and Human Services, and the Department of Education. In particular, the Department of Education's Office for Civil Rights has used "Dear Colleague" letters to issue statements on policy regarding the interpretation of Title IX with respect to LGBT students and sexual assault.
