= Arthur Fletcher =

American politician (1924–2005)

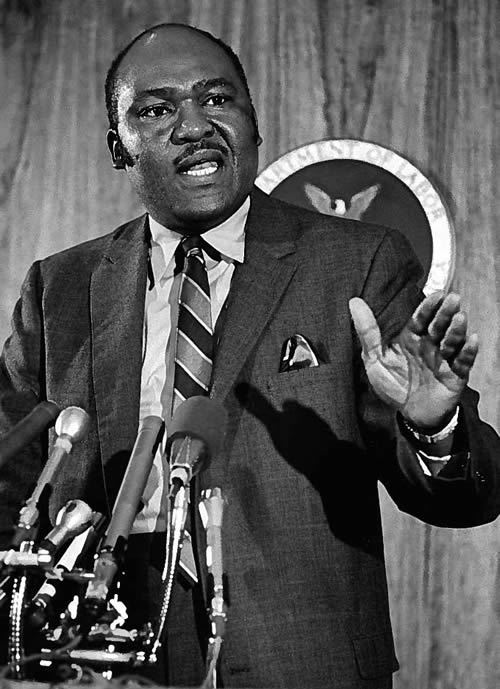

Chair of the United States Commission on Civil Rights
- In office 1990–1993
- President: George H. W. Bush; Bill Clinton
- Preceded by: William B. Allen
- Succeeded by: Mary Frances Berry

Personal details
- Born: Edward Arthur Allen; December 22, 1924 Phoenix, Arizona, U.S.
- Died: July 12, 2005 (aged 80) Washington, D.C., U.S.
- Resting place: Arlington National Cemetery
- Party: Republican
- Spouses: Mary Harden (m. 1943; died 1960); Bernyce Hassan (m. 1965)
- Education: Washburn University (BA); La Salle Extension University (LLB)

Military service
- Branch/service: U.S. Army
- Years of service: 1943–1945
- Battles/wars: World War II

Arthur Allen Fletcher (born Edward Arthur Allen; December 22, 1924 – July 12, 2005) was an American government official and Republican politician, he was a pioneer of affirmative action as he was largely responsible for the Revised Philadelphia Plan.

== Biography ==
Fletcher was born Edward Arthur Allen on December 22, 1924, in Phoenix, Arizona, to Edna Miller and Samuel Brit Allen. In 1938, he changed his name to Arthur Allen Fletcher, following his adoption by his stepfather, Andrew "Cotton" Fletcher. In 1943, Fletcher joined the U.S. Army and did training at Fort Knox. Arthur Fletcher, a Republican, graduated from Washburn University and obtained a degree from distance learning school La Salle Extension University.

In 1950, he played two games with the NFL's Baltimore Colts, thus becoming the first Black professional player in any sport in the city's history.

Fletcher moved with his second wife, Bernyce Hassan, and two youngest children to Pasco, Washington, where he took a job with the Hanford Atomic Energy Project. He also organized a community self-help program in predominantly black East Pasco and landed a seat on the Pasco City Council. In 1968, Fletcher ran for Lieutenant Governor of Washington State and narrowly lost to the incumbent, John Cherberg. Fletcher was the first African American in Washington as well as the West to contest a statewide electoral office. During the campaign, his driver and bodyguard was Ted Bundy, the serial killer who was active in Republican Party politics in the late 1960s through the early 1970s.

Fletcher's close race for Lieutenant Governor got the attention of newly elected President Richard Nixon, who gave Fletcher a job in the incoming administration as Assistant Secretary of Labor. An African American, he served in the Nixon, Ford, Reagan, and George H. W. Bush administrations.

In 1978, Fletcher ran for mayor of Washington, D.C., but was defeated by the popular Democrat Marion Barry. In 1995, he briefly pursued a bid for the Republican presidential nomination.

Numbers of his fellow Republicans were often at odds with the affirmative action policies which Fletcher initiated and supported as the chairman from 1990 to 1993 of the United States Commission on Civil Rights.

As head of the United Negro College Fund, Fletcher was rumored to have coined the famous slogan, "A mind is a terrible thing to waste." In point of fact, however, the motto was created by Forest Long, of the advertising agency Young & Rubicam, in partnership with the Ad Council.

Fletcher was a United States Army veteran during World War II and upon his death in 2005 was buried in Arlington National Cemetery.

== Personal life ==
In the summer of 1943, he married his first wife, Mary Harden. They had five children. Mary died by suicide on October 2, 1960, after jumping off the Bay Bridge. In April 1965, he married his second wife, Bernyce Hassan, a divorced mother.

Party political offices
Preceded by Jackson Champion	Republican nominee for Mayor of the District of Columbia; 1978	Succeeded by Brooke Lee
Government offices
Preceded by William B. Allen	Chair of the United States Commission on Civil Rights; 1990–1993	Succeeded by Mary Frances Berry
