= Danielle Allen =

American classicist and political scientist

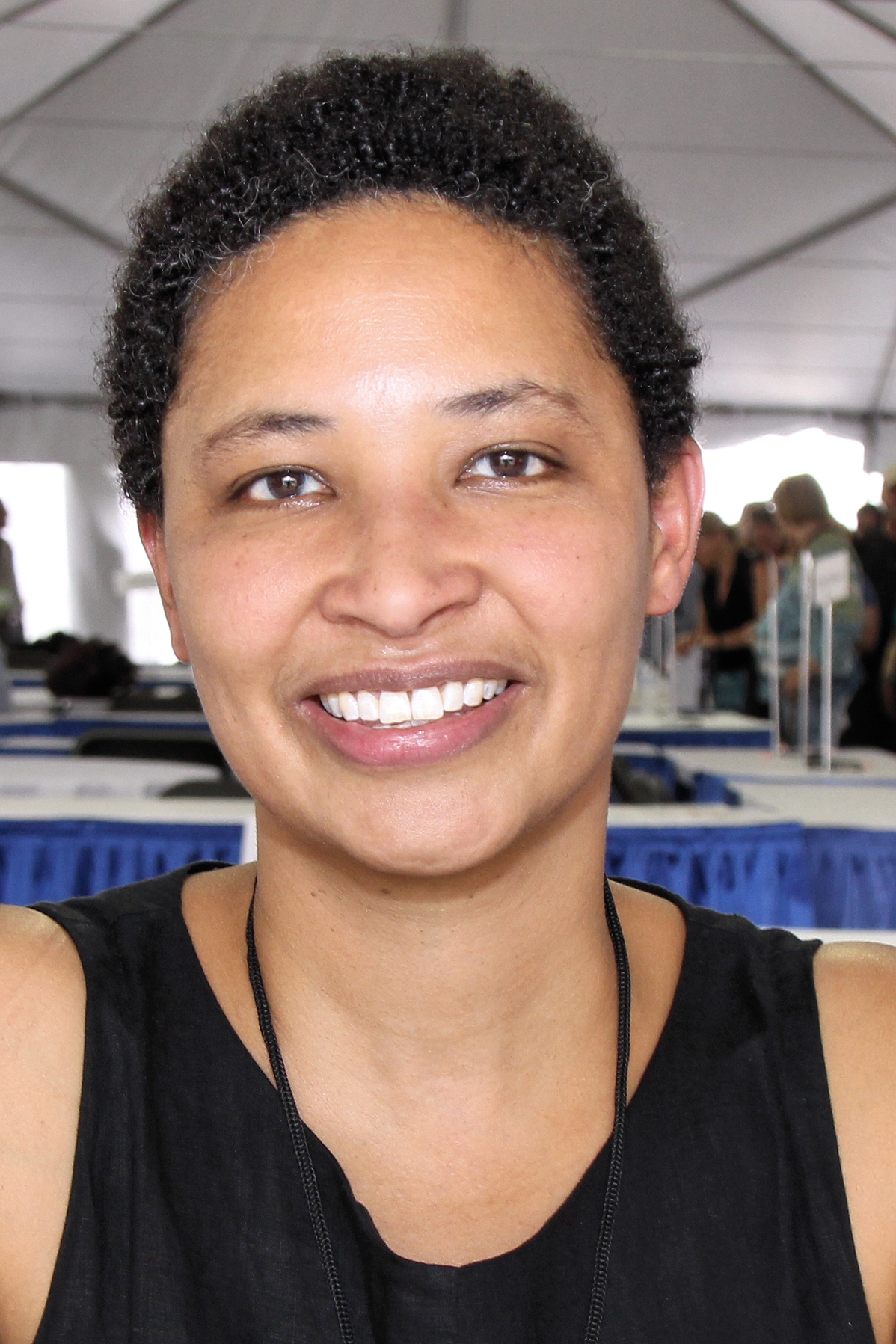
- Allen in 2017
- Born: November 3, 1971 (age 54); Takoma Park, Maryland, U.S.
- Political party: Democratic
- Parent: William B. Allen (father)
- Awards: Kluge Prize (2020); Francis Parkman Prize (2015)

Academic background
- Education: Princeton University (BA); King's College, Cambridge (MPhil, PhD); Harvard University (MA, PhD)
- Theses: A Situation of Punishment (1996); Intricate Democracy (2001)

Academic work
- Discipline: Classics; Political science
- Institutions: University of Chicago; Institute for Advanced Study; Harvard University

Danielle Susan Allen (born November 3, 1971) is an American classicist and political scientist. She is the James Bryant Conant University Professor at Harvard University. She is also the former Director of the Edmond & Lily Safra Center for Ethics at Harvard University.

Prior to joining the faculty at Harvard in 2015, Allen was UPS Foundation Professor at the Institute for Advanced Study in Princeton, New Jersey.

Allen was a contributing columnist at The Washington Post until she announced in December 2020 that she was exploring a run for Governor of Massachusetts in 2022. She formally announced her campaign for the Democratic Party nomination in June 2021, but then dropped out of the race in February 2022.

== Early life and education ==
Allen was born in 1971 in Takoma Park, Maryland. She is the daughter of the conservative political scientist William B. Allen. Her mother, Susan, was a research librarian and her parents interracially married at a time when interracial marriage was illegal in many US states. Allen's grandfather was a Baptist preacher who helped found the first NAACP chapter in North Florida and her great-grandmother was a suffragette. Allen was raised in Claremont, California, where her father taught at Harvey Mudd College. She attended and graduated from Claremont High School in California.

Allen matriculated at Princeton University, where she obtained a Bachelor of Arts in classics, summa cum laude, in 1993 and was elected to Phi Beta Kappa. Allen completed a senior thesis titled "The State of Judgment" under the supervision of Andre Laks. At Princeton, she was a member of The Princeton Tory.

Allen received a Marshall Scholarship to study at King's College at the University of Cambridge, where she received a Master of Philosophy (M.Phil.) and Doctor of Philosophy (Ph.D.) in classics in 1994 and 1996, respectively. Her dissertation was titled "A Situation of Punishment: The Politics and Ideology of Athenian Punishment". Allen then pursued further graduate studies at Harvard University, earning a Master of Arts (M.A.) in government in 1998 and a Ph.D. in government in 2001. Her second dissertation was titled "Intricate Democracy: Hobbes, Ellison, and Aristotle on Distrust, Rhetoric, and Civic Friendship".

== Academic career ==
From 1997 to 2007, she served on the faculty of the University of Chicago, earning appointments as a professor of both classics and political science, as well as membership on the university's Committee on Social Thought. She served as Dean of the Division of the Humanities from 2004 to 2007. She organized The Dewey Seminar: Education, Schools and the State, with Rob Reich.

She is a former trustee of Amherst College and Princeton University, and is a past chair of the Pulitzer Prize board where she served from 2007 to 2015. She was the UPS Foundation Professor at the Institute for Advanced Study in Princeton, before joining the Harvard faculty and becoming director of the Safra Center in 2015.

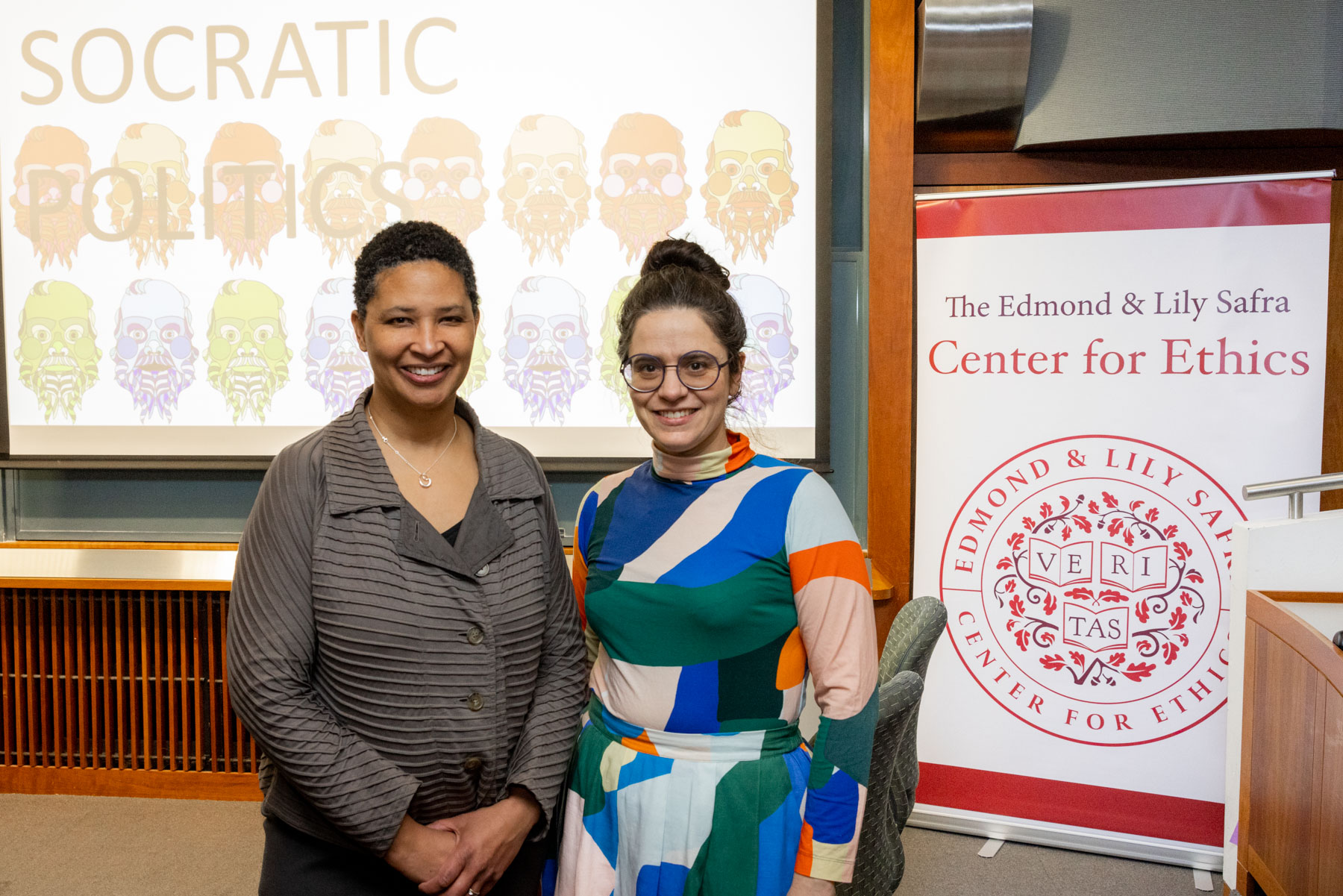
Allen welcoming Agnes Callard to give the Mala and Solomon Kamm Lecture in Ethics in 2023

She was named a MacArthur Foundation Fellow in 2001, in recognition of her combining "the classicist's careful attention to texts and language with the political theorist's sophisticated and informed engagement". An elected member of the American Academy of Arts and Sciences and the American Philosophical Society, Allen is a past chair of the Mellon Foundation board of trustees.

The New Yorker published Allen's "The Life of a South Central Statistic" in its July 24, 2017, issue.

Together with Stephen B. Heintz and Eric Liu, Allen chaired the bipartisan Commission on the Practice of Democratic Citizenship of the American Academy of Arts and Sciences. The commission, which was launched "to explore how best to respond to the weaknesses and vulnerabilities in our political and civic life and to enable more Americans to participate as effective citizens in a diverse 21st-century democracy", issued a report, titled Our Common Purpose: Reinventing American Democracy for the 21st Century, in June 2020. The report included strategies and policy recommendations "to help the nation emerge as a more resilient democracy by 2026".

In October 2022, Allen joined the Council for Responsible Social Media project launched by Issue One to address the negative mental, civic, and public health impacts of social media in the United States, co-chaired by former House Democratic Caucus Leader Dick Gephardt and former Massachusetts Lieutenant Governor Kerry Healey.

In March 2025, Allen, alongside fellow Harvard Kennedy School faculty member Jeffrey Liebman, launched the Impact Lives Initiative. The Impact Lives Initiative was launched to assist social scientists in getting governmental recognition. This fellowship accumulated a total of eight participating Harvard University professors, who each received inaugural grants.

== Political career ==
Allen announced in December 2020 that she would explore a candidacy in the 2022 Massachusetts gubernatorial race. She announced on February 15, 2022, that she had no path, and ended her campaign on "pure math."

== Personal life ==
Allen is married to the Harvard philosopher James Doyle and has two children.

== Awards and honors ==
- 2025 Barry Prize for Distinguished Intellectual Achievement, American Academy of Sciences and Letters
- 2020 John W. Kluge Prize, Library of Congress
- 2015 Francis Parkman Prize
- 2009 Member of the American Academy of Arts and Sciences
- 2001 MacArthur Fellows Program
- Quantrell Award
- 1993 Marshall Scholar

== Works ==
- Radical Duke: How One Aristocrat—and the American Revolution—Transformed Britain. Liveright Publishing. 2026. ISBN 9781631497551.
- Justice by Means of Democracy. University of Chicago Press. 2023. ISBN 9780226777122.
- Democracy in the Time of Coronavirus. University of Chicago Press. 2022. ISBN 9780226815619.
- Difference Without Domination. University of Chicago Press. 2020. ISBN 978-0226681191.
- Cuz: An American Tragedy. Liveright. 2018. ISBN 978-1-63149-311-9.
- Education and Equality. University of Chicago Press. 2016. ISBN 978-0226373102.
- From Voice to Influence: Understanding Citizenship in a Digital Age. University of Chicago Press. 2015. ISBN 978-0-226-26212-3.
- Our Declaration: A Reading of the Declaration of Independence in Defense of Equality. W. W. Norton. 2015. ISBN 978-1631490446.
- Education, Justice and Democracy. University of Chicago. 2013. ISBN 9780226012933.
- Why Plato Wrote. Wiley. 2010. ISBN 978-1-4443-3448-7.
- "It's Up to Obama". Democracy (16). Spring 2010.
- Talking to Strangers: Anxieties of Citizenship Since Brown vs. the Board of Education. University of Chicago Press. 2004. ISBN 978-0-226-01466-1.
- The World of Prometheus: The Politics of Punishing in Democratic Athens. Princeton University Press. 2002 [2000]. ISBN 978-0-691-09489-2.
