= David Kladney =

David Kladney is an American attorney and a Commissioner on the United States Commission on Civil Rights. Much of his career has involved pro bono work for people with disabilities.

== Education ==
Kladney has a BA degree in journalism from the University of Nevada, Reno and a JD from California Western School of Law.

== Career ==
Kladney began his career as a TV news broadcaster in Reno, Nevada. After several years, he attended law school in San Diego. In 1977 he returned to Nevada to serve as in-house counsel for the State of Nevada Employees Association. He was subsequently a sole practitioner for 20 years, with a practice centered on civil litigation and representing disabled clients. During this time he was also a Deputy Attorney General for the State of Nevada.

He has often been recognized for his pro bono work. In 2000, he closed his law practice and began offering full-time free legal work to people in need. He received many awards for his work culminating in 2004 when he was named Nevada Pro Bono Lawyer of the Year by the Nevada Supreme Court.

In 2011, he was appointed to the U.S. Commission on Civil Rights. He was reappointed by the U.S. Senate on November 15, 2016. Among his activities at the commission, he has advocated for criminal justice reform and against patient dumping, a practice where healthcare facilities release indigent or mentally ill patients to the streets, sometimes providing them with one-way transportation to cities where they have no friends or families. He has sponsored and lead investigations into sexual assault in the military, enforcement of requirements of the National Voter Registration Act, police use of force, collateral consequences of incarceration, the civil rights and treatment of women in prison, subminimum wages and people with disabilities, and the civil rights implications of cash bail. He has appeared numerous times on C-SPAN, discussing topics such as LGBT employees and workplace discrimination, various aspects of immigration detention facilities, civil rights of veterans and military service members, sexual assault in the military, and taking private property for public use. In his role as commissioner, he has also written opinion pieces on police reform.

== Philanthropy ==
Kladney is a founding member of the Nevada Festival Ballet and the Nevada Chapter of the Make-A-Wish Foundation.
