= Clarence M. Pendleton Jr. =

American educator and politician (1930–1988)

Clarence McClane Pendleton Jr.
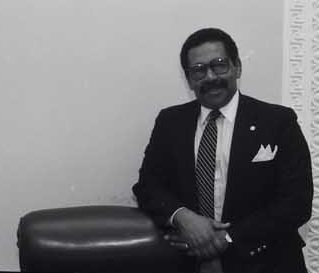
- 1981 in White House

Chair of the United States Commission on Civil Rights
- In office November 16, 1981 – June 5, 1988
- President: Ronald Reagan
- Preceded by: Arthur Sherwood Flemming
- Succeeded by: William B. Allen

Personal details
- Born: November 10, 1930 Louisville, Kentucky, U.S.
- Died: June 5, 1988 (aged 57) San Diego, California, U.S.
- Party: Democratic (before 1980); Republican (1980–1988)
- Spouse: Magrit Pendleton
- Children: 3
- Education: Howard University (BS)
- Occupation: Educator; Government official

Military service
- Allegiance: United States
- Branch/service: United States Army
- Years of service: 1954–1957

Clarence McClane Pendleton Jr. (November 10, 1930 – June 5, 1988) was the politically conservative African American chairman of the United States Commission on Civil Rights, a position that he held from 1981 until his death during the administration of U.S. President Ronald Reagan.

== Background ==
A native of Louisville, Kentucky, Pendleton was raised in Washington, D.C., where he graduated from historically black Dunbar High School and then Howard University, where his father, Clarence Pendleton, was the first swimming coach at the institution. After high school, Pendleton, like his grandfather and father before him, enrolled at Howard where he earned a Bachelor of Science degree in 1954. After a three-year tour of duty in the United States Army during the Cold War, Pendleton returned to Howard, where he was on the physical education faculty and pursued his master's degree in professional education. Pendleton succeeded his father as the Howard swimming coach, and the team procured ten championships in eleven years. He also coached rowing, football, and baseball at Howard.

From 1968 to 1970, Pendleton was the recreation coordinator under the Model Cities Program in Baltimore, Maryland. In 1970, he was named director of the urban affairs department of the National Recreation and Park Association. In 1972, Mayor Pete Wilson, later a U.S. senator and the governor of California, recruited Pendleton to head the Model Cities program in San Diego, California. In 1975, Pendleton was named director of the San Diego branch of the National Urban League.

A former liberal Democrat, Pendleton switched to the Republican Party in 1980 and supported Reagan for President. Pendleton claimed that minorities had become dependent on government social programs which create a cycle of dependence. African Americans, he said, should build strong relations with the private sector and end ties to liberal bureaucrats and philosophies.

== United States Commission on Civil Rights ==
In his first year in office, President Reagan named Pendleton to replace the liberal Republican commission chairman, Arthur Sherwood Flemming, who had been the United States Secretary of Health, Education, and Welfare during the final years of the Eisenhower administration. The Republican-majority U.S. Senate approved the nomination, and Pendleton became the first black chairman of the commission. He supported the Reagan social agenda and hence came into conflict with long-established civil rights views. He opposed the use of cross-town school busing to bring about racial balance among pupils. He challenged the need for affirmative action policies because he claimed that African Americans could succeed without special consideration being written into law. Pendleton was as outspoken on the political right as was the later Democratic chairman Mary Frances Berry on the left. Pendleton made headlines for saying black civil rights leaders were "the new racists" because they advocated affirmative action, racial quotas, and set-asides. He likened the feminist issue of equal pay for equal work, written into law in the Equal Pay Act of 1963, to be "like reparations for white women."

Pendleton denounced the feminist concept of comparable worth in the establishment of male and female pay scales as "probably the looniest idea since Looney Tunes came on the screen."

Under Pendleton's chairmanship, congressional funding for the agency was reduced. This prompted some staff members either to lose their positions or to leave the agency in discouragement. Pendleton was considered acerbic by his liberal critics. William Bradford Reynolds, Reagan's Assistant Attorney General for Civil Rights, described his friend Pendleton as "a man of candor who felt very deeply that the individuals in America should deal with one another as brothers and sisters totally without regard to race and background."

On December 23, 1983, with two Democratic members named by the House dissenting, Pendleton was reelected to a second term as commission chairman. He drew the backing of Reagan's new appointee, Esther Buckley, an educator from Laredo, Texas.

Under Pendleton's tenure, the commission was split by an internal debate over fundamental principles of equality under the law. The commission narrowed the description of legal and political rights at the expense of social and economic claims. The debate centered principally between Pendleton and Berry, an original appointee of President Jimmy Carter. Democrat Morris B. Abram, also a Reagan appointee, was vice chairman under Pendleton. He described "an intellectual sea change" at the agency with the conservative view dominant at that time. Authorized under the Civil Rights Act of 1957, the commission was reconstituted by a 1983 law of Congress after Reagan dismissed three commissioners critical of his policies.

In the spring of 1986, the Los Angeles Times urged that the outspoken Pendleton either be removed from the commission or that his policies be reversed in the interest of minorities and women. A reader of the Los Angeles Times challenged the newspaper's position regarding Pendleton in a Letter to the Editor: "Once again, The Times is advocating quotas, so-called affirmative action and other failed and discredited policies that germinated during Lyndon Johnson's not-so-Great Society of the late 1960s."

== Sudden death ==
On June 5, 1988, Pendleton collapsed while working out at the San Diego Hilton Tennis Club. He died an hour later of a heart attack at a hospital. President Reagan rang his wife Magrit to offer his condolences, writing in his diary: "Another sad phone call to Clarence Pendleton's widow—a widow as of yesterday. He had a heart attack while riding an exercycle."

The White House released a statement that day from the President which said:

Yesterday, with the sudden death of Clarence Pendleton, America lost a leading apostle of a just and colorblind society...In his uncompromising articulation of the ideal of a colorblind society open to all without regard to race, giving no quarter to either prejudice or preference, Penny insisted that the full brunt of the law should be brought to bear on discrimination. At the same time, he understood that the law must itself not deviate from the Constitution's mandate of nondiscrimination for any reason lest it become a double-edged sword, harming the innocent and poorly serving those most in need of protection... Penny has been taken from us—and my heart goes out to his family and friends—but what Penny leaves us are fond memories of a man who loved life and made us love it more for his time among us, and a fuller confidence, because of his work, that one day all Americans will be judged not by stereotypes and prejudices but on their own merits, qualifications, performance—as Penny often quoted Martin Luther King, Jr., "not by the color of their skin but by the content of their character."

On Pendleton's death, Francis Guess, another black Republican on the commission, said that the chairman's colorful statement weakened his debate points: "It is sad that Chairman Pendleton's legacy will revolve around not what he said, but how he said it."

William B. Allen, an African American political scientist formerly at Michigan State University who succeeded Pendleton as the commission chairman and served in that capacity from 1988 to 1989, said that Pendleton "taught us that we could talk about civil rights without being a one-note band. ... We're a symphony. He reminded us that affirmative action was a goal and not a remedy." In his eulogy of Pendleton, Allen refers to the former chairman as "a brave man, whose bravery and great self-sacrifice were summoned by the cause of America, not as a once great accomplishment but as a powerful idea."

A memorial bench dedicated in Pendleton's honor is located in the De Anza Cove section of Mission Bay Park in San Diego.

Political offices
Preceded by Arthur Sherwood Flemming	Chairman of the United States Commission on Civil Rights; 1981–1988	Succeeded by William B. Allen
