= Peter Kirsanow =

American lawyer and politician (born 1953)

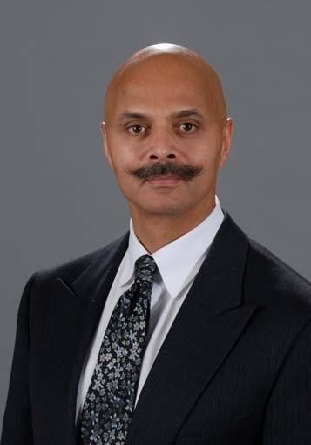
- Official portrait, 2006

Chair of the United States Commission on Civil Rights
- Incumbent
- Assumed office January 20, 2025
- President: Donald Trump
- Preceded by: Rochelle Mercedes Garza

Personal details
- Born: October 30, 1953 (age 73) Cleveland, Ohio, U.S.
- Party: Republican
- Education: Cornell University (BA); Cleveland State University (JD)
- Website: Official website

Peter N. Kirsanow (born October 30, 1953) is a lawyer and civil-rights commissioner serving on the United States Commission on Civil Rights since 2025. A member of the Republican Party, he served as a member of the National Labor Relations Board (NLRB) from 2006 to 2008.

== Education ==
Kirsanow received his Bachelor of Arts from Cornell University in 1976 and then in 1979 received his Juris Doctor cum laude from the Cleveland State University College of Law, where he served as articles editor of the Cleveland State Law Review.

== Career ==
Kirsanow served as labor counsel for the City of Cleveland and as senior labor counsel of Leaseway Transportation Corp.

Kirsanow was appointed to the U.S. Commission on Civil Rights by President George W. Bush in December 2001, but Chairwoman Mary Frances Berry told the White House that it would take federal marshals to seat Kirsanow, fighting his appointment all the way to the U.S. Supreme Court. In May 2002, the United States Department of Justice prevailed in its lawsuit to seat Kirsanow as a member of the commission. He was re-appointed by President Bush to serve a second six-year term on the commission, and then re-appointed once more by U.S. House Speaker Paul Ryan.

President Bush appointed Kirsanow to the five-member NLRB in 2006 for two years, where he was involved with significant decisions including Oakwood Healthcare, Inc., Dana/Metaldyne and Oil Capital Sheet Metal, Inc. In 2008, Kirsanow returned to the Cleveland law firm of Benesch Friedlander Coplan & Aronoff LLP, where he is a partner with the firm's Labor & Employment Practice Group and a member of the Diversity & Inclusion Committee. He represents management in employment-related litigation, contract negotiations, NLRB proceedings and EEO matters.

Kirsanow has written articles for National Review since 2003. Kirsanow testified before the Senate Judiciary Committee on the nominations of John Roberts, Samuel Alito, Sonia Sotomayor and Elena Kagan to the Supreme Court, and at the confirmation hearing for Jeff Sessions nomination for United States Attorney General.

== Bar admissions and associations ==
- Ohio, 1979
- U.S. District Court for the Northern District of Ohio, 1984
- U.S. Court of Appeals, District of Columbia Circuit

== Memberships ==
- Past Chair of the Board of Directors, The Center for New Black Leadership
- Member of the advisory board of the National Center for Public Policy Research
- Adjunct Professor, Cleveland State University, Cleveland-Marshall College of Law, 1992-1993
- Member, National Labor Relations Board, 2006-2008
- Commissioner, U.S. Commission on Civil Rights, 2002-

== Books ==
- "Target Omega" (2017)
- "Second Strike" (2018)
