= 1978 Washington, D.C., mayoral election =

- November 7, 1978
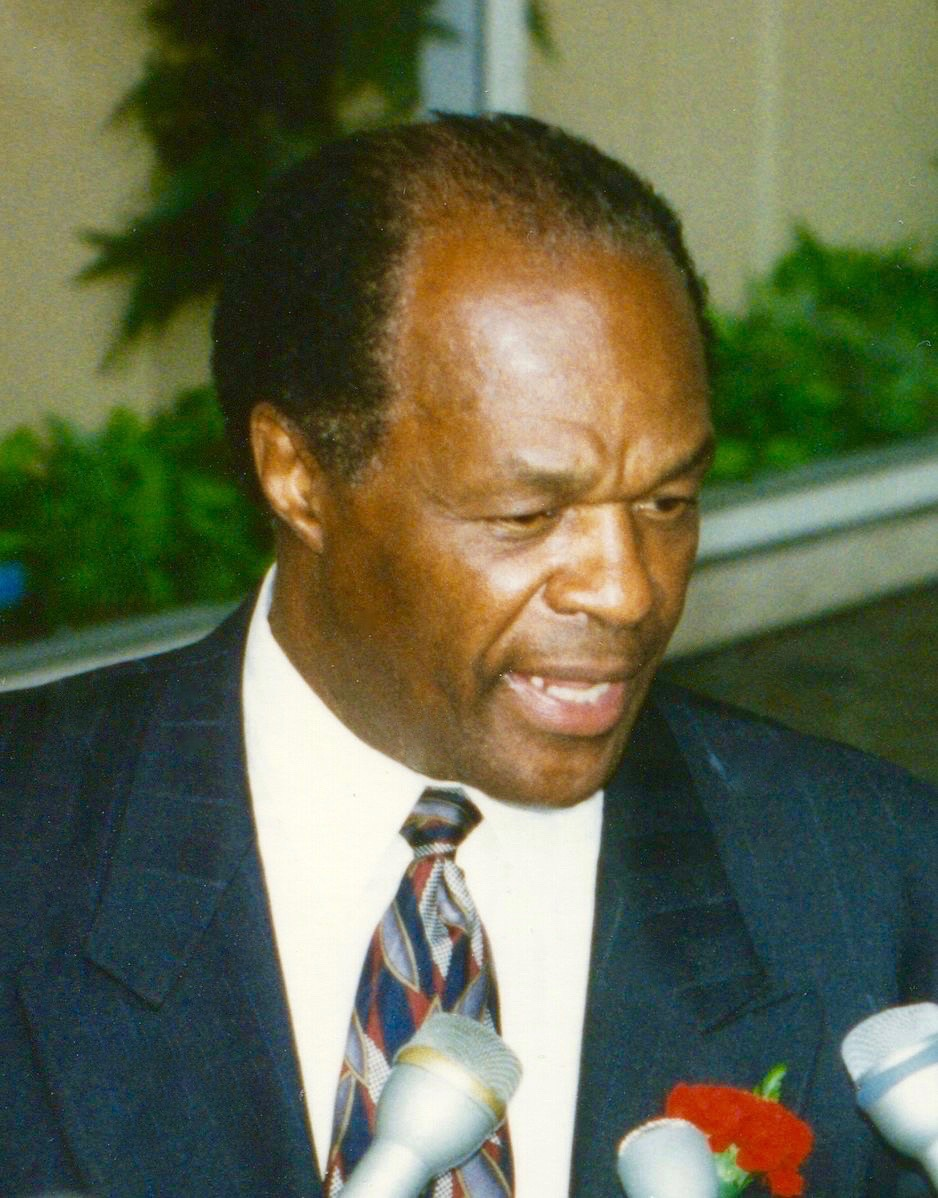

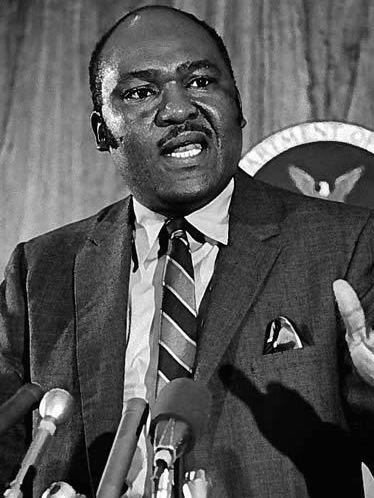
Nominee	Marion Barry	Arthur Fletcher
Party	Democratic	Republican
Popular vote	68,354	27,366
Percentage	70.16%	28.09%
- Results by ward Barry: 50–60% 60–70% 70–80%
Mayor before election
Walter Washington
Democratic
Elected mayor
Marion Barry
Democratic

On November 7, 1978, Washington, D.C., held the second election for its mayor as a result of the District of Columbia Home Rule Act. The primary election of the Democratic Party (the most important contest in the race, as 90% of the District's voters were registered Democrats) took place on Tuesday, September 12, with At-Large Councilman Marion Barry defeating incumbent mayor Walter E. Washington and Council Chair Sterling Tucker to become the Democratic nominee for Mayor. Barry defeated Republican nominee Arthur Fletcher and two marginal candidates in the general election on November 7, 1978.

== Democratic primary ==
=== Candidates ===
- Walter Washington, incumbent mayor. Washington had been the last appointed head of the city, serving as Mayor-Commissioner under President Lyndon Johnson, before being elected DC's first home rule mayor.
- Marion Barry, at-large member of the D.C. Council. Berry had moved to the District in 1965 while the head of the Student Nonviolent Coordinating Committee (SNCC), and had evolved into radical civil rights activism on the local DC level by the end of the 1960s, founding the activist group Pride, Inc. to provide employment for the city's poor black community. However, he had gained the support of the city's wealthy white liberal establishment and had begun to move through the city's public ranks when elected president of the school board in 1972, then to the Council two years later.
- Sterling Tucker, chair of the D.C. Council. Tucker was the early favorite in the race. Like Washington, Tucker had been in Johnson's appointed DC government, the president's choice for council chair in 1967; previously he had been head of the DC chapter of the Urban League and was seen as a moderate crusader for civil rights. Tucker had the support of the city's black ministers, one of the most influential political blocs, and the business community.

=== Campaign ===
By 1978, though he still had the support of the city's unions, Washington was largely seen as a caretaker mayor whose mayoralty had served a purpose of transition the city from federal oversight to local independence. In his term as mayor, Washington had appointed white politicians to his high-level administration positions, which had alienated the black majority of the city's population who felt that the black-majority city should be run by black officials. Additionally, Washington's history as a former presidential appointee raised suspicions that he was too closely tied to the city's former federal custodians.

Tucker was the early favorite in the race.

Barry, who had enjoyed support from white liberal Washingtonians as a city councilor retained their support for his mayoral campaign. Barry's mayoral campaign also enjoyed support from the city's gay community, as well as the backing of the DC Board of Trade and the support of many veteran civil rights movement activists. However, Barry remained in third place until The Washington Post endorsed him on August 30, two weeks before the election.

=== Results ===
The primary was held on September 12. It saw a very narrow three-way finish. Barry beat Tucker by an extremely small margin of 1,400 votes, close enough that Tucker did not concede until after a recount had taken place. Incumbent mayor Washington finished third, with just under 3,000 votes less than Barry.

1978 Washington, D.C. mayoral election, Democratic primary results
Party	Candidate	Votes	%	±%
Democratic	Marion Barry	31,265	34.94	
Democratic	Sterling Tucker	29,909	33.43	
Democratic	Walter Washington	28,286	31.62	

== General election ==
=== Campaign ===
In the November general election, Barry faced Arthur Fletcher, an African-American Republican who had served as an Assistant Secretary in Richard Nixon's Department of Labor. Fletcher approached the race by accusing Barry of being the white man's candidate, a tactic which The Washington Post criticized as "unforgivably shabby." On November 7, Barry won a landslide election with 70% of the vote.

=== Results ===
1978 Washington, D.C. mayoral election results
Party	Candidate	Votes	%	±%
Democratic	Marion Barry	68,354	70.16	−12.29
Republican	Arthur Fletcher	27,366	28.09	+24.44
U.S. Labor	Susan Pennington	1,066	1.09	
Independent	Glova Scott	638	0.66	
Majority				
Turnout				

== See also ==
- Electoral history of Marion Barry
