= William B. Allen =

American political scientist (born 1944)

William Allen
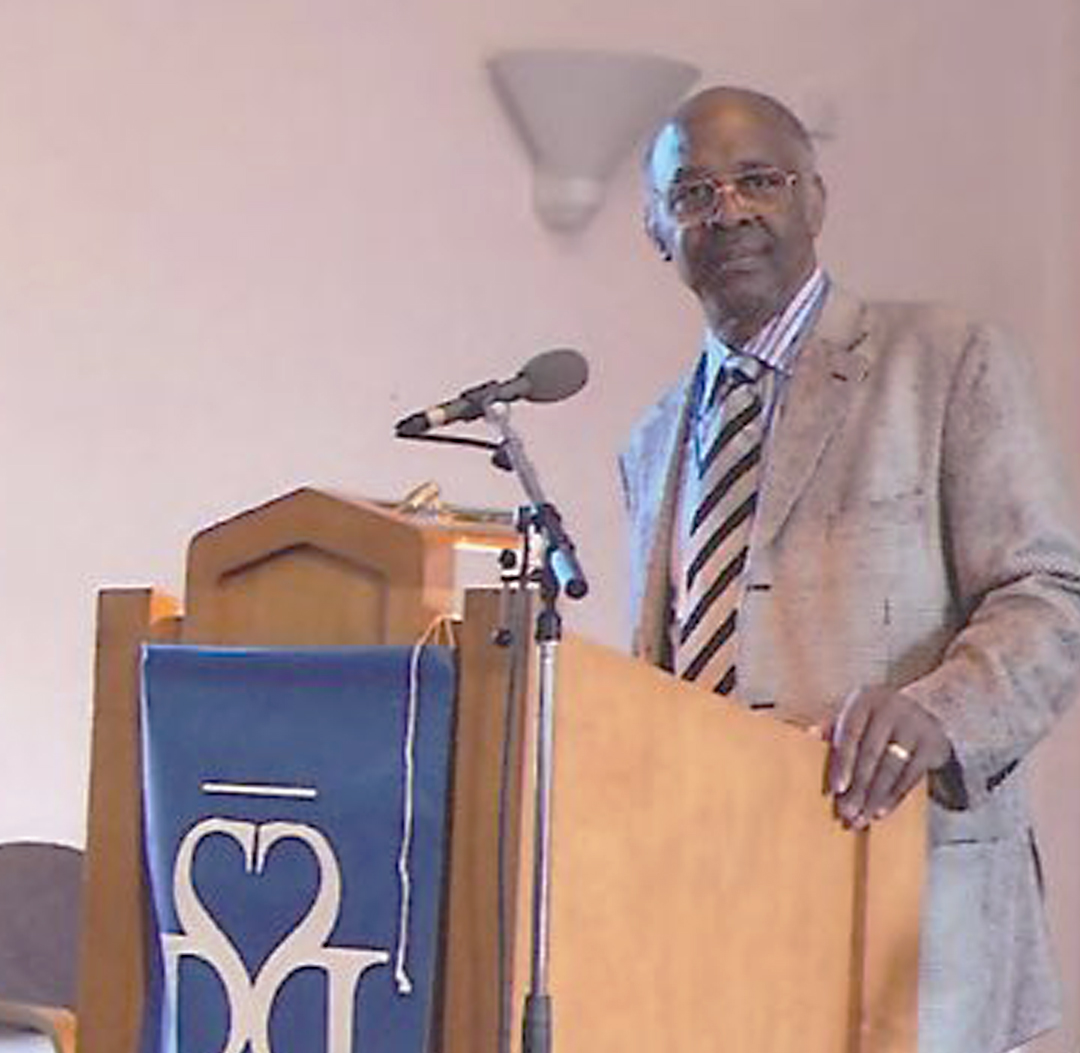

Chair of the United States Commission on Civil Rights
- In office August 8, 1988 – October 23, 1989
- President: Ronald Reagan; George H. W. Bush
- Preceded by: Clarence Pendleton
- Succeeded by: Arthur Fletcher

Personal details
- Born: 1944 (age 81–82) Fernandina Beach, Florida, U.S.
- Children: Danielle
- Education: Pepperdine College (BA); Claremont Graduate University (MA, PhD)

William Barclay Allen (born 1944) is an American author, professor, and political scientist from Fernandina Beach, Florida. He was a member of the National Council on the Humanities from 1984 to 1987 and chairman of the United States Commission on Civil Rights from 1988 to 1989. Allen ran as a Republican for a U.S. Senate seat in California in 1986 and 1992, losing in the primary election each time. Allen has been described as a "conservative black leader in education."

== Biography ==
Allen received a Ph.D. in 1972 from Claremont Graduate University.

In February, 1989:

"Allen and a former commission psychologist, acccompanied [sic] by a TV crew, visited an Arizona Indian reservation to interview a 14-year-old Apache girl, the subject of a custody battle between her natural mother and the white couple who had adopted her. Allen contends that the girl wants to leave the reservation, though the mother has formal custody. The commissioner and the psychologist picked the girl up for the interview on her way home from school. Although they then took her to her mother, the mother filed a kidnaping charge against Allen. He was arrested by local police and detained for five hours."

Allen and the commission pyshologist, Barry Goodfield, were released after explaining the circumstances. Reactions to the incident would later throw the United States Civil Rights Commission "into disarray", with commission member Robert Destro saying that the charges were "most serious, and have the potential for severe damage to the commission, to the credibility of its members and to the credibility of its work." Allen denied committing any crime, but said that matter had "taken an unfortunate turn" and asked for all the commission's members to resign due its "badly fractured" and "impotent" condition.

In June 1998, Allen became the state of Virginia's chief executive for public higher education, a position he left after a "tumultuous" 13 months. He submitted his resignation, in large part, so he could continue a romantic relationship with a co-worker.

Allen lobbied in support of the Michigan Civil Rights Initiative, also known as Proposal 2, that would essentially ban affirmative action in the state. He and Carol M. Allen did this through a foundation called "Toward A Fair Michigan."

From 2018 to 2019, he was a visiting scholar in "conservative thought and policy" at the University of Colorado Boulder.

Allen is a resident scholar and the former chief operating officer of the Center for Urban Renewal and Education, founded by conservative activist Star Parker.

In 2023, Allen appeared on The Ben Shapiro Show, where he discussed The State of Black America, a book that "explores the history and future of black America without the lens of victimization and government dependency", and how "government destroyed the black family".

== Personal life ==
Allen is the father of classicist and political scientist Danielle Allen.

== Fellowships and awards ==
- LL.D. (honoris causa), Averett College, 1998.
- Ll.D. (honoris causa), 1988, Pepperdine University.

== Publications ==
=== Select bibliography ===
- George Washington: America's First Progressive (Peter Lang, Inc.), 2008.
- The Personal and the Political: Three Fables by Montesquieu (UPA), 2008.
- Re-Thinking Uncle Tom: The Political Philosophy of H. B. Stowe (Lexington Books), 2008.
- Habits of Mind: Fostering Excellence and Access in Higher Education, with Carol M. Allen (Transaction Publishers, Inc.), 2003.
- George Washington: A Collection, editor and Introduction (Liberty Press, 1988), 3rd printing, 2003.
- The Essential Antifederalist: Second Edition, with Gordon Lloyd (Rowman & Littlefield), 2002.
- The Federalist Papers: A Commentary: The "Baton Rouge Lectures". A full-length commentary, plus an analytical legal index (Peter Lang, Inc.), 2000.
- Let the Advice Be Good: A Defense of Madison's Democratic Nationalism (University Press of America), 1994.

=== Journals ===
- The Imaginative Conservative
- Imprimis

== See also ==
- United States Commission on Civil Rights

Political offices
Preceded by Clarence M. Pendleton, Jr.	Chairman of the United States Commission on Civil Rights; 1988–1989	Succeeded by Arthur Fletcher
