= Gerald A. Reynolds =

American politician and lawyer

Gerald Reynolds

Chair of the United States Commission on Civil Rights
- In office December 6, 2004 – 2011
- President: George W. Bush; Barack Obama
- Preceded by: Mary Frances Berry
- Succeeded by: Martin R. Castro

Assistant Secretary of Education for the Office for Civil Rights
- In office 2002–2003
- President: George W. Bush
- Preceded by: Norma V. Cantu
- Succeeded by: Stephanie J. Monroe

Personal details
- Born: 1964 (age 61–62)
- Party: Republican
- Education: York College (BA); Boston University (JD)

Gerald A. Reynolds (born 1964) is an American politician and lawyer who served as chairman of the United States Commission on Civil Rights from 2004 to 2011. A member of the Republican Party, he was appointed by President George W. Bush on December 6, 2004. He succeeded Mary Frances Berry and served a six-year term as chairman.

== Education ==
He received his Bachelor of Arts degree in history from York College and his Juris Doctor degree from Boston University School of Law, where he served on the editorial board of the American Journal of Law & Medicine.

== Career ==
Prior to his government work, he served as the president of the Center for New Black Leadership, and worked as a legal analyst for the Center for Equal Opportunity. He practiced law with Schatz & Schatz, Ribicoff & Kotkin, a firm based out of Connecticut. On March 29, 2002, Reynolds was appointed by Bush to the position of Assistant Secretary of Education for the Office for Civil Rights.

He later served as a deputy associate attorney general in the United States Department of Justice, providing legal advice on various matters to the United States Associate Attorney General. He has served on the national advisory board of Project 21, a program within the National Center for Public Policy Research, that seeks to provide a forum for conservatives within the black community. Since 2012, he has worked as general counsel, chief compliance officer, and corporate secretary at LG&E and KU Energy.

== Writing ==
Reynolds has written articles on public policy issues, which were published in various publications, including Black Family Today, The Dallas Morning News, The CQ Researcher, Orange Register, and The Washington Times. He edited a book on race within the criminal justice system.

Political offices
Preceded by Mary Frances Berry	Chairman of the United States Commission on Civil Rights; 2004–2011	Succeeded by Martin R. Castro
