= Mary Frances Berry =

American historian, lawyer and activist (born 1938)

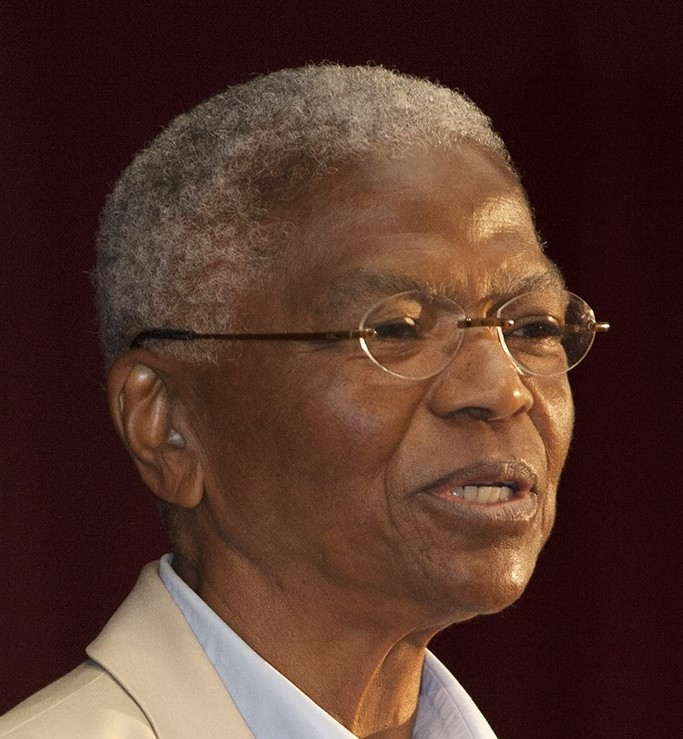
- Berry in 2014

Chair of the United States Commission on Civil Rights
- In office 1993–2004
- President: Bill Clinton; George W. Bush
- Preceded by: Arthur Fletcher
- Succeeded by: Gerald A. Reynolds

Personal details
- Born: Mary Frances Berry; February 17, 1938 (age 88) Nashville, Tennessee, U.S.
- Citizenship: American
- Parent(s): George Ford; Frances Berry
- Education: Howard University; University of Michigan
- Website: maryfrancesberry.com

Mary Frances Berry (born February 17, 1938) is an American historian, writer, lawyer, activist and professor who focuses on U.S. constitutional and legal, African-American history. Berry is the Geraldine R. Segal Professor of American Social Thought where she teaches American legal history at the Department of History, School of Arts & Sciences at the University of Pennsylvania. She is the former chairwoman of the United States Commission on Civil Rights. Previously, Berry was provost of the College of Behavioral and Social Science at University of Maryland, College Park, and was the first African American chancellor of the University of Colorado at Boulder.

== Early life and education ==
Berry was born in Nashville, Tennessee, the second of the three children of George Ford and Frances Berry (née Southall). Because of economic hardship and family circumstances, she and her older brother were placed in an orphanage for a time.

Berry attended Nashville's segregated schools. In 1956, she graduated with honors from Pearl High School. She attended Fisk University in Nashville, where her primary interests were philosophy, history, and chemistry. Berry transferred to Howard University, where in 1961 she received her B.A. In 1962, she received her M.A. from Howard. In 1966, Berry received a Ph.D. in American constitutional history from the University of Michigan. In 1970, she earned a J.D. from the University of Michigan Law School.

== Career ==
Berry spent seven years working at the University of Maryland, eventually becoming interim provost of the Division of Behavioral and Social Sciences. In 1976, she became chancellor of the University of Colorado in Boulder, Colorado, the first black woman to head a major research university.

In 1977, Berry took a leave of absence from the University of Colorado when President Jimmy Carter named her assistant secretary for education in the Department of Health, Education, and Welfare.

In 1980, Berry left the Department of Education to return to Howard University as a professor of history and law. Carter appointed her to the U.S. Civil Rights Commission, where during her tenure she became involved in legal battles with Carter's successor, Ronald Reagan. When Reagan attempted to remove her from the board, she successfully went to court to keep her seat. She clashed frequently on the commission with the Reagan-appointed chairman, Clarence M. Pendleton Jr. Pendleton tried to move the commission in line with Reagan's social and civil rights views and aroused the ire of liberals and feminists. He served from 1981 until his sudden death in 1988.

In 1984, Berry co-founded the Free South Africa Movement, dedicated to the abolition of apartheid in South Africa. She was one of three prominent Americans arrested at the South African Embassy in Washington the day before Thanksgiving; the timing was deliberate to ensure maximum news exposure.

In 1987, Berry took a tenured chair at the University of Pennsylvania, while continuing to serve on the Civil Rights Commission.

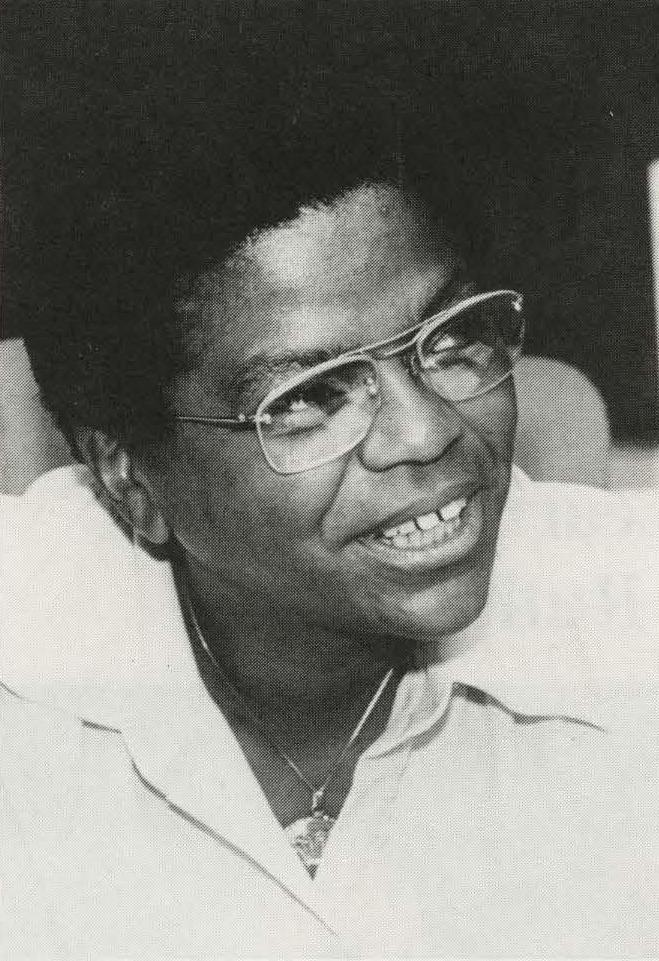
Berry circa 1988

In 1993, Berry's book The Politics of Parenthood: Child Care, Women's Rights, and the Myth of the Good Mother was published. Reviewing the book in The Christian Science Monitor, Laura Van Tuyl stated, "Berry presents a dispassionate history of the women's movement, day care, and home life, showing the persistent obstacles to economic and political power that have confronted women as a result of society's definition of them as 'mothers.' Her heavily footnoted chronology attributes the failure of the Equal Rights Amendment, the languishing of the women's movement in the '80s, and years of bickering over federal parental-leave and child care bills to an unwillingness to rethink gender roles." In 1993, Berry was also appointed chair of the Civil Rights Commission by President Bill Clinton, who reappointed her for another term in 1999.

Separately from her work on the Civil Rights Commission, Berry was named chair of the Pacifica Radio Foundation's National Board in June 1997. She drew controversy from listeners, programmers, and station staff, after she and the board attempted to modify programming in order to expand the listeners of the stations and to attract a more diverse audience. "White male hippies over 50," is how Berry described the programmers and audience of KPFA in Berkeley. Rumors of board actions involving the sale of flagship stations such as KPFA were widely circulated by the programmers. (Unlike most public service stations, Pacifica stations hold valuable high wattage licenses at commercial frequencies in major urban markets including New York City.) In 1999 she and Pacifica's Executive Director Lynn Chadwick fired the station's manager and issued a gag order, threatening to fire anyone else who worked at the station who spoke of their actions. Berry thereafter ordered a lockout of all KPFA personnel, in violation of station union agreements. She then proceeded to demand the imposition of racial preferences across the board at KPFA, though she refused to meet with minority staff people at the station, who mostly disagreed with her actions. Berry's actions in connection with Pacifica Radio brought protest from free speech groups such as the ACLU. She subsequently resigned from the Pacifica board.

She continued to serve as chair of the Civil Rights Commission. In 1999, Berry persuaded the Clinton administration to appoint Victoria Wilson, her editor at Alfred A. Knopf, to the commission. In 2001, she and the Democratic board members of the commission barred the seating of Peter Kirsanow, who had been appointed by President George W. Bush to replace Wilson on the commission. Berry and the Democratic bloc argued that Wilson was entitled to serve a full six-year term, but the Bush Administration contended that she had only been appointed to serve out the remainder of a previous member's term. Kirsanow sued, claiming Wilson's tenure had expired and he had been validly appointed. Wilson won in federal district court but ultimately lost on appeal in 2002, and the court ordered the seating of Kirsanow. The dispute determined which political party would have a majority of the board's members. Berry left office expiration of her term in late 2004 and was succeeded by Gerald A. Reynolds.

In 2009, Berry's ninth book was published, a history of the Civil Rights Commission. Reviewing it in The New York Times, Samuel G. Freedman wrote, "Reviewing a book is not reviewing a life. For her public service on behalf of racial justice, Mary Frances Berry deserves her many accolades. But on the evidence of 'And Justice for All,' she may have been the wrong person to tell a story that obviously matters to her so deeply."

== Leadership ==
- 1974–1976: University of Maryland College of Behavioral and Social Sciences, Provost
- 1976–1977: University of Colorado at Boulder, Chancellor
- 1977–1980: U.S. Department of Health and Human Services, Assistant Secretary for Education
- 1980–2004: U.S. Commission on Civil Rights, Member; Vice-Chairman; Chairman (1993–2004)
- 1987–present: University of Pennsylvania, Geraldine R. Segal Professor of American Social Thought
- 1997–2000: Pacifica Radio, Chairman of the Board
- 1990–1991: Organization of American Historians, President; Member
- American Historical Association, Member
- 2003: Woodhull Freedom Foundation, Co-Founder

== Awards and honors ==
- 1965: Civil War Roundtable Fellowship Award
- 1983: NAACP, Roy Wilkins Civil Rights Award
- 1983: NAACP, Image Award, both from NAACP
- 1985: Southern Christian Leadership Conference, Rosa Parks Award
- 1985: Congressional Black Caucus Foundation, President's Award
- 1986: Hubert H. Humphrey Civil Rights Award, 1986
- 1986: Ms., Woman of the Year
- 1987: National Council of Negro Women, Achievement Award
- 2008: National Center for Health Research, Foremother Award
- 2014: Organization of American Historians, Roy Rosenzweig Distinguished Service Award

== Selected works and publications ==
=== Selected works ===
- Berry, Mary Frances (1966). The Negro Soldier Movement and the Adoption of National Conscription, 1652–1865 (PhD). University of Michigan. OCLC 68276654.
- Berry, Mary Frances (1971). Black Resistance, White Law: A History of Constitutional Racism in America (1995 paperback ed.). New York: Appleton-Century-Crofts, Penguin Book. ISBN 978-1-101-65085-1. OCLC 1141945337.
- Berry, Mary Frances (1977). Military Necessity and Civil Rights Policy: Black Citizenship and the Constitution, 1861–1868. Port Washington, NY: Kennikat Press. OCLC 1150789699.
- Berry, Mary Frances (1978). Stability, Security, and Continuity: Mr. Justice Burton and Decision-Making in the Supreme Court, 1945–1958. Westport, CT: Greenwood Press. ISBN 978-0-837-19798-2. OCLC 3446993.
- Berry, Mary Frances; John W. Blassingame (1982). Long Memory: The Black Experience in America. New York: Oxford University Press. ISBN 978-0-195-02909-3. OCLC 6863123.
- Berry, Mary Frances (1986). Why ERA Failed: Politics, Women's Rights, and the Amending Process of the Constitution. Bloomington, IN: Indiana University Press. ISBN 978-0-253-20459-2. OCLC 17151156.
- Berry, Mary Frances (1993). The Politics of Parenthood: Child Care, Women's Rights, and the Myth of the Good Mother. New York: Penguin Books. ISBN 978-1-101-65145-2. OCLC 864007442.
- Berry, Mary Frances (1999). Pig Farmer's Daughter and Other Tales of American Justice: Episodes of Racism and Sexism in the Courts from 1865 to the Present. New York: Knopf. ISBN 978-0-679-43611-9. OCLC 39672030.
- Berry, Mary Frances (2005). My Face Is Black Is True: Callie House and the Struggle for Ex-Slave Reparations. New York: Alfred A. Knopf. ISBN 978-0-307-27705-3. OCLC 1031962695.
- Berry, Mary Frances (2009). And Justice for All: The United States Commission on Civil Rights and the Continuing Struggle for Freedom in America. New York: Alfred A. Knopf. ISBN 978-0-307-27123-5. OCLC 441342258.
- Berry, Mary Frances; Gottheimer, Josh; Obama, Barack (2010). Power in Words: The Stories Behind Barack Obama's Speeches, from the State House to the White House. Boston: Beacon Press. ISBN 978-0-807-00104-2. OCLC 730268883.
- Berry, Mary Frances (2016). Five Dollars and a Pork Chop Sandwich: Vote Buying and the Corruption of Democracy. Boston: Beacon Press. ISBN 978-0-807-07640-8. OCLC 965629095.
- Berry, Mary Frances (2018). History Teaches Us to Resist: How Progressive Movements Have Succeeded in Challenging Times. Boston: Beacon Press. ISBN 978-0-807-00546-0. OCLC 987996199.

=== Selected publications ===
- Berry, Mary Frances (July 2006). "In Search of Callie House and the Origins of the Modern Reparations Movement". The Journal of African American History. 91 (3): 323–327. doi:10.1086/JAAHv91n3p323. OCLC 7794024095. S2CID 141315901.
- Berry, Mary Frances (April 15, 2015). "Letter to Governor Bush from Chairperson Mary Frances Berry March 8, 2001". The Black Scholar. 31 (2): 6–7. doi:10.1080/00064246.2001.11431134. OCLC 5948868723. S2CID 147242720.
- Berry, Mary Frances (April 15, 2015). "Status Report on Probe of Election Practices in Florida During The 2000 Presidential Election". The Black Scholar. 31 (2): 2–5. doi:10.1080/00064246.2001.11431133. OCLC 95271155. S2CID 147152542.
- Berry, Mary Frances (September 8, 2016). "Du Bois as Social Activist: Why We Are Not Saved". The Annals of the American Academy of Political and Social Science. 568 (1): 100–110. doi:10.1177/000271620056800108. OCLC 366119768. S2CID 143404067.

Political offices
Preceded by Arthur Fletcher	Chairman of the United States Commission on Civil Rights; 1993–2004	Succeeded by Gerald A. Reynolds
