= United States Commission on Civil Rights =

Government agency

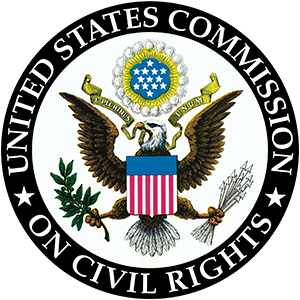

Agency overview
- Formed: September 9, 1957; 69 years ago
- Headquarters: Washington, D.C.
- Agency executive: Peter Kirsanow, chair
- Key document: Civil Rights Act of 1957
- Website: www.usccr.gov

The United States Commission on Civil Rights (CCR) is a bipartisan, independent commission of the United States federal government, created by the Civil Rights Act of 1957 during the Eisenhower administration, which is charged with the responsibility for investigating, reporting on, and making recommendations concerning civil rights issues in the United States. Specifically, the CCR investigates allegations of discrimination based on race, sex, national origin, disability. In 2023, Rochelle Mercedes Garza was appointed to serve as chair by President Joe Biden.

Pursuant to 42 U.S.C. 1975d, all statutory authority for the commission terminated on September 30, 1996, and Congress has not passed new legislation, but has continued to pass appropriations.

== Commissioners ==
The commission is composed of eight commissioners. Four are appointed by the President of the United States, two by the president pro tempore of the Senate (upon the recommendations of the Senate majority leader and minority leader), and two by the speaker of the House of Representatives (upon the recommendations of the House majority leader and minority leader).

As of December 2022, the members of the commission are:

Presidential appointees (2D, 2R):

- Stephen Gilchrist (R) – chairman and CEO, South Carolina African American Chamber of Commerce (appointed by President Donald Trump, May 2020).
- J. Christian Adams (R) – President and General Counsel of the Public Interest Legal Foundation (appointed by President Trump, August 2020)
- Rochelle Garza (D) – Serves as Chair of the Commission. Attorney and President of the Texas Civil Rights Project (appointed by President Joe Biden, March 2023)
- Victoria Nourse (D) – Ralph Whitworth Professor of Law at Georgetown University Law School (appointed by President Joe Biden, March 2023)

Senate appointees (1D, 1I):

- Gail Heriot (I) – University of San Diego law professor (first appointed by Senate President Pro Tempore Robert Byrd, February 2007; re-appointed by Senate President Pro Tempore Patrick Leahy, December 2013).
- Glenn Magpantay (D) – Civil rights attorney and law professor, Chair of the LGBT Committee of the Asian American Bar Association of New York (appointed by Senate Majority Leader Chuck Schumer, March 2023)

House appointees (1D, 1R):

- Peter N. Kirsanow (R) – Partner at Benesch, Friedlander, Coplan & Arnoff in Cleveland, Ohio; former member of the National Labor Relations Board (first appointed by President George W. Bush, December 2001, reappointed December 2006; reappointed by Speaker Dennis Hastert, December 2013; reappointed by House Majority Leader Steny Hoyer, December 2019).
- Mondaire Jones (D) – Former U.S. representative for New York's 17th Congressional District (first appointed by Speaker Nancy Pelosi, December 2022)

== History ==
=== Creation and early history ===
The commission was created by the Civil Rights Act of 1957, which was signed into law by President Dwight D. Eisenhower in response to a recommendation by an ad hoc President's Committee on Civil Rights. In calling for a permanent commission, that committee stated:

In a democratic society, the systematic, critical review of social needs and public policy is a fundamental necessity. This is especially true of a field like civil rights, where the problems are enduring, and range widely [and where] ... a temporary, sporadic approach can never finally solve these problems.

Nowhere in the federal government in there an agency charged with the continuous appraisal of the status of civil rights, and the efficiency of the machinery with which we hope to improve that status. ... A permanent Commission could perform an invaluable function by collecting data. ... Ultimately, this would make possible a periodic audit of the extent to which our civil rights are secure. ... [The Commission should also] serve[] as a clearing house and focus of coordination for the many private, state, and local agencies working in the civil rights field, [and thus] would be invaluable to them and to the federal government.

A permanent Commission on Civil Rights should point all of its work toward regular reports which would include recommendations for action in ensuing periods. It should lay plans for dealing with broad civil rights problems. ... It should also investigate and make recommendations with respect to special civil rights problems.

As then-Senator and Majority Leader Lyndon B. Johnson put it, the commission's task is to "gather facts instead of charges. ... [I]t can sift out the truth from the fancies; and it can return with recommendations which will be of assistance to reasonable men."

Since the 1957 Act, the commission has been re-authorized and re-configured by the U.S. Commission on Civil Rights Acts of 1983 and 1991 and the Civil Rights Commission Amendments Act of 1994.

Soon after the passage of the 1957 Act, the then-six-member, bipartisan Commission, consisting of John A. Hannah, President of Michigan State University; Robert Storey, Dean of the Southern Methodist University Law School; Father Theodore Hesburgh, President of the University of Notre Dame; John Stewart Battle, former governor of Virginia; Ernest Wilkins, a Department of Labor attorney; and Doyle E. Carlton, former governor of Florida, set about to assemble a record.

Their first project was to assess the administration of voter registration and elections in Montgomery, Alabama. But they immediately ran into resistance. Circuit judge George C. Wallace, who was elected as governor in support of white supremacy, ordered voter registration records to be impounded. "They are not going to get the records," he said. "And if any agent of the Civil Rights Commission comes down to get them, they will be locked up. ... I repeat, I will jail any Civil Rights Commission agent who attempts to get the records." The hearing went forward with no shortage of evidence. Witness after witness testified to inappropriate interference with his or her right to vote. The commissioners spent the night at Maxwell Air Base, because all the city's hotels were segregated.

From there, the commission went on to hold hearings on the implementation of Brown v. Board of Education in Nashville, Tennessee and on housing discrimination in Atlanta, Chicago and New York. The facts gathered in these and other hearings along with the commission's recommendations were presented not just to Congress and the President but the American people generally, and they become part of the foundation upon which the Civil Rights Act of 1960, the Civil Rights Act of 1964, the Voting Rights Act of 1965 and the Fair Housing Act of 1968 were built.

A revolution in public opinion occurred during the late 1950s and early 1960s on issues of civil rights. The activities and reports of the Commission on Civil Rights contributed to that change. In 1956, the year before the 1957 Act, less than half of white Americans agreed with the statement, "White students and Negro students should go to the same schools." By 1963, the year before the 1964 Act, that figure had jumped to 62%. In 1956, a healthy majority of white Americans—60%—opposed "separate sections for Negroes on streetcars and buses." By 1963, the number had grown to 79% opposed—an overwhelming majority. Even in the South, minds were being changed. In 1956, 27% of Southern whites opposed separate sections on public transportation for blacks and whites. By 1963, the number had become a majority of 52%.

The change in views about the desirability of a federal law was even more dramatic. As late as July 1963, 49 percent of the total population favored a federal law that would give "all persons, Negro as well as white, the right to be served in public places such as hotels, restaurants, and similar establishments," and 42 percent were opposed. By September of the same year, a majority of 54 percent was in favor, and 38 percent opposed. In February 1964, support had climbed to 61 percent and opposition had declined to 31 percent.

In 1964, Frankie Muse Freeman became the first woman and first African-American woman to serve on the United States Commission on Civil Rights.

=== Reagan and Clinton administrations ===
In 1977 the commission produced the report Sex Bias in the U.S. Code. In 1981 President Ronald Reagan, looking to move the commission in a more conservative direction, appointed Clarence M. Pendleton, Jr., as the first black chairman of the commission. A Howard University graduate, he was a conservative who opposed affirmative action and many of the commission's activities. Pendleton reduced its staff and programs.

In 1983, Reagan attempted to fire three members of the commission. They sued the administration in federal court to stay on. The authorizing legislation stated that a president could only fire a commissioner for "misbehavior in office", and it was clear that the terminations were the result of disagreements over policy. A compromise brokered in the Senate resulted in the current hybrid group of eight, half appointed by the president and half by the Congress, with six-year terms that do not expire with the inauguration of a new president. Since that time the commission has struggled to remain independent, and its agenda has oscillated between liberal and conservative aims as factions among its members have ebbed and waned.

In 1990, Congress relied on a commission report to enact the Americans with Disabilities Act. (ADA)

=== 21st century ===
The commission became increasingly polarized under the George W. Bush administration, as conservatives –including Republican appointees on the commission itself – argued that it no longer served any useful purpose and that it conducted partisan investigations meant to embarrass Republicans. After 2004, when Bush appointed two conservative commissioners who had recently canceled their Republican Party registrations to the two "independent" seats, obtaining a six-member conservative majority bloc, the commission dramatically scaled back its activities and canceled several ongoing investigations.

On September 5, 2007, Commissioner Gail Heriot testified about the agency's value on the 50th anniversary of the passage of the Civil Rights Act of 1957. Heriot told the Senate Committee on the Judiciary:

If the value of a federal agency could be calculated on a per dollar basis, it would not surprise me to find the Commission on Civil Rights to be among the best investments Congress ever made. My back-of-the-envelope calculation is that the Commission now accounts for less than 1/2000th of 1 percent of the federal budget; back in the late 1950s its size would have been roughly similar. And yet its impact has been dramatic.

In 2008, President George W. Bush announced that he would oppose the proposed Native Hawaiian Government Reorganization Act shortly after the commission issued a report recommending rejection of the bill. In 2018 the commission reversed its position in a report evaluating the federal government's efforts to meet its trust obligations to Native Americans and Native Hawaiians.

During the Barack Obama administration, this conservative bloc reversed its position and began using the commission as a vigorous advocate for conservative interpretations of civil rights issues, such as opposition to the Voting Rights Act and the expansion of federal hate crimes laws. In 2010, Commissioner Abigail Thernstrom, a Republican appointee generally considered part of the commission's conservative bloc, criticized her colleagues' investigation into the New Black Panther Party voter intimidation case, describing it as motivated by a partisan "fantasy ... [that] they could bring Eric Holder down and really damage [President Obama]" and arguing that only "a moron" could believe the commission's theory that Obama appointees had ordered DoJ attorneys not to protect the voting rights of white people. In October 2010, Michael Yaki, one of the two Democratic commissioners, walked out of a meeting in protest. In doing so, Yaki deprived the panel of a quorum and delayed a vote on a draft report, which Yaki claimed, is unfairly biased against the Obama administration. Yaki described the panel as a "kangaroo court".

President Obama eventually appointed two staunch liberals to the commission in the last days of his administration, keeping the commission to six Democratic and two Republican appointees. In June 2017 the commission voted unanimously to begin a wide-ranging investigation of the Trump administration's civil rights enforcement practices, and 6–2 along party lines to express their concern about the administration's actions.

In 2023, The commission investigated the Federal Response to Anti-Asian Racism in the United States. The commission examined three main areas: 1) national trends and data regarding the rise of hate incidents and hate crimes against members of Asian communities; 2) local and state law enforcement's prevention and reporting practices regarding hate crimes; and 3) federal efforts and policies that encourage greater participation in reporting hate crime incidents, as well as prosecution and enforcement efforts to prevent hate crimes.

In releasing the report, Commissioner Glenn Magpantay noted that the report was "the United States of America's official, congressionally authorized, report on what's been happening to [the Asian American] community since [President Trump] dubbed COVID19 as the 'China Virus' inflicting people with the 'Kung Flu'. Words matter, as this report shows."

In 2024, U.S. Commission on Civil Rights released a report on "The Civil Rights Implications of the Federal Use of Facial Recognition Technology."

=== List of chairs, 1958–present ===
- John A. Hannah, 1958–1969
- Theodore Hesburgh, 1969–1972
- J. Stephen Horn, 1972–1974 (Acting)
- Arthur S. Flemming, 1974–1981
- Clarence M. Pendleton Jr., 1981–1988
- William B. Allen, 1988–1989
- Arthur Fletcher, 1990–1993
- Mary Frances Berry, 1993–2004
- Gerald A. Reynolds, 2004–2011
- Martin R. Castro, 2011–2016
- Catherine E. Lhamon, 2016–2021
- Norma V. Cantu, 2021–2023
- Rochelle Garza, 2023–2025
- Peter Kirsanow, 2025–

== Commission structure ==
The eight commissioners serve six-year staggered terms. Four are appointed by the president, two by the president pro tempore of the Senate and two by the speaker of the House of Representatives. No more than four commissioners can be of the same political party. In addition, neither the two Senate appointees nor the two House appointees may be of the same political party. With the concurrence of a majority of the commission's members, the president designates a chair and a vice chair. The staff director is also appointed by the president with the concurrence of a majority of the commissioners.

The commission has appointed 51 state advisory committees (SACs) to function as the "eyes and ears" of the commission in their respective locations. The commission's enabling legislation authorizes the creation of these SACs and directs the commission to establish at least one advisory committee in every state and the District of Columbia. Each state committee has a charter that enables it to operate and identifies its members. Each charter is valid for a term of two years, and the committee terminates if the charter is not renewed by the commission. Each committee has a minimum of eleven members. The SACs are supported by regional offices whose primary function is to assist them in their planning, fact-finding, and reporting activities. Like the commission, the SACs produce written reports that are based on fact-finding hearings and other public meetings.

== Commission operations ==
The commission studies alleged discrimination based on race, color, religion, sex, age, disability, or national origin. It also studies alleged deprivations of voting rights and discrimination in the administration of justice. Though the commission has no enforcement powers, its commissioners try to enhance the enforcement of federal civil rights laws. Its recommendations often lead to action in Congress.

Commissioners hold monthly daylong meetings, including six briefings on subjects, chosen by the commissioners, that involve possible discrimination. Ahead of these meetings, commission staff prepares reports on those subjects and schedules appearances by witnesses. Each year the commission drafts recommendations that are sent to Congress by September 30.

In 2021, the U.S. Commission on Civil Rights established five new advisory committees in the U.S. Virgin Islands, Puerto Rico, Northern Mariana Islands, Guam, and American Samoa.

U.S. Commission on Civil Rights state and territorial advisory committees provide independent advice and recommendations to the commission about civil rights matters within each committee's particular geographical jurisdiction. These committees operate as Federal Advisory Committees under the Federal Advisory Committee Act and under the U.S. Commission on Civil Rights' jurisdiction, policies, and procedures for its advisory committees.
