= Norma V. Cantu =

American lawyer

Norma Cantú
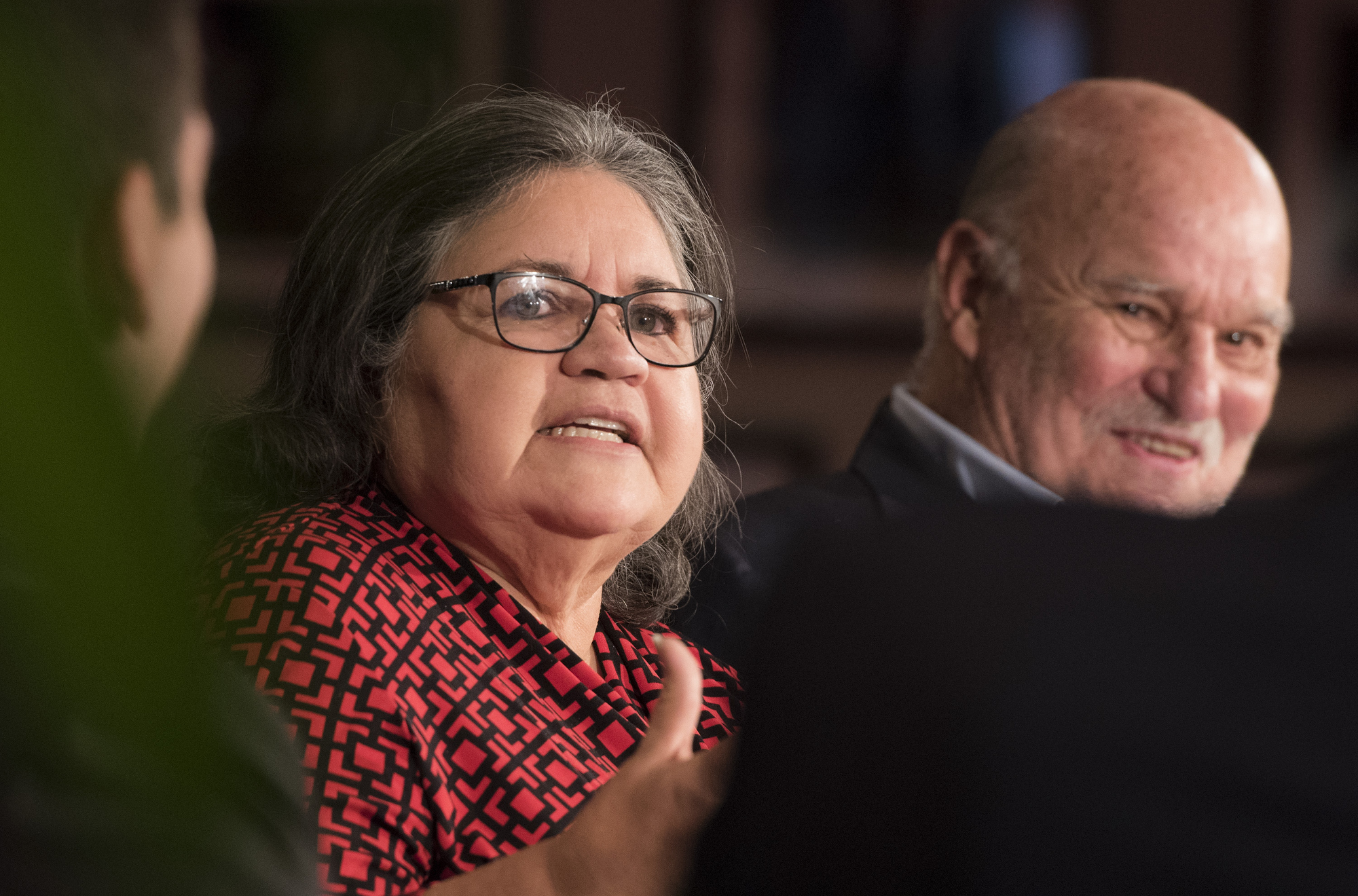
- Cantú in 2017

Chair of the United States Commission on Civil Rights
- In office January 20, 2021 – March 2023
- President: Joe Biden
- Preceded by: Catherine E. Lhamon
- Succeeded by: Rochelle Mercedes Garza

Assistant Secretary of Education for the Office for Civil Rights
- In office May 24, 1993 – January 20, 2001
- President: Bill Clinton
- Preceded by: Michael L. Williams
- Succeeded by: Gerald A. Reynolds

Personal details
- Born: November 2, 1954 (age 71) Brownsville, Texas, U.S.
- Education: University of Texas–Pan American (B.A.); Harvard Law School (JD)

Norma V. Cantú (born November 2, 1954) is an American civil rights lawyer and educator. From 2021 to 2023, she served as chair of the United States Commission on Civil Rights, the first Latina to hold the position.

She previously served as a professor of law and education at the University of Texas at Austin. She served as the Assistant Secretary of Education for the Office for Civil Rights under President Bill Clinton and as regional counsel for the Mexican-American Legal Defense and Educational Fund.

== Early life ==
Cantú was born in 1954 in Brownsville, Texas, a third generation Mexican-American. She was the eldest of six children. She graduated from Brownsville High School (now Homer Hanna High School) in 1971, one of only 750 students who graduated out of a class of 2,000. She received her B.A., graduating summa cum laude, from the University of Texas–Pan American in 1973 at the age of 19. Cantú started her career as an English teacher in Brownsville in 1974 before receiving her J.D. degree from Harvard Law School in 1977 when she was 22 years old.

== Career ==
After graduating from law school, she worked with the Nursing Home Task Force of the Texas Attorney General's office and as an English teacher in San Antonio. She joined the Mexican American Legal Defense and Educational Fund (MALDEF) in 1979, serving as a trial and appellate lawyer in federal and state courts in class action impact civil rights cases. In 1983, she was named the National Director of the Carnegie Endowment-funded Education, Litigation and Advocacy Project at MALDEF and also worked as a Staff Attorney on the Chicana Rights Project. In 1985, she became the regional counsel and education director of MALDEF, overseeing its offices in Texas, Colorado, and New Mexico. That same year, she was named as one of the "100 Most Influential Hispanics in the U.S." by Hispanic Business Magazine. While at MALDEF she litigated significant cases affecting educational funding, disability rights, student disciplinary policies, access to special services for English-language learners, and racially hostile environments. She successfully litigated Edgewood v. Kirby, a case concerning disparities in public school funding in the state.

=== Public service ===
On March 5, 1993, President Bill Clinton nominated Cantú to serve as the Assistant Secretary of Education for the Office for Civil Rights. She was sworn in on May 24, 1993.

She served the nation for eight years in this capacity, where she oversaw a staff of approximately 850 in implementing governmental policy for civil rights in American education. Within the first two years, her office increased the number of illegal discrimination complaints resolved by 20%; more than a third of the cases were disposed of without adversarial proceedings based on voluntary corrective action. By her final year in office, the number of cases resolved each year had risen almost another 20%.

In 1996, she interpreted Title IX of the Education Amendments of 1972, the federal statute that was created to prohibit sex discrimination in education programs that receive federal financial assistance, as requiring schools to offer "proportional opportunity" for female and male athletes. Her work on Title IX resulted in her being named to the Women's Institute on Sports and Education Hall of Fame on September 27, 1996, and as one of the "50 Most Influential People in College Sports" by College Sports Magazine.

In November 2020, Cantú was named a volunteer member of the Joe Biden presidential transition Agency Review Team to support transition efforts related to the United States Department of Education. From 2021 to 2023, she served as chair of the United States Commission on Civil Rights, the first Latina to hold the position.

=== Academia ===
Since 2001, Cantú has served as a visiting professor of law and education at the University of Texas at Austin. While at the university, she has developed and taught courses on disability law, school reform, performance management in education, politics and policy in education, and the intersection of law and policy in education.

In 2002, Cantú co-founded the Mexican-American Legislative Leadership Foundation, a not-for-profit organization to encourage students to gain experience on staff to the Texas Legislature. She currently serves on its board.

In 2004, the American Bar Association's Commission on Racial and Ethnic Diversity in the Profession honored Cantú with its Spirit of Excellence Award for "opening doors for many and preventing other doors from closing."

Political offices
Preceded by Michael L. Williams	Assistant Secretary of Education for the Office for Civil Rights; 1993–2001	Succeeded by Gerald A. Reynolds
