= Dear Colleague letter =

Letter sent by one member of a legislative body to all fellow members

A Dear Colleague letter is a letter sent by one member of a legislative body to all fellow members, usually describing a new bill and asking for cosponsors or seeking to influence the recipients' votes on an issue. They can also be used for administrative matters, such as announcing elevator repairs, or informing colleagues of events connected with congressional business, or to set or modify procedures.

== Description ==
A typical "Dear Colleague letter" is written by staff members and will be approved by a Legislative Director as it represents a significant political communication by the member. Dear Colleague letters are short, typically no longer than 500 words.

== Use ==
The use of such letters dates back to at least to the early 20th century. Electronic Dear Colleague letters are now disseminated via in-house networks in the US House and US Senate. Several agencies of the US government have also made use of "Dear Colleague" letters to disseminate information to the public and issue statements on public policy, including those of the Department of Transportation, the Department of Health and Human Services, and the Department of Education. In UK government agencies such as the Department of Health, Dear Colleague letters convey general information, policy updates or a request for information or action.
