= 1972 United States presidential election in Massachusetts =

- November 7, 1972
- Turnout: 80.76%

Nominee	George McGovern	Richard Nixon
Party	Democratic	Republican
Home state	South Dakota	California
Running mate	Sargent Shriver	Spiro Agnew
Electoral vote	14	0
Popular vote	1,332,540	1,112,078
Percentage	54.20%	45.23%

McGovern
40–50%
50–60%
60–70%
70–80%
Nixon
40–50%
50–60%
60–70%
70–80%
80–90%
President before election
Richard Nixon
Republican
Elected President
Richard Nixon
Republican

The 1972 United States presidential election in Massachusetts took place on November 7, 1972, as part of the 1972 United States presidential election, which was held throughout all 50 states and D.C. Voters chose 14 representatives, or electors to the Electoral College, who voted for president and vice president.

Massachusetts voted for the Democratic nominee, Senator George McGovern of South Dakota, over incumbent Republican President Richard Nixon of California. McGovern's running mate was U.S. Ambassador Sargent Shriver of Maryland, who had replaced Senator Thomas Eagleton during the campaign, while Nixon ran with incumbent Vice President Spiro Agnew of Maryland.

McGovern carried Massachusetts with 54.20% of the vote to Nixon's 45.23%, a Democratic victory margin of 8.97 percentage points (19.82% more votes than Nixon). In the midst of a massive nationwide Republican landslide in which Richard Nixon had carried 49 states, Massachusetts proved to be the only state in the nation that would cast its electoral votes for George McGovern, joined by the District of Columbia. McGovern also carried the state by a surprisingly comfortable nine-point margin, making the state 32% more Democratic than the national average in the 1972 election.

McGovern, a staunch liberal Democrat best known for his strong principled opposition to the Vietnam War, was painted by the Nixon campaign as an extremist too far to the left of the American mainstream at the time, and this paid off in delivering Nixon a nationwide re-election landslide. Prior to 1972, Massachusetts had been a Democratic-leaning state since 1928, and a Democratic stronghold since 1960. But McGovern's comfortable victory in 1972 still stands out, as many other traditional Democratic strongholds abandoned the Democrats in 1972. For example, Nixon took neighboring Rhode Island by six points, even though it normally voted similarly to Massachusetts. J. Anthony Lukas noted that many New Yorkers felt that Ted Kennedy's outsize money and influence in Massachusetts played a major role in keeping the state in the Democratic column, summing up this explanation simply as "Teddy did it". Kennedy was also the brother-in-law of Democratic vice presidential nominee Shriver.

To date, this is the last time that the towns of Deerfield, Gill, Monterey, Oak Bluffs, Pelham, Tisbury, Williamsburg, and Williamstown have voted Republican.

== Results ==
1972 United States presidential election in Massachusetts
Party	Candidate	Votes	Percentage	Electoral votes
Democratic	George McGovern	1,332,540	54.20%	14
Republican	Richard Nixon (inc.)	1,112,078	45.23%	0
Socialist Workers	Linda Jenness	10,600	0.43%	0
American Independent	John G. Schmitz (Write-in)	2,877	0.12%	0
Socialist Labor	Louis Fisher (Write-in)	129	0.01%	0
People's	Benjamin Spock (Write-in)	101	0.00%	0
Communist	Gus Hall (Write-in)	46	0.00%	0
Libertarian	John G. Hospers (Write-in)	43	0.00%	0
Write-ins	Scattered (Other write-ins)	342	0.01%	0
Totals		2,458,756	100.00%	14
Voter Turnout (Voting age/Registered)				62%/79%

=== Results by county ===
County	George McGovern Democratic		Richard Nixon Republican		Various candidates Other parties		Margin		Total votes cast
County	#	%	#	%	#	%	#	%	Total votes cast
Barnstable	22,636	38.08%	36,340	61.14%	466	0.78%	-13,704	-23.06%	59,442
Berkshire	35,391	53.39%	30,380	45.83%	513	0.78%	5,011	7.56%	66,284
Bristol	103,163	54.65%	84,390	44.71%	1,215	0.64%	18,773	9.94%	188,768
Dukes	2,001	46.15%	2,312	53.32%	23	0.53%	-311	-7.27%	4,336
Essex	157,324	52.96%	138,040	46.47%	1,719	0.57%	19,284	6.49%	297,083
Franklin	11,968	42.35%	16,088	56.93%	202	0.72%	-4,120	-14.58%	28,258
Hampden	94,945	52.13%	86,164	47.31%	1,024	0.56%	8,781	4.82%	182,133
Hampshire	28,572	53.25%	24,529	45.72%	553	1.03%	4,043	7.53%	53,654
Middlesex	345,343	55.91%	269,064	43.56%	3,244	0.53%	76,279	12.35%	617,651
Nantucket	952	40.00%	1,418	59.58%	10	0.42%	-466	-19.58%	2,380
Norfolk	150,732	52.57%	134,459	46.89%	1,558	0.54%	16,273	5.68%	286,749
Plymouth	69,124	47.32%	76,062	52.07%	878	0.61%	-6,938	-4.75%	146,064
Suffolk	166,250	65.76%	85,272	33.73%	1,299	0.51%	80,978	32.03%	252,821
Worcester	144,139	52.77%	127,560	46.70%	1,428	0.53%	16,579	6.07%	273,127
Totals	1,332,540	54.20%	1,112,078	45.23%	14,138	0.57%	220,462	8.97%	2,458,756

==== Counties flipped from Democratic to Republican ====
- Plymouth

=== Results by congressional district ===
McGovern won 11 of 12 congressional districts, including three that elected Republicans. Nixon won one that elected a Democrat (the 12th district). The results below show the percentage of the two-party vote share won by each candidate and do not account for third party votes.

District	Nixon	McGovern	Representative
1st	48.8%	51.2%	Silvio O. Conte
2nd	48.2%	51.8%	Edward Boland
3rd	45.9%	54.1%	Robert Drinan
3rd	45.9%	54.1%	Harold Donohue
4th	44.3%	55.7%	Harold Donohue
4th	44.3%	55.7%	Robert Drinan
5th	47.0%	53.0%	F. Bradford Morse
5th	47.0%	53.0%	Paul W. Cronin
6th	47.2%	52.8%	Michael J. Harrington
7th	42.9%	57.1%	Torbert Macdonald
8th	33.9%	66.1%	Tip O'Neill
9th	40.6%	59.4%	Louise Day Hicks
9th	40.6%	59.4%	Joe Moakley
10th	49.6%	50.4%	Margaret Heckler
11th	43.4%	56.6%	James Burke
12th	51.8%	48.2%	Hastings Keith
12th	51.8%	48.2%	Gerry Studds

== Analysis ==
On the county map, McGovern carried 9 of the state's 14 counties, including the most heavily populated parts of the state. The state's capital and largest city, Boston, would prove to be a McGovern stronghold; voters in Suffolk County, where Boston is located, cast 66% of the vote for McGovern. Boston is one of the few areas in the country where McGovern actually outperformed Jimmy Carter’s performance four years later in 1976; while Carter won narrow popular and electoral victories nationally, he carried Suffolk County with only 61%. On the other hand, despite Nixon's loss in the state and though Ronald Reagan would carry the state twice, this election remains the last time Dukes County, which had never voted Democratic before Lyndon B. Johnson’s landslide in 1964, has voted Republican.

The results in 1972 made Massachusetts the only state which Richard Nixon never carried in any of his three presidential campaigns, although it voted for Nixon when he was Dwight Eisenhower's running mate in 1952 and 1956. It voted for its native son John F. Kennedy when he defeated Nixon in 1960, and Hubert Humphrey when he lost to Nixon in 1968. This was also the first time in history that a Republican president was elected twice without ever carrying Massachusetts at least once, a feat that has since been repeated twice, in 2004 and 2024. Nixon was the first president to win two terms without carrying the state since Andrew Jackson in 1828 and 1832. As of 2024, this election marks only the second of three times (after 1852 and 1980) that Massachusetts has not voted for the same candidate as neighboring Rhode Island.

=== "Don't blame me! I'm from Massachusetts" ===
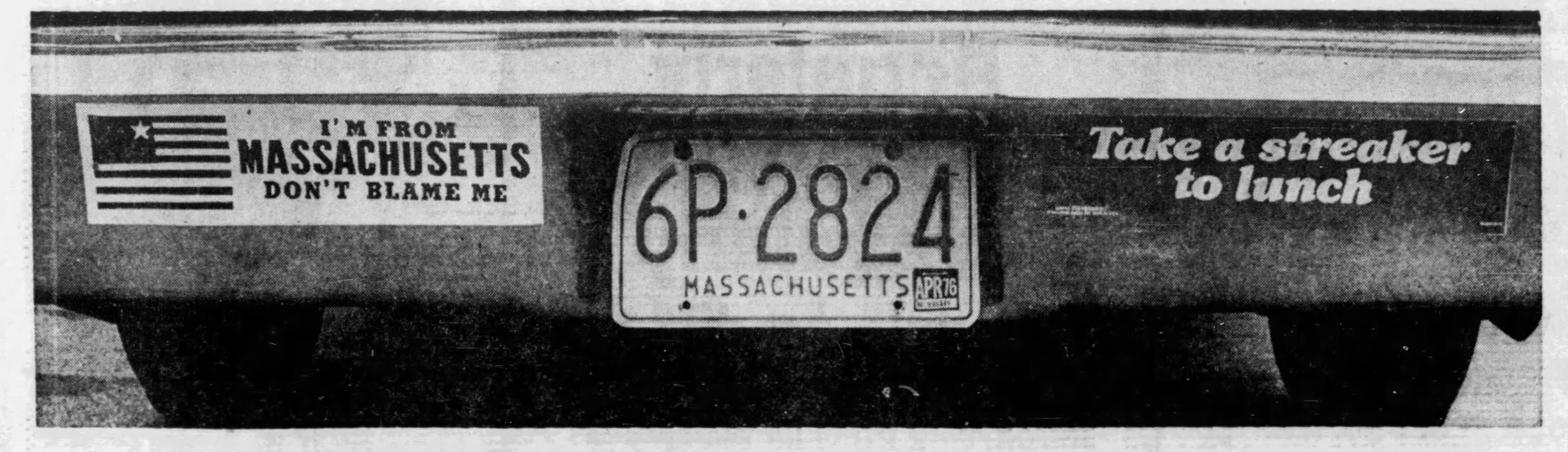
A car with an 'I'm From Massachusetts, Don't Blame Me' bumper sticker in 1974.

After Nixon was re-elected, he would later resign only a year and a half into his second term due to his involvement in the Watergate scandal and the illegal activities he committed. After the Watergate scandal broke and Nixon resigned due to criminal activity, bumper stickers with the words "Don't blame me! I'm from Massachusetts" (and variants such as "Massachusetts - We'd Rather Be Right") became a symbol of the sentiment felt by Massachusetts residents, serving as a proverbial "I told you so" to the 49 states that supported Nixon's re-election.

== See also ==
- 1972 United States presidential election in the District of Columbia, the only other place that voted Democratic in the 1972 presidential election.
- 1984 United States presidential election in Minnesota, the only state to vote Democratic in 1984, like Massachusetts was in 1972.
- United States presidential elections in Massachusetts
