= 1972 United States presidential election in New Jersey =

- November 7, 1972
- Turnout: 84.41% (▼2.40%)

Nominee	Richard Nixon	George McGovern
Party	Republican	Democratic
Home state	California	South Dakota
Running mate	Spiro Agnew	Sargent Shriver
Electoral vote	17	0
Popular vote	1,845,502	1,102,211
Percentage	61.57%	36.77%
County results
Nixon
50–60%
60–70%
70–80%
President before election
Richard Nixon
Republican
Elected President
Richard Nixon
Republican

The 1972 United States presidential election in New Jersey took place on November 7, 1972. All 50 states and the District of Columbia were part of the 1972 United States presidential election. Voters chose 17 electors to the Electoral College, which selected the president and vice president.

New Jersey was won by the Republican nominees, incumbent President Richard Nixon of California and his running mate incumbent Vice President Spiro Agnew of Maryland. Nixon and Agnew defeated the Democratic nominees, Senator George McGovern of South Dakota and his running mate United States Ambassador Sargent Shriver of Maryland.

Nixon carried New Jersey with 61.57 percent of the vote to McGovern's 36.77 percent, a margin of 24.80 points.

Nixon swept every county in New Jersey, including even traditional Democratic strongholds like Essex County, Mercer County, and Hudson County. Nixon's unique nationwide appeal to working-class Democrats in 1972 was most evident in his performance in Hudson County; the traditionally heavily Democratic county, which Nixon had lost decisively with less than forty percent of the vote in both 1960 and 1968, went to Nixon in 1972 by a 60–39 margin. This remains the last election in which a Republican presidential nominee has won Essex County, although it was still McGovern's strongest, only narrowly going to Nixon by a 50–48 margin. Mercer County was the second-closest, with Nixon winning it, 52–47. Nixon's strongest county was rural Sussex County, where he received 74 percent of the vote.

New Jersey in this era was a swing state with a slight Republican lean, and this pattern continued with the results of 1972. In the midst of a nationwide Republican landslide, New Jersey voted basically how the nation voted, its result being 1.6% more Republican than the national average.

This was the third time in five presidential elections (1956–72) that the winning candidate won each of New Jersey's counties in an election, having also happened in 1956 and 1964. It had only happened once before, when Warren G. Harding achieved it in 1920 and as of 2024, this is the last time that any presidential candidate has won all of New Jersey's counties.

== Results ==
1972 United States presidential election in New Jersey
Party	Candidate	Votes	Percentage	Electoral votes
Republican	Richard Nixon (incumbent)	1,845,502	61.57%	17
Democratic	George McGovern	1,102,211	36.77%	0
American	John G. Schmitz	34,378	1.15%	0
People's	Benjamin Spock	5,355	0.18%	0
Socialist Labor	Louis Fisher	4,544	0.15%	0
Socialist Workers	Linda Jenness	2,233	0.07%	0
America First	John Mahalchik	1,743	0.06%	0
Communist	Gus Hall	1,263	0.04%	0
(Write-In)	John Hospers	89	0.003%	0
Totals		2,997,318	100.0%	17
Voter Turnout (Voting age/Registered)				60%/82%

=== Results by county ===
County	Richard Nixon Republican		George McGovern Democratic		John G. Schmitz American		Various candidates Other parties		Margin		Total votes cast
County	#	%	#	%	#	%	#	%	#	%	Total votes cast
Atlantic	45,667	59.54%	28,203	36.77%	1,373	1.79%	1,457	1.90%	17,464	22.77%	76,700
Bergen	285,458	65.34%	147,155	33.68%	2,985	0.68%	1,296	0.30%	138,303	31.66%	436,894
Burlington	70,805	61.97%	41,520	36.34%	1,485	1.30%	450	0.39%	29,285	25.63%	114,260
Camden	111,935	58.85%	75,202	39.54%	2,313	1.22%	757	0.40%	36,733	19.31%	190,207
Cape May	22,621	70.54%	8,729	27.22%	564	1.76%	155	0.48%	13,892	43.32%	32,069
Cumberland	26,409	58.18%	18,692	41.18%	229	0.50%	62	0.14%	7,717	17.00%	45,392
Essex	170,036	50.17%	161,270	47.59%	6,257	1.85%	1,325	0.39%	8,766	2.58%	338,888
Gloucester	44,806	62.92%	25,509	35.82%	771	1.08%	123	0.17%	19,297	27.10%	71,209
Hudson	136,895	60.15%	87,977	38.65%	1,669	0.73%	1,059	0.47%	48,918	21.50%	227,600
Hunterdon	21,282	68.97%	9,031	29.27%	387	1.25%	156	0.51%	12,251	39.70%	30,856
Mercer	69,303	52.03%	62,180	46.68%	1,211	0.91%	497	0.37%	7,123	5.35%	133,191
Middlesex	149,033	61.41%	88,397	36.42%	4,517	1.86%	747	0.31%	60,636	24.99%	242,694
Monmouth	124,830	65.71%	63,176	33.25%	1,280	0.67%	691	0.36%	61,654	32.46%	189,977
Morris	113,469	68.18%	50,937	30.60%	1,573	0.95%	455	0.27%	62,532	37.58%	166,434
Ocean	77,979	72.43%	27,710	25.74%	1,036	0.96%	942	0.87%	50,269	46.69%	107,667
Passaic	108,511	62.03%	62,302	35.62%	1,401	0.80%	2,709	1.55%	46,209	26.41%	174,923
Salem	16,371	64.84%	8,609	34.10%	216	0.86%	53	0.21%	7,762	30.74%	25,249
Somerset	56,524	66.03%	26,537	31.00%	2,257	2.64%	287	0.34%	29,987	35.03%	85,605
Sussex	25,977	74.44%	8,585	24.60%	299	0.86%	37	0.11%	17,392	49.84%	34,898
Union	148,290	61.03%	90,482	37.24%	2,369	0.98%	1,832	0.75%	57,808	23.79%	242,973
Warren	19,301	65.33%	10,008	33.88%	186	0.63%	48	0.16%	9,293	31.45%	29,543
Totals	1,845,502	61.57%	1,102,211	36.77%	34,378	1.15%	15,138	0.51%	743,291	24.80%	2,997,229

== See also ==
- United States presidential elections in New Jersey
- Presidency of Richard Nixon
- Presidency of Gerald Ford
- The Watergate Scandal
