= 1972 United States presidential election =

Re-election of Richard Nixon

- November 7, 1972

538 members of the Electoral College 270 electoral votes needed to win
- Opinion polls
- Turnout: 56.2% (▼6.3 pp)

Nominee	Richard Nixon	George McGovern
Party	Republican	Democratic
Home state	California	South Dakota
Running mate	Spiro Agnew	Sargent Shriver (Note: (replacing Thomas Eagleton))
Electoral vote	520 (Note: A faithless Republican elector voted for the Libertarian ticket (Hospers–Nathan).)	17
States carried	49	1 + DC
Popular vote	47,168,711	29,173,222
Percentage	60.7%	37.5%
- Presidential election results map. Red denotes states won by Nixon/Agnew and blue denotes those won by McGovern/Shriver. Yellow represents the sole electoral vote for Hospers/Nathan by a Virginia faithless elector. Numbers indicate electoral votes cast by each state and the District of Columbia.
President before election
Richard Nixon
Republican
Elected President
Richard Nixon
Republican

A presidential election was held in the United States on November 7, 1972. Incumbent Republican President Richard Nixon and his running mate, incumbent vice president Spiro Agnew, were re-elected to a second term; they defeated the Democratic ticket of Senator George McGovern and former ambassador to France Sargent Shriver in a landslide. With 60.7% of the popular vote, Nixon won the largest share of the popular vote for the Republican Party in any presidential election.

Nixon swept aside challenges from two Republican representatives in the Republican primaries to win renomination. McGovern, who had played a significant role in changing the Democratic nomination system after the 1968 U.S. presidential election, mobilized the anti-Vietnam War movement and other liberal supporters to win the Democratic nomination. Among the candidates he defeated were early front-runner Edmund Muskie, 1968 nominee Hubert Humphrey, and governor George Wallace.

Nixon emphasized the strong economy and his success in foreign affairs, while McGovern ran on a platform calling for an immediate end to the Vietnam War and the institution of a guaranteed minimum income. Nixon maintained a large lead in polling. McGovern's general election campaign was damaged by the perception that his platform was radical, and by revelations that his initial running mate, Thomas Eagleton, had undergone electroconvulsive therapy as a treatment for depression; Eagleton was replaced by Sargent Shriver after only nineteen days on the ticket. In June, Nixon's reelection committee broke into the Watergate complex to wiretap the Democratic National Committee's headquarters; early news of the incident had little impact on the success of Nixon's campaign, but further damaging revelations in the ensuing Watergate scandal soon engulfed his second term.

Nixon won the election in a landslide victory, taking 60.7% of the popular vote, carrying 49 states and becoming the first Republican to sweep the South, whereas McGovern took just 37.5% of the popular vote. This marked the most recent time that the Republican nominee carried Minnesota in a presidential election; it also made Nixon the only two-term vice president to be elected president twice. The 1972 election was the first since the ratification of the 26th Amendment, which lowered the voting age from 21 to 18, further expanding the electorate.

== Republican nomination ==
Republican candidates:

- John M. Ashbrook, representative from Ohio
- Pete McCloskey, representative from California
- Richard Nixon, president of the United States from California

Republican Party (United States) 1972 Republican Party ticket
Richard Nixon	Spiro Agnew
for President	for Vice President
37th President of the United States (1969–1974)	39th Vice President of the United States (1969–1973)
Campaign

=== Primaries ===
Nixon was a popular incumbent president in 1972, as he was credited with opening the People's Republic of China as a result of his visit that year, and achieving détente with the Soviet Union. Polls showed that Nixon held a strong lead in the Republican primaries. He was challenged by two candidates: liberal congressman Pete McCloskey from California, and conservative congressman John Ashbrook from Ohio. McCloskey ran as an anti-war candidate, while Ashbrook opposed Nixon's détente policies towards China and the Soviet Union. In the New Hampshire primary, McCloskey garnered 19.8% of the vote to Nixon's 67.6%, with Ashbrook receiving 9.7%. Nixon won 1323 of the 1324 delegates to the Republican convention, with McCloskey receiving the vote of one delegate from New Mexico. Vice President Spiro Agnew was re-nominated by acclamation; while both the party's moderate wing and Nixon himself had wanted to replace him with a new running-mate (the moderates favoring Nelson Rockefeller, and Nixon favoring John Connally), it was ultimately concluded that such action would incur too great a risk of losing Agnew's base of conservative supporters.

=== Primary results ===
1972 Republican Party presidential primaries
Candidate	Votes	%
Richard M. Nixon (incumbent)	5,378,704	86.9
Unpledged delegates	317,048	5.1
John M. Ashbrook	311,543	5.0
Paul N. McCloskey	132,731	2.1
George C. Wallace	20,472	0.3
"None of the names shown"	5,350	0.1
Others	22,433	0.4
Total votes	6,188,281	100

=== Convention ===
Seven members of Vietnam Veterans Against the War were brought on federal charges for conspiring to disrupt the Republican convention. They were acquitted by a federal jury in Gainesville, Florida.

== Democratic nomination ==
Democratic Party (United States) 1972 Democratic Party ticket
George McGovern	Sargent Shriver
for President	for Vice President
U.S. Senator from South Dakota (1963–1981)	21st U.S. Ambassador to France (1968–1970)
Campaign

Candidates in this section are sorted by performance in the delegate contests
Hubert Humphrey	George Wallace	Edmund Muskie	Henry M. Jackson	Wilbur Mills	Shirley Chisholm	Terry Sanford
U.S. Vice President from Minnesota (1965–1969)	Governor of Alabama (1961–1967; 1971–1979)	U.S. Senator from Maine (1959–1980)	U.S. Senator from Washington (1953–1983)	U.S. Representative from Arkansas (1939–1977)	U.S. Representative from New York (1969–1983)	Governor of North Carolina (1961–1965)
Campaign	Campaign	Campaign	Campaign	Campaign	Campaign	Campaign
AC: January 10, 1972; 4,119,230 votes 386.30 PD	AC: January 13, 1972; 3,755,424 votes 377.00 PD	AC: January 4, 1972; SC: April 27, 1972; 1,838,314 votes 209.10 PD	AC: November 19, 1971; SC: May 2, 1972; 504,596 votes 53.75 PD	AC: February 11, 1972; 37,401 votes 30.55 PD	AC: January 25, 1972; 430,733 votes 28.65 PD	AC: March 8, 1972; 331,415 votes 27 PD
John Lindsay	Eugene McCarthy	Sam Yorty	Vance Hartke	Patsy Mink	Fred R. Harris	
Mayor of New York from New York (1966–1973)	U.S. Senator from Minnesota (1959–1971)	Mayor of Los Angeles from California (1961–1973)	U.S. Senator from Indiana (1959–1977)	U.S. Representative from Hawaii (1965–1977)	U.S. Senator from Oklahoma (1964–1973)	
Campaign	Campaign	Campaign	Campaign	Campaign	Campaign	
AC: December 28, 1971; W: April 4, 1972; 196,406 votes 6 PD	AC: December 17, 1971; 553,352 votes	AC: November 16, 1971; W: June 5, 1972; E-HH: June 5, 1972; 79,446 votes	AC: January 3, 1972; W: March 26, 1972; E-HH: March 26, 1972; 11,798 votes	W: May 24, 1972; 8,286 votes	AC: September 24, 1971; W: November 10, 1971	

=== Primaries ===
Senate Majority Whip Ted Kennedy, the youngest brother of former president John F. Kennedy and former senator Robert F. Kennedy, both of whom were assassinated in the 1960s, was the favorite to win the 1972 nomination, but he announced he would not be a candidate. The favorite for the Democratic nomination then became Maine Senator Ed Muskie, the 1968 vice-presidential nominee. Muskie's momentum collapsed just prior to the New Hampshire primary, when the "Canuck letter" was published in the Manchester Union-Leader. The letter, actually a forgery from Nixon's "dirty tricks" unit, claimed that Muskie had made disparaging remarks about French-Canadians – a remark likely to injure Muskie's support among the French-American population in northern New England. Subsequently, the paper published an attack on the character of Muskie's wife Jane, reporting that she drank and used off-color language during the campaign. Muskie made an emotional defense of his wife in a speech outside the newspaper's offices during a snowstorm. Though Muskie later stated that what had appeared to the press as tears were actually melted snowflakes, the press reported that Muskie broke down and cried, shattering the candidate's image as calm and reasoned.

Nearly two years before the election, South Dakota Senator George McGovern entered the race as an anti-war, progressive candidate. McGovern was able to pull together support from the anti-war movement and other grassroots support to win the nomination in a primary system he had played a significant part in designing. On January 25, 1972, New York Representative Shirley Chisholm announced she would run, and became the first African-American woman to run for a major-party presidential nomination. Hawaii Representative Patsy Mink also announced she would run, and became the first Asian American person to run for the Democratic presidential nomination. On April 25, George McGovern won the Massachusetts primary. Two days later, journalist Robert Novak quoted a "Democratic senator", later revealed to be Thomas Eagleton, as saying: "The people don't know McGovern is for amnesty, abortion, and legalization of pot. Once middle America – Catholic middle America, in particular – finds this out, he's dead." The label stuck, and McGovern became known as the candidate of "amnesty, abortion, and acid". It became Humphrey's battle cry to stop McGovern—especially in the Nebraska primary.

Alabama Governor George Wallace, an infamous segregationist who ran on a third-party ticket in 1968, did well in the Southern United States (winning nearly every county in the Florida primary) and among alienated and dissatisfied voters in the North. What might have become a forceful campaign was cut short when Wallace was shot in an assassination attempt by Arthur Bremer on May 15. Wallace was struck by five bullets and left paralyzed from the waist down. The day after the assassination attempt, Wallace won the Michigan and Maryland primaries, but the shooting effectively ended his campaign, and he pulled out in July. In the end, McGovern won the nomination by winning primaries through grassroots support, in spite of establishment opposition. McGovern had led a commission to re-design the Democratic nomination system after the divisive nomination struggle and convention of 1968. However, the new rules angered many prominent Democrats whose influence was marginalized, and those politicians refused to support McGovern's campaign (some even supporting Nixon instead), leaving the McGovern campaign at a significant disadvantage in funding, compared to Nixon. Some of the principles of the McGovern Commission have lasted throughout every subsequent nomination contest, but the Hunt Commission instituted the selection of superdelegates a decade later, in order to reduce the nomination chances of outsiders such as McGovern and Jimmy Carter.

=== Primary results ===
Statewide contest by winner No primary held Shirley Chisholm Hubert Humphrey Henry M. Jackson George McGovern Wilbur Mills Edmund Muskie George Wallace

1972 Democratic Party presidential primaries
Candidate	Votes	%
Hubert H. Humphrey	4,121,372	25.8
George S. McGovern	4,053,451	25.3
George C. Wallace	3,755,424	23.5
Edmund S. Muskie	1,840,217	11.5
Eugene J. McCarthy	553,955	3.5
Henry M. Jackson	505,198	3.2
Shirley A. Chisholm	430,703	2.7
James T. Sanford	331,415	2.1
John V. Lindsay	196,406	1.2
Sam W. Yorty	79,446	0.5
Wilbur D. Mills	37,401	0.2
Walter E. Fauntroy	21,217	0.1
Unpledged delegates	19,533	0.1
Edward M. Kennedy	16,693	0.1
Rupert V. Hartke	11,798	0.1
Patsy M. Mink	8,286	0.1
"None of the names shown"	6,269	0
Others	5,181	0
Total votes	15,993,965	100

=== Notable endorsements ===
Edmund Muskie
- Former Governor of New York and U.S. Secretary of Commerce W. Averell Harriman
- Senator Harold Hughes from Iowa
- Senator Birch Bayh from Indiana
- Senator Adlai Stevenson III from Illinois
- Senator Mike Gravel of Alaska
- Former Senator Stephen M. Young from Ohio
- Governor Milton Shapp of Pennsylvania
- Former Governor Michael DiSalle of Ohio
- Ohio State Treasurer Gertrude W. Donahey
- Astronaut John Glenn from Ohio

George McGovern

- Senator Frank Church from Idaho

George Wallace

- Former Governor Lester Maddox of Georgia

Shirley Chisholm

- Representative Ron Dellums from California
- Feminist leader and author Betty Friedan
- Feminist leader, journalist, and DNC official Gloria Steinem

Terry Sanford

- Former President Lyndon B. Johnson from Texas

Henry M. Jackson

- Governor Jimmy Carter of Georgia

=== 1972 Democratic National Convention ===
Video from the Florida conventions

Results:

- George McGovern – 1864.95
- Henry M. Jackson – 525
- George Wallace – 381.7
- Shirley Chisholm – 151.95
- Terry Sanford – 77.5
- Hubert Humphrey – 66.7
- Wilbur Mills – 33.8
- Edmund Muskie – 24.3
- Ted Kennedy – 12.7
- Sam Yorty – 10
- Wayne Hays – 5
- John Lindsay – 5
- Fred Harris – 2
- Eugene McCarthy – 2
- Walter Mondale – 2
- Ramsey Clark – 1
- Walter Fauntroy – 1
- Vance Hartke – 1
- Harold Hughes – 1
- Patsy Mink – 1

=== Vice presidential vote ===
Most polls showed McGovern running well behind incumbent President Richard Nixon, except when McGovern was paired with Massachusetts Senator Ted Kennedy. McGovern and his campaign brain trust lobbied Kennedy heavily to accept the bid to be McGovern's running mate, but he continually refused their advances, and instead suggested U.S. Representative (and House Ways and Means Committee chairman) Wilbur Mills from Arkansas and Boston mayor Kevin White. Offers were then made to Hubert Humphrey, Connecticut Senator Abraham Ribicoff, and Minnesota Senator Walter Mondale, all of whom turned it down. Finally, the vice presidential slot was offered to Senator Thomas Eagleton from Missouri, who accepted the offer. With hundreds of delegates displeased with McGovern, the vote to ratify Eagleton's candidacy was chaotic, with at least three other candidates having their names put into nomination and votes scattered over 70 candidates. A grassroots attempt to displace Eagleton in favor of Texas state representative Frances Farenthold gained significant traction, though was ultimately unable to change the outcome of the vote.

External videos
- Washington Journal interview with Joshua Glasser on his book The Eighteen-Day Running Mate: McGovern, Eagleton, and a Campaign in Crisis, September 1, 2012, C-SPAN

The vice-presidential balloting went on so long that McGovern and Eagleton were forced to begin making their acceptance speeches at around 2 am, local time. After the convention ended, it was discovered that Eagleton had undergone psychiatric electroshock therapy for depression and had concealed this information from McGovern. A Time magazine poll taken at the time found that 77 percent of the respondents said, "Eagleton's medical record would not affect their vote." Nonetheless, the press made frequent references to his "shock therapy", and McGovern feared that this would detract from his campaign platform. McGovern subsequently consulted confidentially with pre-eminent psychiatrists, including Eagleton's own doctors, who advised him that a recurrence of Eagleton's depression was possible and could endanger the country, should Eagleton become president.

McGovern had initially claimed that he would back Eagleton "1000 percent", only to ask Eagleton to withdraw three days later. This perceived lack of conviction in sticking with his running mate was disastrous for the McGovern campaign. McGovern later approached six prominent Democrats to run for vice president: Ted Kennedy, Edmund Muskie, Hubert Humphrey, Abraham Ribicoff, Larry O'Brien, and Reubin Askew. All six declined. Sargent Shriver, brother-in-law to John, Robert, and Ted Kennedy, former Ambassador to France, and former Director of the Peace Corps, later accepted. He was officially nominated by a special session of the Democratic National Committee. By this time, McGovern's poll ratings had plunged from 41 to 24 percent.

== Third parties ==
1972 American Independent Party ticket
John G. Schmitz	Thomas J. Anderson
for President	for Vice President
U.S. Representative from California's 35th district (1970–1973)	Magazine publisher; conservative speaker
Campaign

Other Candidates
Lester Maddox	Thomas J. Anderson	George Wallace
Lieutenant Governor of Georgia (1971–1975); Governor of Georgia (1967–1971)	Magazine publisher; conservative speaker	Governor of Alabama (1963–1967, 1971–1979); 1968 AIP presidential nominee
Campaign	Campaign	Campaign
56 votes	24 votes	8 votes

The only major third party candidate in the 1972 election was conservative Republican Representative John G. Schmitz, who ran on the American Independent Party ticket (the party on whose ballot George Wallace ran in 1968). He was on the ballot in 32 states and received 1,099,482 votes. Unlike Wallace, however, he did not win a majority of votes cast in any state, and received no electoral votes, although he did finish ahead of McGovern in four of the most conservative Idaho counties. Schmitz's performance in archconservative Jefferson County was the best by a third-party presidential candidate in any free or postbellum state county since 1936 when William Lemke reached over twenty-eight percent of the vote in the North Dakota counties of Burke, Sheridan and Hettinger. Schmitz was endorsed by fellow John Birch Society member Walter Brennan, who also served as finance chairman for his campaign.

John Hospers and Theodora "Tonie" Nathan of the newly formed Libertarian Party were on the ballot only in Colorado and Washington, but were official write-in candidates in four others, and received 3,674 votes, winning no states. However, they did receive one Electoral College vote from Virginia from a Republican faithless elector (see below). The Libertarian vice-presidential nominee Tonie Nathan became the first Jew and the first woman in U.S. history to receive an Electoral College vote. Linda Jenness was nominated by the Socialist Workers Party, with Andrew Pulley as her running mate. Benjamin Spock and Julius Hobson were nominated for president and vice-president, respectively, by the People's Party at its national convention.

== General election ==
=== Polling aggregation ===
The following graph depicts the standing of each candidate in the poll aggregators from February 1972 to Election Day.

Richard Nixon George McGovern George Wallace (Note: Despite running for the Democratic Presidential nomination, there was an expectation that Wallace would again bolt the Democratic Party and run as an independent in the general election; as a result, some polls made an assumption that this was going to be the case. To reflect this, the aggregate includes those polls up to the point where Wallace definitively declined to make an independent run for the Presidency.)

=== Polling ===
Poll source	Date(s) administered	Richard Nixon (R)	George McGovern (D)	George Wallace (AI) (Note: It remained an open question far into the election season whether Wallace would again bolt the Democratic Party and run as an independent candidate in the General should he fail to win the Democratic nomination, with some polls being commissioned as though it were a fait accompli.)	Other	Undecided	Margin
Election Results	November 7, 1972	60.67%	37.52%	-	1.81%	-	23.15
Harris	November 2–4, 1972	59%	35%	-	-	6%	24
Gallup	November 2-4, 1972	61%	35%	-	1%	3%	26
Harris	October 24–26, 1972	60%	32%	-	-	8%	28
Harris	October 17–19, 1972	59%	34%	-	-	7%	25
Gallup	October 13-16, 1972	59%	36%	-	-	5%	23
Gallup	Sep. 29-Oct. 9, 1972	60%	34%	-	1%	5%	26
Harris	October 3–5, 1972	60%	33%	-	-	7%	27
Gallup	September 22-25, 1972	61%	33%	-	1%	5%	28
Harris	September 19–21, 1972	59%	31%	-	-	10%	28
Harris	Aug. 30–Sep. 1, 1972	63%	29%	-	-	8%	34
Gallup	August 25-28, 1972	61%	36%	-	-	3%	25
Gallup	August 26-27, 1972	64%	30%	-	-	6%	34
August 21–23: Republican National Convention
Gallup	August 4-7, 1972	57%	31%	-	-	12%	26
Harris	August 2–3, 1972	57%	34%	-	-	9%	23
Gallup	July 14-17, 1972	56%	37%	-	-	7%	19
July 10–13: Democratic National Convention
Harris	July 1–6, 1972	55%	35%	-	-	10%	20
Gallup	June 16-19, 1972	45%	32%	18%	-	5%	13
Gallup	June 16-19, 1972	53%	37%	-	-	10%	16
Harris	June 7–10, 1972	45%	33%	17%	-	5%	12
Harris	June 7–10, 1972	54%	38%	-	-	8%	16
Gallup	May 26-29, 1972	43%	30%	19%	-	8%	13
Gallup	May 26-29, 1972	53%	34%	-	-	13%	19
Harris	May 9–10, 1972	40%	35%	17%	-	8%	5
Harris	May 9–10, 1972	48%	41%	-	-	11%	7
Gallup	Apr. 28-May 1, 1972	43%	35%	15%	-	7%	8
Gallup	Apr. 28-May 1, 1972	49%	39%	-	-	12%	10
Gallup	April 21-24, 1972	45%	32%	16%	-	7%	13
Gallup	April 14-17, 1972	46%	31%	15%	-	8%	15
Harris	April 1–7, 1972	47%	29%	16%	-	8%	18
Harris	April 1–7, 1972	54%	34%	-	-	12%	20
Harris	Feb. 28 – Mar. 7, 1972	53%	28%	13%	-	6%	25
Harris	Feb. 28 – Mar. 7, 1972	59%	32%	-	-	9%	27
Gallup	February 4-7, 1972	49%	34%	11%	-	6%	15
Harris	November, 1971	49%	31%	12%	-	8%	18
Harris	August 24-27, 1971	48%	33%	13%	-	6%	15
Harris	May, 1971	47%	33%	11%	-	9%	14
Harris	April, 1971	46%	36%	13%	-	5%	10
Harris	February, 1971	45%	34%	12%	-	9%	11

=== Campaign ===
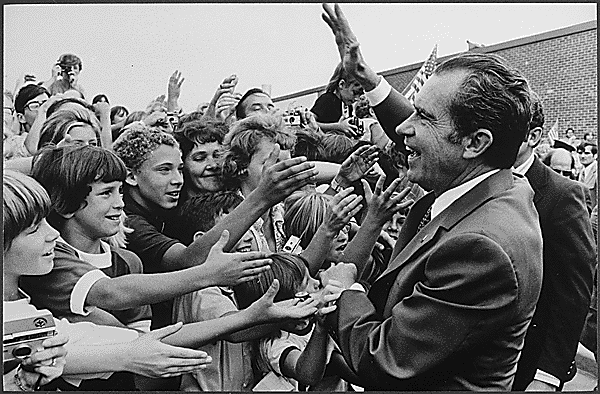
Nixon during an August 1972 campaign stop

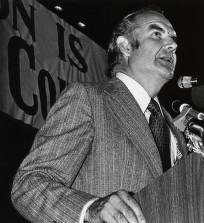
McGovern speaking at an October 1972 campaign rally

McGovern ran on a platform of immediately ending the Vietnam War and instituting a guaranteed minimum income for the nation's poor. His campaign was harmed by his views during the primaries, which alienated many powerful Democrats, the perception that his foreign policy was too extreme, and the Eagleton debacle. As a result of these factors, McGovern's campaign was weakened, with the Republicans portraying McGovern as a radical left-wing extremist, and Nixon led in the polls by large margins throughout the entire campaign. With an enormous fundraising advantage and a comfortable lead in the polls, Nixon concentrated on large rallies and focused speeches to closed and select audiences, leaving much of the retail campaigning to surrogates like Vice President Agnew. Nixon did not try by design to extend his coattails to Republican congressional or gubernatorial candidates, preferring to pad his own margin of victory.

=== Results ===
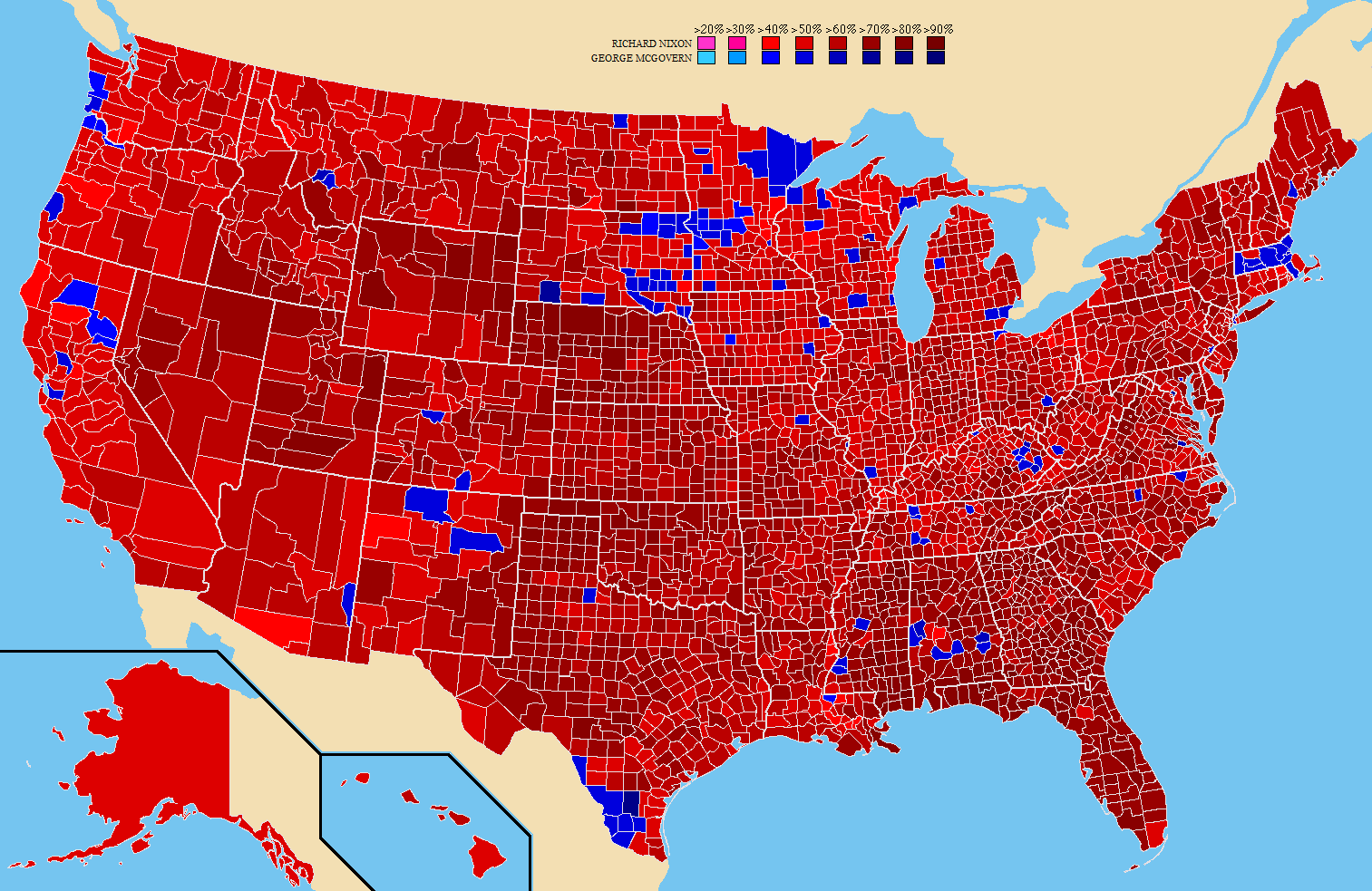
Results by county Richard Nixon George McGovern

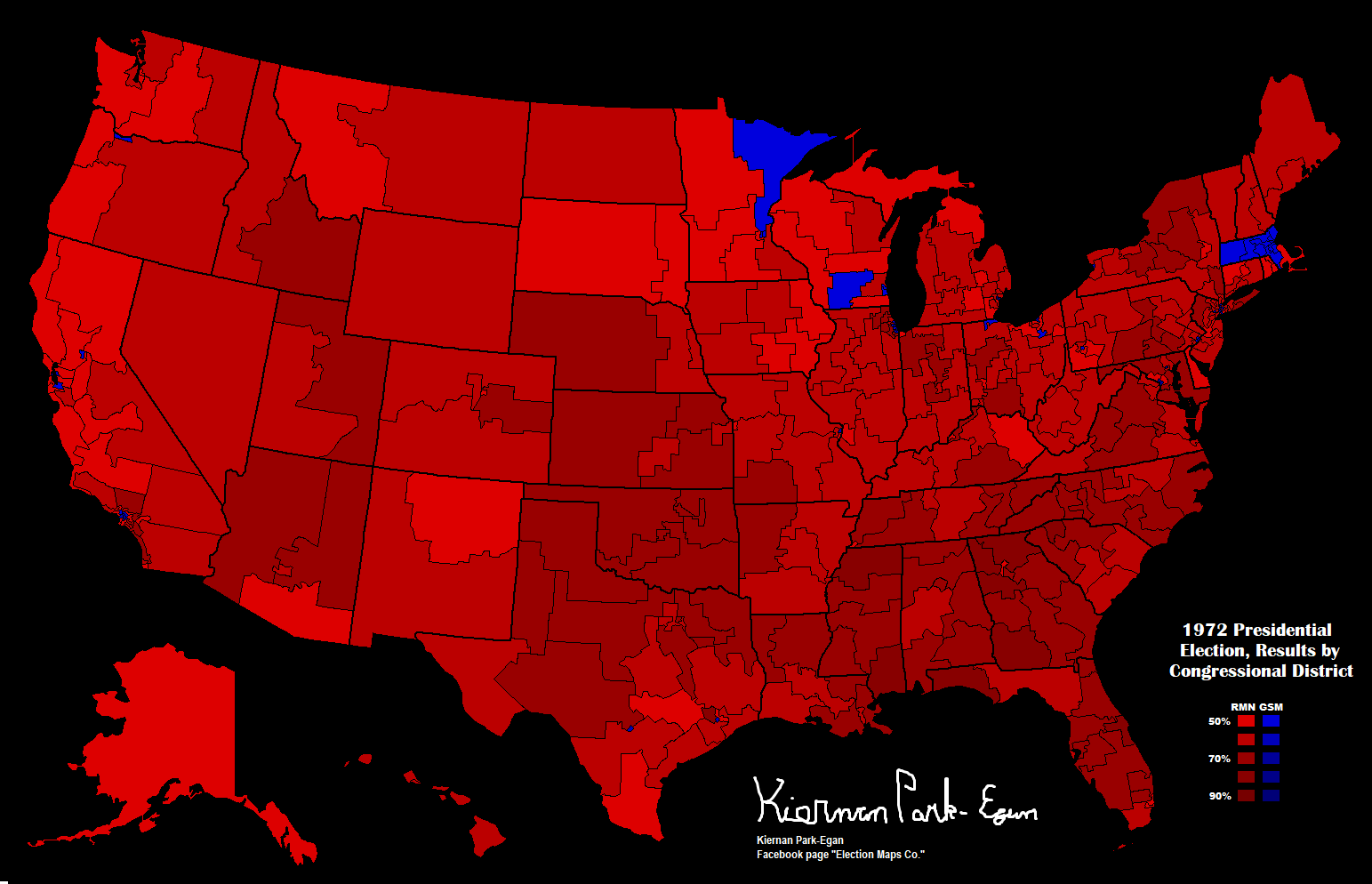
Results by congressional district

Results by margin

This presidential election was the first since 1808 in which New York did not have the largest number of electors in the Electoral College, having fallen to 41 electors versus California's 45.

Nixon's percentage of the popular vote was only marginally less than Lyndon B. Johnson's record in 1964, and his margin of victory was slightly larger. Nixon won a majority vote in 49 states, including McGovern's home state of South Dakota. Only Massachusetts and the District of Columbia voted for the challenger, resulting in an even more lopsided Electoral College tally. McGovern garnered only 37.5 percent of the national popular vote, the lowest share received by a Democratic Party nominee since John W. Davis won only 28.8 percent of the vote in 1924. The only major party candidate since 1972 to receive less than 40 percent of the vote was Republican incumbent President George H. W. Bush who won 37.4 percent of the vote in 1992, an election that, as in 1924, was affected by a strong third-party vote. Nixon received the highest share of the popular vote for a Republican in history.

Although the McGovern campaign believed that its man had a better chance of defeating Nixon because of the new Twenty-sixth Amendment to the United States Constitution that lowered the national voting age to 18 from 21, most of the youth vote went to Nixon. This was the first election in American history in which a Republican candidate carried every single Southern state, continuing the region's transformation from a Democratic bastion (Solid South) into a Republican stronghold as President Nixon became the first Republican presidential candidate in a century to carry Arkansas. By this time, all the Southern states, except Arkansas and Texas, had been carried by a Republican in either the previous election or that of 1964, although Republican candidates carried Texas in 1928, 1952, and 1956. As a result of this election, Massachusetts became the only state that Nixon did not carry in any of the three presidential elections in which he was a candidate. Nixon became the first Republican to ever win two terms in the White House without carrying Massachusetts at least once, a feat later duplicated by George W. Bush and Donald Trump. Additionally, this remains the last one in which the Republican candidate carried Minnesota.

McGovern won a mere 130 counties, plus the District of Columbia and four county-equivalents in Alaska, (Note: These were North Slope Borough, plus Bethel, Kusilvak and Hoonah-Angoon Census Areas.) easily the fewest counties won by any major-party presidential nominee since the advent of popular presidential elections, surpassing the previous lowest figures that had been recorded by Republicans William Howard Taft in 1912, and Herbert Hoover in 1932 in failed bids for re-election as president (Taft's total of 232 counties was the lowest recorded overall by a major-party candidate, and Hoover's 374 was the lowest earned by a candidate who finished in second place). In nineteen states, (Note: Arkansas, Connecticut, Delaware, Florida, Georgia, Hawaii, Idaho, Indiana, Kansas, Nebraska, Nevada, New Hampshire, New Jersey, Oklahoma, Rhode Island, South Carolina, Utah, Vermont, and Wyoming.) McGovern failed to carry a single county; he carried a mere one county-equivalent in a further nine states. (Note: Arizona (Greenlee), Illinois (Jackson), Louisiana (West Feliciana Parish), Maine (Androscoggin), Maryland (Baltimore), North Dakota (Rolette), Pennsylvania (Philadelphia), Virginia (Charles City), and West Virginia (Logan).) In contrast to Walter Mondale's narrow 1984 win in Minnesota, McGovern comfortably won Massachusetts but lost every other state by at least five percentage points, as well as 45 states by more than ten percentage points (all but Massachusetts, Minnesota, Rhode Island, Wisconsin, and his home state of South Dakota). This also made Nixon the second former vice president in American history, after Thomas Jefferson (in 1800 and 1804), and the only two-term Vice President to be elected President twice. Since McGovern carried only one state, bumper stickers reading "Nixon 49 America 1", "Don't Blame Me, I'm From Massachusetts", and "Massachusetts: The One And Only" were popular for a short time in Massachusetts. Nixon managed to win 18% of the African American vote (Gerald Ford would get 16% in 1976).

The Wallace vote had been crucial to Nixon being able to sweep the states that had narrowly held out against him in 1968 (Maryland, Texas, and West Virginia), as well as the states Wallace won himself (Alabama, Arkansas, Georgia, Louisiana, and Mississippi). The pro-Wallace group of voters had given AIP nominee John Schmitz a mere 2.4% of its support, while 19.1% backed McGovern, and the majority 78.5% broke for Nixon. Nixon, who became term-limited under the provisions of the Twenty-second Amendment as a result of his victory, became the first presidential candidate to win a significant number of electoral votes in three presidential elections since the ratification of that Amendment; only Trump has done the same. As of 2024, Nixon was the seventh of eight presidential nominees to win a significant number of electoral votes in at least three elections, the others being Jefferson, Andrew Jackson, Henry Clay, Grover Cleveland, William Jennings Bryan, Franklin D. Roosevelt, and Trump. The 520 electoral votes received by Nixon, added to the 301 electoral votes he received in 1968 and the 219 electoral votes he received in 1960, gave him 1,040 electoral votes, the second most total received by any presidential candidate (after Franklin D. Roosevelt's 1,876 total electoral votes). (Note: In addition, if electoral votes for vice presidential candidates are counted, Nixon won 442 electoral votes when he was elected vice president in 1952 and 457 electoral votes in 1956, giving him 1,939 electoral votes over five presidential elections. Franklin Roosevelt also won 127 electoral votes when he ran for vice president in 1920, giving him 2,003 electoral votes over five presidential elections.)

Electoral results
Presidential candidate	Party	Home state	Popular vote		Electoral vote	Running mate		
Presidential candidate	Party	Home state	Count	Percentage	Electoral vote	Vice-presidential candidate	Home state	Electoral vote
Richard Nixon (incumbent)	Republican	California	47,168,710	60.67%	520	Spiro T. Agnew (incumbent)	Maryland	520
George McGovern	Democratic	South Dakota	29,173,222	37.52%	17	Sargent Shriver	Maryland	17
John G. Schmitz	American Independent	California	1,100,896	1.42%	0	Thomas J. Anderson	Tennessee	0
Linda Jenness	Socialist Workers	Georgia	83,380 (Note: In Arizona, Pima and Yavapai counties had an unusually formatted ballot that led voters to believe they could vote for a major party presidential candidate and simultaneously vote the six individual Socialist Workers Party presidential electors. Technically, these were overvotes, and should not have counted for either the major party candidates or the Socialist Workers Party electors. Within two days of the election, the Attorney General and Pima County Attorney had agreed that all votes should count. The Socialist Workers Party had not qualified as a party, and thus did not have a presidential candidate. In the official state canvass, votes for Nixon, McGovern, or Schmitz, are shown as being for the presidential candidate, the party, and the elector slate of the party; while those for the Socialist Worker Party elector candidates were for those candidates only. In the view of the Secretary of State, the votes were not for Linda Jenness. Some tabulations count the votes for Jenness. Historically, presidential candidate names did not appear on ballots, and voters voted directly for the electors. Nonetheless, votes for the electors are attributed to the presidential candidate. Counting the votes in Arizona for Jenness is consistent with this practice. Because of the confusing ballots, Socialist Workers Party electors received votes on about 21 percent and 8 percent of ballots in Pima and Yavapai, respectively. 30,579 of the party's 30,945 Arizona votes are from those two counties.)	0.11%	0	Andrew Pulley	Illinois	0
Benjamin Spock	People's	California	78,759	0.10%	0	Julius Hobson	District of Columbia	0
Louis Fisher	Socialist Labor	Illinois	53,814	0.07%	0	Genevieve Gunderson	Minnesota	0
John G. Hospers	Libertarian	California	3,674	0.00%	1 (Note: A Virginia faithless elector, Roger MacBride, though pledged to vote for Richard Nixon and Spiro Agnew, instead voted for Libertarian candidates John Hospers and Theodora "Tonie" Nathan.)	Theodora Nathan	Oregon	1 (Note: A Virginia faithless elector, Roger MacBride, though pledged to vote for Richard Nixon and Spiro Agnew, instead voted for Libertarian candidates John Hospers and Theodora "Tonie" Nathan.)
Other			81,575	0.10%	—	Other		—
Total			77,744,030	100%	538			538
Needed to win					270			270

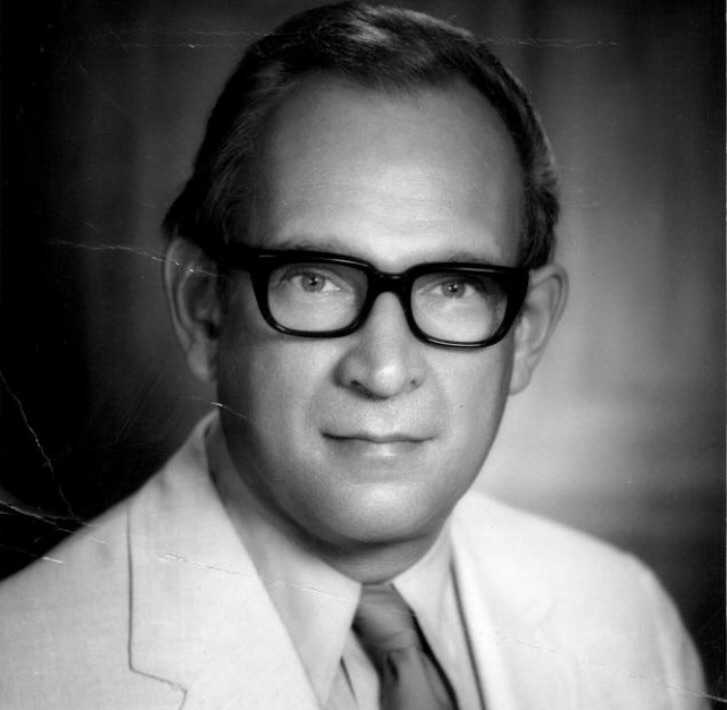
John Hospers received one faithless electoral vote from Virginia.

Popular vote
Nixon	60.67%
McGovern	37.52%
Schmitz	1.42%
Others	0.39%

Electoral vote
Nixon	96.65%
McGovern	3.16%
Hospers	0.19%

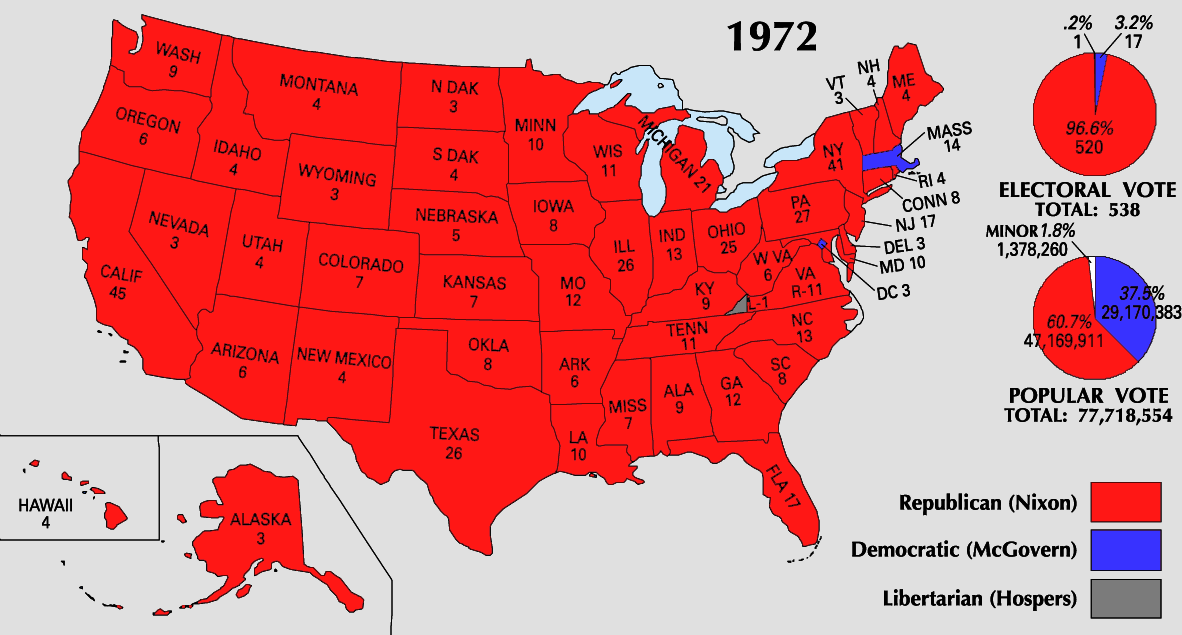

Results by county, shaded according to winning candidate's percentage of the vote

=== Results by state ===
Legend
States/districts won by Nixon/Agnew
States/districts won by McGovern/Shriver
†	At-large results (for Maine, which split electoral votes)

Outcomes of the 1972 United States presidential election by state
State or district	Nixon/Agnew Republican			McGovern/Shriver Democratic			Schmitz/Anderson American Independent			Hospers/Nathan Libertarian			Margin		Total votes
State or district	Votes	%	EV	Votes	%	EV	Votes	%	EV	Votes	%	EV	Votes		Total votes
Alabama	728,701	72.43	9	256,923	25.54	–	11,918	1.18	–	–	–	–	471,778	46.89	1,006,093
Alaska	55,349	58.13	3	32,967	34.62	–	6,903	7.25	–	–	–	–	22,382	23.51	95,219
Arizona	402,812	61.64	6	198,540	30.38	–	21,208	3.25	–	–	–	–	204,272	31.26	653,505
Arkansas	445,751	68.82	6	198,899	30.71	–	3,016	0.47	–	–	–	–	246,852	38.11	647,666
California	4,602,096	55.00	45	3,475,847	41.54	–	232,554	2.78	–	980	0.01	–	1,126,249	13.46	8,367,862
Colorado	597,189	62.61	7	329,980	34.59	–	17,269	1.81	–	1,111	0.12	–	267,209	28.01	953,884
Connecticut	810,763	58.57	8	555,498	40.13	–	17,239	1.25	–	–	–	–	255,265	18.44	1,384,277
Delaware	140,357	59.60	3	92,283	39.18	–	2,638	1.12	–	–	–	–	48,074	20.41	235,516
District of Columbia	35,226	21.56	–	127,627	78.10	3	–	–	–	–	–	–	−92,401	−56.54	163,421
Florida	1,857,759	71.91	17	718,117	27.80	–	–	–	–	–	–	–	1,139,642	44.12	2,583,283
Georgia	881,496	75.04	12	289,529	24.65	–	812	0.07	–	–	–	–	591,967	50.39	1,174,772
Hawaii	168,865	62.48	4	101,409	37.52	–	–	–	–	–	–	–	67,456	24.96	270,274
Idaho	199,384	64.24	4	80,826	26.04	–	28,869	9.30	–	–	–	–	118,558	38.20	310,379
Illinois	2,788,179	59.03	26	1,913,472	40.51	–	2,471	0.05	–	–	–	–	874,707	18.52	4,723,236
Indiana	1,405,154	66.11	13	708,568	33.34	–	–	–	–	–	–	–	696,586	32.77	2,125,529
Iowa	706,207	57.61	8	496,206	40.48	–	22,056	1.80	–	–	–	–	210,001	17.13	1,225,944
Kansas	619,812	67.66	7	270,287	29.50	–	21,808	2.38	–	–	–	–	349,525	38.15	916,095
Kentucky	676,446	63.37	9	371,159	34.77	–	17,627	1.65	–	–	–	–	305,287	28.60	1,067,499
Louisiana	686,852	65.32	10	298,142	28.35	–	52,099	4.95	–	–	–	–	388,710	36.97	1,051,491
Maine †	256,458	61.46	2	160,584	38.48	–	117	0.03	–	1	0.00	–	95,874	22.98	417,271
ME-1	135,388	61.42	1	85,028	38.58	–	Unknown	Unknown	–	Unknown	Unknown	–	50,360	22.85	220,416
ME-2	121,120	61.58	1	75,556	38.42	–	Unknown	Unknown	–	Unknown	Unknown	–	45,564	23.17	196,676
Maryland	829,305	61.26	10	505,781	37.36	–	18,726	1.38	–	–	–	–	323,524	23.90	1,353,812
Massachusetts	1,112,078	45.23	–	1,332,540	54.20	14	2,877	0.12	–	43	0.00	–	−220,462	−8.97	2,458,756
Michigan	1,961,721	56.20	21	1,459,435	41.81	–	63,321	1.81	–	–	–	–	502,286	14.39	3,490,325
Minnesota	898,269	51.58	10	802,346	46.07	–	31,407	1.80	–	–	–	–	95,923	5.51	1,741,652
Mississippi	505,125	78.20	7	126,782	19.63	–	11,598	1.80	–	–	–	–	378,343	58.57	645,963
Missouri	1,154,058	62.29	12	698,531	37.71	–	–	–	–	–	–	–	455,527	24.59	1,852,589
Montana	183,976	57.93	4	120,197	37.85	–	13,430	4.23	–	–	–	–	63,779	20.08	317,603
Nebraska	406,298	70.50	5	169,991	29.50	–	–	–	–	–	–	–	236,307	41.00	576,289
Nevada	115,750	63.68	3	66,016	36.32	–	–	–	–	–	–	–	49,734	27.36	181,766
New Hampshire	213,724	63.98	4	116,435	34.86	–	3,386	1.01	–	–	–	–	97,289	29.12	334,055
New Jersey	1,845,502	61.57	17	1,102,211	36.77	–	34,378	1.15	–	–	–	–	743,291	24.80	2,997,229
New Mexico	235,606	61.05	4	141,084	36.56	–	8,767	2.27	–	–	–	–	94,522	24.49	385,931
New York	4,192,778	58.54	41	2,951,084	41.21	–	–	–	–	–	–	–	1,241,694	17.34	7,161,830
North Carolina	1,054,889	69.46	13	438,705	28.89	–	25,018	1.65	–	–	–	–	616,184	40.58	1,518,612
North Dakota	174,109	62.07	3	100,384	35.79	–	5,646	2.01	–	–	–	–	73,725	26.28	280,514
Ohio	2,441,827	59.63	25	1,558,889	38.07	–	80,067	1.96	–	–	–	–	882,938	21.56	4,094,787
Oklahoma	759,025	73.70	8	247,147	24.00	–	23,728	2.30	–	–	–	–	511,878	49.70	1,029,900
Oregon	486,686	52.45	6	392,760	42.33	–	46,211	4.98	–	–	–	–	93,926	10.12	927,946
Pennsylvania	2,714,521	59.11	27	1,796,951	39.13	–	70,593	1.54	–	–	–	–	917,570	19.98	4,592,105
Rhode Island	220,383	53.00	4	194,645	46.81	–	25	0.01	–	2	0.00	–	25,738	6.19	415,808
South Carolina	478,427	70.58	8	189,270	27.92	–	10,166	1.50	–	–	–	–	289,157	42.66	677,880
South Dakota	166,476	54.15	4	139,945	45.52	–	–	–	–	–	–	–	26,531	8.63	307,415
Tennessee	813,147	67.70	10	357,293	29.75	–	30,373	2.53	–	–	–	–	455,854	37.95	1,201,182
Texas	2,298,896	66.20	26	1,154,291	33.24	–	7,098	0.20	–	–	–	–	1,144,605	32.96	3,472,714
Utah	323,643	67.64	4	126,284	26.39	–	28,549	5.97	–	–	–	–	197,359	41.25	478,476
Vermont	117,149	62.66	3	68,174	36.47	–	–	–	–	–	–	–	48,975	26.20	186,947
Virginia	988,493	67.84	11	438,887	30.12	–	19,721	1.35	–	–	–	1	549,606	37.72	1,457,019
Washington	837,135	56.92	9	568,334	38.64	–	58,906	4.00	–	1,537	0.10	–	268,801	18.28	1,470,847
West Virginia	484,964	63.61	6	277,435	36.39	–	–	–	–	–	–	–	207,529	27.22	762,399
Wisconsin	989,430	53.40	11	810,174	43.72	–	47,525	2.56	–	–	–	–	179,256	9.67	1,852,890
Wyoming	100,464	69.01	3	44,358	30.47	–	748	0.51	–	–	–	–	56,106	38.54	145,570
Total	47,168,710	60.67	520	29,173,222	37.52	17	1,100,868	1.42	0	3,674	0.00	1	17,995,488	23.15	77,744,027

For the first time since 1828, Maine allowed its electoral votes to be split between candidates. Two electoral votes were awarded to the winner of the statewide race and one electoral vote to the winner of each congressional district. This was the first time the Congressional District Method had been used since Michigan used it in 1892. Nixon won all four votes.

==== States that flipped from Democratic to Republican ====
- Connecticut
- Hawaii
- Maine
- Maryland
- Michigan
- Minnesota
- New York
- Pennsylvania
- Rhode Island
- Texas
- Washington
- West Virginia

==== States that flipped from American Independent to Republican ====
- Georgia
- Louisiana
- Alabama
- Mississippi
- Arkansas

=== Close states ===
States where margin of victory was more than 5 percentage points, but less than 15 percentage points (115 electoral votes):

1. Minnesota, 5.51% (95,923 votes)
2. Rhode Island, 6.19% (25,738 votes)
3. South Dakota, 8.63% (26,531 votes)
4. Massachusetts, 8.97% (220,462 votes)
5. Wisconsin, 9.67% (179,256 votes)
6. Oregon, 10.12% (93,926 votes)
7. California, 13.46% (1,126,249 votes)
8. Michigan, 14.39% (502,286 votes)

Tipping point states:

1. Ohio, 21.56% (882,938 votes) (tipping point for a Nixon victory)
2. Maine-1, 22.85% (50,360 votes) (tipping point for a McGovern victory)

==== Statistics ====
Counties with highest percentage of the vote (Republican)

1. Dade County, Georgia 93.45%
2. Glascock County, Georgia 93.38%
3. George County, Mississippi 92.90%
4. Holmes County, Florida 92.51%
5. Smith County, Mississippi 92.35%

Counties with highest percentage of the vote (Democratic)

1. Duval County, Texas 85.68%
2. Washington, D. C. 78.10%
3. Shannon County, South Dakota 77.34%
4. Greene County, Alabama 68.32%
5. Charles City County, Virginia 67.84%

Counties with highest percentage of the vote (Other)

1. Jefferson County, Idaho 27.51%
2. Lemhi County, Idaho 19.77%
3. Fremont County, Idaho 19.32%
4. Bonneville County, Idaho 18.97%
5. Madison County, Idaho 17.04%

== Voter demographics ==
The 1972 presidential vote by demographic subgroup
	McGovern	Nixon
Gender
Men	37	63
Women	38	62
Age
Under 30	48	52
30-49	33	67
50 or Older	36	64
Race
White	32	68
Non-White	87	13
Religion
Protestant	30	70
Catholic	48	52
Education
College	37	63
High School	34	66
Grade School	49	51
Occupation
Business	31	69
White Collar	36	64
Manual	43	57
Party ID
Republican	5	95
Democrat	67	33
Independent	31	69
Region
East	42	58
Midwest	40	60
South	29	71
West	41	59
Union Status
Union Family	46	54

Nixon won 36 percent of the Democratic vote, according to an exit poll conducted for CBS News by George Fine Research, Inc. This represents more than twice the percentage of voters who typically defect from their party in presidential elections. Nixon also became the first Republican presidential candidate in American history to win the Roman Catholic vote (53–46), and the first in recent history to win the blue-collar vote, which he won by a 5-to-4 margin. McGovern narrowly won the union vote (50–48), although this difference was within the survey's margin of error of 2 percentage points. McGovern also narrowly won the youth vote (i. e. those aged 18 to 24) 52–46, a narrower margin than many of his strategists had predicted. This was the first presidential election held after the ratification of the 26th Amendment, lowering the minimum voting age to 18. Early on, the McGovern campaign also significantly over-estimated the number of young people who would vote in the election; they predicted that 18 million would have voted in total but exit polls indicate that the actual number was about 12 million. McGovern comfortably won among both African-American and Jewish voters but by somewhat smaller margins than usual for a Democratic candidate. McGovern won the African American vote by 87% to Nixon's 13%.

== Aftermath ==
On June 17, 1972, five months before election day, five men broke into the Democratic National Committee headquarters at the Watergate Hotel at the Watergate complex in Washington, D.C.. The resulting investigation led to the revelation of attempted cover-ups of the break-in within the Nixon administration. What became known as the Watergate scandal eroded President Nixon's public and political support in his second term, and he resigned on August 9, 1974, in the face of probable impeachment by the House of Representatives and removal from office by the Senate. As part of the continuing Watergate investigation in 1974–1975, federal prosecutors offered companies that had given illegal campaign contributions to President Nixon's re-election campaign lenient sentences if they came forward. Many companies complied, including Northrop Grumman, 3M, American Airlines, and Braniff Airlines. By 1976, prosecutors had convicted 18 American corporations of contributing illegally to Nixon's campaign. Despite this election delivering Nixon's greatest electoral triumph, Nixon later wrote in his memoirs that "it was one of the most frustrating and in many ways the least satisfying of all".

Vice President Agnew also resigned in 1973, following an investigation of corruption in Maryland during Agnew's governorship and an ensuing controversy around Agnew's tax returns. He was replaced by Nixon (with Congressional confirmation) with Gerald Ford, who ascended to the Presidency after Nixon's own resignation.

== See also ==
- 1972 United States House of Representatives elections
- 1972 United States Senate elections
- 1972 United States gubernatorial elections
- George McGovern 1972 presidential campaign
- Second inauguration of Richard Nixon

== Bibliography and further reading ==
- Alexander, Herbert E. Financing the 1972 Election (1976) online
- Giglio, James N. (2009). "The Eagleton Affair: Thomas Eagleton, George McGovern, and the 1972 Vice Presidential Nomination". Presidential Studies Quarterly. 39 (4): 647–676. doi:10.1111/j.1741-5705.2009.03731.x.
- Graebner, Norman A. (1973). "Presidential Politics in a Divided America: 1972". Australian Journal of Politics and History. 19 (1): 28–47. doi:10.1111/j.1467-8497.1973.tb00722.x.
- Hofstetter, C. Richard; Zukin, Cliff (1979). "TV Network News and Advertising in the Nixon and McGovern Campaigns". Journalism & Mass Communication Quarterly. 56 (1): 106–152. doi:10.1177/107769907905600117. S2CID 144048423.
  - Hofstetter, C. Richard. Bias in the news: Network television coverage of the 1972 election campaign (Ohio State University Press, 1976) online
- Johnstone, Andrew, and Andrew Priest, eds. US Presidential Elections and Foreign Policy: Candidates, Campaigns, and Global Politics from FDR to Bill Clinton (2017) pp 203–228. online
- Miller, Arthur H., et al. "A majority party in disarray: Policy polarization in the 1972 election." American Political Science Review 70.3 (1976): 753–778; widely cited; online
- Nicholas, H. G. (1973). "The 1972 Elections". Journal of American Studies. 7 (1): 1–15. doi:10.1017/S0021875800012585. S2CID 145606732.
- Perry, James M. Us & them: how the press covered the 1972 election (1973) online
- Simons, Herbert W., James W. Chesebro, and C. Jack Orr. "A movement perspective on the 1972 presidential election." Quarterly Journal of Speech 59.2 (1973): 168–179. online
- Trent, Judith S., and Jimmie D. Trent. "The rhetoric of the challenger: George Stanley McGovern." Communication Studies 25.1 (1974): 11–18.
- White, Theodore H. (1973). The Making of the President, 1972. New York: Atheneum. ISBN 0-689-10553-3.

=== Primary sources ===
- Chester, Edward W. (1977). A guide to political platforms.
- Porter, Kirk H. and Donald Bruce Johnson, eds. National party platforms, 1840–1972 (1973)
