= 1972 United States presidential election in Rhode Island =

- November 7, 1972

Nominee	Richard Nixon	George McGovern
Party	Republican	Democratic
Home state	California	South Dakota
Running mate	Spiro Agnew	Sargent Shriver
Electoral vote	4	0
Popular vote	220,383	194,645
Percentage	53.00%	46.81%

Nixon
40–50%
50–60%
60–70%
McGovern
50–60%
President before election
Richard Nixon
Republican
Elected President
Richard Nixon
Republican

The 1972 United States presidential election in Rhode Island took place on November 7, 1972, as part of the 1972 United States presidential election. Voters chose four representatives, or electors, to the Electoral College, who voted for president and vice president.

Rhode Island voted for the Republican incumbent, Richard Nixon, over the Democratic challenger, South Dakota Senator George McGovern. Nixon took 53.00% of the vote to McGovern's 46.81%, a margin of 6.19%. However, this result made Rhode Island about 17% more Democratic than the nation as a whole. This was the second of three elections in which Rhode Island did not vote for the same candidate as neighboring Massachusetts, which recurred only in 1852 and 1980.

As of the 2024 presidential election, this is the last election in which Providence County voted for the Republican candidate, and Nixon won the county by only 186 votes. This is the most recent presidential election where a Republican presidential candidate was able to win every county in the state of Rhode Island.

Rhode Island would go on to vote Republican only once more since this election; in 1984, when Ronald Reagan narrowly won the state.

== Results ==
1972 United States presidential election in Rhode Island
Party	Candidate	Votes	Percentage	Electoral votes
Republican	Richard Nixon (incumbent)	220,383	53.00%	4
Democratic	George McGovern	194,645	46.81%	0
Socialist Workers	Linda Jenness	729	0.18%	0
American Independent	John G. Schmitz (write-in)	25	0.01%	0
People's	Benjamin Spock (write-in)	5	0.00%	0
Libertarian	John Hospers (write-in)	2	0.00%	0
Write-ins	Scattered (write-ins)	19	0.00%	0
Totals		415,808	100.00%	4
Voter turnout				—

=== By county ===
County	Richard Nixon Republican		George McGovern Democratic		Various candidates Other parties		Margin		Total votes cast
County	#	%	#	%	#	%	#	%	Total votes cast
Bristol	12,009	54.62%	9,928	45.16%	48	0.22%	2,081	9.46%	21,985
Kent	40,534	58.19%	29,004	41.64%	115	0.17%	11,530	16.55%	69,653
Newport	19,142	59.75%	12,844	40.09%	49	0.16%	6,298	19.66%	32,035
Providence	129,418	49.94%	129,232	49.87%	506	0.19%	186	0.07%	259,156
Washington	19,280	58.46%	13,637	41.35%	62	0.19%	5,643	17.11%	32,979
Totals	220,383	53.00%	194,645	46.81%	780	0.19%	25,738	6.19%	415,808

== See also ==
- United States presidential elections in Rhode Island
