= 1972 United States presidential election in Louisiana =

- November 7, 1972

Nominee	Richard Nixon	George McGovern
Party	Republican	Democratic
Home state	California	South Dakota
Running mate	Spiro Agnew	Sargent Shriver
Electoral vote	10	0
Popular vote	686,852	298,142
Percentage	65.32%	28.35%
Parish results
Nixon
40–50%
50–60%
60–70%
70–80%
80–90%
McGovern
40–50%
President before election
Richard Nixon
Republican
Elected President
Richard Nixon
Republican

The 1972 United States presidential election in Louisiana took place on November 7, 1972. All 50 states and the District of Columbia were part of the 1972 United States presidential election. State voters chose ten electors to the Electoral College, who voted for president and vice president.

Louisiana was won by the Republican nominees, incumbent President Richard Nixon of California and his running mate Vice President Spiro Agnew of Maryland. Nixon and Agnew defeated the Democratic nominees, Senator George McGovern of South Dakota and his running mate U.S. Ambassador Sargent Shriver of Maryland.

Nixon carried Louisiana with 65.32% of the vote to McGovern's 28.35%, a victory margin of 36.97%, making Louisiana 13.8% more Republican than the nation-at-large, and marking the strongest Republican presidential performance in Louisiana history. In a result that would reflect McGovern's national performance, the Democratic candidate only won one parish (West Feliciana) in Louisiana. As of the 2024 presidential election, this is the last election when Madison Parish, St. Helena Parish, East Carroll Parish, and the city of New Orleans (coterminous with Orleans Parish) have voted for a Republican presidential candidate.

With 4.95 percent of the popular vote, Louisiana would prove to be American Party candidate John G. Schmitz’ fifth strongest state after Idaho, Alaska, Utah and Oregon.

== Campaign ==
Among white voters, 77% supported Nixon while 15% supported McGovern.

== Results ==
1972 United States presidential election in Louisiana
Party	Candidate	Votes	%
Republican	Richard Nixon (inc.)	686,852	65.32%
Democratic	George McGovern	298,142	28.35%
American	John G. Schmitz	52,099	4.95%
Socialist Workers	Linda Jenness	14,398	1.37%
Total votes		1,051,491	100%

=== Results by parish ===
Parish	Richard Nixon Republican		George McGovern Democratic		John G. Schmitz American		Linda Jenness Socialist Workers		Margin		Total votes cast
Parish	#	%	#	%	#	%	#	%	#	%	Total votes cast
Acadia	9,698	63.83%	4,406	29.00%	820	5.40%	270	1.78%	5,292	34.83%	15,194
Allen	3,581	59.41%	2,029	33.66%	321	5.33%	97	1.61%	1,552	25.75%	6,028
Ascension	5,187	54.48%	3,324	34.91%	827	8.69%	183	1.92%	1,863	19.57%	9,521
Assumption	3,751	58.93%	2,065	32.44%	405	6.36%	144	2.26%	1,686	26.49%	6,365
Avoyelles	6,225	57.76%	3,395	31.50%	845	7.84%	313	2.90%	2,830	26.26%	10,778
Beauregard	4,955	69.41%	1,728	24.21%	343	4.80%	113	1.58%	3,227	45.20%	7,139
Bienville	3,384	58.99%	1,890	32.94%	388	6.76%	75	1.31%	1,494	26.05%	5,737
Bossier	12,856	78.63%	2,914	17.82%	445	2.72%	135	0.83%	9,942	60.81%	16,350
Caddo	47,215	71.68%	15,649	23.76%	2,685	4.08%	318	0.48%	31,566	47.92%	65,867
Calcasieu	24,778	57.72%	15,330	35.71%	2,368	5.52%	449	1.05%	9,448	22.01%	42,925
Caldwell	2,306	76.99%	508	16.96%	132	4.41%	49	1.64%	1,798	60.03%	2,995
Cameron	1,391	60.90%	739	32.36%	121	5.30%	33	1.44%	652	28.54%	2,284
Catahoula	2,683	73.15%	823	22.44%	74	2.02%	88	2.40%	1,860	50.71%	3,668
Claiborne	3,432	64.08%	1,551	28.96%	315	5.88%	58	1.08%	1,881	35.12%	5,356
Concordia	4,521	64.37%	2,142	30.50%	235	3.35%	125	1.78%	2,379	33.87%	7,023
DeSoto	4,017	56.16%	2,596	36.29%	454	6.35%	86	1.20%	1,421	19.87%	7,153
East Baton Rouge	52,648	65.37%	23,617	29.32%	3,558	4.42%	719	0.89%	29,031	36.05%	80,542
East Carroll	1,736	48.40%	1,661	46.31%	146	4.07%	44	1.23%	75	2.09%	3,587
East Feliciana	1,992	48.98%	1,603	39.41%	378	9.29%	94	2.31%	389	9.57%	4,067
Evangeline	5,523	60.03%	2,919	31.72%	597	6.49%	162	1.76%	2,604	28.31%	9,201
Franklin	4,967	73.76%	1,272	18.89%	368	5.46%	127	1.89%	3,695	54.87%	6,734
Grant	3,626	76.51%	859	18.13%	175	3.69%	79	1.67%	2,767	58.38%	4,739
Iberia	11,812	65.84%	5,143	28.67%	692	3.86%	293	1.63%	6,669	37.17%	17,940
Iberville	3,972	46.92%	3,650	43.11%	721	8.52%	123	1.45%	322	3.81%	8,466
Jackson	4,152	69.96%	1,477	24.89%	208	3.50%	98	1.65%	2,675	45.07%	5,935
Jefferson	75,348	73.99%	20,981	20.60%	4,320	4.24%	1,192	1.17%	54,367	53.39%	101,841
Jefferson Davis	5,903	65.96%	2,551	28.51%	392	4.38%	103	1.15%	3,352	37.45%	8,949
Lafayette	22,939	69.10%	8,740	26.33%	1,106	3.33%	413	1.24%	14,199	42.77%	33,198
Lafourche	13,936	67.20%	5,713	27.55%	724	3.49%	364	1.76%	8,223	39.65%	20,737
LaSalle	3,858	81.51%	651	13.75%	129	2.73%	95	2.01%	3,207	67.76%	4,733
Lincoln	6,736	69.15%	2,589	26.58%	325	3.34%	91	0.93%	4,147	42.57%	9,741
Livingston	7,481	72.96%	1,898	18.51%	672	6.55%	202	1.97%	5,583	54.45%	10,253
Madison	2,420	49.22%	2,249	45.74%	188	3.82%	60	1.22%	171	3.48%	4,917
Morehouse	5,770	66.94%	2,355	27.32%	397	4.61%	98	1.14%	3,415	39.62%	8,620
Natchitoches	6,994	64.74%	3,180	29.44%	471	4.36%	158	1.46%	3,814	35.30%	10,803
Orleans	88,075	54.55%	60,790	37.65%	9,811	6.08%	2,770	1.72%	27,285	16.90%	161,446
Ouachita	24,860	74.74%	6,920	20.80%	1,037	3.12%	446	1.34%	17,940	53.94%	33,263
Plaquemines	6,595	83.05%	990	12.47%	263	3.31%	93	1.17%	5,605	70.58%	7,941
Pointe Coupee	3,192	46.58%	3,133	45.72%	440	6.42%	88	1.28%	59	0.86%	6,853
Rapides	22,306	69.68%	8,422	26.31%	1,115	3.48%	168	0.52%	13,884	43.37%	32,011
Red River	2,245	65.95%	957	28.11%	176	5.17%	26	0.76%	1,288	37.84%	3,404
Richland	4,304	70.80%	1,335	21.96%	309	5.08%	131	2.15%	2,969	48.84%	6,079
Sabine	4,935	73.88%	1,332	19.94%	272	4.07%	141	2.11%	3,603	53.94%	6,680
St. Bernard	15,198	77.69%	3,189	16.30%	845	4.32%	331	1.69%	12,009	61.39%	19,563
St. Charles	5,469	60.42%	2,788	30.80%	591	6.53%	204	2.25%	2,681	29.62%	9,052
St. Helena	1,446	52.00%	943	33.91%	324	11.65%	68	2.45%	503	18.09%	2,781
St. James	3,112	49.47%	2,633	41.85%	451	7.17%	95	1.51%	479	7.62%	6,291
St. John the Baptist	3,525	49.75%	2,815	39.73%	609	8.59%	137	1.93%	710	10.02%	7,086
St. Landry	12,510	57.01%	7,421	33.82%	1,712	7.80%	302	1.38%	5,089	23.19%	21,945
St. Martin	6,337	62.00%	3,202	31.33%	492	4.81%	190	1.86%	3,135	30.67%	10,221
St. Mary	11,117	68.44%	4,435	27.30%	509	3.13%	182	1.12%	6,682	41.14%	16,243
St. Tammany	15,438	74.13%	3,949	18.96%	1,157	5.56%	281	1.35%	11,489	55.17%	20,825
Tangipahoa	11,607	62.89%	5,227	28.32%	1,307	7.08%	316	1.71%	6,380	34.57%	18,457
Tensas	1,729	50.47%	1,568	45.77%	101	2.95%	28	0.82%	161	4.70%	3,426
Terrebonne	13,753	71.70%	4,415	23.02%	716	3.73%	298	1.55%	9,338	48.68%	19,182
Union	4,322	70.20%	1,465	23.79%	248	4.03%	122	1.98%	2,857	46.41%	6,157
Vermilion	8,909	66.39%	3,876	28.88%	445	3.32%	190	1.42%	5,033	37.51%	13,420
Vernon	6,225	77.62%	1,345	16.77%	305	3.80%	145	1.81%	4,880	60.85%	8,020
Washington	8,162	66.92%	2,947	24.16%	895	7.34%	192	1.57%	5,215	42.76%	12,196
Webster	8,829	71.50%	2,859	23.15%	555	4.49%	106	0.86%	5,970	48.35%	12,349
West Baton Rouge	2,626	53.14%	1,849	37.41%	392	7.93%	75	1.52%	777	15.73%	4,942
West Carroll	2,997	77.24%	571	14.72%	214	5.52%	98	2.53%	2,426	62.52%	3,880
West Feliciana	1,001	42.13%	1,079	45.41%	258	10.86%	38	1.60%	-78	-3.28%	2,376
Winn	4,235	70.40%	1,490	24.77%	205	3.41%	86	1.43%	2,745	45.63%	6,016
Totals	686,852	65.32%	298,142	28.35%	52,099	4.95%	14,398	1.37%	388,710	36.97%	1,051,491

== See also ==
- United States presidential elections in Louisiana

== Works cited ==
- Black, Earl; Black, Merle (1992). The Vital South: How Presidents Are Elected. Harvard University Press. ISBN 0674941306.
