= Margaret Wright (American politician) =

American politician (1921–1996)

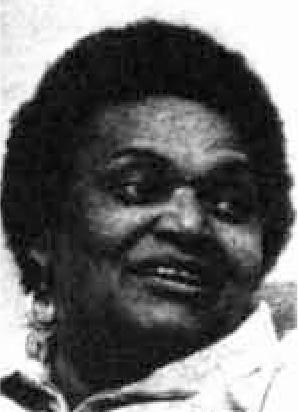
- Wright in 1976
- Born: Margaret Nusom; December 15, 1921
- Died: May 11, 1996 (aged 74)
- Occupations: Politician; community activist
- Political party: People's

Margaret Florence Wright (née Nusom; December 15, 1921 — May 11, 1996) was a third-party candidate for President of the United States and a community activist in Los Angeles, California.

Wright was a shipyard worker during World War II, and one of the principals of the film The Life and Times of Rosie the Riveter. In the 1976 United States presidential election, Wright represented the People's Party, and her running mate was Benjamin Spock, who had been their presidential candidate in 1972. Their ticket was also endorsed by the Peace and Freedom Party. Bumper stickers advertised her as a "Socialist for President." The ticket received 49,016 votes (0.06%). Wright was also a founder and activist of Women against Racism in the Watts section of Los Angeles.
