= 1972 United States presidential election in Pennsylvania =

- November 7, 1972

Nominee	Richard Nixon	George McGovern
Party	Republican	Democratic
Home state	California	South Dakota
Running mate	Spiro Agnew	Sargent Shriver
Electoral vote	27	0
Popular vote	2,714,521	1,796,951
Percentage	59.11%	39.13%

Nixon
50–60%
60–70%
70–80%
80–90%
90–100%
McGovern
50–60%
60–70%
70–80%
Tie/no data
President before election
Richard Nixon
Republican
Elected President
Richard Nixon
Republican

The 1972 United States presidential election in Pennsylvania took place on November 7, 1972, and was part of the 1972 United States presidential election. Voters chose 27 representatives, or electors, to the Electoral College, who voted for president and vice president.

Pennsylvania strongly voted for the Republican nominee, President Richard Nixon, over the Democratic nominee, Senator George McGovern. Nixon won Pennsylvania by a large margin of 19.98%, winning every county except for Philadelphia. This result nonetheless was over 3% more Democratic than the nation at large. As of the 2024 presidential election, this is the last election in which Allegheny County, which hosts Pittsburgh, voted Republican, as well as the last time when the Republican presidential nominee carried the state by double digits.

Nixon became the first Republican since Herbert Hoover in 1928 to carry the coal-mining, unionized Southwestern Pennsylvania Fayette County, Greene County, Washington County, and Westmoreland County.

== Results ==
1972 United States presidential election in Pennsylvania
Party	Candidate	Votes	Percentage	Electoral votes
Republican	Richard Nixon (incumbent)	2,714,521	59.11%	27
Democratic	George McGovern	1,796,951	39.13%	0
Constitution	John G. Schmitz	70,593	1.54%	0
Socialist Workers	Linda Jenness	4,639 (Note: Although these candidates are included in the “other” total from Dave Leip’s Atlas, they are not separated by county in any available data set.)	0.10%	0
Write-ins	Write-ins	2,715	0.06%	0
Communist	Gus Hall	2,686	0.06%	0
Totals		4,592,106	100.0%	27
Voter turnout (voting age/registered)				56%/78%

=== Results by county ===
County	Richard Nixon Republican		George McGovern Democratic		John G. Schmitz Constitutional		Various candidates Other parties		Margin		Total votes cast
County	#	%	#	%	#	%	#	%	#	%	Total votes cast
Adams	13,593	70.19%	5,529	28.55%	227	1.17%	16	0.08%	8,064	41.64%	19,365
Allegheny	371,737	55.60%	282,496	42.26%	12,491	1.87%	1,811	0.27%	89,241	13.34%	668,535
Armstrong	17,557	61.61%	10,490	36.81%	412	1.45%	39	0.14%	7,067	24.80%	28,498
Beaver	43,637	56.42%	31,570	40.82%	1,718	2.22%	412	0.53%	12,067	15.60%	77,337
Bedford	11,243	73.30%	3,836	25.01%	227	1.48%	32	0.21%	7,407	48.29%	15,338
Berks	66,172	62.35%	36,563	34.45%	3,130	2.95%	262	0.25%	29,609	27.90%	106,127
Blair	33,126	75.10%	10,023	22.72%	913	2.07%	48	0.11%	23,103	52.38%	44,110
Bradford	15,050	73.57%	5,204	25.44%	179	0.87%	25	0.12%	9,846	48.13%	20,458
Bucks	99,684	62.28%	56,784	35.48%	3,245	2.03%	346	0.22%	42,900	26.80%	160,059
Butler	29,665	65.09%	14,695	32.24%	1,075	2.36%	139	0.30%	14,970	32.85%	45,574
Cambria	43,825	60.05%	27,950	38.30%	894	1.23%	306	0.42%	15,875	21.75%	72,975
Cameron	1,935	68.45%	828	29.29%	48	1.70%	16	0.57%	1,107	39.16%	2,827
Carbon	11,639	59.05%	7,774	39.44%	274	1.39%	25	0.13%	3,865	19.61%	19,712
Centre	20,683	60.48%	13,194	38.58%	273	0.80%	47	0.14%	7,489	21.90%	34,197
Chester	72,726	68.44%	31,118	29.29%	2,281	2.15%	134	0.13%	41,608	39.15%	106,259
Clarion	10,073	67.96%	4,509	30.42%	193	1.30%	46	0.31%	5,564	37.54%	14,821
Clearfield	16,780	63.54%	9,246	35.01%	299	1.13%	84	0.32%	7,534	28.53%	26,409
Clinton	8,205	62.54%	4,772	36.37%	107	0.82%	35	0.27%	3,433	26.17%	13,119
Columbia	14,187	63.59%	7,222	32.37%	857	3.84%	43	0.19%	6,965	31.22%	22,309
Crawford	18,393	64.38%	9,371	32.80%	760	2.66%	45	0.16%	9,022	31.58%	28,569
Cumberland	42,099	72.87%	14,562	25.20%	1,010	1.75%	104	0.18%	27,537	47.67%	57,775
Dauphin	54,307	69.38%	22,587	28.86%	1,270	1.62%	106	0.14%	31,720	40.52%	78,270
Delaware	175,414	63.91%	94,144	34.30%	4,502	1.64%	391	0.14%	81,270	29.61%	274,451
Elk	7,900	61.20%	4,710	36.49%	245	1.90%	53	0.41%	3,190	24.71%	12,908
Erie	61,542	58.22%	42,022	39.75%	1,986	1.88%	163	0.15%	19,520	18.47%	105,713
Fayette	27,288	54.06%	22,475	44.52%	649	1.29%	67	0.13%	4,813	9.54%	50,479
Forest	1,374	71.75%	509	26.58%	21	1.10%	11	0.57%	865	45.17%	1,915
Franklin	24,093	70.01%	9,456	27.48%	808	2.35%	58	0.17%	14,637	42.53%	34,415
Fulton	2,515	66.24%	1,192	31.39%	86	2.26%	4	0.11%	1,323	34.85%	3,797
Greene	7,790	57.52%	5,562	41.07%	151	1.11%	40	0.30%	2,228	16.45%	13,543
Huntingdon	9,606	72.68%	3,394	25.68%	203	1.54%	13	0.10%	6,212	47.00%	13,216
Indiana	18,122	61.90%	10,833	37.01%	290	0.99%	29	0.10%	7,289	24.89%	29,274
Jefferson	11,631	68.92%	5,024	29.77%	204	1.21%	17	0.10%	6,607	39.15%	16,876
Juniata	4,412	66.32%	2,156	32.41%	61	0.92%	24	0.36%	2,256	33.91%	6,653
Lackawanna	58,838	56.11%	45,465	43.35%	495	0.47%	71	0.07%	13,373	12.76%	104,869
Lancaster	81,036	75.64%	24,223	22.61%	1,760	1.64%	119	0.11%	56,813	53.03%	107,138
Lawrence	23,712	56.06%	17,595	41.60%	832	1.97%	158	0.37%	6,117	14.46%	42,297
Lebanon	25,008	77.38%	6,683	20.68%	573	1.77%	56	0.17%	18,325	56.70%	32,320
Lehigh	58,023	62.39%	33,325	35.83%	1,518	1.63%	136	0.15%	24,698	26.56%	93,002
Luzerne	81,358	60.89%	51,128	38.27%	973	0.73%	147	0.11%	30,230	22.62%	133,606
Lycoming	28,913	68.70%	11,999	28.51%	1,058	2.51%	117	0.28%	16,914	40.19%	42,087
McKean	11,958	71.72%	4,513	27.07%	176	1.06%	26	0.16%	7,445	44.65%	16,673
Mercer	27,961	59.37%	18,087	38.40%	985	2.09%	67	0.14%	9,874	20.97%	47,100
Mifflin	9,989	72.10%	3,667	26.47%	169	1.22%	30	0.22%	6,322	45.63%	13,855
Monroe	12,701	67.51%	5,619	29.87%	450	2.39%	44	0.23%	7,082	37.64%	18,814
Montgomery	173,662	64.31%	91,959	34.06%	3,960	1.47%	437	0.16%	81,703	30.25%	270,018
Montour	4,386	69.64%	1,755	27.87%	152	2.41%	5	0.08%	2,631	41.77%	6,298
Northampton	41,822	56.30%	32,335	43.53%	93	0.13%	31	0.04%	9,487	12.77%	74,281
Northumberland	25,912	64.16%	13,885	34.38%	541	1.34%	47	0.12%	12,027	29.78%	40,385
Perry	8,082	73.31%	2,731	24.77%	197	1.79%	15	0.14%	5,351	48.54%	11,025
Philadelphia	344,096	43.89%	431,736	55.07%	5,925	0.76%	2,213	0.28%	-87,640	-11.18%	783,970
Pike	4,568	74.79%	1,385	22.68%	143	2.34%	12	0.20%	3,183	52.11%	6,108
Potter	4,422	70.91%	1,710	27.42%	81	1.30%	23	0.37%	2,712	43.49%	6,236
Schuylkill	44,071	61.56%	26,077	36.42%	1,261	1.76%	186	0.26%	17,994	25.14%	71,595
Snyder	7,308	78.20%	1,834	19.63%	190	2.03%	13	0.14%	5,474	58.57%	9,345
Somerset	19,739	68.44%	8,743	30.31%	303	1.05%	56	0.19%	10,996	38.13%	28,841
Sullivan	1,886	67.17%	885	31.52%	32	1.14%	5	0.18%	1,001	35.65%	2,808
Susquehanna	9,476	67.79%	4,154	29.72%	328	2.35%	21	0.15%	5,322	38.07%	13,979
Tioga	10,028	72.05%	3,733	26.82%	142	1.02%	15	0.11%	6,295	45.23%	13,918
Union	6,905	73.57%	2,278	24.27%	158	1.68%	44	0.47%	4,627	49.30%	9,385
Venango	13,991	67.28%	6,302	30.31%	474	2.28%	27	0.13%	7,689	36.97%	20,794
Warren	10,018	66.05%	4,877	32.16%	252	1.66%	20	0.13%	5,141	33.89%	15,167
Washington	42,587	54.00%	34,781	44.10%	1,119	1.42%	375	0.48%	7,806	9.90%	78,862
Wayne	8,948	74.51%	2,733	22.76%	311	2.59%	17	0.14%	6,215	51.75%	12,009
Westmoreland	75,085	54.60%	59,322	43.13%	2,814	2.05%	306	0.22%	15,763	11.47%	137,527
Wyoming	6,423	74.42%	2,112	24.47%	86	1.00%	10	0.12%	4,311	49.95%	8,631
York	63,606	68.19%	27,520	29.50%	1,953	2.09%	201	0.22%	36,086	38.69%	93,280
Totals	2,714,521	59.11%	1,796,951	39.13%	70,593	1.54%	10,040	0.22%	917,570	19.98%	4,592,105

== See also ==
- United States presidential elections in Pennsylvania
