= 1972 United States presidential election in Arizona =

- November 7, 1972

Nominee	Richard Nixon	George McGovern
Party	Republican	Democratic
Home state	California	South Dakota
Running mate	Spiro Agnew	Sargent Shriver
Electoral vote	6	0
Popular vote	402,812	198,540
Percentage	61.64%	30.38%
County results
Nixon
40–50%
50–60%
60–70%
McGovern
50–60%
President before election
Richard Nixon
Republican
Elected President
Richard Nixon
Republican

The 1972 United States presidential election in Arizona took place on November 7, 1972, as part of the 1972 United States presidential election. State voters chose six representatives, or electors, to the Electoral College, who voted for president and vice president.

Arizona was won by incumbent President Richard Nixon (R–California), with 61.64% of the popular vote, against George McGovern (D–South Dakota), with 30.38% of the popular vote. Socialist Workers Party electors and John G. Schmitz, the only other candidates on the ballot, combined for just over 52,000 votes and over seven percent of Arizona's popular vote. Even in a huge landslide, this result left Arizona exactly 8% more Republican than the nation at-large.

In a state that would reflect McGovern's national results, the Democratic nominee won only one county in Arizona: heavily unionized Greenlee County, where no Republican had won before this nor would win until George W. Bush in 2000.

The massive surge in ballots for the Socialist candidate (there had been only 85 in 1968, now there were nearly 31,000) was due to a ballot error in Pima County. Linda Jenness, the Socialist Workers candidate, was only 31, and thus was deemed ineligible to be put on the ballot. Instead, the names of her six electors were listed. However, the layout of the ballot was what caused the confusion. Atop the ballot was "President of the United States (Vote for one)" with the given options of Nixon, McGovern, and Schmitz. Below that was "Presidential Electors (Vote for six)," and the names of the six Socialist Workers' electors. The text labelling the as "Socialist Workers' Party" was only half as small as the instructions to vote for six, and thus 28,000 voters followed both instructions, likely perceiving the Socialist electors as being part of a separate race. The Secretary of State, Wesley Bolin, and Attorney General, Gary Nelson, at first agreed the ballots ought to be thrown out. Pima County election chief David O'Hern and county attorney Rose Silver believed the ballots should be counted since the Socialist Workers candidate had been disqualified. In the end, that was the line of thinking taken, and the votes were counted for both the candidates they were cast for. This resulted not only in an increase in the state's total by some 28,000, but that in some Democratic southside precincts, the Socialist ticket outperformed Nixon and was the only place the landslide victor came third anywhere in the country.

== Results ==
General election results
Party	Candidate	Votes	%
Republican Party	Richard Nixon (incumbent), for President	402,812	61.64%
Democratic Party	George McGovern, for President	198,540	30.38%
Socialist Workers Party	Timothy Joseph Clennon, for Presidential Elector	30,945	4.74
Socialist Workers Party	Betsy Ann McDonald, for Presidential Elector	30,140	4.61
Socialist Workers Party	Alberta J. Dannells, for Presidential Elector	30,036	4.60
Socialist Workers Party	Lois M. Turner, for Presidential Elector	29,612	4.53
Socialist Workers Party	Eleanor Voris, for Presidential Elector	29,519	4.52
Socialist Workers Party	Bradley Wells Tracy, for Presidential Elector	29,470	4.51
American Independent Party	John G. Schmitz, for President	21,208	3.22
Total votes		653,505 (Note: This number is higher than the total number of ballots cast due to the SWP ballot defect. The total number of ballots cast was 648,061.)	100.00%
Registered voters/Turnout		861,809	75.20%

=== Results by county ===
County	Richard Nixon Republican		George McGovern Democratic		Linda Jenness Socialist Workers		John G. Schmitz American Independent		Margin		Total votes cast
County	#	%	#	%	#	%	#	%	#	%	Total votes cast
Apache	3,394	50.28%	3,145	46.59%	11	0.16%	200	2.96%	249	3.69%	6,750
Cochise	11,706	63.97%	6,023	32.91%	13	0.07%	557	3.04%	5,683	31.06%	18,299
Coconino	10,611	61.02%	6,250	35.94%	15	0.09%	313	1.82%	4,361	25.38%	17,389
Gila	5,673	54.70%	4,295	41.41%	7	0.07%	397	3.83%	1,378	13.29%	10,372
Graham	3,575	60.15%	1,863	31.35%	1	0.02%	504	8.48%	1,712	28.80%	5,943
Greenlee	1,758	45.57%	2,013	52.18%	6	0.16%	81	2.10%	-255	-6.61%	3,858
Maricopa	244,593	69.29%	95,135	26.95%	273	0.08%	12,999	3.68%	149,458	42.34%	353,000
Mohave	6,755	68.92%	2,588	26.41%	9	0.09%	449	4.58%	4,167	42.51%	9,801
Navajo	6,999	60.48%	4,003	34.59%	9	0.08%	561	4.85%	2,996	25.89%	11,572
Pima	73,154	45.41%	56,223	34.90%	29,113 (Note: In this county there occurred a ballot malfunction that counted many votes for both a major party candidate and Linda Jenness. A court ordered that the ballots be counted for both.)	18.07%	2,620	1.63%	16,931	10.51%	161,110
Pinal	10,584	60.28%	6,404	36.47%	16	0.09%	555	3.16%	4,180	23.81%	17,559
Santa Cruz	2,137	52.39%	1,866	45.75%	3	0.07%	73	1.79%	271	6.64%	4,079
Yavapai	12,277	65.77%	3,977	21.30%	1,466	7.85%	947	5.07%	8,300	44.47%	18,667
Yuma	9,596	63.52%	4,755	31.48%	3	0.02%	752	4.98%	4,841	32.04%	15,106
Totals	402,812	61.64%	198,540	30.38%	30,945	4.74%	21,208	3.25%	204,272	31.26%	653,505

=== Electors ===
Electors were chosen by their party's voters in primary elections held on September 12, 1972.

George McGovern & Sargent Shriver Democratic Party	Richard Nixon & Spiro Agnew Republican Party	No Candidate (Note: Linda Jenness was disqualified from the ballot in Arizona due to not meeting the constitutional age requirement) & Andrew Pulley Socialist Workers Party	John G. Schmitz & Thomas J. Anderson American Independent Party
Shirley Angle; Jacqueline Ashford; Amelia D. Lewis; Bruce B. Masony; Michael M. Sophy; Lloyd Vacovsky	Lenora Claridge; Jane W. Drees; Helen M. Ely; Ross F. Jones; Orme Lewis Sr.; Marion R. Sundt	Timothy Joseph Clennon; Alberta J. Dannells; Betsy Ann McDonald; Bradley Wells Tracy; Lois M. Turner; Eleanor Voris	Lyndon Larson; Jerry Minnus; Delwyn Myers; Eugene Pyle; Russell Reason; Clifford Titus
