= 1972 United States presidential election in Connecticut =

- November 7, 1972
- Turnout: 85.5%

Nominee	Richard Nixon	George McGovern
Party	Republican	Democratic
Home state	California	South Dakota
Running mate	Spiro Agnew	Sargent Shriver
Electoral vote	8	0
Popular vote	810,763	555,498
Percentage	58.57%	40.13%

Nixon
40–50%
50–60%
60–70%
70–80%
McGovern
50–60%
60–70%
President before election
Richard Nixon
Republican
Elected President
Richard Nixon
Republican

The 1972 United States presidential election in Connecticut took place on November 7, 1972. All 50 states and the District of Columbia were part of the 1972 United States presidential election. Connecticut voters chose eight electors to the Electoral College, who voted for president and vice president.

Connecticut was won by the Republican nominees, incumbent President Richard Nixon of California and his running mate Vice President Spiro Agnew of Maryland. Nixon and Agnew defeated the Democratic nominees, Senator George McGovern of South Dakota and his running mate U.S. Ambassador Sargent Shriver of Maryland.

Nixon carried Connecticut with 58.57% of the vote to McGovern's 40.13%, a victory margin of 18.44%. He won every county in the state, but this result nonetheless made Connecticut almost 5% more Democratic than the nation-at-large.

Nixon's victory was the first of five consecutive Republican victories in the state, as Connecticut would not be won by a Democratic candidate again until Bill Clinton in 1992, after which the state has always gone Democratic.

To date, this is the last time that the cities of Bridgeport and New London voted Republican.

== Results ==
1972 United States presidential election in Connecticut
Party	Candidate	Votes	Percentage	Electoral votes
Republican	Richard Nixon (incumbent)	810,763	58.57%	8
Democratic	George McGovern	555,498	40.13%	0
American Independent	John G. Schmitz	17,239	1.25%	0
Write-ins	Write-ins	777	0.06%	0
Totals		1,384,277	100.00%	8
Voter turnout				-

=== By county ===
County	Richard Nixon Republican		George McGovern Democratic		Various candidates Other parties		Margin		Total votes cast
County	#	%	#	%	#	%	#	%	Total votes cast
Fairfield	233,188	64.00%	125,128	34.34%	6,050	1.66%	108,060	29.66%	364,366
Hartford	194,095	52.09%	174,837	46.93%	3,654	0.98%	19,258	5.16%	372,586
Litchfield	43,478	60.20%	27,929	38.67%	812	1.13%	15,549	21.53%	72,219
Middlesex	33,249	57.90%	23,573	41.05%	602	1.05%	9,676	16.85%	57,424
New Haven	200,818	59.01%	135,132	39.71%	4,373	1.28%	65,686	19.30%	340,323
New London	58,516	63.40%	32,935	35.68%	850	0.92%	25,581	27.72%	92,301
Tolland	25,798	56.45%	19,505	42.68%	394	0.87%	6,293	13.77%	45,697
Windham	21,621	56.04%	16,459	42.66%	504	1.30%	5,162	13.38%	38,584
Totals	810,763	58.57%	555,498	40.13%	18,016	1.30%	255,265	18.44%	1,384,277

==== By congressional district ====
Nixon won all 6 congressional districts.

District	Richard Nixon Republican		George McGovern Democratic		John G. Schmitz Independent		Scattering		Total votes cast	Representative
District	#	%	#	%	#	%	#	%	Total votes cast	Representative
1st	121,196	50.90%	114,473	48.07%	2,304	0.97%	149	0.06%	238,122	William R. Cotter
2nd	127,923	59.33%	85,382	39.61%	2,157	1.00%	136	0.06%	215,598	Robert H. Steele
3rd	142,569	61.00%	87,766	37.56%	3,254	1.39%	130	0.05%	233,719	Robert Giaimo
4th	138,496	61.85%	81,802	36.54%	3,485	1.56%	114	0.05%	223,897	Stewart McKinney
5th	144,149	61.20%	87,747	37.25%	3,532	1.50%	132	0.05%	235,560	John Monagan
6th	136,430	57.47%	98,328	41.42%	2,507	1.06%	116	0.05%	237,381	Ella Grasso
Totals	810,763	58.57%	555,498	40.13%	17,239	1.25%	777	0.06%	1,384,277	

== See also ==
- United States presidential elections in Connecticut
