= 1972 United States presidential election in Delaware =

- November 7, 1972

| Nominee | Richard Nixon | George McGovern |
| Party | Republican | Democratic |
| Home state | California | South Dakota |
| Running mate | Spiro Agnew | Sargent Shriver |
| Electoral vote | 3 | 0 |
| Popular vote | 140,357 | 92,283 |
| Percentage | 59.60% | 39.18% |

Nixon
40–50%
50–60%
60–70%
70–80%
McGovern
50–60%
60–70%
70–80%
President before election
Richard Nixon
Republican
Elected President
Richard Nixon
Republican

The 1972 United States presidential election in Delaware took place on November 7, 1972. All 50 states and the District of Columbia were part of the 1972 United States presidential election. State voters chose three electors to the Electoral College, who voted for president and vice president.

Delaware was won by the Republican nominees, incumbent President Richard Nixon of California and his running mate Vice President Spiro Agnew of Maryland. Nixon and Agnew defeated the Democratic nominees, Senator George McGovern of South Dakota and his running mate U.S. Ambassador Sargent Shriver of Maryland.

Nixon carried Delaware with 59.60% of the vote to McGovern's 39.18%, a victory margin of 20.42%, which made Delaware almost 3% more Democratic than the nation-at-large.

Despite Nixon's landslide victory in the state, incumbent Republican Senator J. Caleb Boggs was unexpectedly defeated for reelection by 29-year-old New Castle County councilman Joe Biden in the concurrent Senate election in Delaware. Biden would be elected president himself 48 years later.

== Results ==
1972 United States presidential election in Delaware
| Party | Candidate | Votes | % |
|---|---|---|---|
| Republican | Richard Nixon | 140,357 | 59.60% |
| Democratic | George McGovern | 92,283 | 39.18% |
| American | John G. Schmitz | 2,638 | 1.12% |
| Prohibition | E. Harold Munn | 238 | 0.10% |
| Total votes | | 235,516 | 100.00% |

=== Results by county ===
| County | Richard Nixon Republican | | George McGovern Democratic | | Various candidates Other parties | | Margin | | Total votes cast |
| County | # | % | # | % | # | % | # | % | Total votes cast |
|---|---|---|---|---|---|---|---|---|---|
| Kent | 17,712 | 62.03% | 10,463 | 36.64% | 381 | 1.33% | 7,249 | 25.39% | 28,556 |
| New Castle | 100,681 | 58.21% | 70,190 | 40.58% | 2,085 | 1.21% | 30,491 | 17.63% | 172,956 |
| Sussex | 21,964 | 64.59% | 11,630 | 34.20% | 410 | 1.21% | 10,334 | 30.39% | 34,004 |
| Totals | 140,357 | 59.60% | 92,283 | 39.18% | 2,876 | 1.22% | 48,074 | 20.42% | 235,516 |

== See also ==
- United States presidential elections in Delaware
