= Nationwide opinion polling for the 1972 United States presidential election =

This article provides a list of scientific, nationwide public opinion polls that were conducted relating to the 1972 United States presidential election.

== Presidential election ==
=== Richard Nixon vs George McGovern ===
Poll source	Date(s) administered	Richard Nixon (R)	George McGovern (D)	George Wallace (A) (Note: It remained an open question far into the election season whether Wallace would again bolt the Democratic Party and run as an Independent candidate in the General should he fail to win the Democratic nomination, with some polls being commissioned as though it were a fait accompli.)	Other	Undecided	Margin
Harris	February, 1971	45%	34%	12%	—	9%	11
Harris	April, 1971	46%	36%	13%	—	5%	10
Harris	May, 1971	47%	33%	11%	—	9%	14
Harris	August 24–27, 1971	48%	33%	13%	—	6%	15
Harris	November, 1971	49%	31%	12%	—	8%	18
Gallup	Feb. 4–7, 1972	49%	34%	11%	—	6%	15
Harris	Feb. 28 – Mar. 7, 1972	53%	28%	13%	—	6%	25
Harris	Feb. 28 – Mar. 7, 1972	59%	32%	-	—	9%	27
Harris	Apr. 1–7, 1972	47%	29%	16%	—	8%	18
Harris	Apr. 1–7, 1972	54%	34%	-	—	12%	20
Gallup	Apr. 15–16, 1972	46%	31%	15%	—	8%	15
Gallup	Apr. 21–24, 1972	45%	32%	16%	—	7%	13
Gallup	Apr. 28 – May 1, 1972	43%	35%	15%	—	7%	8
Harris	May 9–10, 1972	40%	35%	17%	—	8%	5
Harris	May 9–10, 1972	48%	41%	-	—	11%	7
Gallup	May 26–29, 1972	43%	30%	19%	—	8%	13
Gallup	May 26–29, 1972	53%	34%	-	—	13%	19
Harris	Jun. 7–12, 1972	45%	33%	17%	—	5%	12
Harris	Jun. 7–12, 1972	54%	38%	-	—	8%	16
Gallup	Jun. 16–19, 1972	45%	32%	18%	—	5%	13
Gallup	Jun. 16–19, 1972	53%	37%	-	—	10%	16
Harris	Jul. 1–6, 1972	55%	35%	-	—	10%	20
July 10–13: Democratic National Convention
Gallup	July 14–17, 1972	56%	37%	-	—	7%	19
Harris	Aug. 2–3, 1972	57%	34%	-	—	9%	23
Gallup	Aug. 4–7, 1972	57%	31%	-	—	12%	26
August 21–23: Republican National Convention
Gallup	Aug. 25–28, 1972	61%	36%	-	—	3%	25
Harris	Aug. 30 – Sept. 1, 1972	63%	29%	-	-	8%	34
Harris	Sept. 19–21, 1972	59%	31%	-	-	10%	28
Gallup	Sept. 22–25, 1972	61%	33%	-	1%	5%	28
Harris	Oct. 3–5, 1972	60%	33%	-	-	7%	27
Gallup	Sept. 29 – Oct. 9, 1972	60%	34%	-	1%	5%	26
Gallup	Oct. 13–16, 1972	59%	36%	-	-	5%	23
Harris	Oct. 17–19, 1972	59%	34%	-	-	7%	25
Harris	Oct. 24–26, 1972	60%	32%	-	-	8%	28
Gallup	Nov. 2–4, 1972	61%	35%	-	1%	3%	26
Harris	Nov. 2–4, 1972	59%	35%	-	-	6%	24
Election Results	Nov. 7, 1972	60.67%	37.52%	-	1.81%	-	23.15

=== Richard Nixon vs George McGovern (Post-Election) ===
Poll source	Date(s) administered	Richard Nixon (R)	George McGovern (D)	Other	Undecided	Margin
Gallup	June 22–25, 1973	46%	40%	5%	9%	6

== Hypothetical Polling ==
=== Richard Nixon vs George Wallace ===
Poll source	Date(s) administered	Richard Nixon (R)	George Wallace (D)	Eugene McCarthy (I)	Other	Undecided	Margin
Gallup	March 24–27, 1972	69%	23%	-	—	8%	46
Harris	May 9–10, 1972	47%	21%	22%	—	10%	26
Harris	May 9–10, 1972	59%	24%	-	—	17%	35
Harris	June 7–12, 1972	64%	24%	-	—	12%	40

=== Richard Nixon vs Hubert Humphrey ===
Poll source	Date(s) administered	Richard Nixon (R)	Hubert Humphrey (D)	George Wallace (A)	Other	Undecided	Margin
Harris	May 20–26, 1969	51%	33%	11%	—	5%	18
Harris	July 30 – August 3, 1969	48%	39%	9%	—	4%	9
Gallup	September 11–16, 1969	53%	33%	11%	—	3%	20
Harris	October, 1969	51%	36%	9%	—	4%	15
Harris	November 16–21, 1969	48%	37%	12%	—	3%	11
Gallup	January 30 – February 2, 1970	50%	33%	13%	—	4%	17
Harris	February 9–14, 1970	52%	33%	9%	—	6%	19
Gallup	February 27 – March 2, 1970	54%	34%	12%	—	7%	20
Harris	September 7–14, 1970	48%	39%	10%	—	3%	9
Harris	November 14–19, 1970	46%	39%	11%	—	4%	7
Gallup	January 8–11, 1971	48%	38%	10%	—	4%	10
Gallup	March 11–14, 1971	46%	36%	12%	—	6%	10
Harris	April, 1971	42%	41%	13%	—	4%	1
Harris	May 10–15, 1971	44%	39%	10%	—	7%	5
Gallup	May 14–17, 1971	42%	39%	12%	—	7%	3
Gallup	August 19–24, 1971	43%	37%	11%	—	9%	6
Harris	August 24–27, 1971	45%	36%	12%	—	7%	9
Harris	November, 1971	45%	36%	12%	—	7%	9
Gallup	November 19–22, 1971	47%	37%	12%	—	4%	10
Harris	January, 1972	46%	37%	12%	—	5%	9
Gallup	February 4–7, 1972	46%	39%	10%	—	5%	7
Harris	February 8–14, 1972	47%	36%	12%	—	5%	11
Harris	February 28 – March 7, 1972	48%	35%	12%	—	5%	13
Harris	February 28 – March 7, 1972	53%	37%	-	—	10%	16
Gallup	March 24–27, 1972	46%	35%	15%	—	4%	11
Gallup	March 24–27, 1972	53%	39%	-	—	8%	14
Harris	April 1–7, 1972	42%	36%	16%	—	6%	6
Gallup	April 28 – May 1, 1972	45%	34%	15%	—	6%	11
Harris	May 9–10, 1972	41%	37%	16%	—	6%	4
Harris	May 9–10, 1972	50%	42%	-	—	8%	8
Gallup	May 26–29, 1972	43%	26%	22%	—	9%	17
Harris	June 7–12, 1972	47%	31%	17%	—	5%	16
Harris	June 7–12, 1972	58%	34%	-	—	8%	24
Gallup	June 16–19, 1972	47%	28%	18%	—	7%	19

=== Richard Nixon vs Edmund Muskie ===
Poll source	Date(s) administered	Richard Nixon (R)	Edmund Muskie (D)	George Wallace (A)	Other	Undecided	Margin
Harris	May 20–26, 1969	51%	32%	11%	—	6%	19
Harris	July 30 – August 3, 1969	47%	38%	9%	—	6%	9
Gallup	August 19–24, 1971	42%	36%	11%	—	11%	6
Gallup	September 11–16, 1969	49%	34%	11%	—	6%	15
Harris	October, 1969	51%	35%	9%	—	5%	16
Harris	November 16–21, 1969	49%	35%	11%	—	5%	14
Gallup	January 30 – February 2, 1970	47%	35%	13%	—	5%	12
Harris	February 9–14, 1970	49%	35%	9%	—	7%	14
Harris	April, 1970	47%	36%	10%	—	7%	11
Harris	May 8–10, 1970	42%	38%	12%	—	8%	4
Harris	May 8–10, 1970	48%	46%	-	—	6%	2
Gallup	June 18 – June 23, 1970	43%	36%	13%	—	8%	7
Harris	September 7–14, 1970	43%	43%	10%	—	4%	0
Harris	November 14–19, 1970	40%	46%	10%	—	4%	6
Gallup	December 3–8, 1970	44%	43%	9%	—	4%	1
Gallup	January 8–11, 1971	44%	44%	9%	—	3%	0
Gallup	January 8–11, 1971	48%	46%	-	—	6%	2
Harris	January 16–20, 1971	40%	43%	11%	—	6%	3
Harris	January 16–20, 1971	46%	49%	-	—	5%	3
Harris	February, 1971	39%	44%	12%	—	5%	5
Harris	February, 1971	42%	48%	-	—	10%	6
Gallup	March 11–14, 1971	43%	39%	12%	—	6%	4
Harris	April, 1971	39%	47%	11%	—	3%	8
Harris	April, 1971	44%	50%	-	—	6%	6
Harris	May 10–15, 1971	40%	42%	11%	—	7%	2
Gallup	May 14–17, 1971	39%	41%	12%	—	8%	2
Harris	June, 1971	40%	42%	13%	—	5%	2
Harris	June, 1971	46%	46%	-	—	8%	0
Harris	August 24–27, 1971	43%	41%	12%	—	4%	2
Harris	August 24–27, 1971	48%	46%	-	—	8%	2
Harris	September 23 – October 1, 1971	47%	35%	11%	—	7%	12
Harris	September 23 – October 1, 1971	50%	40%	-	—	10%	10
Gallup	October 8–11, 1971	43%	35%	13%	—	9%	8
Harris	November, 1971	43%	39%	11%	—	7%	4
Gallup	November 19–22, 1971	44%	41%	10%	—	5%	3
Gallup	January 7–10, 1972	43%	42%	12%	—	3%	1
Harris	January, 1972	42%	42%	11%	—	5%	0
Harris	January, 1972	45%	48%	-	—	8%	3
Gallup	February 4–7, 1972	43%	42%	10%	—	5%	1
Harris	February 8–14, 1972	44%	40%	11%	—	5%	4
Harris	February 8–14, 1972	47%	45%	-	—	8%	2
Harris	February 28 – March 7, 1972	47%	35%	12%	—	6%	12
Harris	February 28 – March 7, 1972	50%	37%	-	—	13%	13
Gallup	March 24–27, 1972	46%	36%	14%	—	4%	10
Gallup	March 24–27, 1972	52%	41%	-	—	7%	11
Harris	April 1–7, 1972	44%	33%	15%	—	8%	11
Gallup	April 28 – May 1, 1972	46%	30%	16%	—	8%	16
Harris	June 7–12, 1972	49%	28%	18%	—	5%	21
Harris	June 7–12, 1972	59%	33%	-	—	8%	26

=== Richard Nixon vs Scoop Jackson ===
Poll source	Date(s) administered	Richard Nixon (R)	Scoop Jackson(D)	George Wallace (A)	Other	Undecided	Margin
Harris	September 24 – October 1, 1971	54%	24%	13%	—	9%	30
Harris	April 1–7, 1972	51%	21%	17%	—	11%	30

=== Richard Nixon vs John Lindsay ===
Poll source	Date(s) administered	Richard Nixon (R)	John Lindsay (D)	George Wallace (A)	Other	Undecided	Margin
Harris	November 16–21, 1969	51%	29%	12%	—	8%	22
Harris	February 9–14, 1970	50%	31%	10%	—	9%	19
Gallup	June 18 – June 23, 1970	46%	29%	15%	—	10%	17
Harris	September 7–14, 1970	47%	36%	10%	—	7%	11
Harris	November 14–19, 1970	45%	37%	12%	—	6%	8
Harris	February, 1971	44%	36%	13%	—	7%	8
Gallup	August 19–24, 1971	45%	30%	12%	—	13%	15
Harris	August 24–27, 1971	48%	33%	13%	—	6%	15
Harris	September 24 – October 1, 1971	50%	31%	11%	—	8%	19
Harris	November, 1971	49%	31%	12%	—	8%	18
Gallup	February 4–7, 1972	53%	29%	12%	—	6%	24
Harris	February 28 – March 7, 1972	58%	22%	13%	—	7%	36
Harris	February 28 – March 7, 1972	64%	26%	-	—	10%	38

=== Richard Nixon vs Eugene McCarthy ===
Poll source	Date(s) administered	Richard Nixon (R)	Eugene McCarthy(D)	George Wallace (A)	Other	Undecided	Margin
Harris	November 16–21, 1969	54%	27%	11%	—	8%	27
Gallup	January 30 – February 2, 1970	55%	24%	12%	—	9%	31
Harris	September 24 – October 1, 1971	56%	26%	11%	—	7%	30

=== Richard Nixon vs Edward Kennedy ===
Poll source	Date(s) administered	Richard Nixon (R)	Edward Kennedy (D)	George Wallace (A)	Other	Undecided	Margin
Gallup	April 10–15, 1969	52%	33%	10%	—	5%	19
Harris	May 20–26, 1969	46%	37%	11%	—	6%	9
Harris	May 20–26, 1969	54%	40%	-	—	6%	14
Harris	July 30 – August 3, 1969	48%	38%	8%	—	6%	10
Gallup	September 11–16, 1969	53%	31%	10%	—	6%	22
Harris	October, 1969	54%	30%	9%	—	7%	24
Harris	November 16–21, 1969	50%	33%	11%	—	6%	17
Gallup	January 30 – February 2, 1970	49%	35%	11%	—	5%	14
Harris	November 14–19, 1970	45%	39%	11%	—	5%	6
Gallup	January 8–11, 1971	47%	38%	9%	—	6%	9
Gallup	March 11–14, 1971	46%	38%	11%	—	5%	8
Gallup	May 14–17, 1971	42%	41%	12%	—	8%	1
Harris	July, 1971	44%	36%	N/A	—	N/A	8
Gallup	August 19–24, 1971	43%	38%	10%	—	9%	5
Harris	August 24–27, 1971	48%	37%	11%	—	4%	11
Harris	September 24 – October 1, 1971	45%	38%	11%	—	6%	7
Harris	November, 1971	45%	37%	11%	—	7%	8
Gallup	November 19–22, 1971	44%	41%	10%	—	5%	3
Gallup	February 4–7, 1972	47%	39%	9%	—	5%	8
Harris	April 1–7, 1972	45%	35%	14%	—	6%	10
Gallup	April 14–17, 1972	46%	36%	12%	—	6%	10
Harris	June 7–12, 1972	43%	37%	16%	—	4%	6
Harris	June 7–12, 1972	53%	41%	-	—	6%	12
Gallup	October 1–21, 1972	52%	43%	-	—	5%	9

=== Richard Nixon vs Harold Hughes ===
Poll source	Date(s) administered	Richard Nixon (R)	Harold Hughes (D)	George Wallace (A)	Other	Undecided	Margin
Harris	February, 1971	50%	25%	14%	—	11%	25

=== Nelson Rockefeller vs Edmund Muskie ===
Poll source	Date(s) administered	Nelson Rockefeller (R)	Edmund Muskie (D)	George Wallace (A)	Other	Undecided	Margin
Harris	February, 1971	23%	54%	14%	—	9%	31

=== Richard Nixon vs Edmund Muskie vs. George Wallace vs. Eugene McCarthy ===
Poll source	Date(s) administered	Richard Nixon (R)	Edmund Muskie (D)	George Wallace (A)	Eugene McCarthy (I)	Other	Undecided	Margin
Harris	July, 1971	37%	35%	12%	10%	—	6%	2
Harris	February 8–14, 1972	42%	36%	10%	8%	—	4%	6

=== Richard Nixon vs Edmund Muskie vs. George Wallace vs. John Lindsay ===
Poll source	Date(s) administered	Richard Nixon (R)	Edmund Muskie(D)	George Wallace (A)	John Lindsay (I)	Other	Undecided	Margin
Harris	May, 1971	36%	40%	10%	11%	—	3%	4

=== Richard Nixon vs Edward Kennedy vs. George Wallace vs. John Lindsay ===
Poll source	Date(s) administered	Richard Nixon (R)	Edward Kennedy(D)	George Wallace (A)	John Lindsay (I)	Other	Undecided	Margin
Harris	July, 1971	39%	28%	11%	16%	—	6%	11
