= H. G. Nicholas =

Welsh historian and academic

Herbert George Nicholas, FBA (1911–1998) was a Welsh historian and academic. He was the Rhodes Professor of American History and Institutions at the University of Oxford from 1969 to 1978, and was also a fellow of New College, Oxford, from 1951 to 1978.

He had been educated at New College and Yale where he studied as a Commonwealth Fund Fellow from 1935 to 1937 and had been a lecturer (from 1938) and fellow (1946 to 1951) of Exeter College, Oxford. During World War Two he worked at the Ministry of Information's American Division. He was both a fellow of Nuffield College, Oxford, and a Nuffield Reader in the Comparative Study of Institutions from 1956 to 1969. He was elected a fellow of the British Academy in 1969 and served as its vice-president from 1975 to 1976.
