= James Chesebro =

American academic (1944–2020)

James W. Chesebro
- Born: June 24, 1944; Minneapolis
- Died: January 21, 2020 (aged 75)
- Occupation: Professor
- Title: Distinguished Professor of Telecommunications
- Spouse: Donald G. Bonsall

Academic work
- Discipline: Communication

James W. Chesebro (June 24, 1944 - January 21, 2020) was Distinguished Professor of Telecommunications in the Department of Telecommunications at Ball State University. He received his Ph.D. from the University of Minnesota in 1972.

Chesebro played a key role in renaming the Speech Communication Association to the National Communication Association in 1996 to better reflect the intellectual diversity of its members and promote public understanding of the association. He was committed to integrating multiculturalism into the communication discipline, and his advocacy significantly shaped the direction of the association during his tenure.

== Previous educational institutions ==
Chesebro taught at several institutions, including:

- Indiana State University
- North Dakota State University
- Ball State University
- George Mason University
- Queens College of the City University of New York
- University of Puerto Rico
- Temple University
- University of Minnesota
- Concordia College

== Specialization ==
In the discipline of communication, Chesebro specialized in the study of media as symbolic and cognitive systems. From 1966, he maintained a sustained focus on dramatistic theory, methods and criticism with specific applications to television and computer-mediated communication. From 1981, this orientation was extended to all media systems, with conceptual attention devoted to media literacy and media technologies as communication and cognitive systems, a perspective reflected in both his teaching and research.

== Professional service ==
- President of the Eastern Communication Association (1982–1983)
- Editor of Communication Quarterly (1985–1987)
- Chair of the NCA's Publications Board (1986–1988)
- Director of Education Services, National Office of the National Communication Association, July 1989 to July 1992
- President of the National Communication Association (1996)
- Editor of the NCA journal Critical Studies in Media Communication (1999–2001)
- Editor of the National Communication Association (NCA) online journal Review of Communication (2004–2006)

== Books ==
Chesebro published several books, including

- Public Policy Decision-Making: Systems Analysis and Comparative Advantages Debate (Harper & Row, 1973)
- Orientations to Public Communication (Science Research Associates, 1976)
- Gayspeak: Gay Male and Lesbian Communication (Pilgrim Press, 1981)
- Computer-Mediated Communication: Human Relationships in a Computerized World (University of Alabama Press, 1989)
- Analyzing Media: Communication Technologies as Symbolic and Cognitive Systems (Guilford Press, 1996)
- Extensions of the Burkeian System (University of Alabama Press, 2006)
- Methods of Rhetorical Criticism: A Twentieth-Century Perspective (Roxbury, 2007)
- A Century of Transformation: Studies in the Honor of the 100th Anniversary of the ECA (Oxford University Press, 2009)
- Communicating Gender and Power (Waveland Press, 2011)

== Articles ==
Chesebro published over 100 articles in communication journals such as the Quarterly Journal of Speech, Critical Studies in Mass Communication, Communication Monographs, Communication Education and Text and Performance Quarterly as well as the Journal of Popular Culture and the computer science journal Intel's Innovator.

== Awards ==
Chesebro received numerous awards throughout his career, including:

- NCA's Golden Anniversary Award for the outstanding monograph of the year 1985.
- NCA's Samuel L. Becker Distinguished Service Award 1997.
- Robert J. Kibler Memorial Award for "demonstrated dedication to excellence, commitment to the profession, concern for others, visions of what could be, acceptance of diversity, and forthrightness" 2001.
- Everett Lee Hunt Award for Outstanding Scholarship, presented by the Eastern Communication Association in 1989 and 1997.
- Kenneth Burke Society's Life-Time Achievement Award, 1999.

The Eastern Communication Association presented him with its most prestigious awards including its Everett Lee Hunt Scholarship Award in 1989 and again in 1997, identified him as one of its Distinguished Research Fellows in 1996 and Distinguished Teaching Fellows in 1998. In 1993, he received the National Kenneth Burke Society's Distinguished Service Award and its National Kenneth Burke Society's Life-Time Achievement Award 1999. At Indiana State University, he was awarded the President's Medal for "exemplary performance as a faculty member" in 1999 and was identified as the 2001 Distinguished Professor of the College of Arts and Sciences.
