= James M. Perry =

American journalist

James Moorhead Perry (1927–2016) was a 20th-century American journalist and author, who rose to prominence as a political reporter and columnist for the National Observer (1962–1977), and as the chief political reporter and correspondent of the Wall Street Journal (1977–1997). He was an analyst and critic of American politics, political journalism and military history.

== Origins, education and early life ==
James Moorhead Perry was born August 21, 1927, in Elmira, New York, and grew up in Philadelphia, Pennsylvania.

Perry credited his interest in journalism to the influence of his stepbrother, William H. Whyte, (a reporter for the business magazine Fortune; later author of the best-seller The Organization Man, a prominent book analyzing corporate conformity of the 1950s).

At the end of World War II, Perry served in the U.S. Marines. He graduated from Trinity College in Hartford, Connecticut, in 1950, with a B.A. in English. He worked at the college as news editor of The Trinity Tripod and on the staff of the Ivy.

Perry married Margaret Pancoast, September 18, 1954, remaining married until her death in 2011. They had two daughters.

== Early career ==
Perry began his journalism career at the Marine Corps publication, Leatherneck Magazine. Before his graduation from Trinity, he had been a stringer for the Hartford Courant; but after graduating, went to the rival Hartford Times for what he jokingly described as mercenary reasons—for an offer of "$45," ten dollars more than offered by the Courant. Perry's subsequent journalism career included work at the Philadelphia Bulletin.

== National Observer career ==
Starting in 1962—at the National Observer, a weekly published by Dow Jones—until it closed in 1977. His Observer column "Politics by Perry" continued for nearly a decade. While working for the Observer, he was present at the 1963 assassination of President John F. Kennedy, and reported on it. As a reporter, he often traveled in the entourage of presidents traveling abroad.

== Wall Street Journal career ==
After the National Observer ended publication in 1977, Perry became the chief political reporter for America's principal business newspaper: the influential, conservative, New York City-based Wall Street Journal. He continued in that role, eventually rising to an editor, and chief political correspondent, by the time of his retirement in 1997.

== Journalistic style, values and practices ==
Perry was noted by other journalists for a perceptive, frank, fair and forthright style, relatively free of wild pontificating, and unaffected by others' political gamesmanship and showmanship. Unlike other leading national political reporters of his era, Perry refrained from personal publicity (including television appearances). Perry avoided developing personal relationships with the leaders he reported upon—believing such relationships were contrary to the proper role and perspective of a journalist. Although most of his career was at prominent conservative publications, Perry, himself, was not overtly partisan. However, Perry distrusted and decried ignorance in leaders, journalists and voters, particularly any lack of political literacy or ignorance of history (especially political history).

== Other writings ==
Perry was an early inside analyst and public critic of the U.S. journalistic establishment. He wrote books about the shortcomings of the media, about how poll-driven marketing reshaped American politics, and about costly fiascoes in the military throughout history. As an amateur historian and as an enthusiast about topics of the U.S. Civil War, Perry returned to book-writing toward the end of his career with the Journal.

Following his retirement from the Journal, Perry was a blogger, and wrote commentary on various topics—some of which has been used in journalism courses. For the Pittsburgh Post-Gazette, he wrote various columns on political and social topics—titled "Perry on Politics"—and a detailed remembrance of the Kennedy assassination.

== Retirement years ==
Perry retired to Chevy Chase, Maryland, and Glenora, New York. He died November 23, 2016—reportedly from complications of heart and vascular disease—at a hospital in Washington, D.C. (one source says Chevy Chase), at age 89.

== Recognition ==
- Fourth Estate Award for lifetime achievement, 1997, National Press Club
- Perry's works are recommended reading by various academic institutions, including:
  - the Columbia School of Journalism;
  - the United States Army War College.
  - Dickinson College;

== Books ==
External videos
- Booknotes interview with Perry on The Bohemian Brigade, May 21, 2000, C-SPAN
- Presentation by Perry on The Bohemian Brigade, June 6, 2000, C-SPAN
- Presentation by Perry on Touched by Fire, November 8, 2003, C-SPAN

- Barry Goldwater: A New Look at a Presidential Candidate, (1964: National Observer)
- The New Politics: The Expanding Technology of Political Manipulation (1968) – an analysis of how modern campaign-management professionals, pollsters and data processors, produce impersonal-but-targeted campaigns, fundamentally altering modern politics.
- Us & Them: How the Press Covered the 1972 Election (1973), analysis of media folly on the campaign trail—ridiculing media preoccupation with trivia and insider stories, while missing major economic and other forces actually shaping election outcomes.
- Arrogant Armies: Great Military Disasters and the Generals Behind Them (1996) -- analyzed the loss of life resulting from reckless military adventurism over many centuries, criticizing nearly every major power for reckless, overconfident assumptions, defective intelligence and political bumbling.
- A Bohemian Brigade: The Civil War Correspondents Mostly Rough, Sometimes Ready (2000) -- analysis of the origins of modern journalism in the U.S. Civil War—positive and negative—and their effect upon public opinion.
- Touched With Fire: Five Presidents and the Civil War Battles That Made Them (2003) -- a recounting of U.S. Civil War battles that involved and affected five future U.S. presidents Ulysses S. Grant, Benjamin Harrison, Rutherford B. Hayes, James A. Garfield, and William McKinley.
