= People's Party (United States, 1971) =

Former political party in the United States

- Leader: Several
- Founded: 1971
- Dissolved: 1977
- Split from: Peace and Freedom Party; Human Rights Party; Liberty Union Party; Other minor parties
- Succeeded by: Citizens Party
- Ideology: Democratic socialism Left-wing populism Progressivism; Radical feminism
- Political position: Left-wing
- Colors: Red

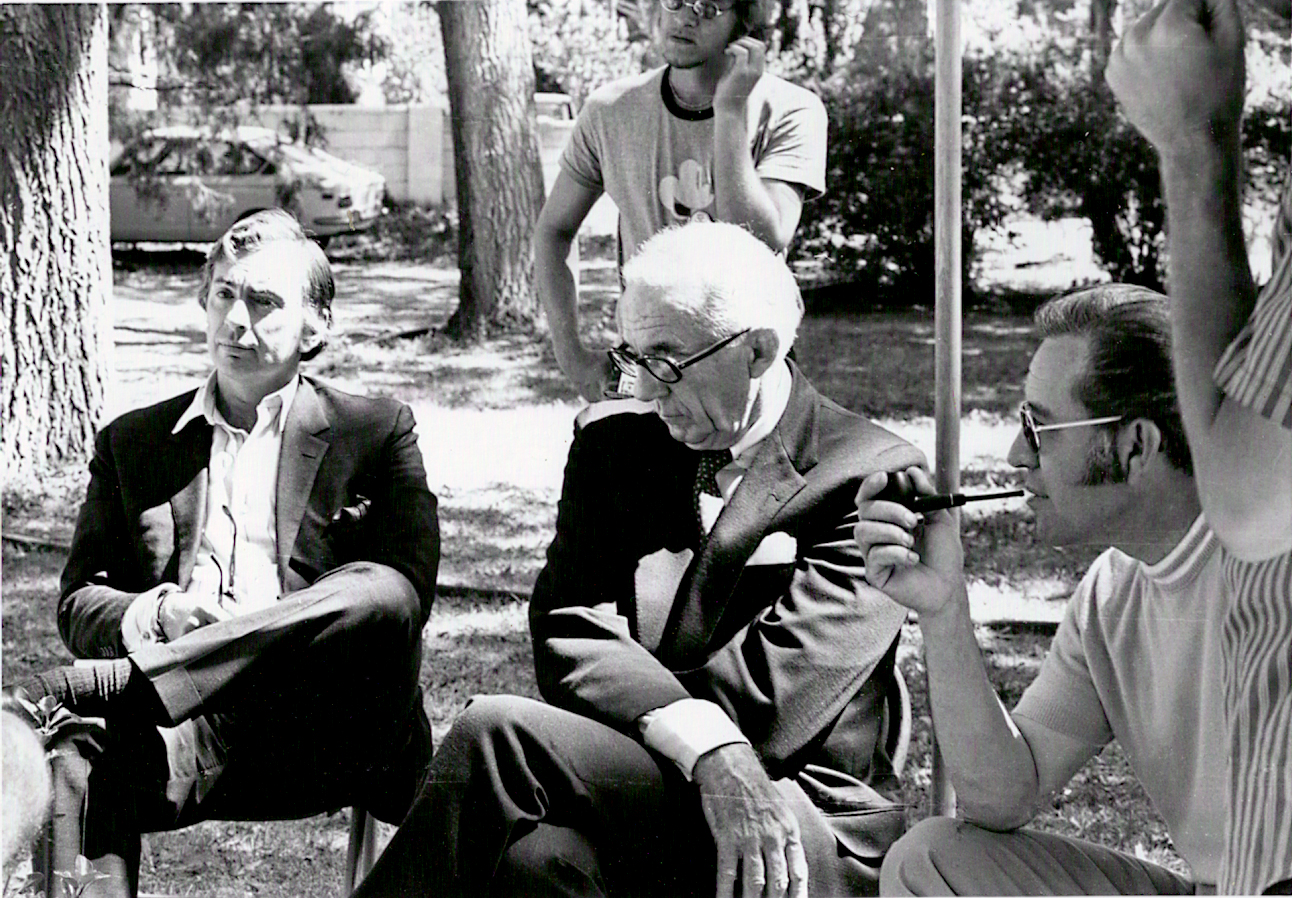
Gore Vidal and Dr Benjamin Spock, Vice-President and Presidential candidates, People's Party convention, Arizona. (Near Tempe, I believe.)

The People's Party was a political party in the United States, founded in 1971 by various individuals and state and local political parties, including the Peace and Freedom Party, Commongood People's Party, Country People's Caucus, Human Rights Party, Liberty Union, New American Party, New Party (Arizona), and No Party. The party's goal was to present a united anti-war platform for the coming election.

The People's Party fielded candidates for the presidency two times: First in the 1972 US presidential election with Dr. Benjamin Spock (an American pediatrician and author of parenting books) as their candidate; then the party contested the 1976 US presidential election, with Margaret Wright as their candidate. Dr. Spock was the Party's candidate for vice president in 1976.

After the election, the party moved to become a loose coalition, but was soon defunct, with most of its founding parties also dissolved.

The party's papers are now in the Western Historical Manuscript Collection of the University of Missouri–St. Louis, St. Louis, Missouri, having been where the party had held its conventions.

After dissolution, many members joined the Citizens Party.

== History ==
=== 1972 election ===
The People's Party ran Dr. Benjamin Spock for president and Julius Hobson for vice president in the 1972 U.S. presidential election. The party platform included free medical care, legalized abortion, legalized marijuana, a guaranteed minimum wage, the withdrawal of American troops from all foreign countries, a guaranteed maximum wage, and promoting toleration of homosexuality. Dr. Spock and the People's Party received 78,759 votes (0.10%).

In 1976, Spock was the party's vice presidential candidate.

=== Greer v. Spock ===
In 1972, Spock, Hobson, Linda Jenness (Socialist Workers Party presidential candidate), and Socialist Workers Party vice presidential candidate Andrew Pulley wrote to Major General Bert A. David, commanding officer of Fort Dix, asking for permission to distribute campaign literature and to hold an election-related campaign meeting. On the basis of Fort Dix regulations 210-26 and 210-27, General David refused the request. Spock, Hobson, Jenness, Pulley, and others then filed a case that ultimately made its way to the United States Supreme Court (424 U.S. 828—Greer, Commander, Fort Dix Military Reservation, et al., v. Spock et al.), which ruled against the plaintiffs. Greer v. Spock was, according to Professor Joshua E. Kastenberg, part of the Burger Court's jurisprudence of insulating the military from non-mainstream political influences. As Spock and his contemporaries had been outspoken against the United States involvement in the Vietnam War, there was a fear that he would influence soldiers to refuse to comply with orders to deploy into combat.

=== 1976 election ===
In 1976, the People's Party ran Margaret Wright as its nominee for president and Spock this time as its nominee for vice president (after Maggie Kuhn declined the spot). The People's Party received 49,016 votes (0.06%). The initial Wright–Kuhn ticket (which notably featured two female nominees) had been selected at the party's national convention, held September 1975 in St. Louis, Missouri.

== Election results ==
=== Presidential elections ===
Year	Presidential candidate	Vice presidential candidate	Popular votes	%	Electoral votes	Result	Ballot access	Notes	Ref
1972	Benjamin Spock	Julius Hobson	78,759	0.10%	0	Lost			
1976	Margaret Wright	Benjamin Spock	49,013	0.06%	0	Lost			

== See also ==
- American Left
- Democratic Socialists of America
- Green Party of the United States
- History of left-wing politics in the United States
