= Linda Jenness =

American activist (born 1941)

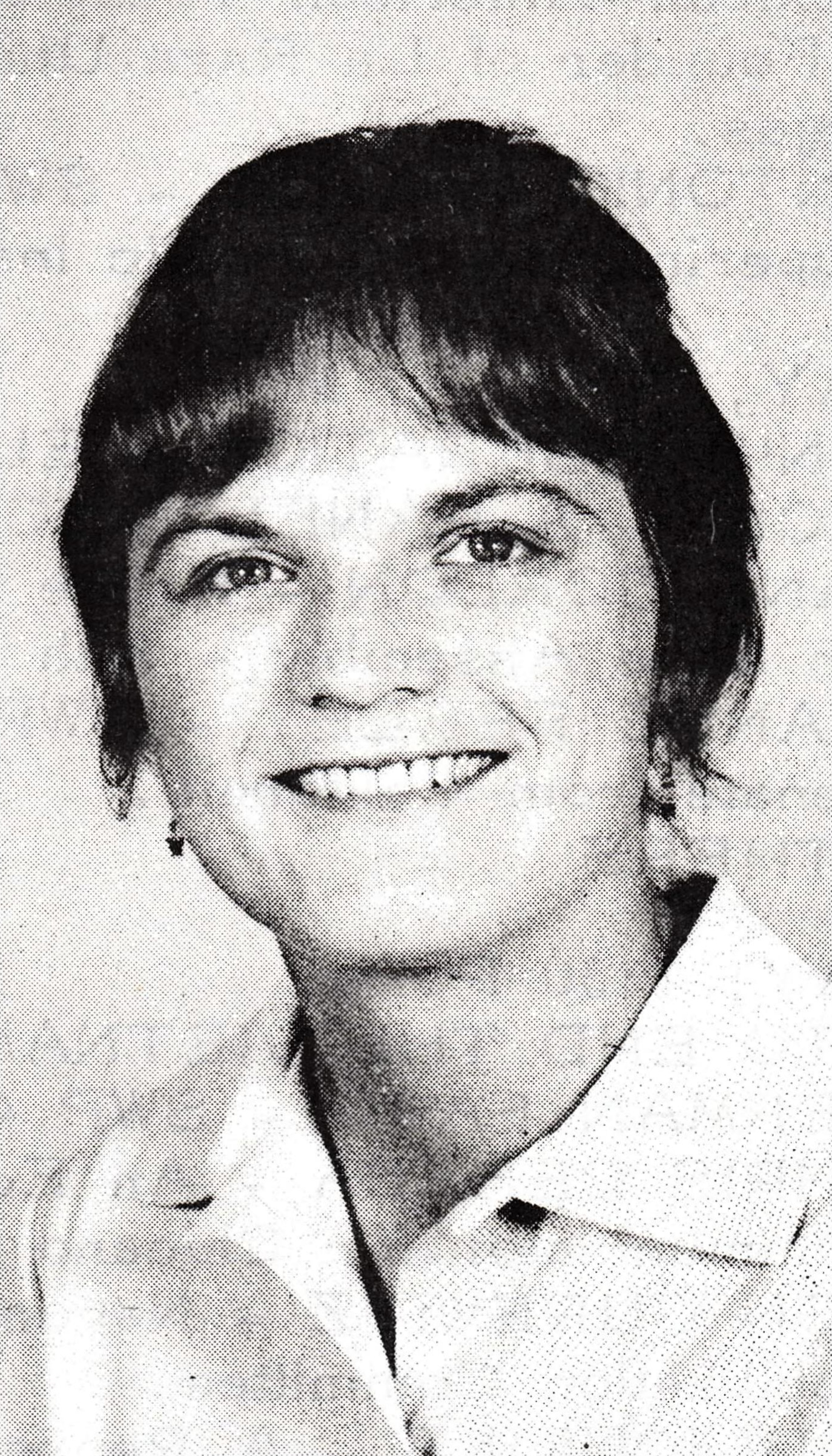
- Jenness c. 1970
- Born: 1941 (age 84–85); Atlanta, Georgia, U.S.
- Political party: Socialist Workers

Linda Jenness (born January 11, 1941) is a former Socialist Workers Party (SWP) candidate for president of the United States. She was the party's nominee in the 1972 election. She finished fourth in the general election, with 83,380 votes to 47,169,911 for the winner, Richard Nixon. (Note: In Arizona, Pima and Yavapai counties had a ballot malfunction that counted many votes for both a major party candidate and Linda Jenness. A court ordered that the ballots be counted for both. As a consequence, Jenness received 16% and 8% of the vote in Pima and Yavapai, respectively. 30,579 of her 30,945 Arizona votes are from those two counties. Some sources don't count these votes for Jenness.)

== Biography ==
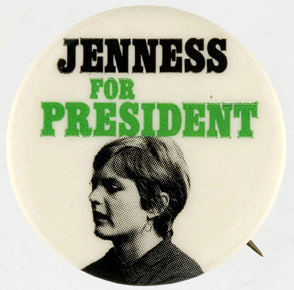
In 1972, Jenness ran for President of the United States under the banner of the Socialist Workers Party.

Jenness was the SWP nominee for governor of Georgia in 1970. She did not get on the ballot because she could not collect the required 88,175 signatures. Jenness, the SWP, and two congressional candidates of the party brought a lawsuit, Jenness v. Fortson, 403 U.S. 431 (1971), regarding Georgia's ballot access standards, a case an SWP supporter has said "continues to haunt the jurisprudence of ballot access law" (Raskin 2003, page 103). Jenness was also involved in the case 26 F.C.C.2d 485 (1970), regarding media coverage of third-party candidates.

In 1972, Jenness, vice-presidential nominee Andrew Pulley, and People's Party nominees Benjamin Spock and Julius Hobson wrote to Major General Bert A. David, commanding officer of Fort Dix in New Jersey, asking for permission to distribute campaign literature and hold an election-related campaign meeting. Based on Fort Dix regulations 210–26 and 210–27, David refused the request. The case made its way to the United States Supreme Court (424 U.S. 828—Greer, Commander, Fort Dix Military Reservation, et al., v. Spock et al.), which ruled against the plaintiffs.

Aged 31 at time of the election, Jenness did not meet the Constitutional age requirement for the presidency, but the SWP was on the ballot in 25 states—six more than in 1968. She qualified for the Ohio ballot but was removed when she could not prove she was 35.

As of 2010, Jenness was still an active supporter of the SWP. She is also a feminist. In the April 27, 1973, issue of The Militant, she wrote that feminism "is where women are out fighting for things that are in their interest. Feminism is wherever women are challenging the traditional roles assigned to them."

== Books ==
Jenness has authored several books and pamphlets, or provided introductions. Some of these are:

- Jenness, Linda, and Fidel Castro (1970). Woman & The Cuban Revolution New York: Pathfinder Press.
- Jenness, Linda (1972). Socialism and democracy; a speech by Linda Jenness, Socialist Workers Party candidate for president, 1972. New York: Pathfinder Press ISBN 0-87348-280-8
- Jenness, Linda (1973). Feminism and Socialism. New York: Pathfinder Press ISBN 1-199-12398-6
- Jenness, Linda, and Andrew Pulley (1973). Introduction to Watergate: The View from the Left - Unpublicized Facts About Government Attacks on Dissenters and the Socialists; Strategy for Fighting Back New York: Pathfinder Press
- Jenness, Linda (1975). Last Hired, First Fired: Affirmative Action VS. Seniority

== See also ==
- List of female United States presidential and vice presidential candidates

== Notes ==
Party political offices
Preceded by Fred Halstead	Socialist Workers Party nominee for President of the United States; 1972	Succeeded by Peter Camejo
