= Elections in the District of Columbia =

Elections in the District of Columbia are held to fill various district and federal seats. The District of Columbia holds general elections every two years to fill various D.C. government offices, including mayor, attorney general, members of the D.C. Council, members of the D.C. State Board of Education, and members of its Advisory Neighborhood Commissions. Special elections may be held to fill vacancies at other points in time. Additionally, citywide ballot measures may be proposed and voted on.

== Procedure ==
Elections in the District of Columbia are administered by the D.C. Board of Elections.

== Elected offices ==
=== Federal ===
United States presidential election results for Washington, D.C.
Year	Republican		Democratic		Third party(ies)	
Year	No.	%	No.	%	No.	%
1964	28,801	14.50%	169,796	85.50%	0	0.00%
1968	31,012	18.18%	139,566	81.82%	0	0.00%
1972	35,226	21.56%	127,627	78.10%	568	0.35%
1976	27,873	16.51%	137,818	81.63%	3,139	1.86%
1980	23,313	13.41%	130,231	74.89%	20,345	11.70%
1984	29,009	13.73%	180,408	85.38%	1,871	0.89%
1988	27,590	14.30%	159,407	82.65%	5,880	3.05%
1992	20,698	9.10%	192,619	84.64%	14,255	6.26%
1996	17,339	9.34%	158,220	85.19%	10,167	5.47%
2000	18,073	8.95%	171,923	85.16%	11,898	5.89%
2004	21,256	9.34%	202,970	89.18%	3,360	1.48%
2008	17,367	6.53%	245,800	92.46%	2,686	1.01%
2012	21,381	7.28%	267,070	90.91%	5,313	1.81%
2016	12,723	4.09%	282,830	90.86%	15,715	5.05%
2020	18,586	5.40%	317,323	92.15%	8,447	2.45%
2024	21,076	6.47%	294,185	90.28%	10,608	3.26%

==== President ====
Since the enactment of the 23rd amendment to the Constitution in 1961, the District of Columbia has participated in 16 presidential elections. The amendment states that it cannot have any more electoral votes than the state with the smallest number of electors. Since then, it has been allocated three electoral votes in every presidential election. In each of the 16 presidential elections, the district has overwhelmingly voted for the Democratic candidate, with no margin less than 56.5 percentage points. It has been won by the losing candidate in 9 of the 16 elections. In 2016, Donald Trump, the Republican candidate who would win the election eventually, received fewer total votes in the District than the third-party candidates combined.

In the 2000 presidential election, Barbara Lett-Simmons, an elector from the district, left her ballot blank to protest its lack of voting representation in Congress. As a result, Al Gore received only two of the three electoral votes from Washington, D.C.

The district is a signatory of the National Popular Vote Interstate Compact, an interstate compact in which signatories award all of their electoral votes to the winner of the national-level popular vote in a presidential election, even if another candidate won an individual signatory's popular vote. As of 2025, it has not yet gone into force.

==== Congress ====
According to the Article One of the Constitution, only states may be represented in the United States Congress. The District of Columbia is not a U.S. state and therefore has no voting representation.

In 1970, Congress enacted the District of Columbia Delegate Act, which established the District of Columbia's at-large congressional district and permitted residents to elect a non-voting delegate to the House of Representatives. Nearly 100 years prior in the 1870s, the congressional district briefly existed before Congress abolished it in favor of direct rule.

The majority of residents want the district to become a state and gain full voting representation in Congress. To prepare for this goal, the district has elected shadow representatives and shadow senators since 1990. The shadow congresspeople emulate the role of representing the district in the House and Senate and push for statehood alongside the House delegate.

=== District ===
==== Mayor ====
The enactment of the District of Columbia Home Rule Act in 1973 provided for an elected mayor for the first time in nearly a century. Starting in 1974, there have been thirteen elections for mayor and six people have held the office. The Democratic Party has immense political strength in the district. In each of the mayoral elections, the district has solidly voted for the Democratic candidate, with no margin less than 14 percentage points.

The mayor serves a four-year term. In 1994, residents approved a ballot measure limiting the mayor to two consecutive terms, despite simultaneously electing Marion Barry to his fourth term. In 2001, the D.C. Council repealed the measure, abolishing term limits for all elected positions.

==== Attorney General ====
The Attorney General for the District of Columbia is an elected office.

==== D.C. Council ====
The Council of the District of Columbia is the elected legislative body of the city. Members serve four year terms.

==== D.C. Board of Education ====
The D.C. State Board of Education is an elected executive agency of the D.C. government that is responsible for managing the district's public education. Members serve four-year terms.

==== Advisory Neighborhood Commissions ====
Advisory Neighborhood Commissions (ANCs) are bodies of local government in the district. The ANC system was created in 1974 through a referendum (73 percent voted "yes") in the District of Columbia Home Rule Act. The first elections for Advisory Neighborhood Commissioners were held in the fall of 1975, and commissions began operating in 1976. Congressman Don Fraser (D-Minn) and D.C. resident Milton Kotler helped to draft the ANC language in the Home Rule Act based on the success of Adams Morgan Organization (AMO) in Adams Morgan and on a 1970 report of the Minneapolis Citizen League, as well as on related neighborhood corporations in Pittsburgh; Brooklyn, New York; Chicago; and Columbus, Ohio.

ANCs consider a wide range of policies and programs affecting their neighborhoods, including traffic, parking, recreation, street improvements, liquor licenses, zoning, economic development, police protection, sanitation and trash collection, and the district's annual budget. Commissioners serve two-year terms and receive no salary, but commissions do receive funds for the general purpose of improving their area and hiring staff. This policy has come under scrutiny because of the misuse of funds by commissioners and their employees. Candidates can accept campaign donations up to $25 per person.

As of 2023, ANCs represent more than 100 neighborhoods.

== Voting rights and voter powers ==
=== Ballot measures ===
The district has had a system of direct voting since 1979, shortly after it gained home rule in 1973. Residents have the ability to place new legislation, or legislation recently passed by the city council, on the ballot for a popular vote. The district has three types of ballot measures that can be voted on in a general election: District Charter amendments, initiatives and referendums. In order to be placed on the ballot, supporters of a measure must gather signatures from registered voters.

Since adopting this process, ballot measures have become a common part of the city's electoral system. As of 2022, more than 150 different initiatives had been filed with the district, along with a significantly smaller number of referendums; of those, only 29 have met the required qualifications to be placed on the ballot. Ballot measures have been used to legalize politically contentious policies such as local term limits, abolition of the tipped minimum wage, cannabis use, and advancements in the District of Columbia statehood movement.

=== Non-citizen voting ===
D.C. has allowed non-citizen residents, regardless of immigration status, to vote in local elections since February 23, 2023. Non-citizen D.C. residents are only eligible to vote in elections for local offices (Mayor of the District of Columbia, members of the D.C. Council, Attorney General for the District of Columbia, members of the State Board of Education, and members of Advisory Neighborhood Commissions) and on local initiatives, referendums, and amendments to the D.C. Charter. Non-citizens cannot vote in elections for any federal offices.

== Political parties ==
The District of Columbia recognizes four major political parties:

- District of Columbia Democratic State Committee, an affiliate of the U.S. Democratic Party
- District of Columbia Republican Party, an affiliate of U.S. Republican Party
- D.C. Statehood Green Party, an affiliate of the Green Party of the United States
- Libertarian Party of the District of Columbia, an affiliate of U.S. Libertarian Party

To be a major party, it must be eligible to conduct a primary election, and to be eligible, a political party must have received 7,500 cumulative votes for mayor, for councillor, for attorney general, or for U.S. presidential electors in the most recent general election. The district has a closed primary system, meaning that a voter may only participate in a political party's primary if they are a registered member of that party (typically the 21st day) before the primary.

Minor political parties do not meet those qualifications or are established for the first time, and they may only participate in general elections. They include the Socialist Workers Party of the District of Columbia, an affiliate of the U.S. Socialist Workers Party which last participated in the 2020 general election, and the Umoja Party, which last participated in the 2000 general election.

=== Party strength ===
The Democratic State Committee dominates district politics. The city only ever elected a Democratic mayor and attorney general, only ever voted for the Democratic candidate for all of its federal offices, and elects the maximum number of Democratic candidates to its city council.

== See also ==
- Electoral history of Marion Barry
