= United States presidential elections in the District of Columbia =

Presidential elections in the District of Columbia
- Number of elections: 16
- Voted Democratic: 16
- Voted Republican: 0
- Voted other: 0
- Voted for winning candidate: 7
- Voted for losing candidate: 9

Since the enactment of the 23rd amendment to the Constitution in 1961, the District of Columbia has participated in 16 presidential elections. The amendment states that it cannot have any more electoral votes than the state with the smallest number of electors. Since then, it has been allocated three electoral votes in every presidential election. The Democratic Party has immense political strength in the district. In each of the 16 presidential elections, the district has overwhelmingly voted for the Democratic candidate, with no margin less than 56.5 percentage points. It has been won by the losing candidate in 9 of the 16 elections. In 2016, Donald Trump, the Republican candidate who would win the election eventually, received fewer total votes in the District than the third-party candidates combined.

In the 2000 presidential election, Barbara Lett-Simmons, an elector from the district, left her ballot blank to protest its lack of voting representation in Congress. As a result, Al Gore received only two of the three electoral votes from Washington, D.C. In 2016, 85.7% of the registered voters approved a statehood referendum. In recent times, there have been various statehood movements in the District of Columbia, which advocates making the district a state.

The district is a signatory of the National Popular Vote Interstate Compact, an interstate compact in which signatories award all of their electoral votes to the winner of the national-level popular vote in a presidential election, even if another candidate won an individual signatory's popular vote. As of 2025, it has not yet gone into force.

== Presidential elections ==
Key for parties
Democratic Party – (D)
Green Party – (G)
Independent candidate – (I)
Libertarian Party – (LI)
New Alliance Party – (NA)
Republican Party – (R)
Socialist Workers Party – (SW)
Note – A double dagger (‡) indicates the national winner.

Presidential elections in the District of Columbia from 1964 to present
Year	Winner			Runner-up			Other candidate (Note: For purposes of these lists, the "other candidate" is defined as the person who received the third-most votes in the District of Columbia. The total votes across the winner, runner-up, and "other candidate" do not equal the total votes cast in each election because any votes for remaining candidates and write-ins are not counted here.)			EV	Ref.
Year	Candidate	Votes	%	Candidate	Votes	%	Candidate	Votes	%	EV	Ref.
1964	Lyndon B. Johnson (D) ‡	169,796	85.5%	Barry Goldwater (R)	28,801	14.5%	—N/a	—N/a	—N/a	3	
1968	Hubert Humphrey (D)	139,566	81.82%	Richard Nixon (R) ‡	31,012	18.18%	—N/a	—N/a	—N/a	3	
1972	George McGovern (D)	127,627	78.1%	Richard Nixon (R) ‡	35,226	21.56%	Linda Jenness (SW)	316	0.19%	3	
1976	Jimmy Carter (D) ‡	137,818	81.63%	Gerald Ford (R)	27,873	16.51%	Peter Camejo (SW)	545	0.32%	3	
1980	Jimmy Carter (D)	130,231	74.32%	Ronald Reagan (R) ‡	23,313	13.3%	John B. Anderson (I)	16,131	9.21%	3	
1984	Walter Mondale (D)	180,408	85.38%	Ronald Reagan (R) ‡	29,009	13.73%	David Bergland (LI)	279	0.13%	3	
1988	Michael Dukakis (D)	159,407	82.65%	George H. W. Bush (R) ‡	27,590	14.3%	Lenora Fulani (NA)	2,901	1.5%	3	
1992	Bill Clinton (D) ‡	192,619	84.64%	George H. W. Bush (R)	20,698	9.1%	Ross Perot (I)	9,681	4.25%	3	
1996	Bill Clinton (D) ‡	158,220	85.19%	Bob Dole (R)	17,339	9.34%	Ralph Nader (G)	4,780	2.57%	3	
2000	Al Gore (D)	171,923	85.16%	George W. Bush (R) ‡	18,073	8.95%	Ralph Nader (G)	10,576	5.24%	2 (Note: Abstention from one elector)	
2004	John Kerry (D)	202,970	89.18%	George W. Bush (R)‡	21,256	9.34%	Ralph Nader (I)	1,485	0.65%	3	
2008	Barack Obama (D)‡	245,800	92.46%	John McCain (R)	17,367	6.53%	Ralph Nader (I)	1,138	0.43%	3	
2012	Barack Obama (D)‡	267,070	90.91%	Mitt Romney (R)	21,381	7.28%	Jill Stein (G)	2,458	0.84%	3	
2016	Hillary Clinton (D)	282,830	90.86%	Donald Trump (R)‡	12,723	4.09%	Gary Johnson (LI)	4,906	1.58%	3	
2020	Joe Biden (D)‡	317,323	92.15%	Donald Trump (R)	18,586	5.4%	Jo Jorgensen (LI)	2,036	0.59%	3	
2024	Kamala Harris (D)	294,185	90.28%	Donald Trump (R)‡	21,076	6.47%	Robert F. Kennedy Jr. (I)	2,778	0.85%	3	

=== Graph ===
The following graph shows the margin of victory of the Democratic Party over the Republican Party in the 15 presidential elections the District of Columbia participated.

View source data.

== See also ==
- Elections in the District of Columbia
  - United States House of Representatives elections in the District of Columbia
  - United States Senate elections in the District of Columbia
- List of United States presidential election results by state

== Works cited ==
- Guide to U.S. Elections. SAGE Publications. 2010. ISBN 978-1-60426-536-1.
- Presidential elections, 1789–1996. Congressional Quarterly. 1997. ISBN 978-1-56802-065-5. LCCN 97019084. OL 673017M.
