= 1972 United States presidential election in Washington =

1972 United States presidential election in Washington may refer to:

- 1972 United States presidential election in Washington (state)
- 1972 United States presidential election in Washington, D.C.
