= 1980 United States presidential election in Washington =

1980 United States presidential election in Washington may refer to:

- 1980 United States presidential election in Washington (state)
- 1980 United States presidential election in Washington, D.C.
