= 1996 United States presidential election in Massachusetts =

- November 5, 1996
- Turnout: 75.11% (▼9.11%)

Nominee	Bill Clinton	Bob Dole	Ross Perot
Party	Democratic	Republican	Reform
Home state	Arkansas	Kansas	Texas
Running mate	Al Gore	Jack Kemp	Pat Choate
Electoral vote	12	0	0
Popular vote	1,571,763	718,107	227,217
Percentage	61.47%	28.09%	8.89%

Clinton
40–50%
50–60%
60–70%
70–80%
80–90%
Dole
40–50%
50–60%
President before election
Bill Clinton
Democratic
Elected President
Bill Clinton
Democratic

The 1996 United States presidential election in Massachusetts took place on November 5, 1996, as part of the 1996 United States presidential election. Voters chose 12 representatives, or electors to the Electoral College, who voted for president and vice president.

A solidly blue state, Massachusetts was won by incumbent Democratic President Bill Clinton in a landslide. Clinton took 61.47% of the popular vote over Republican challenger Bob Dole, who took 28.09%, a victory margin of 33.39%. Reform Party candidate Ross Perot finished in third, with 8.89% of the popular vote.

Like New England as a whole, Massachusetts is a largely secular and liberal society in the modern era, and thus it rejected an increasingly conservative Republican Party dominated by Evangelical Christians.

Massachusetts had been a Democratic-leaning state since 1928, when voted for Democrat Catholic candidate Al Smith, and a Democratic stronghold since 1960. In fact, Clinton's landslide victory was indicative of a long-term trend in Massachusetts back toward being the overwhelmingly Democratic stronghold it had been in the 1960s, after having trended somewhat toward the GOP in 1976 and the 1980s. Clinton's 61.47% was the highest percentage a presidential candidate had received in Massachusetts since 1968, and his 33.39% victory margin was the widest margin by which any candidate won the state since the massive Democratic landslide of 1964, a record that would not be broken again until 2020.

Massachusetts was the only state in the union where Clinton broke 60% of the vote in 1996, with only the District of Columbia voting more Democratic. Massachusetts registered as a significant 25% more Democratic than the national average, making it the most Democratic state in the 1996 election.

To date, this is the last occasion until 2020 that the town of Walpole voted for the national winning candidate, the last occasion the town of Sherborn voted Republican and the last occasion that the towns of Blandford, East Bridgewater, East Brookfield, Hampden, Hubbardston, Montgomery, Oakham, Southwick, Tolland, and West Bridgewater voted Democratic in a presidential election. The town of Lynnfield would not vote Democratic again until 2020.

== Results ==
1996 United States presidential election in Massachusetts
Party	Candidate	Votes	Percentage	Electoral votes
Democratic	Bill Clinton (incumbent)	1,571,763	61.47%	12
Republican	Bob Dole	718,107	28.09%	0
Reform	Ross Perot	227,217	8.89%	0
Libertarian	Harry Browne	20,426	0.80%	0
Independent (Write-In)	Others	6,012	0.24%	0
Natural Law	John Hagelin	5,184	0.20%	0
Green (Write-in)	Ralph Nader	4,734	0.19%	0
Workers World	Monica Moorehead	3,277	0.13%	0
Socialist (Write-In)	Mary Cal Hollis	61	<0.01%	0
Prohibition (Write-In)	Earl Dodge	4	<0.01%	0
Totals		2,556,785	100.0%	12

=== Results by county ===
County	Bill Clinton Democratic		Bob Dole Republican		Various candidates Other parties		Margin		Total votes cast
County	#	%	#	%	#	%	#	%	Total votes cast
Barnstable	59,223	53.48%	40,144	36.25%	11,370	10.27%	19,079	17.23%	110,737
Berkshire	39,338	64.73%	13,055	21.48%	8,381	13.79%	26,283	43.25%	60,774
Bristol	127,725	64.44%	47,164	23.79%	23,324	11.77%	80,561	40.65%	198,213
Dukes	5,137	66.70%	1,739	22.58%	826	10.72%	3,398	44.12%	7,702
Essex	171,021	58.68%	89,120	30.58%	31,301	10.74%	81,901	28.10%	291,442
Franklin	19,728	60.25%	8,055	24.60%	4,959	15.15%	11,673	35.65%	32,742
Hampden	105,050	60.99%	48,513	28.17%	18,676	10.84%	56,537	32.82%	172,239
Hampshire	41,844	64.07%	14,787	22.64%	8,678	13.29%	27,057	41.43%	65,309
Middlesex	398,190	63.41%	169,926	27.06%	59,861	9.53%	228,264	36.35%	627,977
Nantucket	2,453	58.98%	1,222	29.38%	484	11.64%	1,231	29.60%	4,159
Norfolk	180,504	60.07%	92,982	30.95%	26,985	8.98%	87,522	29.12%	300,471
Plymouth	106,072	54.67%	64,626	33.31%	23,313	12.02%	41,446	21.36%	194,011
Suffolk	145,586	73.01%	39,753	19.94%	14,053	7.05%	105,833	53.07%	199,392
Worcester	169,892	58.26%	87,021	29.84%	34,704	11.90%	82,871	28.42%	291,617
Totals	1,571,763	61.47%	718,107	28.09%	266,915	10.44%	853,656	33.38%	2,556,785

== See also ==
- United States presidential elections in Massachusetts
