= 1972 United States presidential election in Mississippi =

- November 7, 1972

Nominee	Richard Nixon	George McGovern
Party	Republican	Democratic
Home state	California	South Dakota
Running mate	Spiro Agnew	Sargent Shriver
Electoral vote	7	0
Popular vote	505,125	126,782
Percentage	78.20%	19.63%

Nixon
50–60%
60–70%
70–80%
80–90%
90–100%
McGovern
50–60%
President before election
Richard Nixon
Republican
Elected President
Richard Nixon
Republican

The 1972 United States presidential election in Mississippi was held on November 7, 1972. Incumbent President Nixon won the state of Mississippi with 78.20% of the vote. This was the highest percentage Nixon received in any state in the election. Nixon even received a higher share of the vote in Mississippi than McGovern did in the District of Columbia, making this one of only two elections since D.C. sent electors, where Washington, D.C. wasn't the largest margin for either candidate, along with 1964.

In Mississippi, voters voted for electors individually instead of as a slate, as in the other states. McGovern carried only three counties – Claiborne, Holmes, and Jefferson – all of which have overwhelming majority black populations. This was also the first time since 1944 that Mississippi backed the national winner in a presidential election.

As of the 2024 presidential election, this is the last election in which the following counties voted for a Republican presidential candidate: Quitman, Bolivar, Sharkey, Wilkinson, Humphreys, Coahoma, Noxubee, and Tunica. Marshall County wouldn't vote Republican again until 2024. The proportion of white voters supporting McGovern was utterly negligible and estimated at maximally three percent. Calculated estimates indicate that 100% of white voters supported Nixon while 0% supported McGovern.

== Results ==
1972 United States presidential election in Mississippi
Party	Candidate	Votes	Percentage	Electoral votes
Republican	Richard Nixon (incumbent)	505,125	78.20%	7
Democrat	George McGovern	126,782	19.63%	0
Independent	John Schmitz	11,598	1.80%	0
Independent	Linda Jenness	2,458	0.38%	0
Totals		645,963	100.0%	7

=== Results by individual elector ===
General election results
Party	Pledged to	Elector	Votes
Republican Party	Richard Nixon	B. B. McClendon, Jr.	505,125
Republican Party	Richard Nixon	H. F. McCarty, Jr.	500,702
Republican Party	Richard Nixon	Clyde Q. Sheely	500,493
Republican Party	Richard Nixon	Paul V. Lacoste	500,378
Republican Party	Richard Nixon	J. B. Bright	499,990
Republican Party	Richard Nixon	William Neville, Jr.	499,194
Republican Party	Richard Nixon	Joe A. Moore	497,430
Democratic Party	George McGovern	Frank A. Riley	126,782
Democratic Party	George McGovern	Robert S. Reeves	126,116
Democratic Party	George McGovern	Bobby Garraway	124,922
Democratic Party	George McGovern	Mathew Page	124,871
Democratic Party	George McGovern	Daniel Harvey	124,037
Democratic Party	George McGovern	Obie Clark	123,664
Democratic Party	George McGovern	William Bruce Guy	123,080
Independent	John G. Schmitz	William Hollis Burrow	11,598
Independent	John G. Schmitz	Homer Brown Wells	11,030
Independent	John G. Schmitz	Robert L. Baker	10,993
Independent	John G. Schmitz	Robert W. Schaffer	10,925
Independent	John G. Schmitz	Mrs. Robert W. Saul	10,888
Independent	John G. Schmitz	Curtis W. Caine	10,789
Independent	John G. Schmitz	Andrew Cvitanovich	10,569
Independent	Linda Jenness	John Earl Brown	2,458
Independent	Linda Jenness	Robert Donnell	1,478
Independent	Linda Jenness	Shirley M. Roberts	1,415
Independent	Linda Jenness	Delores Buford	1,386
Independent	Linda Jenness	James Westley Miggins	1,359
Independent	Linda Jenness	Darius Singleton	1,313
Total votes			645,963

=== Results by county ===
County	Richard Nixon Republican		George McGovern Democratic		John G. Schmitz Independent		Linda Jenness Independent		Margin		Total votes cast
County	#	%	#	%	#	%	#	%	#	%	Total votes cast
Adams	8,500	67.16%	3,697	29.21%	255	2.01%	205	1.62%	4,803	37.95%	12,657
Alcorn	5,732	83.28%	982	14.27%	134	1.95%	35	0.51%	4,750	69.01%	6,883
Amite	2,846	68.94%	1,185	28.71%	93	2.25%	4	0.10%	1,661	40.23%	4,128
Attala	4,738	79.50%	1,103	18.51%	116	1.95%	3	0.05%	3,635	60.99%	5,960
Benton	1,483	66.35%	701	31.36%	51	2.28%	0	0.00%	782	34.99%	2,235
Bolivar	7,397	66.12%	3,616	32.32%	155	1.39%	19	0.17%	3,781	33.80%	11,187
Calhoun	3,023	90.37%	245	7.32%	75	2.24%	2	0.06%	2,778	83.05%	3,345
Carroll	1,777	73.31%	580	23.93%	66	2.72%	1	0.04%	1,197	49.38%	2,424
Chickasaw	3,753	84.66%	579	13.06%	62	1.40%	39	0.88%	3,174	71.60%	4,433
Choctaw	2,301	86.57%	326	12.26%	29	1.09%	2	0.08%	1,975	74.31%	2,658
Claiborne	1,521	41.76%	2,076	57.00%	31	0.85%	14	0.38%	-555	-15.24%	3,642
Clarke	4,561	81.56%	954	17.06%	74	1.32%	3	0.05%	3,607	64.50%	5,592
Clay	4,035	71.39%	1,410	24.95%	116	2.05%	91	1.61%	2,625	46.44%	5,652
Coahoma	6,602	61.56%	3,708	34.57%	333	3.10%	82	0.76%	2,894	26.99%	10,725
Copiah	5,498	73.11%	1,803	23.98%	125	1.66%	94	1.25%	3,695	49.13%	7,520
Covington	3,842	84.09%	642	14.05%	77	1.69%	8	0.18%	3,200	70.04%	4,569
DeSoto	7,917	80.88%	1,557	15.91%	314	3.21%	1	0.01%	6,360	64.97%	9,789
Forrest	14,418	80.56%	2,933	16.39%	531	2.96%	16	0.09%	11,485	64.17%	17,898
Franklin	2,361	78.73%	561	18.71%	63	2.10%	14	0.47%	1,800	60.02%	2,999
George	3,979	92.90%	270	6.30%	33	0.77%	1	0.02%	3,709	86.60%	4,283
Greene	2,884	83.52%	513	14.86%	43	1.25%	13	0.38%	2,371	68.66%	3,453
Grenada	4,800	75.09%	1,471	23.01%	107	1.67%	14	0.22%	3,329	52.08%	6,392
Hancock	5,133	86.28%	745	12.52%	64	1.08%	7	0.12%	4,388	73.76%	5,949
Harrison	28,962	84.02%	4,761	13.81%	534	1.55%	213	0.62%	24,201	70.21%	34,470
Hinds	49,877	77.82%	12,679	19.78%	1,126	1.76%	414	0.65%	37,198	58.04%	64,096
Holmes	3,158	47.23%	3,459	51.73%	57	0.85%	12	0.18%	-301	-4.50%	6,686
Humphreys	2,334	69.01%	892	26.37%	86	2.54%	70	2.07%	1,442	42.64%	3,382
Issaquena	701	60.80%	395	34.26%	34	2.95%	23	1.99%	306	26.54%	1,153
Itawamba	4,419	89.20%	509	10.27%	24	0.48%	2	0.04%	3,910	78.93%	4,954
Jackson	22,204	88.68%	2,534	10.12%	282	1.13%	18	0.07%	19,670	78.56%	25,038
Jasper	3,597	78.47%	935	20.40%	50	1.09%	2	0.04%	2,662	58.07%	4,584
Jefferson	1,131	43.37%	1,457	55.87%	16	0.61%	4	0.15%	-326	-12.50%	2,608
Jefferson Davis	2,830	72.83%	1,005	25.86%	43	1.11%	8	0.21%	1,825	46.97%	3,886
Jones	16,489	83.79%	2,790	14.18%	320	1.63%	80	0.41%	13,699	69.61%	19,679
Kemper	2,748	75.25%	837	22.92%	65	1.78%	2	0.05%	1,911	52.33%	3,652
Lafayette	5,391	76.89%	1,545	22.04%	67	0.96%	8	0.11%	3,846	54.85%	7,011
Lamar	5,022	88.38%	493	8.68%	161	2.83%	6	0.11%	4,529	79.70%	5,682
Lauderdale	18,337	81.79%	3,453	15.40%	613	2.73%	17	0.08%	14,884	66.39%	22,420
Lawrence	3,394	81.70%	709	17.07%	50	1.20%	1	0.02%	2,685	64.63%	4,154
Leake	4,217	79.13%	1,053	19.76%	56	1.05%	3	0.06%	3,164	59.37%	5,329
Lee	10,730	82.60%	1,632	12.56%	520	4.00%	109	0.84%	9,098	70.04%	12,991
Leflore	6,779	75.58%	2,038	22.72%	148	1.65%	4	0.04%	4,741	52.86%	8,969
Lincoln	7,593	86.01%	1,070	12.12%	161	1.82%	4	0.05%	6,523	73.89%	8,828
Lowndes	10,098	78.70%	2,398	18.69%	326	2.54%	9	0.07%	7,700	60.01%	12,831
Madison	5,047	57.20%	3,464	39.26%	239	2.71%	74	0.84%	1,583	17.94%	8,824
Marion	6,805	79.40%	1,693	19.75%	65	0.76%	7	0.08%	5,112	59.65%	8,570
Marshall	3,326	62.10%	1,875	35.01%	115	2.15%	40	0.75%	1,451	27.09%	5,356
Monroe	7,273	84.10%	1,279	14.79%	84	0.97%	12	0.14%	5,994	69.31%	8,648
Montgomery	3,210	76.32%	925	21.99%	67	1.59%	4	0.10%	2,285	54.33%	4,206
Neshoba	6,815	88.22%	812	10.51%	93	1.20%	5	0.06%	6,003	77.71%	7,725
Newton	5,585	88.05%	597	9.41%	157	2.48%	4	0.06%	4,988	78.64%	6,343
Noxubee	2,239	66.28%	1,052	31.14%	83	2.46%	4	0.12%	1,187	35.14%	3,378
Oktibbeha	6,160	75.56%	1,880	23.06%	100	1.23%	13	0.16%	4,280	52.50%	8,153
Panola	5,284	70.61%	2,091	27.94%	105	1.40%	3	0.04%	3,193	42.67%	7,483
Pearl River	7,487	88.04%	901	10.60%	111	1.31%	5	0.06%	6,586	77.44%	8,504
Perry	2,689	84.14%	446	13.95%	60	1.88%	1	0.03%	2,243	70.19%	3,196
Pike	6,542	72.08%	2,332	25.69%	188	2.07%	14	0.15%	4,210	46.39%	9,076
Pontotoc	4,476	89.45%	488	9.75%	40	0.80%	0	0.00%	3,988	79.70%	5,004
Prentiss	4,607	91.12%	398	7.87%	51	1.01%	0	0.00%	4,209	83.25%	5,056
Quitman	2,524	74.41%	790	23.29%	59	1.74%	19	0.56%	1,734	51.12%	3,392
Rankin	12,187	85.19%	1,913	13.37%	197	1.38%	8	0.06%	10,274	71.82%	14,305
Scott	5,244	79.95%	1,213	18.49%	91	1.39%	11	0.17%	4,031	61.46%	6,559
Sharkey	1,426	67.94%	655	31.21%	15	0.71%	3	0.14%	771	36.73%	2,099
Simpson	5,669	85.87%	871	13.19%	51	0.77%	11	0.17%	4,798	72.68%	6,602
Smith	4,419	92.35%	329	6.88%	36	0.75%	1	0.02%	4,090	85.47%	4,785
Stone	2,467	88.49%	293	10.51%	27	0.97%	1	0.04%	2,174	77.98%	2,788
Sunflower	5,389	73.27%	1,874	25.48%	77	1.05%	15	0.20%	3,515	47.79%	7,355
Tallahatchie	3,442	77.37%	835	18.77%	157	3.53%	15	0.34%	2,607	58.60%	4,449
Tate	3,966	75.74%	1,151	21.98%	104	1.85%	15	0.27%	2,815	53.76%	5,236
Tippah	3,937	85.87%	569	12.41%	76	1.66%	3	0.07%	3,368	73.46%	4,585
Tishomingo	4,177	89.23%	443	9.46%	52	1.11%	9	0.19%	3,734	79.77%	4,681
Tunica	1,446	62.19%	858	36.90%	18	0.77%	3	0.13%	588	25.29%	2,325
Union	5,477	87.91%	658	10.56%	90	1.44%	5	0.08%	4,819	77.35%	6,230
Walthall	3,110	79.66%	747	19.13%	41	1.05%	6	0.15%	2,363	60.53%	3,904
Warren	10,420	71.97%	3,480	24.04%	452	3.12%	126	0.87%	6,940	47.93%	14,478
Washington	9,634	63.78%	4,623	30.61%	535	3.54%	312	2.07%	5,011	33.17%	15,104
Wayne	4,648	82.08%	975	17.22%	35	0.62%	5	0.09%	3,673	64.86%	5,663
Webster	3,624	89.15%	403	9.91%	38	0.93%	0	0.00%	3,221	79.24%	4,065
Wilkinson	1,608	52.65%	1,409	46.14%	32	1.05%	5	0.16%	199	6.51%	3,054
Winston	5,155	78.64%	1,354	20.66%	39	0.59%	7	0.11%	3,801	57.98%	6,555
Yalobusha	2,944	77.53%	797	20.99%	48	1.26%	8	0.21%	2,147	56.54%	3,797
Yazoo	5,555	72.58%	2,008	26.23%	84	1.10%	7	0.09%	3,547	46.35%	7,654
Totals	505,125	78.20%	126,782	19.63%	11,598	1.80%	2,458	0.38%	378,343	58.57%	645,963

=== By congressional district ===
Nixon won all 5 congressional districts.

District	Nixon	McGovern
1st	80.1%	19.9%
2nd	77.4%	22.6%
3rd	79.3%	20.7%
4th	75.7%	24.3%
5th	86.8%	13.2%

== Works cited ==
- Black, Earl; Black, Merle (1992). The Vital South: How Presidents Are Elected. Harvard University Press. ISBN 0674941306.
- Moreland, Laurence; Steed, Robert; Baker, Tod, eds. (1991). The 1988 Presidential Election in the South: Continuity Amidst Change in Southern Party Politics. Praeger Publishers. ISBN 0275931455.
