= 1976 United States presidential election in Washington =

1976 United States presidential election in Washington may refer to:

- 1976 United States presidential election in Washington (state)
- 1976 United States presidential election in Washington, D.C.
