= United States presidential elections in Washington =

United States presidential elections in Washington may refer to:

- United States presidential elections in Washington (state)
- United States presidential elections in Washington, D.C.
