= 1968 United States presidential election in Washington =

1968 United States presidential election in Washington may refer to:

- 1968 United States presidential election in Washington (state)
- 1968 United States presidential election in Washington, D.C.
