= 2020 United States presidential election predictions =

Most election predictors for the 2020 United States presidential election used:

- Tossup: No advantage
- Tilt: Advantage that is not quite as strong as "lean"
- Lean: Slight advantage
- Likely: Significant, but surmountable, advantage (highest rating given by CBS News and NPR)
- Safe or solid: Near-certain chance of victory

| State or district | EV | PVI | 2016 result | 2020 result | Cook Oct 28, 2020 | Inside Elections Oct 28, 2020 | Sabato Nov 2, 2020 | Politico Nov 2, 2020 | Real Clear Politics Oct 29, 2020 | Niskanen Center Sep 15, 2020 | CNN Nov 2, 2020 | The Economist Nov 3, 2020 | CBS News Nov 1, 2020 | 270 to Win Nov 3, 2020 | ABC News Nov 2, 2020 | NPR Oct 30, 2020 | NBC News Oct 27, 2020 | DDHQ Nov 3, 2020 | Five Thirty Eight (Note: Projected chances of winning indicated by Tossup: 50%–59%, Lean: 60%–74%, Likely: 75%–94%, Solid: 95%–100%) Nov 2, 2020 |
|---|---|---|---|---|---|---|---|---|---|---|---|---|---|---|---|---|---|---|---|
| Alabama | 9 | R+14 | +27.73% R | +25.46% R | Solid R | Solid R | Safe R | Solid R | Solid R | Safe R | Solid R | Safe R | Likely R | Safe R | Solid R | Likely R | Solid R | Safe R | Solid R |
| Alaska | 3 | R+9 | +14.73% R | +10.06% R | Likely R | Lean R | Likely R | Lean R | Likely R | Tossup | Solid R | Likely R | Likely R | Likely R | Lean R | Lean R | Likely R | Likely R | Likely R |
| Arizona | 11 | R+5 | +3.50% R | +0.31% D (flip) | Lean D (flip) | Tilt D (flip) | Lean D (flip) | Tossup | Tossup | Likely D (flip) | Tossup | Lean D (flip) | Tossup | Tossup | Lean D (flip) | Tossup | Tossup | Tossup | Lean D (flip) |
| Arkansas | 6 | R+15 | +26.92% R | +27.62% R | Solid R | Solid R | Safe R | Solid R | Likely R | Safe R | Solid R | Safe R | Likely R | Safe R | Solid R | Likely R | Solid R | Safe R | Solid R |
| California | 55 | D+12 | +30.11% D | +29.16% D | Solid D | Solid D | Safe D | Solid D | Solid D | Safe D | Solid D | Safe D | Likely D | Safe D | Solid D | Likely D | Solid D | Safe D | Solid D |
| Colorado | 9 | D+1 | +4.91% D | +13.50% D | Likely D | Solid D | Likely D | Likely D | Lean D | Safe D | Lean D | Safe D | Likely D | Likely D | Solid D | Likely D | Likely D | Safe D | Solid D |
| Connecticut | 7 | D+6 | +13.64% D | +20.07% D | Solid D | Solid D | Safe D | Solid D | Likely D | Safe D | Solid D | Safe D | Likely D | Safe D | Solid D | Likely D | Likely D | Safe D | Solid D |
| Delaware | 3 | D+6 | +11.37% D | +18.97% D | Solid D | Solid D | Safe D | Solid D | Solid D | Safe D | Solid D | Safe D | Likely D | Safe D | Solid D | Likely D | Solid D | Safe D | Solid D |
| District of Columbia | 3 | D+41 | +86.78% D | +86.75% D | Solid D | Solid D | Safe D | Solid D | Solid D | Safe D | Solid D | Safe D | Likely D | Safe D | Solid D | Likely D | Solid D | Safe D | Solid D |
| Florida | 29 | R+2 | +1.20% R (flip) | +3.36% R | Tossup | Tilt D (flip) | Lean R | Tossup | Tossup | Likely D (flip) | Tossup | Lean D (flip) | Tossup | Tossup | Tossup | Tossup | Tossup | Lean D (flip) | Lean D (flip) |
| Georgia | 16 | R+5 | +5.13% R | +0.24% D (flip) | Tossup | Tilt D (flip) | Lean D (flip) | Tossup | Tossup | Tossup | Tossup | Tossup | Tossup | Tossup | Lean D (flip) | Tossup | Tossup | Tossup | Tossup |
| Hawaii | 4 | D+18 | +32.18% D | +29.46% D | Solid D | Solid D | Safe D | Solid D | Solid D | Safe D | Solid D | Safe D | Likely D | Safe D | Solid D | Likely D | Solid D | Safe D | Solid D |
| Idaho | 4 | R+19 | +31.77% R | +30.77% R | Solid R | Solid R | Safe R | Solid R | Solid R | Safe R | Solid R | Safe R | Likely R | Safe R | Solid R | Likely R | Solid R | Safe R | Solid R |
| Illinois | 20 | D+7 | +17.06% D | +16.99% D | Solid D | Solid D | Safe D | Solid D | Likely D | Safe D | Solid D | Safe D | Likely D | Safe D | Solid D | Likely D | Likely D | Safe D | Solid D |
| Indiana | 11 | R+9 | +19.17% R | +16.06% R | Likely R | Solid R | Likely R | Likely R | Lean R | Safe R | Solid R | Safe R | Likely R | Likely R | Solid R | Likely R | Likely R | Safe R | Solid R |
| Iowa | 6 | R+3 | +9.41% R (flip) | +8.20% R | Tossup | Tossup | Lean R | Tossup | Tossup | Tossup | Tossup | Tossup | Tossup | Tossup | Tossup | Tossup | Tossup | Tossup | Lean R |
| Kansas | 6 | R+13 | +20.60% R | +14.65% R | Likely R | Lean R | Likely R | Likely R | Likely R | Safe R | Solid R | Safe R | Likely R | Likely R | Solid R | Likely R | Likely R | Safe R | Solid R |
| Kentucky | 8 | R+15 | +29.84% R | +25.94% R | Solid R | Solid R | Safe R | Solid R | Solid R | Safe R | Solid R | Safe R | Likely R | Safe R | Solid R | Likely R | Solid R | Safe R | Solid R |
| Louisiana | 8 | R+11 | +19.64% R | +18.61% R | Solid R | Solid R | Safe R | Solid R | Likely R | Safe R | Solid R | Safe R | Likely R | Safe R | Solid R | Likely R | Likely R | Safe R | Solid R |
| Maine | 2 | D+3 | +2.96% D | +9.07% D | Likely D | Solid D | Likely D | Likely D | Lean D | Safe D | Solid D | Safe D | Likely D | Likely D | Solid D | Likely D | Likely D | Safe D | Likely D |
| ME-1 | 1 | D+8 | +14.81% D | +23.09% D | Solid D | Solid D | Safe D | Solid D | Likely D | Safe D | Solid D | — | Likely D | Safe D | Solid D | Likely D | Solid D | Safe D | Solid D |
| ME-2 | 1 | R+2 | +10.29% R (flip) | +7.44% R | Tossup | Tossup | Lean R | Tossup | Tossup | Likely R | Tossup | — | Tossup | Tossup | Tossup | Tossup | Tossup | Tossup | Tossup |
| Maryland | 10 | D+12 | +26.42% D | +33.21% D | Solid D | Solid D | Safe D | Solid D | Solid D | Safe D | Solid D | Safe D | Likely D | Safe D | Solid D | Likely D | Solid D | Safe D | Solid D |
| Massachusetts | 11 | D+12 | +27.20% D | +33.46% D | Solid D | Solid D | Safe D | Solid D | Solid D | Safe D | Solid D | Safe D | Likely D | Safe D | Solid D | Likely D | Solid D | Safe D | Solid D |
| Michigan | 16 | D+1 | +0.23% R (flip) | +2.78% D (flip) | Lean D (flip) | Lean D (flip) | Lean D (flip) | Lean D (flip) | Tossup | Likely D (flip) | Lean D (flip) | Likely D (flip) | Lean D (flip) | Lean D (flip) | Lean D (flip) | Lean D (flip) | Lean D (flip) | Likely D (flip) | Solid D (flip) |
| Minnesota | 10 | D+1 | +1.52% D | +7.11% D | Lean D | Likely D | Likely D | Lean D | Tossup | Likely D | Lean D | Likely D | Lean D | Likely D | Lean D | Lean D | Lean D | Likely D | Solid D |
| Mississippi | 6 | R+9 | +17.83% R | +16.55% R | Solid R | Solid R | Safe R | Solid R | Likely R | Safe R | Solid R | Safe R | Likely R | Safe R | Solid R | Likely R | Likely R | Safe R | Likely R |
| Missouri | 10 | R+9 | +18.64% R | +15.39% R | Likely R | Lean R | Likely R | Likely R | Lean R | Safe R | Solid R | Likely R | Likely R | Likely R | Lean R | Lean R | Likely R | Likely R | Likely R |
| Montana | 3 | R+11 | +20.42% R | +16.37% R | Likely R | Lean R | Likely R | Likely R | Lean R | Likely R | Solid R | Likely R | Likely R | Likely R | Lean R | Lean R | Likely R | Likely R | Likely R |
| Nebraska | 2 | R+14 | +25.05% R | +19.06% R | Solid R | Solid R | Safe R | Solid R | Solid R | Safe R | Solid R | Safe R | Likely R | Safe R | Solid R | Likely R | Solid R | Safe R | Solid R |
| NE-1 | 1 | R+11 | +20.72% R | +14.92% R | Solid R | Solid R | Safe R | Solid R | Solid R | Safe R | Solid R | — | Likely R | Safe R | Solid R | Lean R | Solid R | Safe R | Solid R |
| NE-2 | 1 | R+4 | +2.24% R | +6.50% D (flip) | Lean D (flip) | Tilt D (flip) | Lean D (flip) | Lean D (flip) | Tossup | Tossup | Lean D (flip) | — | Lean D (flip) | Lean D (flip) | Lean D (flip) | Lean D (flip) | Lean D (flip) | Lean D (flip) | Lean D (flip) |
| NE-3 | 1 | R+27 | +54.19% R | +53.02% R | Solid R | Solid R | Safe R | Solid R | Solid R | Safe R | Solid R | — | Likely R | Safe R | Solid R | Likely R | Solid R | Safe R | Solid R |
| Nevada | 6 | D+1 | +2.42% D | +2.39% D | Lean D | Likely D | Lean D | Lean D | Tossup | Safe D | Lean D | Likely D | Lean D | Lean D | Lean D | Lean D | Lean D | Likely D | Likely D |
| New Hampshire | 4 | D+1 | +0.37% D | +7.35% D | Lean D | Likely D | Likely D | Lean D | Lean D | Safe D | Lean D | Likely D | Lean D | Lean D | Lean D | Likely D | Lean D | Likely D | Likely D |
| New Jersey | 14 | D+7 | +14.10% D | +15.94% D | Solid D | Solid D | Safe D | Solid D | Likely D | Safe D | Solid D | Safe D | Likely D | Safe D | Solid D | Likely D | Likely D | Safe D | Solid D |
| New Mexico | 5 | D+3 | +8.21% D | +10.79% D | Solid D | Solid D | Likely D | Likely D | Lean D | Safe D | Solid D | Safe D | Likely D | Likely D | Solid D | Likely D | Likely D | Safe D | Solid D |
| New York | 29 | D+11 | +22.49% D | +23.11% D | Solid D | Solid D | Safe D | Solid D | Solid D | Safe D | Solid D | Safe D | Likely D | Safe D | Solid D | Likely D | Solid D | Safe D | Solid D |
| North Carolina | 15 | R+3 | +3.66% R | +1.35% R | Tossup | Tilt D (flip) | Lean D (flip) | Tossup | Tossup | Tossup | Tossup | Lean D (flip) | Tossup | Tossup | Lean D (flip) | Tossup | Tossup | Tossup | Lean D (flip) |
| North Dakota | 3 | R+16 | +35.73% R | +33.34% R | Solid R | Solid R | Safe R | Solid R | Solid R | Safe R | Solid R | Safe R | Likely R | Safe R | Solid R | Likely R | Solid R | Safe R | Solid R |
| Ohio | 18 | R+3 | +8.13% R (flip) | +8.03% R | Tossup | Tossup | Lean R | Tossup | Tossup | Tossup | Tossup | Tossup | Tossup | Tossup | Tossup | Tossup | Tossup | Tossup | Tossup |
| Oklahoma | 7 | R+20 | +36.39% R | +33.09% R | Solid R | Solid R | Safe R | Solid R | Solid R | Safe R | Solid R | Safe R | Likely R | Safe R | Solid R | Likely R | Solid R | Safe R | Solid R |
| Oregon | 7 | D+5 | +10.98% D | +16.09% D | Solid D | Solid D | Safe D | Likely D | Lean D | Safe D | Solid D | Safe D | Likely D | Safe D | Solid D | Likely D | Likely D | Safe D | Solid D |
| Pennsylvania | 20 | EVEN | +0.72% R (flip) | +1.16% D (flip) | Lean D (flip) | Lean D (flip) | Lean D (flip) | Lean D (flip) | Tossup | Likely D (flip) | Lean D (flip) | Likely D (flip) | Lean D (flip) | Lean D (flip) | Lean D (flip) | Lean D (flip) | Lean D (flip) | Lean D (flip) | Likely D (flip) |
| Rhode Island | 4 | D+10 | +15.51% D | +20.77% D | Solid D | Solid D | Safe D | Solid D | Likely D | Safe D | Solid D | Safe D | Likely D | Safe D | Solid D | Likely D | Likely D | Safe D | Solid D |
| South Carolina | 9 | R+8 | +14.27% R | +11.68% R | Likely R | Likely R | Likely R | Solid R | Lean R | Likely R | Solid R | Likely R | Likely R | Likely R | Solid R | Likely R | Likely R | Likely R | Likely R |
| South Dakota | 3 | R+14 | +29.79% R | +26.16% R | Solid R | Solid R | Safe R | Solid R | Solid R | Safe R | Solid R | Safe R | Likely R | Safe R | Solid R | Likely R | Solid R | Safe R | Solid R |
| Tennessee | 11 | R+14 | +26.01% R | +23.21% R | Solid R | Solid R | Safe R | Solid R | Solid R | Safe R | Solid R | Safe R | Likely R | Safe R | Solid R | Likely R | Solid R | Safe R | Solid R |
| Texas | 38 | R+8 | +8.99% R | +5.58% R | Tossup | Tossup | Lean R | Lean R | Tossup | Tossup | Lean R | Lean R | Lean R | Lean R | Tossup | Tossup | Tossup | Lean R | Lean R |
| Utah | 6 | R+20 | +18.08% R | +20.48% R | Likely R | Likely R | Likely R | Likely R | Likely R | Safe R | Solid R | Safe R | Likely R | Likely R | Solid R | Likely R | Likely R | Safe R | Solid R |
| Vermont | 3 | D+15 | +26.41% D | +35.41% D | Solid D | Solid D | Safe D | Solid D | Solid D | Safe D | Solid D | Safe D | Likely D | Safe D | Solid D | Likely D | Solid D | Safe D | Solid D |
| Virginia | 13 | D+1 | +5.32% D | +10.11% D | Likely D | Solid D | Likely D | Likely D | Lean D | Safe D | Solid D | Likely D | Likely D | Likely D | Solid D | Likely D | Likely D | Safe D | Solid D |
| Washington | 12 | D+7 | +15.71% D | +19.20% D | Solid D | Solid D | Safe D | Solid D | Likely D | Safe D | Solid D | Safe D | Likely D | Safe D | Solid D | Likely D | Solid D | Safe D | Solid D |
| West Virginia | 5 | R+19 | +42.07% R | +38.93% R | Solid R | Solid R | Safe R | Solid R | Solid R | Safe R | Solid R | Safe R | Likely R | Safe R | Solid R | Likely R | Solid R | Safe R | Solid R |
| Wisconsin | 10 | EVEN | +0.77% R (flip) | +0.63% D (flip) | Lean D (flip) | Lean D (flip) | Lean D (flip) | Lean D (flip) | Tossup | Likely D (flip) | Lean D (flip) | Likely D (flip) | Lean D (flip) | Lean D (flip) | Lean D (flip) | Lean D (flip) | Lean D (flip) | Likely D (flip) | Likely D (flip) |
| Wyoming | 3 | R+25 | +46.29% R | +43.38% R | Solid R | Solid R | Safe R | Solid R | Solid R | Safe R | Solid R | Safe R | Likely R | Safe R | Solid R | Likely R | Solid R | Safe R | Solid R |
| Overall | 538 | EVEN | D: 232; R: 306 | D: 306; R: 232 | D: 290; R: 125; Tossup: 123 | D: 350; R: 125; Tossup: 63 | D: 321; R: 217; Tossup: 0 | D: 279; R: 163; Tossup: 96 | D: 216; R: 125; Tossup: 197 | D: 318; R: 123; Tossup: 97 | D: 279; R: 163; Tossup: 96 | D: 334; R: 164; Tossup: 40 | D: 279; R: 163; Tossup: 96 | D: 279; R: 163; Tossup: 96 | D: 321; R: 125; Tossup: 92 | D: 279; R: 125; Tossup: 134 | D: 279; R: 125; Tossup: 134 | D: 308; R: 163; Tossup: 67 | D: 334; R: 169; Tossup: 35 |
