= 2012 United States presidential election in Maryland =

- November 6, 2012
- Turnout: 74.00% ▲

Nominee	Barack Obama	Mitt Romney
Party	Democratic	Republican
Home state	Illinois	Massachusetts
Running mate	Joe Biden	Paul Ryan
Electoral vote	10	0
Popular vote	1,677,844	971,869
Percentage	61.97%	35.90%

Obama
40–50%
50–60%
60–70%
70–80%
80–90%
90–100%
Romney
40–50%
50–60%
60–70%
70–80%
80–90%
President before election
Barack Obama
Democratic
Elected President
Barack Obama
Democratic

The 2012 United States presidential election in Maryland took place on November 6, 2012, as part of the 2012 United States presidential election in which all 50 states plus the District of Columbia participated. Maryland voters chose 10 electors to represent them in the Electoral College via a popular vote pitting incumbent Democratic President Barack Obama and his running mate, Vice President Joe Biden, against Republican challenger and former Massachusetts Governor Mitt Romney and his running mate, Congressman Paul Ryan.

Maryland is one of six states where Obama performed better in 2012 than in 2008, with his percentage of the vote increasing from 61.92% to 61.97%. He flipped Somerset County but lost Kent County which he won in 2008. In this election, Maryland voted 22.21% to the left of the nation at-large.

As of the 2024 presidential election, this is the last time a Republican won Anne Arundel County and a Democrat won Somerset County.

== Primary elections ==
=== Republican primary ===
2012 Maryland Republican presidential primary
- April 3, 2012

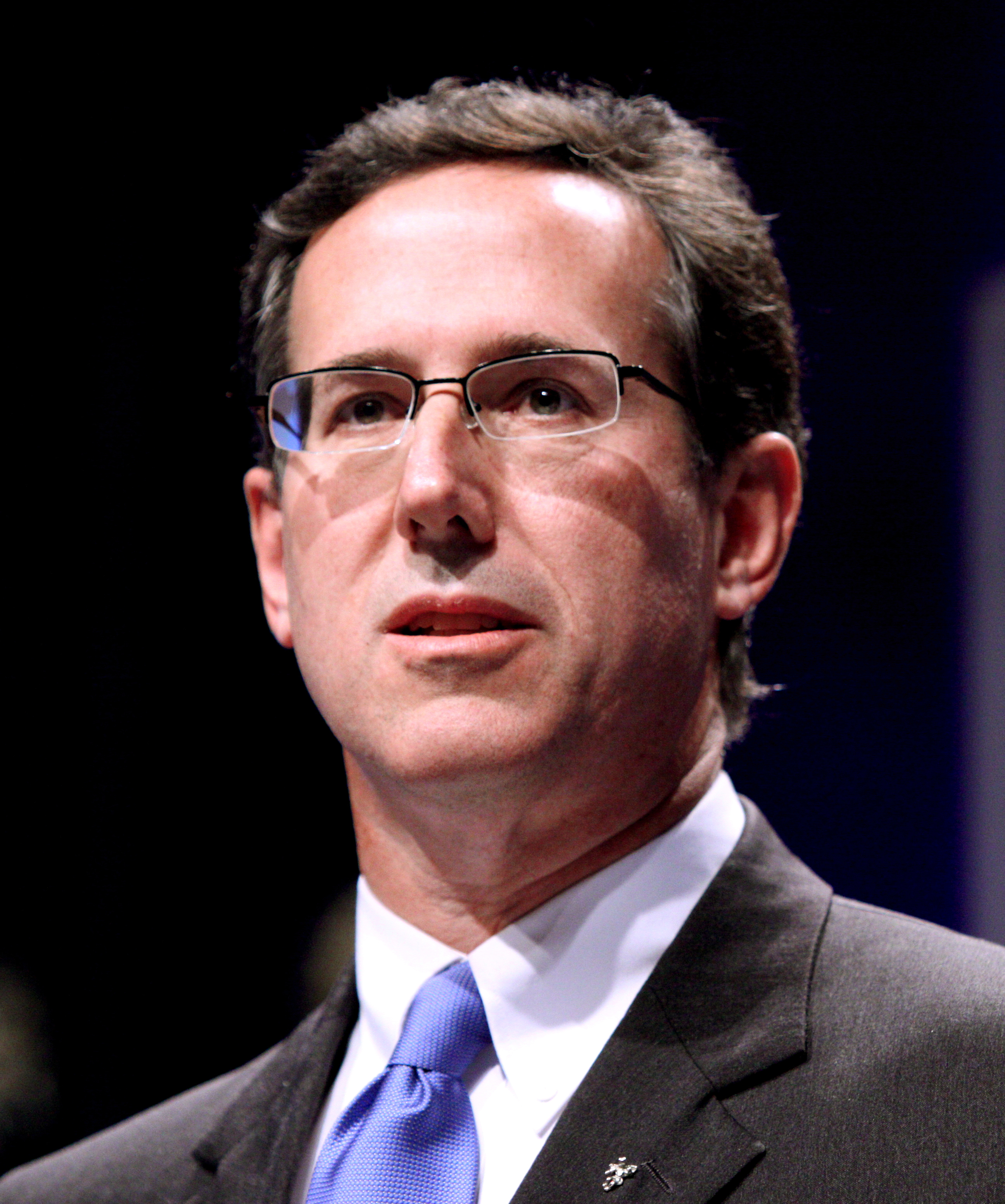

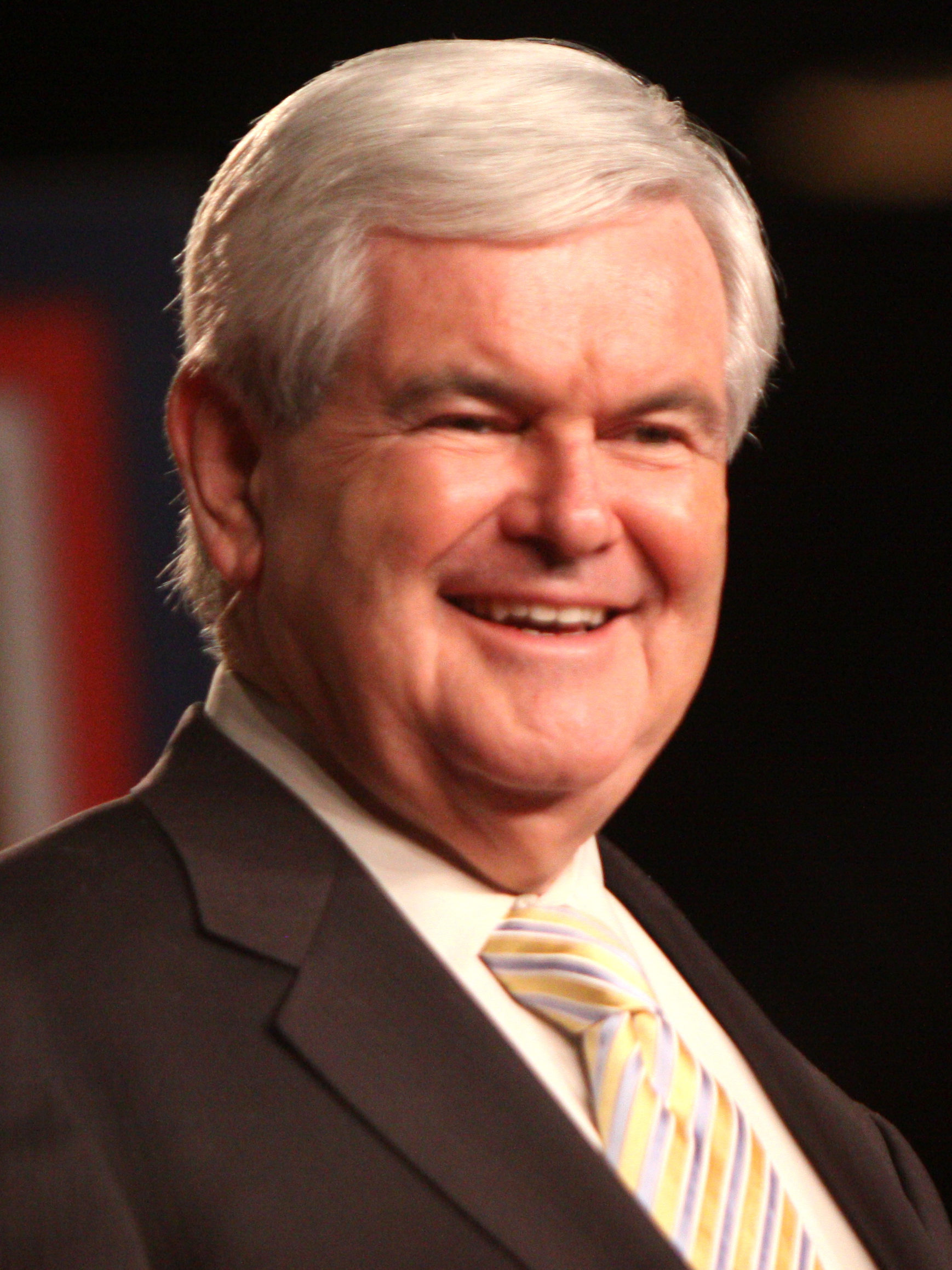

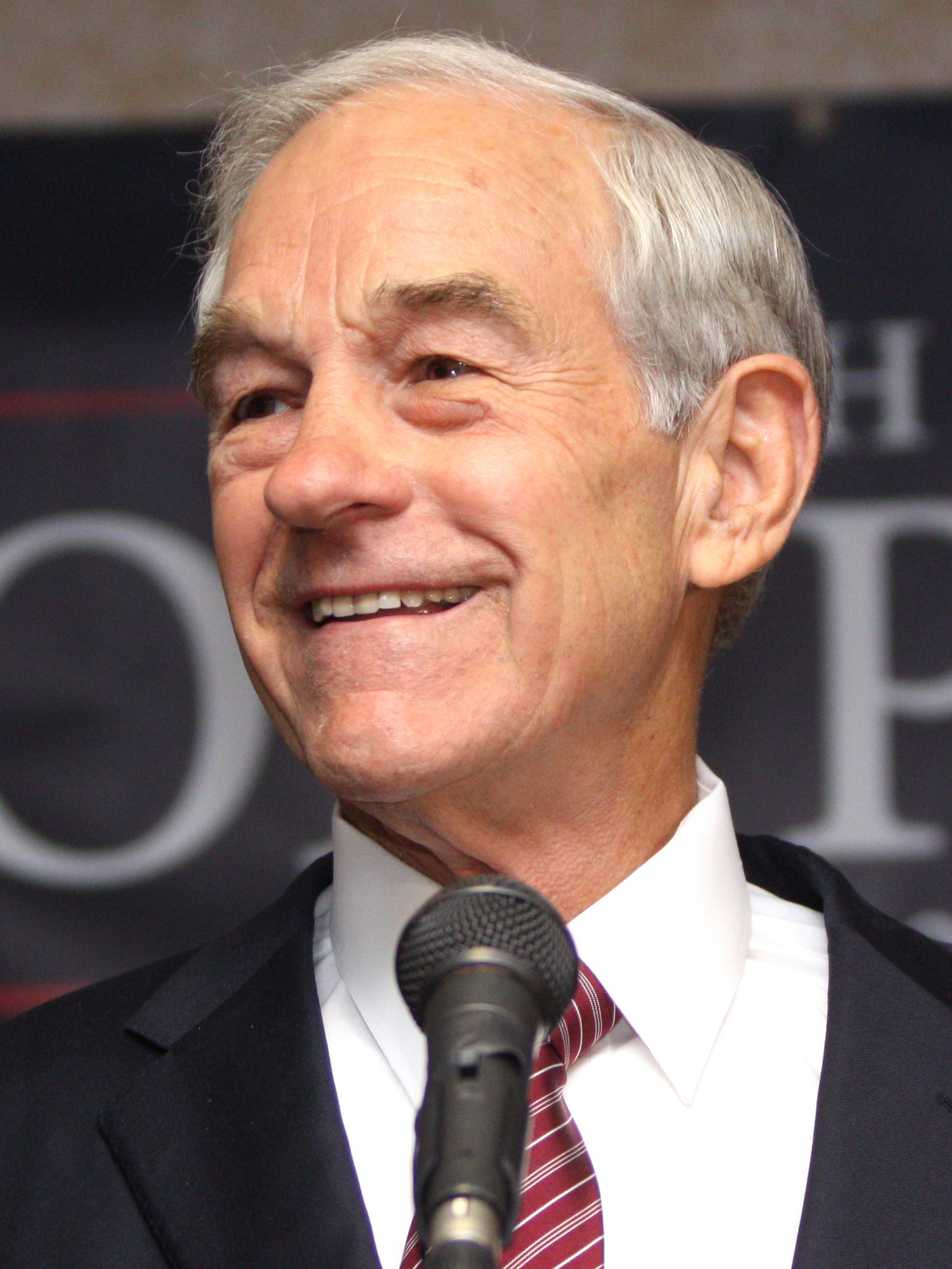
Candidate	Mitt Romney	Rick Santorum
Home state	Massachusetts	Pennsylvania
Delegate count	37	0
Popular vote	117,527	69,020
Percentage	49.2%	28.9%
Candidate	Newt Gingrich	Ron Paul
Home state	Georgia	Texas
Delegate count	0	0
Popular vote	26,088	22,698
Percentage	10.9%	9.5%
- Romney: 30–40% 40–50% 50–60% Santorum: 40–50% 50–60%

The Republican primary took place on April 3, 2012, the same day as the District of Columbia Republican primary and the Wisconsin Republican primary. After the primary, 37 delegates were selected to attend the Republican National Convention.

2012 Maryland Republican presidential primary
Candidate	Votes	Percentage	Delegates
Mitt Romney	117,527	49.2%	37
Rick Santorum	69,020	28.9%	0
Newt Gingrich	26,088	10.9%	0
Ron Paul	22,698	9.5%	0
Jon Huntsman, Jr.	1,406	0.6%	0
Rick Perry	1,041	0.4%	0
Buddy Roemer	858	0.4%	0
Fred Karger	342	0.1%	0
Unprojected delegates:			3
Total:	238,987	100%	37

=== Green primary ===
Green National Convention, Maryland Delegate Vote
Candidate	Delegates	Percentage
Jill Stein	5	83%
Roseanne Barr	1	17%
Others	-	-
Total	6	100%

=== Libertarian primary ===
Libertarian National Convention, Maryland Delegate Vote
Candidate	Delegates	Percentage
Gary Johnson	9	64%
R. Lee Wrights	4	29%
Carl Person	1	7%
Others	-	-
Total	14	100%

== General election ==
=== Predictions ===
Source	Ranking	As of
Huffington Post	Safe D	November 6, 2012
CNN	Safe D	November 6, 2012
New York Times	Safe D	November 6, 2012
Washington Post	Safe D	November 6, 2012
RealClearPolitics	Solid D	November 6, 2012
Sabato's Crystal Ball	Solid D	November 5, 2012
FiveThirtyEight	Solid D	November 6, 2012

=== Results ===
2012 United States presidential election in Maryland
Party	Candidate	Running mate	Votes	Percentage	Electoral votes
Democratic	Barack Obama (incumbent)	Joe Biden (incumbent)	1,677,844	61.97%	10
Republican	Mitt Romney	Paul Ryan	971,869	35.90%	0
Libertarian	Gary Johnson	Jim Gray	30,195	1.12%	0
Green	Jill Stein	Cheri Honkala	17,110	0.63%	0
Others			10,309	0.38%	0
Totals			2,707,327	100.00%	10
Voter turnout (registered voters)					69.4%

==== By county ====
County	Barack Obama Democratic		Mitt Romney Republican		Various candidates Other parties		Margin		Total votes cast
County	#	%	#	%	#	%	#	%	Total votes cast
Allegany	9,805	32.85%	19,230	64.42%	815	2.73%	-9,425	-31.57%	29,850
Anne Arundel	126,635	48.68%	126,832	48.75%	6,688	2.57%	-197	-0.07%	260,155
Baltimore	220,322	57.26%	154,908	40.26%	9,552	2.48%	65,414	17.00%	384,782
Baltimore City	221,478	87.19%	28,171	11.09%	4,356	1.71%	193,307	76.10%	254,005
Calvert	20,529	45.10%	23,952	52.62%	1,037	2.28%	-3,423	-7.52%	45,518
Caroline	4,970	37.21%	8,098	60.63%	289	2.16%	-3,128	-23.42%	13,357
Carroll	27,939	31.92%	56,761	64.84%	2,836	3.24%	-28,822	-32.92%	87,536
Cecil	16,557	38.98%	24,806	58.39%	1,117	2.63%	-8,249	-19.41%	42,480
Charles	48,774	64.84%	25,178	33.47%	1,270	1.69%	23,596	31.37%	75,222
Dorchester	7,257	46.99%	7,976	51.64%	211	1.37%	-719	-4.65%	15,444
Frederick	55,146	47.09%	58,798	50.21%	3,171	2.71%	-3,652	-3.12%	117,115
Garrett	3,124	23.74%	9,743	74.05%	290	2.20%	-6,619	-50.31%	13,157
Harford	49,729	39.48%	72,911	57.89%	3,314	2.63%	-23,182	-18.41%	125,954
Howard	91,393	59.69%	57,758	37.72%	3,957	2.58%	33,635	21.97%	153,108
Kent	4,842	48.89%	4,870	49.17%	192	1.94%	-28	-0.28%	9,904
Montgomery	323,400	70.92%	123,353	27.05%	9,239	2.03%	200,047	43.87%	455,992
Prince George's	347,938	89.73%	35,734	9.22%	4,072	1.05%	312,204	80.51%	387,744
Queen Anne's	8,556	34.38%	15,823	63.58%	509	2.05%	-7,267	-29.20%	24,888
St. Mary's	19,711	41.22%	26,797	56.03%	1,316	2.75%	-7,086	-14.81%	47,824
Somerset	5,240	50.39%	5,042	48.49%	117	1.13%	198	1.90%	10,399
Talbot	8,808	43.05%	11,339	55.42%	312	1.53%	-2,531	-12.37%	20,459
Washington	25,042	39.90%	36,074	57.48%	1,639	2.61%	-11,032	-17.58%	62,755
Wicomico	19,635	46.46%	21,764	51.50%	860	2.04%	-2,129	-5.04%	42,259
Worcester	11,014	40.17%	15,951	58.17%	455	1.66%	-4,937	-18.00%	27,420
Totals	1,677,844	61.97%	971,869	35.90%	57,614	2.13%	705,975	26.07%	2,707,327

County that flipped from Democratic to Republican

- Kent (largest town: Chestertown)

County that flipped from Republican to Democratic

- Somerset (largest town: Princess Anne)

==== By congressional district ====
Obama won seven of the state's eight congressional districts.

District	Obama	Romney	Representative
1st	38%	60%	Andy Harris
2nd	63%	35%	Dutch Ruppersberger
3rd	61%	37%	John Sarbanes
4th	78%	21%	Donna Edwards
5th	66%	32%	Steny Hoyer
6th	55%	43%	John Delaney
7th	76%	22%	Elijah Cummings
8th	62%	36%	Chris Van Hollen

== See also ==
- United States presidential elections in Maryland
- 2012 United States presidential election
- 2012 United States elections
- Maryland Republican Party
- Maryland Green Party
- Maryland Libertarian Party
