= 2024 United States presidential election in the District of Columbia =

- November 5, 2024
- Turnout: 70.8% ▲

Nominee	Kamala Harris	Donald Trump
Party	Democratic	Republican
Home state	California	Florida
Running mate	Tim Walz	JD Vance
Electoral vote	3	0
Popular vote	294,185	21,076
Percentage	90.28%	6.47%

Harris
70–80%
80–90%
90–100%
President before election
Joe Biden
Democratic
Elected President
Donald Trump
Republican

The 2024 United States presidential election in the District of Columbia took place on Tuesday, November 5, 2024, as part of the 2024 United States presidential election in which all 50 states plus the District of Columbia participated. District of Columbia voters chose electors to represent them in the Electoral College via a popular vote. The District of Columbia has 3 electoral votes in the Electoral College, following reapportionment due to the 2020 United States census in which the district neither gained nor lost a seat. Per the Constitution, the District of Columbia can not be apportioned more members of the Electoral College than the number apportioned to the state with the fewest.

As an extremely blue urban district with an African American plurality, Democrats have faced no challenge to earning the District of Columbia's electoral votes in presidential elections since it was first granted its electoral college representation. Starting with Lyndon B. Johnson's victory in 1964, every Democratic nominee for president has won the District by massive margins, including the 49-state landslide defeats of George McGovern and Walter Mondale in 1972 and 1984. Thus, the district was expected to be a certain lock for Kamala Harris in 2024.

Harris won the district overwhelmingly with 90.28% of the vote. The district was both Harris' strongest electoral jurisdiction and county-equivalent jurisdiction, voting more Democratic than all state counties in the United States. Trump won 6.47% of the vote, his best performance in terms of percentage of votes cast in all three of his runs. Trump also won the highest raw total in the district over all three of his runs, though this was still lower than 2012.

Despite overwhelmingly voting Democratic, the district still shifted right by approximately 3 percentage points from 2020, in addition to all 50 states shifting right from 2020 to 2024. Harris won the lowest vote share in the district since 2004, though she still won over 90% of the vote.

== Primary elections ==
=== Republican primary ===
The District of Columbia Republican presidential primary was held on March 1–3, 2024, alongside primaries in Montana, New Jersey, New Mexico, and South Dakota.

The District of Columbia was one of only two jurisdictions not to be won by Trump in the 2024 Republican primaries, the other being Vermont.

District of Columbia Republican primary, March 1–3, 2024
Candidate	Votes	Percentage	Actual delegate count		
Candidate	Votes	Percentage	Bound	Unbound	Total
Nikki Haley	1,274	62.76%	19	0	19
Donald Trump	676	33.30%	0	0	0
Ron DeSantis (withdrawn)	38	1.87%	0	0	0
Chris Christie (withdrawn)	18	0.89%	0	0	0
Vivek Ramaswamy (withdrawn)	15	0.74%	0	0	0
David Stuckenberg	8	0.39%	0	0	0
Ryan Binkley (withdrawn)	1	0.05%	0	0	0
Total:	2,030	100.00%	19	0	19

=== Democratic primary ===
The 2024 District of Columbia primary was held on June 4, 2024, alongside primaries in South Dakota, New Mexico, New Jersey, Montana.

District of Columbia Democratic primary, June 4, 2024
Candidate	Votes	%	Delegates
Joe Biden (incumbent)	80,240	84.50	20
Marianne Williamson	3,958	4.17	0
Armando Perez-Serrato	1,030	1.08	0
Write-in votes	7,113	7.49	—
Over and undervotes (Note: Over votes 108, under votes 2,507)	2,615	2.75	—
Total	94,956	100%	20

=== Statehood Green primary ===
The D.C. Statehood Green Party primary was held on June 4, 2024, alongside primaries in Montana. No candidate appeared on the ballot.

D.C. Statehood Green primary, June 4, 2024
Candidate	Votes	Percentage	Delegates
Scattered write-ins	317	58.81%	0
Under votes	222	41.19%	0
Total:	539	100.00%	5
Source: District of Columbia: Board of Elections

== General election ==
=== Predictions ===
Source	Ranking	As of
Cook Political Report	Solid D	December 19, 2023
Inside Elections	Solid D	April 26, 2023
Sabato's Crystal Ball	Safe D	June 29, 2023
Decision Desk HQ/The Hill	Safe D	December 14, 2023
CNalysis	Solid D	December 30, 2023
CNN	Solid D	January 14, 2024
The Economist	Safe D	June 12, 2024
538	Solid D	June 11, 2024
RCP	Solid D	June 26, 2024
NBC News	Safe D	October 6, 2024

=== Results ===
2024 United States presidential election in the District of Columbia
Party	Candidate	Votes	%	±%
Democratic	Kamala Harris; Tim Walz	294,185	90.28	−1.87
Republican	Donald Trump; JD Vance	21,076	6.47	+1.07
Independent	Robert F. Kennedy Jr. (withdrawn); Nicole Shanahan (withdrawn)	2,778	0.85	N/A
Write-in		7,830	2.40	+1.49
Total votes		325,869	100.00	N/A

=== Results by ward ===
Ward	Kamala Harris Democratic		Donald Trump Republican		Other candidates Various parties		Margin		Total votes cast
Ward	#	%	#	%	#	%	#	%	Total votes cast
Ward 1	36,882	91.15%	2,056	5.08%	1,525	3.77%	34,826	86.07%	40,463
Ward 2	33,571	88.44%	2,982	7.86%	1,406	3.70%	30,589	80.58%	37,959
Ward 3	39,521	88.64%	3,544	7.95%	1,519	3.41%	35,977	80.69%	44,584
Ward 4	38,628	91.10%	2,511	5.92%	1,264	2.98%	36,117	85.18%	42,403
Ward 5	41,413	91.80%	2,309	5.12%	1,392	3.09%	39,104	86.68%	45,114
Ward 6	43,262	88.87%	3,638	7.47%	1,778	3.65%	39,624	81.40%	48,678
Ward 7	33,972	91.72%	2,092	5.65%	973	2.63%	31,880	86.07%	37,037
Ward 8	26,936	90.90%	1,944	6.56%	751	2.53%	24,992	84.34%	29,631
Total	294,185	90.28%	21,076	6.47%	10,608	3.25%	273,109	83.81%	325,869

== See also ==
- United States presidential elections in District of Columbia
- 2024 United States presidential election
- 2024 Democratic Party presidential primaries
- 2024 Republican Party presidential primaries
- 2024 Green Party presidential primaries
- 2024 United States elections
