= 2004 United States presidential election in the District of Columbia =

- November 2, 2004

Nominee	John Kerry	George W. Bush
Party	Democratic	Republican
Home state	Massachusetts	Texas
Running mate	John Edwards	Dick Cheney
Electoral vote	3	0
Popular vote	202,970	21,256
Percentage	89.18%	9.34%

Kerry
60–70%
70–80%
80–90%
90–100%
President before election
George W. Bush
Republican
Elected President
George W. Bush
Republican

The 2004 United States presidential election in the District of Columbia took place on November 2, 2004, as part of the 2004 United States presidential election. Voters chose three representatives, or electors to the Electoral College, who voted for president and vice president. Prior to the election, Washington DC was considered to be a jurisdiction Kerry would win or safely blue.

As expected, the District of Columbia voted by an extremely large margin in favor of the Democratic candidate John F. Kerry. John F. Kerry won DC by a margin of victory of 79.84% over the incumbent George W. Bush, more than any state. At the time, this was also the largest Democratic margin of victory over a Republican candidate in the history of the district, but has since been surpassed by all presidential elections since. The greatest victory margin of these subsequent years was in 2016. Such victory margins may perhaps be attributed to the fact that D.C. only encompasses an urban core area (and those are generally very liberal in nature). A recent San Francisco study based on the 2004 presidential election exit polls, ranked Washington, D.C. as the 4th most liberal city in the country. This information supports the fact that the District of Columbia has never voted for a Republican since the ratification of the 23rd Amendment.

As of 2024, this marks the last time that a Democratic presidential nominee would receive less than 90% of the vote in the District of Columbia.

== Primaries ==
- 2004 District of Columbia Democratic primary

== Campaign ==
=== Predictions ===
There were 12 news organizations that made state-by-state predictions of the election. Here are their last predictions before election day.

Source	Ranking
D.C. Political Report	Solid D
Associated Press	Solid D
CNN	Likely D
Cook Political Report	Solid D
Newsweek	Solid D
New York Times	Solid D
Rasmussen Reports	Likely D
Research 2000	Solid D
Washington Post	Likely D
Washington Times	Solid D
Zogby International	Likely D
Washington Dispatch	Likely D

== Results ==
2004 United States presidential election in the District of Columbia
Party	Candidate	Running mate	Votes	Percentage	Electoral votes
Democratic	John Kerry	John Edwards	202,970	89.18%	3
Republican	George W. Bush (incumbent)	Dick Cheney (incumbent)	21,256	9.34%	0
Independent	Ralph Nader	Peter Camejo	1,485	0.65%	0
Green	David Cobb	Pat LaMarche	737	0.32%	0
Libertarian	Michael Badnarik	Richard Campagna	502	0.22%	0
Others	Others	Others	636	0.28%	0
Totals			227,586	100.00%	3
Voter turnout			???		—

=== By ward ===
Ward	John Kerry Democratic		George W. Bush Republican		Other candidates Various parties		Margin		Total votes cast
Ward	#	%	#	%	#	%	#	%	Total votes cast
Ward 1	23,727	90.92%	1,751	6.71%	618	2.37%	21,976	84.21%	26,096
Ward 2	20,691	82.99%	3,713	14.89%	529	2.12%	16,978	68.10%	24,933
Ward 3	28,358	78.79%	6,953	19.32%	682	1.89%	21,405	59.47%	35,993
Ward 4	30,341	92.37%	2,156	6.56%	352	1.07%	28,185	85.81%	32,849
Ward 5	27,348	93.73%	1,520	5.21%	309	1.06%	25,828	88.52%	29,177
Ward 6	25,654	86.86%	3,339	11.31%	541	1.83%	22,315	75.55%	29,534
Ward 7	25,914	95.58%	1,006	3.71%	192	0.71%	24,908	91.87%	27,112
Ward 8	19,872	96.08%	689	3.33%	122	0.59%	19,183	92.75%	20,683
Total	201,905	89.18%	21,127	9.34%	3,345	1.48%	180,778	79.84%	226,377

== Electors ==
Technically the voters of D.C. cast their ballots for electors: representatives to the Electoral College. D.C. is allocated 3 electors. All candidates who appear on the ballot or qualify to receive write-in votes must submit a list of 3 electors, who pledge to vote for their candidate and his or her running mate. Whoever wins the majority of votes in the state is awarded all 3 electoral votes. Their chosen electors then vote for president and vice president. Although electors are pledged to their candidate and running mate, they are not obligated to vote for them. An elector who votes for someone other than his or her candidate is known as a faithless elector.

The electors of each state and the District of Columbia met on December 13, 2004, to cast their votes for president and vice president. The Electoral College itself never meets as one body. Instead the electors from each state and the District of Columbia met in their respective capitols.

The following were the members of the Electoral College from D.C. All were pledged to and voted for John Kerry and John Edwards.

1. Linda W. Cropp
2. Jack Evans
3. Arrington L. Dixon

== See also ==
- United States presidential elections in the District of Columbia
