= 1972 United States presidential election in the District of Columbia =

- November 7, 1972

Nominee	George McGovern	Richard Nixon
Party	Democratic	Republican
Home state	South Dakota	California
Running mate	Sargent Shriver	Spiro Agnew
Electoral vote	3	0
Popular vote	127,627	35,226
Percentage	78.10%	21.56%
Ward results
McGovern
50–60%
70–80%
80–90%
90–100%
President before election
Richard Nixon
Republican
Elected President
Richard Nixon
Republican

The 1972 United States presidential election in the District of Columbia took place on November 7, 1972, as part of the 1972 United States presidential election in which all 50 states plus the District of Columbia participated. Washington, D.C. voters chose 3 electors to represent them in the Electoral College via a popular vote pitting incumbent Republican President Richard Nixon and his running mate, incumbent Vice President Spiro Agnew, against Democratic challenger and Senator George McGovern from South Dakota and his running mate, former United States Ambassador to France Sargent Shriver.

McGovern won D.C. by an overwhelming margin, receiving 78.10% of the vote. Along with Massachusetts, the District of Columbia was the only jurisdiction with electoral votes in the country that voted for George McGovern in the general election. Despite McGovern's overwhelming victory in the District, this is the only election, as of 2024, in which the Republican nominee received more than 20% of the vote in D.C., or the Democratic margin of victory was less than 60%; and it is one of only two elections in which the Democratic nominee fell short of 80% of the vote, along with the three-way election of 1980. Nixon managed a victory in one of the district's eight wards, Ward 3. Nixon's 35,226 votes remain the most raw votes any Republican nominee has ever received in D.C.

This was one of only two elections where Washington, D.C. wasn't the largest margin for either candidate along with 1964, this time being second to a 58.57% margin for Nixon in Mississippi.

== Results ==
1972 United States presidential election in the District of Columbia
Party	Candidate	Votes	%	±%
Democratic	George McGovern Sargent Shriver	127,627	78.10%	−3.72%
Republican	Richard Nixon (incumbent) Spiro Agnew (incumbent)	35,226	21.56%	+3.38%
Socialist Workers	Linda Jenness Andrew Pulley	316	0.19%	+0.19%
Communist	Gus Hall Jarvis Tyner	252	0.15%	+0.15%
Total votes		163,421	100.00%	-

== See also ==
- United States presidential elections in the District of Columbia
- 1972 United States presidential election in Massachusetts, the only other place that voted Democratic in the 1972 presidential election.
