= 2020 United States presidential election in the District of Columbia =

- November 3, 2020
- Turnout: 66.9% ▲

Nominee	Joe Biden	Donald Trump
Party	Democratic	Republican
Home state	Delaware	Florida
Running mate	Kamala Harris	Mike Pence
Electoral vote	3	0
Popular vote	317,323	18,586
Percentage	92.15%	5.40%

Biden
70–80%
80–90%
90–100%
President before election
Donald Trump
Republican
Elected President
Joe Biden
Democratic

The District of Columbia participated in the 2020 United States presidential election with the other 50 states on Tuesday, November 3. District of Columbia voters chose electors to represent them in the Electoral College via a popular vote, pitting the Republican Party's nominee, incumbent President Donald Trump, and running mate Vice President Mike Pence against Democratic Party nominee, former Vice President Joe Biden, and his running mate California Senator Kamala Harris. The District of Columbia has three electoral votes in the Electoral College. Prior to the election, Biden was considered to be all but certain to win D.C.

The nation's capital is overwhelmingly Democratic and has voted for the Democratic nominee by massive margins in every presidential election it has participated in, ever since it was first granted electors by the passage of the Twenty-third Amendment in 1961. Biden's 86.75-point margin of victory was virtually identical to that secured by Hillary Clinton in 2016.

Nevertheless, the District shifted by 0.02% to the right compared with the previous election, likely due to a decline in third-party voting, making Biden the first non-incumbent Democrat since 1988 to win D.C. by a smaller margin than in the previous cycle. Biden still received the second-highest share of the vote in D.C., behind only Obama in 2008. Along with seven states, (Note: Those states were Arkansas, California, Florida, Hawaii, Illinois, Nevada, and Utah.) it was one of eight jurisdictions where Trump improved on his 2016 margins.

== Primary elections ==
The District of Columbia held primary elections on June 2, 2020.

=== Republican primary ===
Donald Trump ran unopposed in the Republican primary, and thus received all of the district's 19 delegates to the 2020 Republican National Convention.

=== Democratic primary ===
Popular vote share by ward
Biden—60–70%
Biden—70–80%
Biden—80–90%

Popular vote share by precinct
Biden—50–60%
Biden—60–70%
Biden—70–80%
Biden—80–90%
Biden—>90%

2020 District of Columbia Democratic presidential primary
Candidate	Votes	%	Delegates
Joe Biden	84,093	75.97	19
Elizabeth Warren (withdrawn)	14,228	12.85	1
Bernie Sanders (withdrawn)	11,116	10.04	
Tulsi Gabbard (withdrawn)	442	0.40	
Write-in votes	809	0.73	
Total	110,688	100%	20

== General election ==
=== Final predictions ===
Source	Ranking
The Cook Political Report	Solid D
Inside Elections	Solid D
Sabato's Crystal Ball	Safe D
Politico	Solid D
RCP	Solid D
Niskanen	Safe D
CNN	Solid D
The Economist	Safe D
CBS News	Likely D
270towin	Safe D
ABC News	Solid D
NPR	Likely D
NBC News	Solid D
538	Solid D

=== Polling ===
==== Graphical summary ====
View source data.

==== Aggregate polls ====
Source of poll aggregation	Dates administered	Dates updated	Joe Biden Democratic	Donald Trump Republican	Other/ Undecided (Note: Calculated by taking the difference of 100% and all other candidates combined.)	Margin
FiveThirtyEight	until November 2, 2020	November 3, 2020	90.8%	5.8%	3.4%	Biden +85.0

==== Polls ====
Poll source	Date(s) administered	Sample size (Note: Key: A – all adults RV – registered voters LV – likely voters V – unclear)	Margin of error	Donald Trump Republican	Joe Biden Democratic	Jo Jorgensen Libertarian	Howie Hawkins Green	Other	Undecided
SurveyMonkey/Axios	Oct 20 – Nov 2, 2020	495 (LV)	± 6%	5% (Note: Overlapping sample with the previous SurveyMonkey/Axios poll, but more information available regarding sample size)	94%	–	–	–	–
SurveyMonkey/Axios	Oct 1–28, 2020	969 (LV)	–	9%	89%	–	–	–	–
SurveyMonkey/Axios	Sep 1–30, 2020	343 (LV)	–	12%	86%	–	–	–	2%
SurveyMonkey/Axios	Aug 1–31, 2020	252 (LV)	–	16%	83%	–	–	–	2%
SurveyMonkey/Axios	Jul 1–31, 2020	290 (LV)	–	8%	91%	–	–	–	1%
SurveyMonkey/Axios	Jun 8–30, 2020	151 (LV)	–	11%	87%	–	–	–	3%

=== Results ===
2020 United States presidential election in the District of Columbia
Party	Candidate	Votes	%	±%
Democratic	Joe Biden Kamala Harris	317,323	92.15	+1.29
Republican	Donald Trump Mike Pence	18,586	5.40	+1.31
Write-in		3,137	0.91	–1.19
Libertarian	Jo Jorgensen Spike Cohen	2,036	0.59	–0.99
Green	Howie Hawkins Angela Walker	1,726	0.50	–0.87
Independent	Gloria La Riva Sunil Freeman	855	0.25	+0.25
Independent	Brock Pierce Karla Ballard	693	0.20	+0.20
Total votes		344,356	100.00	+1.60

==== Results by ward ====
Ward	Joe Biden Democratic		Donald Trump Republican		Other candidates Various parties		Margin		Total votes cast
Ward	#	%	#	%	#	%	#	%	Total votes cast
Ward 1	39,041	93.67%	1,725	4.14%	915	2.19%	37,316	89.53%	41,681
Ward 2	29,078	88.43%	2,918	8.87%	885	2.70%	26,160	79.56%	32,881
Ward 3	39,397	89.07%	3,705	8.38%	1,129	2.55%	35,692	80.69%	44,231
Ward 4	42,489	93.80%	1,913	4.22%	894	1.98%	40,576	89.58%	45,296
Ward 5	43,320	93.96%	1,769	3.84%	1,018	2.20%	41,551	90.12%	46,107
Ward 6	56,719	90.15%	4,337	6.89%	1,862	2.96%	52,382	83.26%	62,918
Ward 7	36,382	94.78%	1,134	2.95%	868	2.27%	35,248	91.83%	38,384
Ward 8	30,897	94.03%	1,085	3.30%	876	2.67%	29,812	90.73%	32,858
Total	317,323	92.15%	18,586	5.40%	8,447	2.45%	298,737	86.75%	344,356

== See also ==
- United States presidential elections in the District of Columbia
- 2020 District of Columbia elections
- 2020 United States elections
  - 2020 United States presidential election
    - 2020 Democratic Party presidential primaries
    - 2020 Republican Party presidential primaries
