= 1976 United States presidential election in the District of Columbia =

- November 2, 1976

Nominee	Jimmy Carter	Gerald Ford
Party	Democratic	Republican
Home state	Georgia	Michigan
Running mate	Walter Mondale	Bob Dole
Electoral vote	3	0
Popular vote	137,818	27,873
Percentage	81.63%	16.51%
Ward results
Carter
50–60%
70–80%
80–90%
90–100%
President before election
Gerald Ford
Republican
Elected President
Jimmy Carter
Democratic

The 1976 United States presidential election in the District of Columbia took place on November 2, 1976, as part of the 1976 United States presidential election in order to select the District of Columbia's three electoral votes for President of the United States. Democrat Jimmy Carter won the District by an overwhelming margin.

== Results ==
1976 United States presidential election in the District of Columbia
Party	Candidate	Votes	%	±%
Democratic	Jimmy Carter Walter Mondale	137,818	81.63%	
Republican	Gerald Ford (incumbent) Bob Dole	27,873	16.51%	
Socialist Workers	Peter Camejo Willie Mae Reid	545	0.32%	
All Others	All Others	2,594	1.54%	{{{change}}}
Total votes		168,830	100.00%	

== See also ==
- United States presidential elections in the District of Columbia
