= 2000 United States presidential election in the District of Columbia =

- November 7, 2000

Nominee	Al Gore	George W. Bush	Ralph Nader
Party	Democratic	Republican	Green
Home state	Tennessee	Texas	Connecticut
Running mate	Joe Lieberman	Dick Cheney	Winona LaDuke
Electoral vote	2 (Note: Electors were elected to all 3 of the District of Columbia's apportioned positions; however, one elector pledged to the Gore/Lieberman ticket cast a blank ballot.)	0	0
Popular vote	171,923	18,073	10,576
Percentage	85.16%	8.95%	5.24%

Gore
50–60%
60–70%
70–80%
80–90%
90–100%
President before election
Bill Clinton
Democratic
Elected President
George W. Bush
Republican

The 2000 United States presidential election in the District of Columbia took place on November 7, 2000, as part of the 2000 United States presidential election. Voters chose three representatives, or electors to the Electoral College, who voted for president and vice president.

The District of Columbia voted by an extremely large margin in favor of the D.C. born, Democratic candidate Al Gore with 85.16% of the vote. Bush got 8.95% with 18,073 votes compared to Nader who got 5.24% with 10,576 votes. A total of 44% of the population came out to vote. The District of Columbia has never voted for a Republican, however, one Democratic elector abstained from casting a vote, bringing the district's electoral vote total down from 3 to 2. The District and neighboring Maryland were the only jurisdictions where Gore improved upon Bill Clinton's performance.

This election is one of three occasions where only two electoral votes were cast by a place in a presidential election: the others were in Mississippi in 1820, as one of the state's three electors died before the Electoral College convened and there was insufficient time to find a replacement; and in Nevada in 1864 due to one of the electors getting snowbound and there being no law to replace him.

== Results ==
2000 United States presidential election in the District of Columbia
Party	Candidate	Running mate	Votes	Percentage	Electoral votes
Democratic	Al Gore	Joe Lieberman	171,923	85.16%	2
Republican	George W. Bush	Dick Cheney	18,073	8.95%	0
D.C. Statehood Green	Ralph Nader	Winona LaDuke	10,576	5.24%	0
Libertarian	Harry Browne	Art Oliver	669	0.33%	0
	write-ins		539	0.27%	0
Socialist Workers Party	James Harris	Margaret Trowe	114	0.06%	0
Totals			201,894	100.00%	2
Voter turnout			44%		—

== See also ==
- United States presidential elections in the District of Columbia
