= Barbara Lett-Simmons =

American politician

Member of the District of Columbia Board of Education
- In office 1974–1986

Personal details
- Born: Barbara Lett; June 4, 1927 Battle Creek, Michigan, U.S.
- Died: December 22, 2012 (aged 85) Washington, D.C., U.S.
- Party: Democratic
- Spouse: Samuel J. Simmons
- Children: 2
- Education: Western Michigan University
- Occupation: Politician; educator; activist
- Known for: Faithless elector in 2000 US Presidential Election

Barbara Lett-Simmons (née Lett; June 4, 1927 – December 22, 2012) was an American politician and educator in Washington, D.C. A member of the district's Board of Education from 1974 to 1986, she was active in the Democratic Party. In 2000, she served as a presidential elector for Washington, D.C. in that year's presidential election, and notably became a faithless elector when she cast a blank ballot as a protest against the district's lack of voting representation in Congress.

== Early life ==
Barbara Lett was born in Battle Creek, Michigan, in 1927. She was an alumna of Western Michigan University which she graduated from in 1949. She taught elementary school in Detroit before moving to Washington in 1962, then worked as an elementary school teacher in Montgomery County, Maryland, until 1965. She worked as an educational coordinator for the United Planning Organization, a community services and empowerment organization and for a District of Columbia poverty program. She was also the host of a local radio talk show and a cable television program.

Lett-Simmons was a consultant helping to lead the search that led to the appointment of Barbara D. Sizemore as District of Columbia superintendent of schools in 1973. She was elected to the District of Columbia board of education in 1973, in which she served from 1974 to 1986.

== Board of Education ==
On April to October 1978, Lett-Simmons was the subject of a drama of operatic proportions, when the school board meetings were held to look at the future of superintendent Barbara A. Sizemore, who was appointed in 1973. She was a defender of Sizemore. The superintendent, Sizemore was fired and was replaced by Vincent E. Reed. Lett-Simmons wrote a letter to The Washington Post, in which she complained about a travesty of justice and questioned whether the newspaper's editorial board opposed Sizemore because she was black and female.

In 1977, she said, "For years people wanted to suggest politics was a nasty word". Her opinion said, "the schools are the most significant institution in society, and necessarily education must be politicized".

In 1978, Lett-Simmons helped to launch a piano competition for District of Columbia public school students.

In 1982, she criticized a plan for a closing school, saying it favored schools in predominately white sections of the city. Lett-Simmons often clashed with school superintendents and other board members.

Lett-Simmons was defeated for re-election in the District of Columbia board of education in 1985.

She was part of a vanguard of public officials who sought to leave their mark on the city. Lett-Simmons aims were to broaden opportunities for inner city children, expand vocational training and make the schools more accountable to residents.

== Political career ==
She was a delegate to the Democratic National Convention starting from the 1970s until her death in 2012. She ran unsuccessfully for the Council of the District of Columbia in 1982 and 1984. Lett-Simmons helped lead a 2004 petition effort to recall D.C. mayor Anthony A. Williams. In 1990, she failed a bid to become District of Columbia's nonvoting delegate in Congress which she lost to Eleanor Holmes Norton.

=== Faithless elector ===
A Democratic elector from the District of Columbia in the 2000 United States presidential election, she cast a blank ballot in the Electoral College rather than vote for Al Gore for president and Joe Lieberman for vice president as was expected, in protest of the District of Columbia's lack of a voting representative in Congress.

Lett-Simmons's Electoral College abstention, the first since 1864, was intended to protest what Lett-Simmons referred to as the federal district's "colonial status".

Lett-Simmons described her blank ballot as an act of civil disobedience, not an act of a faithless elector; Lett-Simmons supported Gore and said she would have voted for him if she had thought he had a chance to win.

== Family ==
She was the widow of Samuel J. Simmons, who died in 2003, former Assistant Secretary for the Office of Fair Housing and Equal Opportunity at the U.S. Department of Housing and Urban Development. She was married to Samuel J. Simmons for 53 years. Both of her sons, David C. Simmons, the chief administration law judge of the District of Columbia Commission on Human Rights and Robert A. Simmons, both work in Washington, D. C. She had a brother and granddaughter.

== Death ==
Lett-Simmons died on December 22, 2012, at age 85 in Washington Hospital Center. Her son, David C. Simmons said she had a heart ailment.

On January 3, 2013, hundreds gathered at Shiloh Baptist Church to pay tribute to Lett-Simmons. Mayor of the District of Columbia, Vincent C. Gray urged people in the gathering to follow Lett-Simmons example, stating, "If you want to celebrate Barbara’s legacy, do it by standing up and fighting until we get statehood."
