= 1968 United States presidential election in the District of Columbia =

- November 5, 1968

Nominee	Hubert Humphrey	Richard Nixon
Party	Democratic	Republican
Home state	Minnesota	New York (Note: Although he was born in California and he served as a U.S. senator from California, in 1968 Richard Nixon's official state of residence was New York, because he moved there to practice law after his defeat in the 1962 California gubernatorial election. During his first term as president, Nixon re-established his residency in California. Consequently, most reliable reference books list Nixon's home state as New York in the 1968 election and his home state as California in the 1972 (and 1960) election.)
Running mate	Edmund Muskie	Spiro Agnew
Electoral vote	3	0
Popular vote	139,566	31,012
Percentage	81.82%	18.18%

Humphrey
50–60%
70–80%
80–90%
90–100%
Nixon
50–60%
60–70%
President before election
Lyndon B. Johnson
Democratic
Elected President
Richard Nixon
Republican

The 1968 United States presidential election in the District of Columbia took place on November 5, 1968, as part of the 1968 United States presidential election. District of Columbia voters chose three representatives, or electors, to the Electoral College, who voted for president and vice president.

Vice President Hubert Humphrey won Washington, D.C. by an overwhelming margin, receiving over 80% of the vote.

This was the second presidential election in which the District of Columbia had the right to vote in presidential elections, as well as the only place where George Wallace did not have his name on the ballot. This remains the only presidential election in which the Republican nominee received a higher percentage of the vote in DC than at least one state in that same election as Nixon performed 5% better in Washington, D.C. than he did in both Mississippi and Alabama.

== Campaign ==
George Wallace announced his intention to run under the American Independent Party at a press conference in Washington, D.C. on February 8, 1968. Another event that happened also in the District was President Lyndon B. Johnson announcing from the Oval Office in the White House that he would not run for a second term on March 31.

== Results ==
1968 United States presidential election in the District of Columbia
Party	Candidate	Running mate	Popular vote		Electoral vote	
Party	Candidate	Running mate	Count	%	Count	%
Democratic	Hubert Humphrey of Minnesota	Edmund Muskie of Maine	139,566	81.82%	3	100.00%
Republican	Richard Nixon of New York	Spiro Agnew of Maryland	31,012	18.18%	0	0.00%
Total			170,578	100.00%	3	100.00%

== See also ==
- United States presidential elections in the District of Columbia
