= 2012 United States presidential election in the District of Columbia =

- November 6, 2012
- Turnout: 60.94%

| Nominee | Barack Obama | Mitt Romney |
| Party | Democratic | Republican |
| Home state | Illinois | Massachusetts |
| Running mate | Joe Biden | Paul Ryan |
| Electoral vote | 3 | 0 |
| Popular vote | 267,070 | 21,381 |
| Percentage | 90.91% | 7.28% |

Obama
60–70%
70–80%
80–90%
90–100%
President before election
Barack Obama
Democratic
Elected President
Barack Obama
Democratic

The 2012 United States presidential election in the District of Columbia took place on November 6, 2012, as part of the 2012 United States presidential election in which all 50 states and the District of Columbia participated. D.C. voters chose three electors to represent them in the Electoral College via a popular vote pitting incumbent Democratic President Barack Obama and his running mate, Vice President Joe Biden, against Republican challenger and former Massachusetts Governor Mitt Romney and his running mate, Congressman Paul Ryan. Prior to the election, Washington D.C. was considered to be a definite win for Obama; the nation's capital is heavily Democratic and has always voted for Democratic nominees for president by overwhelming margins.

Obama and Biden carried the District of Columbia with 90.9% of the popular vote to Romney's and Ryan's 7.3%, thus winning the district's three electoral votes.

== Primary elections ==
=== Democratic primary ===
2012 District of Columbia Democratic presidential primary
- April 3, 2012

45 delegates (22 pledged and 23 unpledged) to the Democratic National Convention

| Candidate | Barack Obama | Uncommitted |
| Home state | Illinois | N/A |
| Delegate count | 45 | 0 |
| Popular vote | 56,503 | 1,100 |
| Percentage | 96.23% | 1.87% |
- Detailed results by precincts, wards and municipal districts

President Obama was the only candidate in the primary. The District cast all 45 of its delegate votes at the 2012 Democratic National Convention for Obama. Obama won every vote in three precincts: 79, 96 and 119. He performed the worst in Precinct 2, where the George Washington University and the White House are located.

District of Columbia Democratic primary, 2012
| Candidate | Votes | Percentage | Delegates |
|---|---|---|---|
| Barack Obama (incumbent) | 56,503 | 96.23% | 22 |
| Uncommitted | 1,100 | 1.87% | 0 |
| Under votes | 725 | 1.23% | 0 |
| Write-ins | 386 | 0.66% | 0 |
| Unpledged delegates: | | | 23 |
| Total: | 58,714 | 100% | 45 |

==== Results by ward ====
Running virtually unchallenged, Obama swept all of the capital's eight wards with more than 90% of the vote. He performed best in Wards 7 and 8 in DC's southeast part, securing more than 99% of the vote in each. Conversely, he earned his worst results in Wards 2 and 3, falling below 95% of the vote.

| District | Obama | Uncommitted |
|---|---|---|
| Ward 1 | 97.04% | 2.16% |
| Ward 2 | 94.37% | 4.01% |
| Ward 3 | 94.14% | 4.14% |
| Ward 4 | 97.94% | 1.59% |
| Ward 5 | 98.95% | 1.18% |
| Ward 6 | 96.95% | 2.22% |
| Ward 7 | 99.01% | 0.79% |
| Ward 8 | 99.08% | 0.74% |

=== Republican primary ===
2012 District of Columbia Republican presidential primary
- April 3, 2012

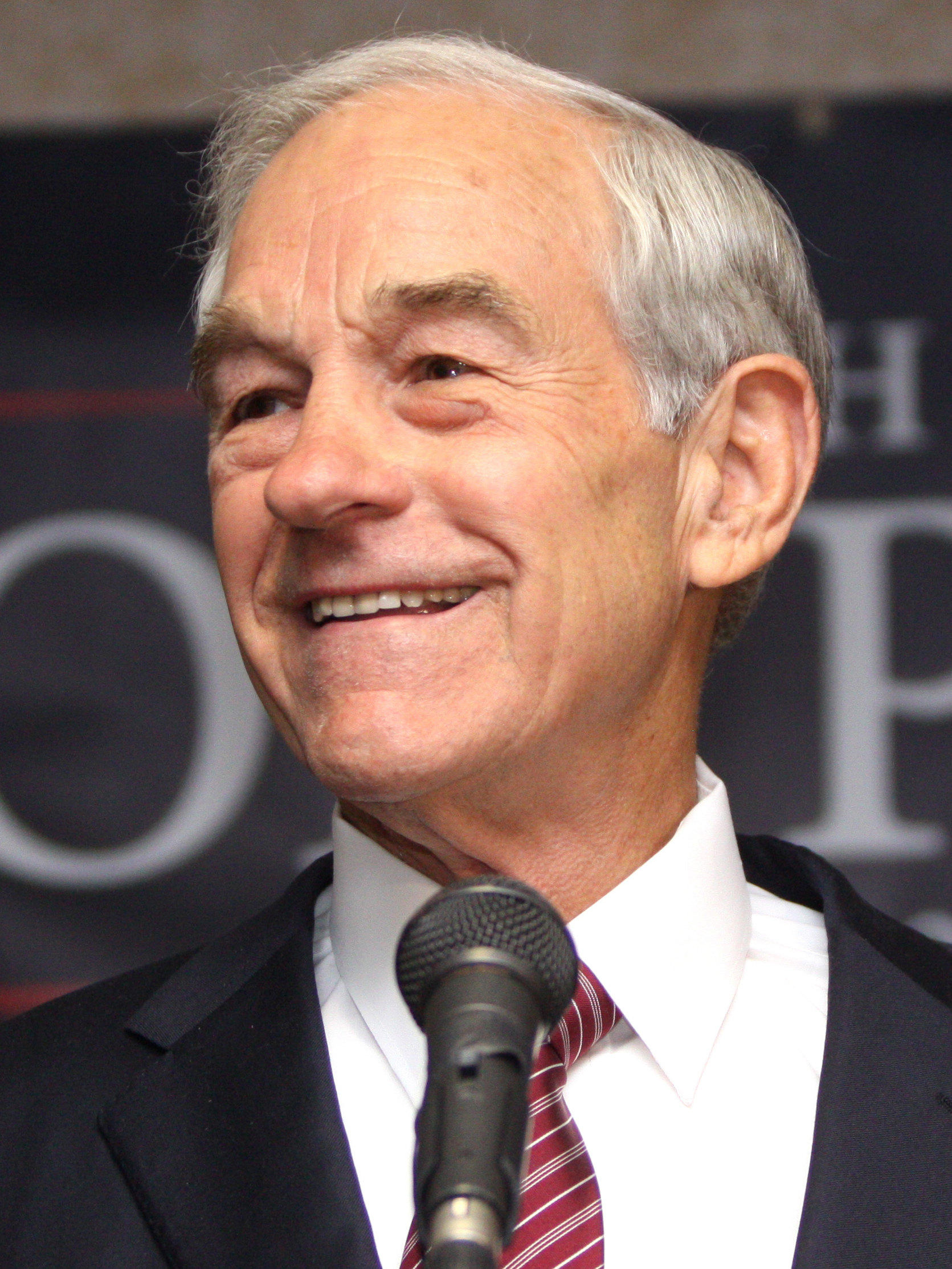

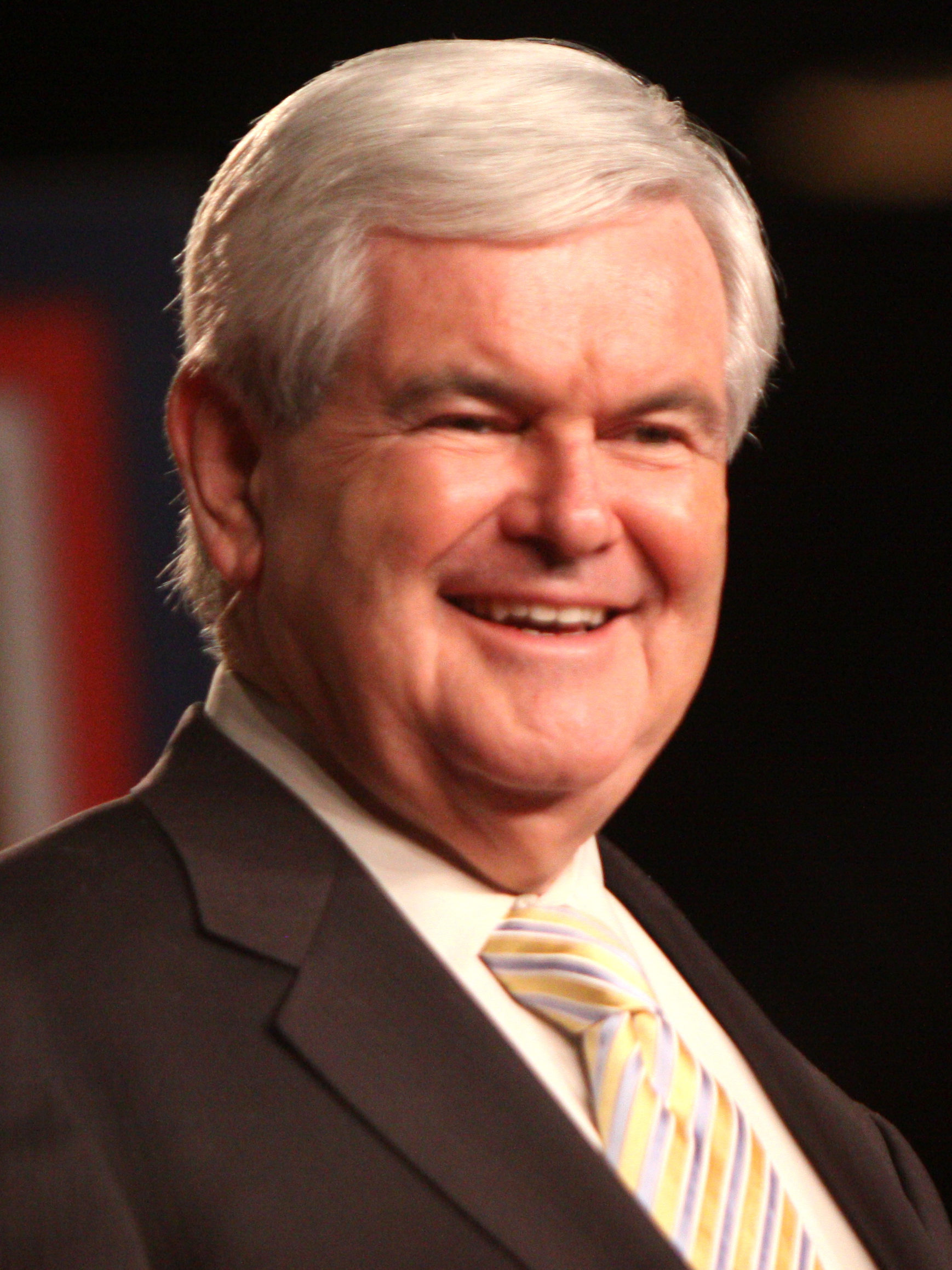

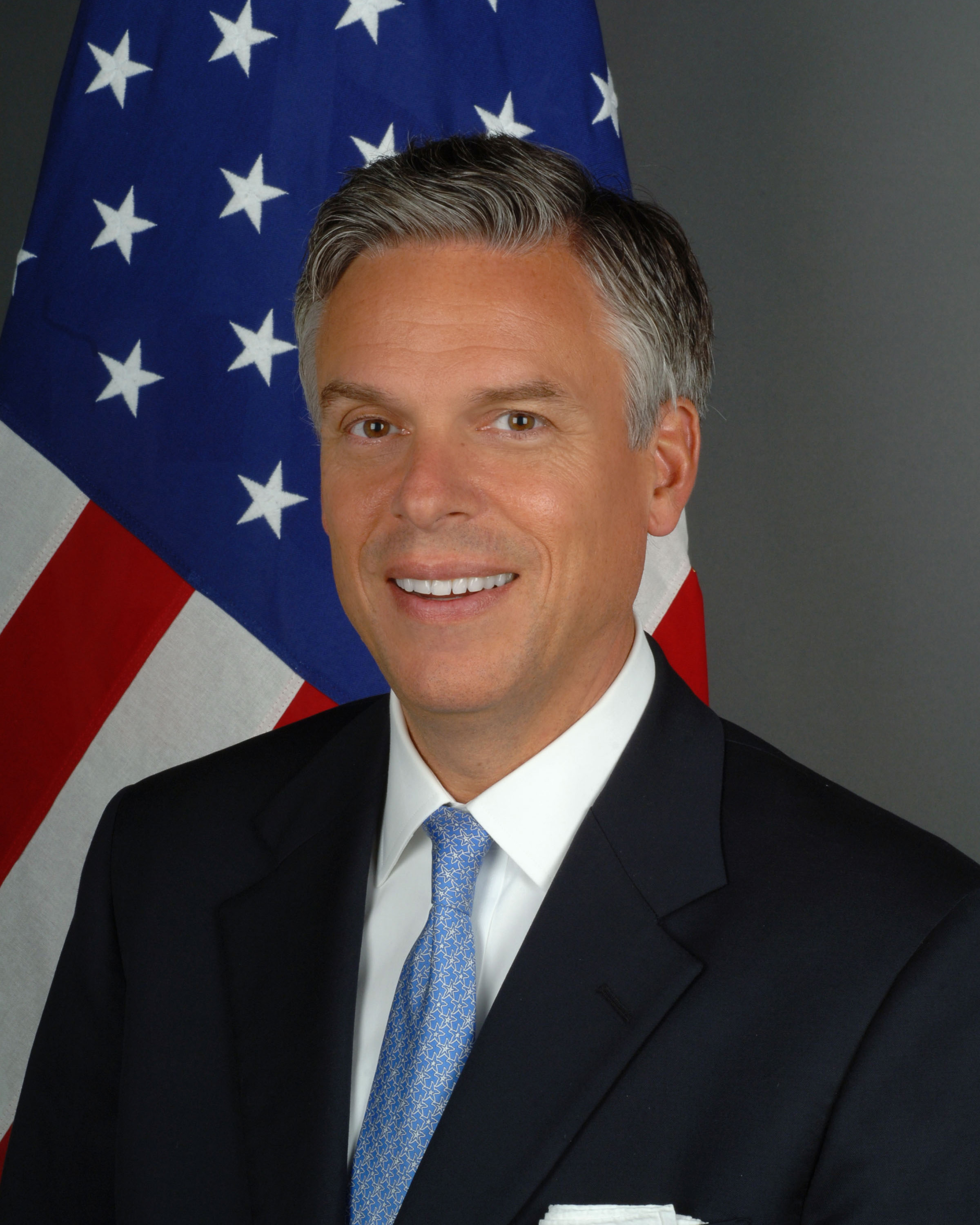
| Candidate | Mitt Romney | Ron Paul |
| Home state | Massachusetts | Texas |
| Delegate count | 18 | 0 |
| Popular vote | 3,577 | 621 |
| Percentage | 70.08% | 12.17% |
| Candidate | Newt Gingrich | Jon Huntsman |
| Home state | Georgia | Utah |
| Delegate count | 0 | 0 |
| Popular vote | 558 | 348 |
| Percentage | 10.93% | 6.82% |
- District of Columbia results by ward Mitt Romney (Note: Italicization indicates a withdrawn candidacy)

The 2012 District of Columbia Republican presidential primary was held on April 3, 2012, the same day as the Maryland and Wisconsin Republican primaries.

The District of Columbia Republican Party required a $5,000 contribution, signatures from one percent of registered Republicans, and the names of 16 potential delegates and 16 alternate delegates, who then must register with the District of Columbia Office of Campaign Finance. Alternatively, under II.D.1(c) a candidate need not file signatures with a $10,000 contribution. The District of Columbia Republican Party certified Newt Gingrich and Ron Paul in lieu of petitions under II.D.1(c). Rick Santorum was not included on the ballot because he did not meet these requirements.

The District of Columbia Republican Party decided not to allow write-in votes for the primary.

The candidate with the most votes in the primary, Mitt Romney, was awarded sixteen delegates. Romney received the most votes in each of the District of Columbia's eight wards, receiving the majority of votes in wards 1, 2, 3, 4, and 6, and a plurality of votes in wards 5, 7, and 8. Paul received the second most votes in wards 1, 2, 4, 5, 6, and 8, while Gingrich received the second most votes in wards 3 and 7. Romney also received the most votes, or tied for the most votes, in 129 of the 143 voting precincts.

The District of Columbia's three superdelegates are Chairman Bob Kabel, Republican National Committeewoman Betsy Werronen, and Republican National Committeeman Tony Parker. Kabel and Werronen both support Mitt Romney. Other delegates for the District of Columbia include Patrick Mara and Rachel Hoff.

Jill Homan and Bob Kabel were elected National Committeewoman and the National Committeeman, respectively. They will both take office after the end of the 2012 Republican National Convention.

2012 District of Columbia Republican presidential primary
| Candidate | Votes | Percentage | Delegates |
|---|---|---|---|
| Mitt Romney | 3,577 | 70.08% | 18 |
| Ron Paul | 621 | 12.17% | 0 |
| Newt Gingrich | 558 | 10.93% | 0 |
| Jon Huntsman | 348 | 6.82% | 0 |
| Unprojected delegates: | | | 1 |
| Under votes | 153 | | |
| Total: | 5,257 | 100% | 19 |

| Key: | Withdrew prior to contest |

== General election ==
=== Predictions ===
| Source | Ranking | As of |
|---|---|---|
| Huffington Post | Safe D | November 6, 2012 |
| CNN | Safe D | November 6, 2012 |
| New York Times | Safe D | November 6, 2012 |
| Washington Post | Safe D | November 6, 2012 |
| RealClearPolitics | Solid D | November 6, 2012 |
| Sabato's Crystal Ball | Solid D | November 5, 2012 |
| FiveThirtyEight | Solid D | November 6, 2012 |

=== Ballot access ===
- Mitt Romney/Paul Ryan, Republican
- Barack Obama/Joseph Biden, Democratic
- Gary Johnson/James P. Gray, Libertarian
- Jill Stein/Cheri Honkala, Green

Write-in candidate access:

- Virgil Goode/Jim Clymer, Constitution
- Rocky Anderson/Luis J. Rodriguez, Justice

=== Results ===
2012 United States presidential election in the District of Columbia
| Party | Candidate | Running mate | Votes | Percentage | Electoral votes |
|---|---|---|---|---|---|
| Democratic | Barack Obama (incumbent) | Joe Biden (incumbent) | 267,070 | 90.91% | 3 |
| Republican | Mitt Romney | Paul Ryan | 21,381 | 7.28% | 0 |
| Green | Jill Stein | Cheri Honkala | 2,458 | 0.84% | 0 |
| Libertarian | Gary Johnson | James P. Gray | 2,083 | 0.71% | 0 |
| Others | Others | Others | 772 | 0.26% | 0 |
| Totals | | | 293,764 | 100.00% | 3 |
| Voter turnout | | | ??? | | — |

=== By ward ===
| Ward | Barack Obama Democratic | | Mitt Romney Republican | | Other candidates Various parties | | Margin | | Total votes cast |
| Ward | # | % | # | % | # | % | # | % | Total votes cast |
|---|---|---|---|---|---|---|---|---|---|
| Ward 1 | 32,131 | 91.95% | 1,782 | 5.10% | 1,032 | 2.95% | 30,349 | 86.85% | 34,945 |
| Ward 2 | 24,096 | 80.86% | 4,876 | 16.36% | 829 | 2.78% | 19,220 | 64.50% | 29,801 |
| Ward 3 | 31,202 | 80.05% | 6,771 | 17.37% | 1,005 | 2.58% | 24,431 | 62.68% | 38,978 |
| Ward 4 | 36,864 | 94.19% | 1,674 | 4.28% | 601 | 1.53% | 35,190 | 89.91% | 39,139 |
| Ward 5 | 36,436 | 95.88% | 1,097 | 2.89% | 468 | 1.23% | 35,339 | 92.99% | 38,001 |
| Ward 6 | 38,825 | 87.31% | 4,620 | 10.39% | 1,024 | 2.30% | 34,205 | 76.92% | 44,469 |
| Ward 7 | 35,536 | 98.52% | 324 | 0.90% | 209 | 0.58% | 35,212 | 97.62% | 36,069 |
| Ward 8 | 31,980 | 98.82% | 237 | 0.73% | 145 | 0.45% | 31,743 | 98.09% | 32,362 |
| Total | 267,070 | 90.91% | 21,381 | 7.28% | 5,313 | 1.81% | 245,689 | 83.63% | 293,764 |

== See also ==
- United States presidential elections in the District of Columbia
- 2012 Republican Party presidential debates and forums
- 2012 Republican Party presidential primaries
- Results of the 2012 Republican Party presidential primaries
