= 1988 United States presidential election in the District of Columbia =

- November 8, 1988

| Nominee | Michael Dukakis | George H. W. Bush |
| Party | Democratic | Republican |
| Home state | Massachusetts | Texas |
| Running mate | Lloyd Bentsen | Dan Quayle |
| Electoral vote | 3 | 0 |
| Popular vote | 159,407 | 27,590 |
| Percentage | 82.65% | 14.30% |
Ward results
Dukakis
60–70%
70–80%
80–90%
90–100%
President before election
Ronald Reagan
Republican
Elected President
George H. W. Bush
Republican

The 1988 United States presidential election in the District of Columbia took place on November 8, 1988, as part of the 1988 United States presidential election. Voters chose three representatives, or electors, to the Electoral College, who voted for president and vice president.

Washington, D.C. overwhelmingly voted for Governor Michael Dukakis of Massachusetts, the Democratic candidate. Vice President George H. W. Bush received 14.3% of the vote. This is the most recent election in which the Republican candidate received more than 10% of the vote in the District of Columbia, and it was one of only two contests that shifted more Republican in 1988 compared to 1984, the other being Tennessee; D.C. shifted more Republican by 3.3 percentage points.

== Results ==
1988 United States presidential election in the District of Columbia
| Party | Candidate | Votes | Percentage | Electoral votes |
|---|---|---|---|---|
| Democratic | Michael Dukakis | 159,407 | 82.65% | 3 |
| Republican | George H. W. Bush | 27,590 | 14.30% | 0 |
| New Alliance | Lenora Fulani | 2,901 | 1.50% | 0 |
| Libertarian | Ron Paul | 554 | 0.29% | 0 |

== See also ==
- United States presidential elections in the District of Columbia
