= 1964 United States presidential election in the District of Columbia =

- November 3, 1964

Nominee	Lyndon B. Johnson	Barry Goldwater
Party	Democratic	Republican
Home state	Texas	Arizona
Running mate	Hubert Humphrey	William E. Miller
Electoral vote	3	0
Popular vote	169,796	28,801
Percentage	85.50%	14.50%

Johnson
50–60%
60–70%
70–80%
80–90%
90-100%
President before election
Lyndon B. Johnson
Democratic
Elected President
Lyndon B. Johnson
Democratic

The 1964 United States presidential election in the District of Columbia took place on November 3, 1964, as part of the 1964 United States presidential election. District of Columbia voters chose three representatives, or electors, to the Electoral College, who voted for president and vice president.

President Lyndon B. Johnson won Washington, D.C. by an overwhelming margin, receiving over 85% of the vote. This was the first presidential election in which the District of Columbia had the right to vote. The District of Columbia has voted Democratic by overwhelming margins every time since this election.

This was one of only two elections where Washington, D.C. wasn't the largest margin for either candidate along with 1972, this time being second to a 74.28% margin for Goldwater in Mississippi.

== Results ==
1964 United States presidential election in the District of Columbia
Party	Candidate	Running mate	Popular vote		Electoral vote	
Party	Candidate	Running mate	Count	%	Count	%
Democratic	Lyndon B. Johnson of Texas (incumbent)	Hubert Humphrey of Minnesota	169,796	85.50%	3	100.00%
Republican	Barry Goldwater of Arizona	William E. Miller of New York	28,801	14.50%	0	0.00%
Total			198,597	100.00%	3	100.00%

== See also ==
- United States presidential elections in the District of Columbia
