= 1996 United States presidential election in the District of Columbia =

- November 5, 1996

Nominee	Bill Clinton	Bob Dole
Party	Democratic	Republican
Home state	Arkansas	Kansas
Running mate	Al Gore	Jack Kemp
Electoral vote	3	0
Popular vote	158,220	17,339
Percentage	85.19%	9.34%
Ward results
Clinton
60–70%
70–80%
80–90%
90–100%
President before election
Bill Clinton
Democratic
Elected President
Bill Clinton
Democratic

The 1996 United States presidential election in the District of Columbia took place on November 5, 1996, as part of the 1996 United States presidential election. Voters chose three representatives, or electors to the Electoral College, who voted for president and vice president.

Washington, D.C. was won by President Bill Clinton (D) over Senator Bob Dole (R-KS), with Clinton winning 85.19% to 9.34% by a margin of 75.85%. Political activist Ralph Nader (Green Party) finished in third, with 2.57% of the popular vote, and businessman Ross Perot (Reform Party) finished in fourth, with 1.94%.

Washington, D.C. was again Ross Perot's worst performance in the country. This is also the only time Perot finished fourth in any location in either 1992 or 1996.

== Results ==
1996 United States presidential election in Washington, D. C.
Party	Candidate	Running mate	Votes	Percentage	Electoral votes
Democratic	Bill Clinton (incumbent)	Al Gore (incumbent)	158,220	85.19%	3
Republican	Bob Dole	Jack Kemp	17,339	9.34%	0
Green	Ralph Nader	Winona LaDuke	4,780	2.57%	0
Reform	Ross Perot	Patrick Choate	3,611	1.94%	0
No party	Write-in		648	0.35%	0
Libertarian	Harry Browne	Jo Jorgensen	588	0.32%	0
Natural Law	Dr. John Hagelin	Dr. V. Tompkins	283	0.15%	0
Socialist Workers Party	James Harris	Laura Garza	257	0.14%	0

== See also ==
- United States presidential elections in the District of Columbia
