= 1980 United States presidential election in the District of Columbia =

- November 4, 1980
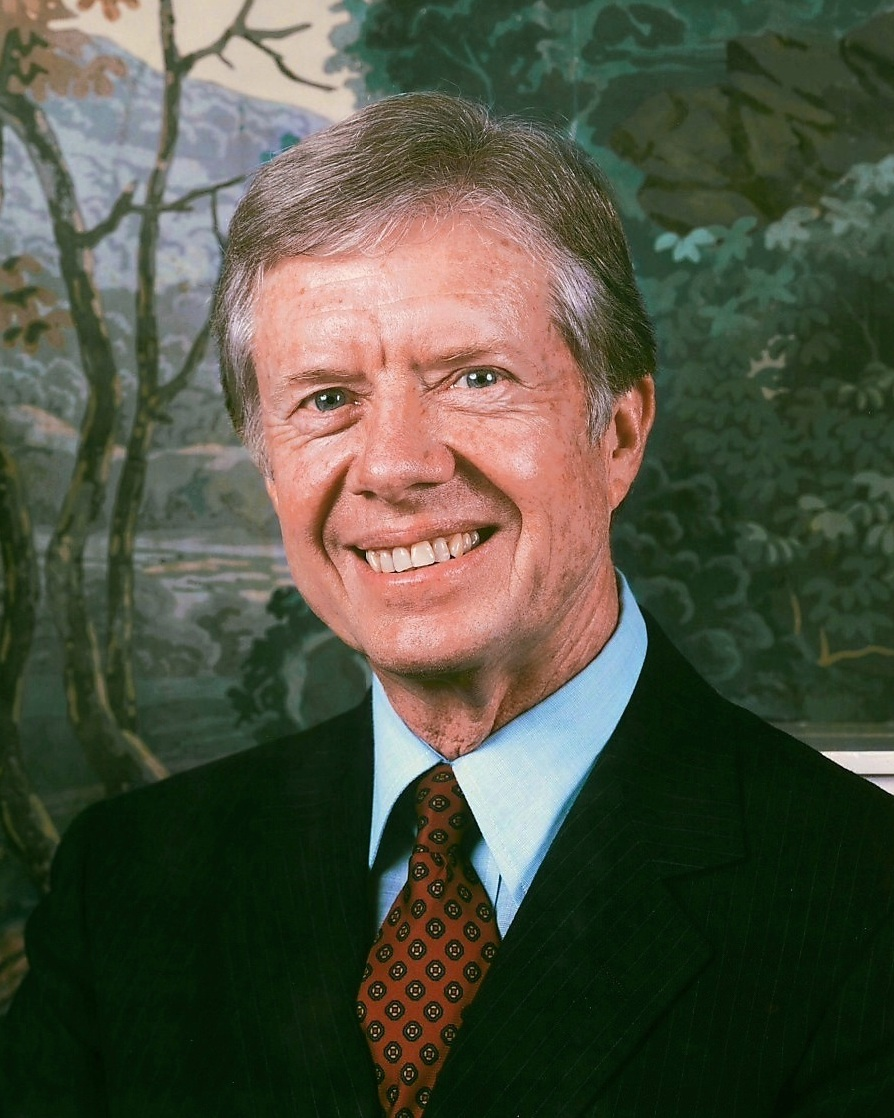

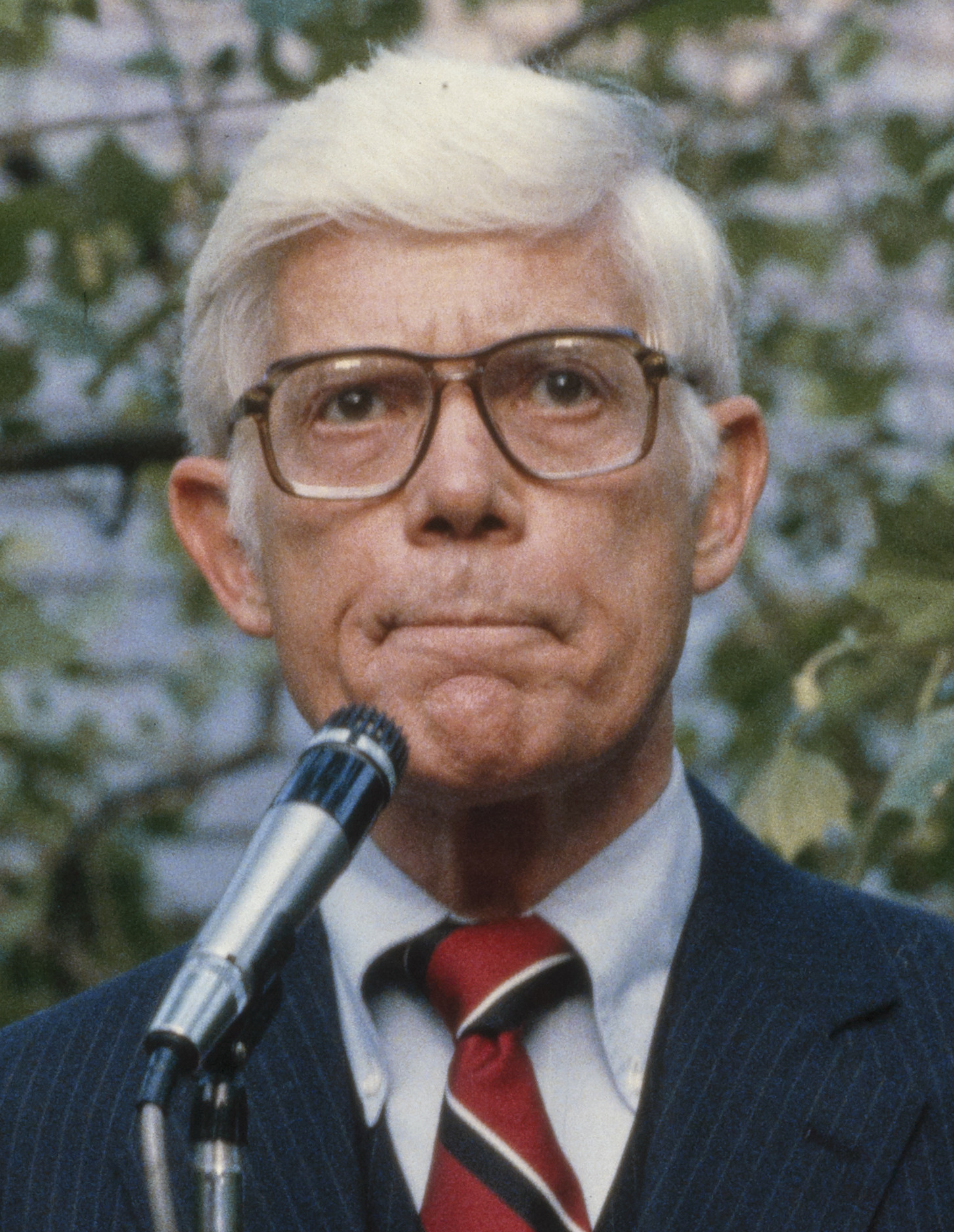
Nominee	Jimmy Carter	Ronald Reagan	John B. Anderson
Party	Democratic	Republican	Independent
Home state	Georgia	California	Illinois
Running mate	Walter Mondale	George H. W. Bush	Patrick Lucey
Electoral vote	3	0	0
Popular vote	130,231	23,313	16,131
Percentage	74.89%	13.41%	9.28%
Ward results
Carter
40–50%
60–70%
70–80%
80–90%
90–100%
President before election
Jimmy Carter
Democratic
Elected President
Ronald Reagan
Republican

The 1980 United States presidential election in the District of Columbia took place on November 4, 1980. All 50 states and The District of Columbia were part of the 1980 United States presidential election. Washington, D.C. voters chose 3 electors to the Electoral College, who voted for president and vice president.

Washington, D.C. was won by incumbent President Jimmy Carter (D) by a 61-point landslide.

Carter's 74.9% of the vote represents the lowest vote won by a Democrat in the District of Columbia, while also being the sole presidential election when the Democratic candidate (albeit very narrowly) did not earn at least 75% of the district's vote. Anderson's 9.3% is also the highest a non-major party candidate ever got in D.C.

== Results ==
1980 United States presidential election in the District of Columbia
Party	Candidate	Votes	%	±%
Democratic	Jimmy Carter (incumbent) Walter Mondale (incumbent)	130,231	74.89%	–6.74%
Republican	Ronald Reagan George H. W. Bush	23,313	13.41%	–3.10%
Independent	John B. Anderson Patrick Lucey	16,131	9.28%	
Citizens	Barry Commoner LaDonna Harris	1,826	1.05%	
Libertarian	Edward Clark David Koch	1,104	0.63%	
All Others	All Others	1,284	0.74%	
Total votes		173,889	100.00%	

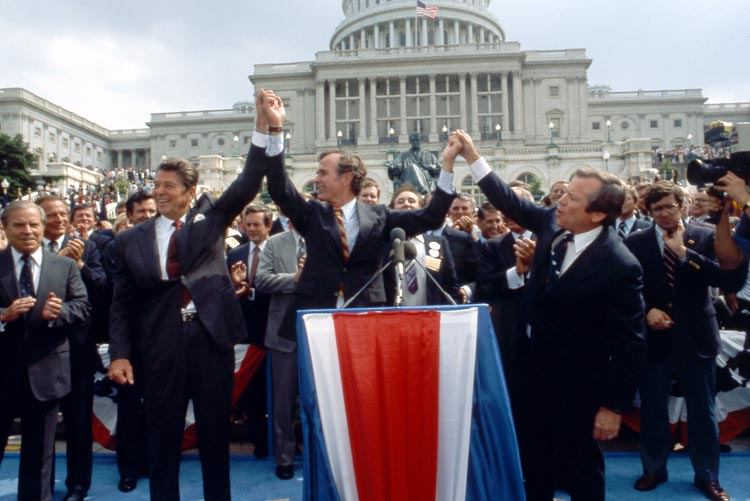
Ronald Reagan, George Bush and Howard Baker attend a campaign rally at the United States Capitol in Washington DC on September 15, 1980.

== See also ==
- United States presidential elections in the District of Columbia
