= 2016 United States presidential election in the District of Columbia =

- November 8, 2016
- Turnout: 65.3% ▲

Nominee	Hillary Clinton	Donald Trump
Party	Democratic	Republican
Home state	New York	New York
Running mate	Tim Kaine	Mike Pence
Electoral vote	3	0
Popular vote	282,830	12,723
Percentage	90.86%	4.09%

Clinton
70–80%
80–90%
90–100%
President before election
Barack Obama
Democratic
Elected President
Donald Trump
Republican

The 2016 United States presidential election in the District of Columbia was held on Tuesday, November 8, 2016, as part of the 2016 United States presidential election in which all fifty states and the District of Columbia participated. District of Columbia voters chose electors to represent them in the Electoral College via a popular vote, pitting the Republican Party's nominee, businessman Donald Trump, and running mate Indiana Governor Mike Pence against Democratic Party nominee, former Secretary of State Hillary Clinton, and her running mate Virginia Senator Tim Kaine. The District of Columbia has three electoral votes in the Electoral College. Prior to the election, Clinton was considered to be virtually certain to win Washington DC.

Clinton won the district with 282,830 votes, or 90.9%, thereby becoming the first presidential candidate to win over 95% of the district's two-party vote. Trump received 12,723 votes, or 4.1%, which is both the lowest popular vote total and the lowest share of the vote received by any Republican candidate since voters in the District were granted presidential electors under the Twenty-third Amendment.

Notably, Clinton's 86.77-point margin of victory also represented the largest secured by any major-party presidential candidate, in any jurisdiction, since Franklin D. Roosevelt's landslide re-election in 1944 in Mississippi. It is the largest ever in the district. Trump's 4.1% is the lowest vote share for a major party nominee since Alf Landon in the 1936 United States presidential election, and the lowest ever in the district. Along with 11 other states, the District of Columbia shifted towards the Democrats in this election.

== Primary elections ==
The incumbent President of the United States, Barack Obama, a Democrat and former U.S. Senator from Illinois, was first elected president in the 2008 election, running with former Senator Joe Biden of Delaware. Defeating the Republican nominee, Senator John McCain of Arizona, with 52.9% of the popular vote and 68% of the electoral vote, Obama succeeded two-term Republican President George W. Bush, the former Governor of Texas. Obama and Biden were reelected in the 2012 presidential election, defeating former Massachusetts Governor Mitt Romney with 51.1% of the popular vote and 61.7% of electoral votes. Although Barack Obama's approval rating in the RealClearPolitics poll tracking average remained between 40 and 50 percent for most of his second term, it experienced a surge in early 2016 and reached its highest point since 2012 during June of that year. Analyst Nate Cohn noted that a strong approval rating for President Obama would equate to a strong performance for the Democratic candidate, and vice versa.

Following his second term, President Obama was not eligible for another reelection. In October 2015, his running-mate and two-term Vice President Biden decided not to enter the race for the Democratic presidential nomination either. With their term expiring on January 20, 2017, the electorate was asked to elect a new president, the 45th president and 48th vice president of the United States, respectively.

=== Republican convention ===
Due to the small geographical size of the District of Columbia and the very small number of Republicans in the District, the local Republican party decided go directly to a "state convention", which took place at the Loews Madison Hotel at 1177 15th St NW from 10 a.m. – 4 p.m. The Convention/Caucus method was chosen because the June 14th primary was deemed too late, and DC would be penalized and only get 16 delegates.

District of Columbia Republican presidential convention, March 12, 2016
Candidate	Votes	Percentage	Actual delegate count		
Candidate	Votes	Percentage	Bound	Unbound	Total
Marco Rubio	1,059	37.3%	10	0	10
John Kasich	1,009	35.54%	9	0	9
Donald Trump	391	13.77%	0	0	0
Ted Cruz	351	12.36%	0	0	0
Jeb Bush (withdrawn)	14	0.49%	0	0	0
Rand Paul (withdrawn)	12	0.42%	0	0	0
Ben Carson (withdrawn)	3	0.11%	0	0	0
Unprojected delegates:			0	0	0
Total:	2,839	100%	19	0	19
Source: The Green Papers

=== Democratic primary ===
Results by ward Hillary Clinton

The Democratic primary was held June 14. The date was chosen because it was thought that by then the race would be over and the voters could then concentrate on local races.

==== Results ====
2016 Democratic Party's presidential nominating process in the District of Columbia – Summary of results –
Candidate	Popular vote		Estimated delegates		
Candidate	Count	Percentage	Pledged	Unpledged	Total
Hillary Clinton	76,704	77.95%	16	23	39
Bernie Sanders	20,361	20.69%	4	2	6
Roque "Rocky" De La Fuente	213	0.22%			
Under votes	611	0.62%			
Write-in	485	0.49%			
Over votes	24	0.02%			
Uncommitted	—N/a		0	0	0
Total	98,398	100%	20	25	45

===== By ward =====
County	Clinton	Votes	Sanders	Votes	Totals	TO%
Ward 1	73.8%	9,893	25.3%	3,181	12,563	24.34%
Ward 2	79.6%	7,294	19.4%	1,777	9,164	25.29%
Ward 3	77.1%	10,893	21.8%	3,087	14,135	32.00%
Ward 4	77.9%	12,863	20.7%	3,421	16,516	29.46%
Ward 5	78.2%	9,214	20.5%	2,419	11,779	19.89%
Ward 6	77.9%	11,898	20.9%	3,198	15,275	24.89%
Ward 7	82.1%	8,657	16.2%	1,707	10,548	18.82%
Ward 8	78.6%	6,612	18.7%	1,571	8,418	15.17%
Total	78.0%	76,704	20.7%	20,361	98,398	23.42%

===== Ballot controversy =====
On March 30, ten weeks ahead of the Washington D.C. primary, NBC affiliate News 4 reported that the Democratic Party's D.C. State Committee had submitted registration paperwork for listing presidential candidate Bernie Sanders on the primary ballots a day late, even though the Sanders campaign had correctly and timely registered with the state party. After a voter filed a challenge, this would possibly lead to Sanders' name being missing on the ballots. As the D.C. Council announced it would hold an emergency vote to put Sanders back on the ballots, and with Clinton's campaign chairman John Podesta asking to make sure an administrative error wouldn't exclude a candidate, D.C. Democratic Party chairwoman Anita Bonds told CNN that "Bernie will be on the ballot." She further explained that the party has always notified the D.C. board of elections a day after the deadline, with the only difference being that this time, someone challenged the inclusion of Sanders.

== General election ==
=== Voting history ===
The Twenty-third Amendment to the United States Constitution, ratified in 1961, grants the District of Columbia the right to choose presidential electors equal to the number from the least populous state (currently Wyoming's three). Since the amendment's ratification, the District of Columbia has cast its electoral votes for the Democratic candidate in every election. A Republican has never been the District's Mayor, and the current Council has 10 Democrats and two Independents.

=== Predictions ===
Source	Ranking	As of
Los Angeles Times	Safe D	November 6, 2016
CNN	Safe D	November 4, 2016
Cook Political Report	Safe D	November 7, 2016
Electoral-vote.com	Safe D	November 8, 2016
Sabato's Crystal Ball	Safe D	November 7, 2016
Fox News	Safe D	November 7, 2016

=== Results ===
2016 United States presidential election in the District of Columbia
Party	Candidate	Running mate	Popular vote		Electoral vote		Swing
Party	Candidate	Running mate	Count	%	Count	%	Swing
Democratic	Hillary Clinton of New York	Tim Kaine of Virginia	282,830	90.86%	3	100.00%	▼0.05%
Republican	Donald Trump of New York	Mike Pence of Indiana	12,723	4.09%	0	0.00%	▼3.19%
Write-in			6,551	2.10%	0	0.00%	
Libertarian	Gary Johnson of New Mexico	Bill Weld of Massachusetts	4,906	1.58%	0	0.00%	▲0.87%
Green	Jill Stein of Massachusetts	Ajamu Baraka of Illinois	4,258	1.37%	0	0.00%	▲0.53%
Total			311,268	100.00%	3	100.00%	

==== Results by ward ====
Ward	Hillary Clinton Democratic		Donald Trump Republican		Other candidates Various parties (Note: This category consists of the cumulative vote totals of Gary Johnson, Jill Stein, and all other write-in votes, which, when combined, has a higher vote total than Donald Trump. However, separately, none of the three mentioned above got more.)		Margin		Total votes cast
Ward	#	%	#	%	#	%	#	%	Total votes cast
Ward 1	37,490	92.50%	1,066	2.63%	1,973	4.87%	35,517	87.63%	40,529
Ward 2	28,714	86.59%	2,304	6.95%	2,143	6.46%	26,410	79.64%	33,161
Ward 3	36,475	85.66%	3,323	7.80%	2,784	6.54%	33,152	77.86%	42,582
Ward 4	37,962	92.60%	1,358	3.31%	1,677	4.09%	36,285	88.51%	40,997
Ward 5	37,021	92.72%	1,141	2.86%	1,766	4.42%	35,255	88.30%	39,928
Ward 6	45,540	88.11%	2,506	4.85%	3,641	7.04%	41,899	81.07%	51,687
Ward 7	31,784	95.47%	547	1.64%	961	2.89%	30,823	92.58%	33,292
Ward 8	27,844	95.71%	478	1.64%	770	2.65%	27,074	93.06%	29,092
Total	282,830	90.86%	12,723	4.09%	15,715	5.05%	267,115	85.81%	311,268

== See also ==
- 2016 Democratic Party presidential primaries
- 2016 Republican Party presidential primaries
