= Flamini =

Flamini or variations may refer to:

== People ==
- Flaminia gens, an ancient Roman family
- Gaius Flaminius (3rd century BC), politician and consul of the Roman Republic
- Anthony Flamini (born 1978), American comic book writer
- Mathieu Flamini (born 1984), French football player
- Manila Flamini (born 1987), Italian artistic swimmer
- Maurizio Flammini (born 29 November 1949) is an Italian former racing driver & World Superbike Championship creator
- Beatriz Flamini, a Spanish extreme athlete

== Other uses ==
- 18099 Flamini, a minor planet
- Circus Flaminius, area of land in Rome outfitted with a small racetrack in 221 BC
- Lancia Flaminia (1957–1970), an Italian luxury car
- MSC Flaminia, a German container ship
- Porta Flaminia, an earlier name of the Porta del Popolo gate in Rome
- Ptyongnathosia flaminia, a species of moth of the family Tortricidae
- Via Flaminia, an ancient Roman road
