= Briffault =

Briffault is a surname. Notable people with the surname include:

- Herma Briffault (1898–1981), American translator and ghostwriter
- Richard Briffault, American legal scholar
- Robert Briffault (1874–1948), French surgeon, social anthropologist, and novelist
