= Woman's Evolution =

- Author: Evelyn Reed
- Language: English
- Publisher: Pathfinder Press
- Publication date: 1975
- Media type: Print
- Pages: 629 pp.
- ISBN: 978-0-87348-422-0

Woman's Evolution: From Matriarchal Clan to Patriarchal Family is a 1975 book by the American revolutionary socialist Evelyn Reed. The book gives a Marxist view on the history of women and is considered to be a pioneer work of Marxist feminism. It has been translated into many languages.

In Woman's Evolution, Reed asks what anthropology can tell about social evolution. She concludes that social organization was created out of the mother-child relationship – initially as a matrilineal clan system, long before patriarchal families became the norm (p. xiii).

She focuses particularly on the earliest records of 'primitive' communities (with economies based on hunter-gathering or simple agriculture) (pp. 468, xviii). These communities used to be quite widespread up to the nineteenth century. They did not have any written language and Reed notes that within a very few years following contact with Europeans their social structure often changed substantially (p. 162). So she relies on the earliest anthropological records, drawing particularly on a review of such work by Robert Briffault published in 1927 (p. xv).

Her basic observation is that such communities were organised around a group of women together with their children. When the boys reached a certain age, usually in the range 6 to 10, they would be transferred to an associated group of men (p. 82). The men therefore would be the brothers of the women and maternal uncles of the children, but they would not be the biological fathers because of strict rules of exogamy enforced by traditions based on totem and taboo.

Reed notes there was a double taboo (pp. 23, 204). Sexual relations were not permitted within associated kin groups. But also men were not permitted to kill anyone within the same defined kin groups. Typically there was also a strong prohibition against men eating women's food and vice versa (pp. 71, 83, 91).

The systems of totem and taboo prevented cannibalism only within defined groups. However they did usually require men not to kill any woman, or often even any female animal (p. 280). Reed argues this was enforced by belief in women having superior magic – demonstrated by their ability to produce children (p. 108).

From a feminist perspective, the most important point to be drawn is that early human society was almost certainly organised along matrilineal lines with people tracing their kin ties through their mothers. Men were typically kept well away from child birth and may not even have known where babies come from (p. 340).

These communities could be described as matriarchal at least as far as children were concerned. Women did not control men so much other than excluding them from family life. Reed argues this was probably to protect women and children from male hunters, i.e. from cannibalism which she notes is found in fossil records throughout the Paleolithic era, though it died out with Homo sapiens (pp. 27–28).

Also important from a feminist perspective, in hunter-gatherer communities women gathered food for themselves and their children; men hunted food for themselves. Studies quoted by Reed show that in most areas the most reliable sources of food were not animal but vegetable (p. 106). In other words, the typical patriarchal claims that human society was founded on the skills of hunting are not credible.

The gendered division of food consumption as well as food gathering meant that men were relying on a completely different food source to that of women and children. It may be that the evolutionary advantage of the social organization of Homo sapiens was not that male hunting contributed to the family's food but rather that it allowed men not to compete for the family's food.

Reed argues there are no credible examples of communities moving from patriarchal to matrilineal, but many examples in history and mythology of moving from matrilineal to patriarchal – though the process is not well understood (p. 166).

Many of the matrilineal communities studied by early anthropologists changed very rapidly, allowing later anthropologists to believe that patriarchal or patrilineal relations were the norm. Thus was evidence of the original matriarchy written out of history almost before it was written in.

As Reed says, we should not see this matriarchy as a "lost paradise" (p. xviii). One obvious flaw with the early social structure based on totem and taboo was that it always required some people to be outside the favoured kin groups in order to provide sexual partners (pp. 319, 355, 381). When men started to cohabit with women as husbands they were divided between their responsibility in their own lineage for their sisters' sons and their responsibility for their wives' children. Reed speculates that this may have been the cause of widespread child sacrifices in many communities at the dawn of 'civilization' (pp. 403–4).

The transition from matrilineal to patriarchal is perhaps best shown in the Greek myth of Orestes (who killed his mother Clytemnestra in revenge for her killing his father Agamemnon, which was in revenge for Agamemnon sacrificing their daughter) (pp. 460–4). When Orestes is put on trial the key question, as related by Reed, is whether he is the flesh and blood of his mother, as in matrilineal custom, or the product of his father's seed as asserted in patriarchal custom. Luckily for Orestes, the judge is Athena, the goddess of wisdom, who has to accept that she herself was born without a mother (she was plucked out of Zeus's head) – thus proving the patriarchal assertion that a mother is not necessary. So Orestes was his father's flesh and blood and it was OK to kill his mother. On such impeccable logic was the patriarchal rule of law founded in Ancient Greece.
