= Cave sitting =

Test of endurance

Competitive cave sitting, or cave dwelling, began in the 1950s, as a test of endurance. Early cave sits involved groups of people, but over time the endeavour became an individual pursuit. Cave sitting requires a competitor to stay in a cave for as long as possible without direct interaction with other humans or the outside world. In addition to the desire to set a new record, the purpose of competitive cave sits have included testing the effects of solitude and darkness on humans, testing possible options for protection from nuclear fallout and studying the body's circadian rhythms. Since the 1950s, cave sitting endurance records have been set in France, America, Italy, Australia, England, Serbia and Spain. In the 1960s, sections of the press described cave sitting as a sport. The world record is currently held by Serbian Milutin Veljković who sat alone in a cave for 464 days in the Svrljig Mountains in eastern Serbia in 1971.

== History of cave sitting ==
=== 1950s ===
In 1956 nine French men spent two weeks in cave in Carennac "to see how air-crash victims might live off nature." In 1959 Americans Donald Martin, Jim Neawedde and Dave Mercer spent 12 days in Wayne Cave, Indianapolis, setting a national record.

=== 1960s ===
In 1961 ten Italian scientists spent a month in Caudano caves, Frabosa Sottana, researching possibilities for shelter against nuclear attacks. The following year Michel Siffre started "let's-see-how-long-we-can-stay-deep-down" individual challenges. His first stint was 62 days spent in Scarasson Cavern near Nice. In the same year Australian Bill Penman spent 63 days in a cave in Katherine, Northern Territory. In addition to a desire to break Siffre's record from earlier that year, Penman wanted to "prove humanity can return to the caves if nuclear war makes the Earth's surface unhabitable." The following year, Australian Wyndham Rendall spent 87 days in Ngilgi Cave, Western Australia. This was followed immediately by fellow Australian Dorothy Williams, who spent 90 days also in Ngilgi, becoming the first woman to set a lone cave-sitting record. Soon after, Englishman Jeffrey Workman spent 105 days in Stump Cross Caverns, Yorkshire.

In 1964 Frenchwoman Josie Laures spent 88 days in a cave in the French Alps, in an experiment organised by Siffre. The intention was to "study the effects of long isolation which space travellers would undergo." She finished the experiment two days early due to "intense fatigue." In the same year Frenchman Antoine Sennie spent 126 days in Olivier Cavern, Grasse. He called himself a "speleonaut". In 1966 Englishman David Lafferty spent 127 days in Gough's Cave, Cheddar Caves, Somerset. The owner of the caves, Lord Weymouth, offered Lafferty £1,000 for the first 100 days, with £10 for every day after that. Following Lafferty's new record several French potholers, with the support of the French Defence Ministry, attempted to break it. Jean-Pierre Mairetet succeeded by spending 181 days in Olivier Cavern. Two French men spent five months in a cave in Nice in 1969 as part of another experiment organised by Siffre.

=== 1970s ===
Between 1970 and 1971 Serbian Milutin Veljković spent 464 days (15 months) in a cave in the Svrljig Mountains. This set a world record that still stands in 2025, although the feat remained largely unknown outside Serbia until the 1990s. The following year Siffre spent six months in Midnight Cave, Del Rio, Texas, "searching for an elusive 48-hour day." About this search he said, "We must find the mechanism of the 48-hour rhythm. If we do, we may develop new data on sleep and how it is possible to create good sleep which gives good restorative powers." As a result of his experiment "it became clear that Siffre's sleep patterns had settled into a cycle that ran close to twenty-five hours."

=== 1980s ===
In 1987 Italian Maurizio Montalbini spent 210 days in a cave in Apennine Mountains, Ancona. It was reported as setting a new "record for cave dwelling in isolation" (but this was incorrect, Veljković having spent more than 250 days longer in isolation in 1971). Stefania Follini spent 130 days in a cave in Carlsbad, New Mexico, in 1989 setting a new world record for the longest cave sit by a woman. The intention of the experiment was to "learn how people may experience the long solitude of interplanetary travel."

=== 1990s ===
In 1994 American Robert "Mountain Bob" Leasure spent 227 days in cave in Cañon City, Colorado, believing he had set a new world record. After emerging, however, he learned about Velković's 464-day record, about which he said, "I think it's pretty dirty poker." Leasure had been working from Montalbini's 1987 210-day record, which had been incorrectly reported as a world record in the 1988 publication of Guinness World Records, the only time that the category was included in the book. At the time of the 1988 edition, Guinness were unaware of Veljković's 464-day sit from 1971. Leasure had contacted Guinness in 1994, a few months before his sit, hoping to confirm what was needed to break the cave-sitting record, about which he said, "We contacted them. They told us that the lady in Italy did 210 days." (Note: Montalbini was a man) Of his failed attempt, Leasure commented that he "thought he had done everything he could to research it."

=== 2000 onwards ===
Spaniard Beatriz Flamini spent 500 days in a cave in Granada, southern Spain from November 2021 to April 2023. Her experience was observed by scientists interested in the "impact of social isolation and extreme temporary disorientation on perception of time." She did not beat record Veljković's 464-day record, however, as she had to leave the cave after approximately 300 days to spend eight days in a tent because of a "technical problem".

== The impacts of cave sitting ==
In 1962, Penman found that he had gone temporarily blind for the final three days of his 64-day cave sit, as a result of "the glare of a carbide lamp." Of his 464-day sit, Velković said, "I miss girls more than anything else". He also reported "intense feelings of monotony punctuated by infrequent hallucinations." In 1975, three years after his six-month stay in Midnight Cave, Siffre recounted that the ill effects continued to affect him. He reported in National Geographic "I am convinced that final results of this [Midnight Cave] experiment will reveal serious problems confronting future long-range space travellers." "Despite a high-calorie diet of powdered food and pills", Montalbini lost about 29 pounds during his 1987 cave sit. In 1989, Follini's menstrual cycle stopped after 130 days. During his entire time spent in a cave, Leasure did not "have a cold, or take an aspirin." 300 days into her cave sit in 2022, Flamini began to experience "inaudible sonic waves" which she thought was to do with her emergency communication equipment.

== Discoveries ==
Discoveries made during cave sits included:

- In 1962, Penman discovered fossils of an eyeless shrimp
- In 1963, Williams discovered the skeleton of a seven-foot-tall megafauna kangaroo, a Tasmanian tiger and several other "rare marsupials" which were not known to have existed in Western Australia until that point

== Other reading ==
- Orlock, Carol (1995). Know your body clock: Discover your body's inner cycles and rhythms. New York, USA: Carol Pub. Group. ISBN 9780806517032.
