= Empirical research =

Scientific inquiry based on observation or experimental procedure

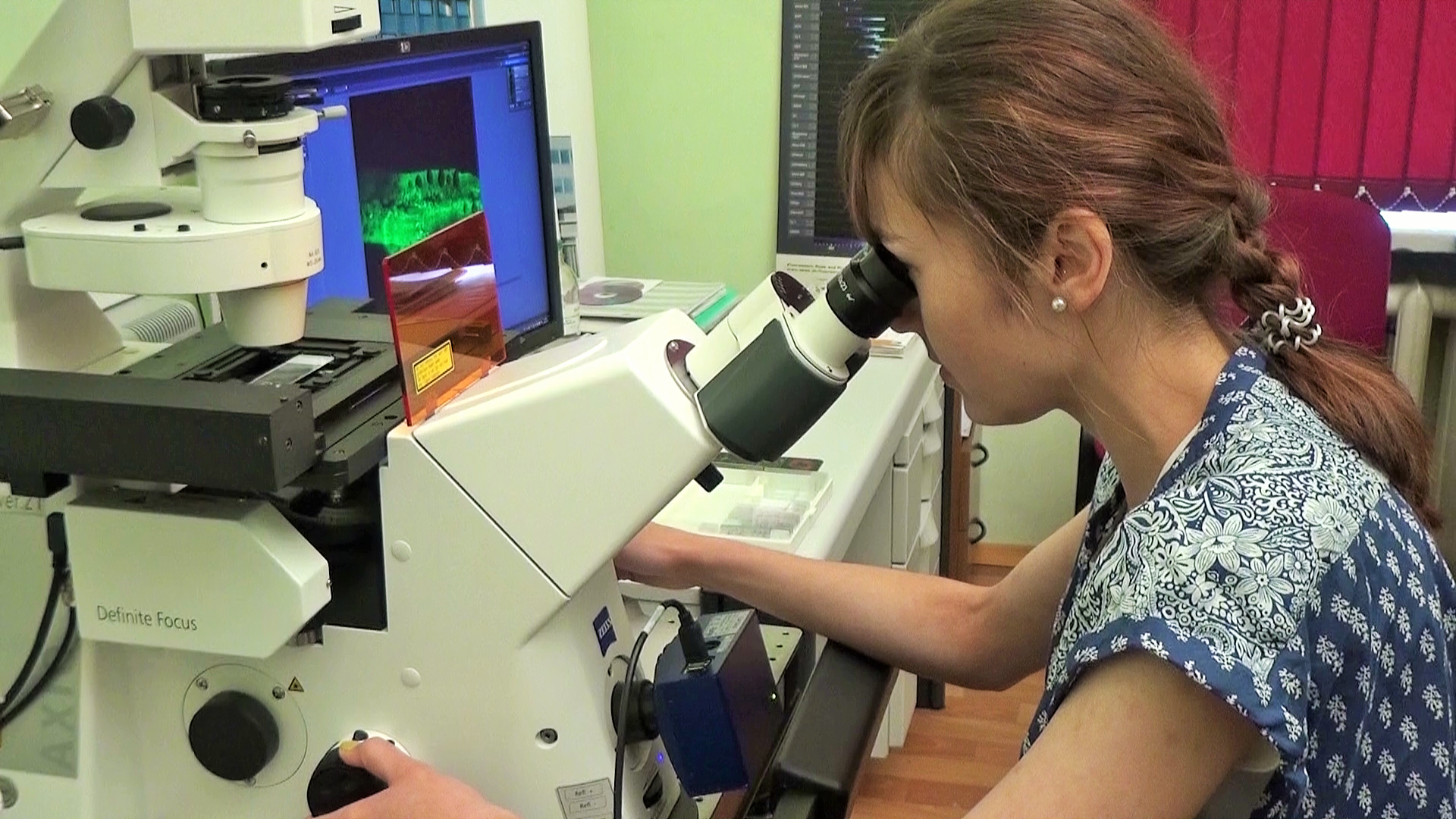
A scientist gathering data for her research

Empirical research is research using empirical evidence. It is also a way of gaining knowledge by means of direct and indirect observation or experience. Empiricism values some research more than other kinds. Empirical evidence (the record of one's direct observations or experiences) can be analyzed quantitatively or qualitatively. By quantifying the evidence or making sense of it in qualitative form, a researcher can answer empirical questions, which should be clearly defined and answerable with the evidence collected (usually called data). Research design varies by field and by the question being investigated. Many researchers combine qualitative and quantitative forms of analysis to better answer questions that cannot be studied in laboratory settings, particularly in the social sciences and in education.

In some fields, quantitative research may begin with a research question (e.g., "Does listening to vocal music during the learning of a word list have an effect on later memory for these words?") which is tested through experimentation. Usually, the researcher has a certain theory regarding the topic under investigation. Based on this theory, statements or hypotheses will be proposed (e.g., "Listening to vocal music has a negative effect on learning a word list."). From these hypotheses, predictions about specific events are derived (e.g., "People who study a word list while listening to vocal music will remember fewer words on a later memory test than people who study a word list in silence."). These predictions can then be tested with a suitable experiment. Depending on the outcomes of the experiment, the theory on which the hypotheses and predictions were based will be supported or not, or may need to be modified and then subjected to further testing.

== History ==
The experimental method has evolved over the ages, with many scientists contributing to its foundation and development. In ancient times, Greek philosophers, such as Aristotle, relied on observation and rational inference in their studies. Aristotle rejected exclusive reliance on logical deduction, emphasizing the importance of observation in understanding nature.

According to Michael Ben-Chaim, while natural philosophers have always paid attention to experience and empirical evidence, modern science places a much greater emphasis on the process of empirical research. He attributes the beginning of this change to the ideas and work of Robert Boyle, Isaac Newton and John Locke, who challenged the traditional notion of scientific causal explanation that was prevalent among natural philosophers. In contrast to natural philosophers, who were seeking to use empirical evidence to define the nature (essence) of things, they instead established a new mode of scientific explanation that aimed at understanding how different empirical properties are correlated. This has made the process of experimentation crucial to the very practice of scientific explanation (for it was the experiment itself that provided an explanation for the correlation of empirical properties) and has led, through gradual institutional change, to the establishment of the modern culture of empirical research.

During the Middle Ages, scientists in the Muslim world advanced the experimental method. Jabir ibn Hayyan, sometimes called the father of chemistry, introduced experimental methodology into chemistry and developed chemical processes such as crystallization, calcination, and distillation. He is also credited with discovering acids such as sulfuric and nitric acid, which expanded the possibilities of chemical experiments. The optics scientist Alhazen (Ibn al-Haytham) was among the first to rely on experimentation in studying light and vision. In his Book of Optics, he employed a scientific method based on observation, experimentation, and mathematical proof, and he is often regarded as a pioneer of the modern scientific method.

These scientific approaches were transmitted to Europe through translations, influencing the development of modern scientific methodology. European scientists, such as Francis Bacon, were inspired by the works of Muslim scholars in refining the experimental method. The researcher Robert Briffault, in his book Making of Humanity, states:

"It was under their successors at Oxford School (that is, successors to the Muslims of Spain) that Roger Bacon learned Arabic and Arabic Sciences. Neither Roger Bacon nor later namesake has any title to be credited with having introduced the experimental method. Roger Bacon was no more than one of apostles of Muslim Science and Method to Christian Europe".

== Terminology ==
The term empirical was originally used to refer to certain ancient Greek practitioners of medicine who rejected adherence to the dogmatic doctrines of the day, preferring instead to rely on the observation of phenomena as perceived in experience. Later empiricism referred to a theory of knowledge in philosophy which adheres to the principle that knowledge arises from experience and evidence gathered specifically using the senses. In scientific use, the term empirical refers to the gathering of data using only evidence that is observable by the senses or in some cases using calibrated scientific instruments. What early philosophers described as empiricist and empirical research have in common is the dependence on observable data to formulate and test theories and come to conclusions.

== Usage ==
The researcher attempts to describe accurately the interaction between the instrument (or the human senses) and the entity being observed. If instrumentation is involved, the researcher is expected to calibrate the instrument by applying it to known standard objects and documenting the results before applying it to unknown objects.

In practice, the accumulation of evidence for or against any particular theory involves planned research designs for the collection of empirical data, and academic rigor plays a large part in judging the merits of research design. Several typologies for such designs have been suggested, one of the most popular of which comes from Campbell and Stanley. They popularized the widely cited distinction among pre-experimental, experimental, and quasi-experimental designs and advocated the central role of randomized experiments in educational research.

=== Scientific research ===
Accurate analysis of data using standardized statistical methods in scientific studies is critical to determining the validity of empirical research. Statistical formulas such as regression, uncertainty coefficient, t-test, chi square, and various types of ANOVA (analyses of variance) are fundamental to forming logical, valid conclusions. If empirical data reach significance under the appropriate statistical formula, the research hypothesis is supported. If not, the null hypothesis is supported (or, more accurately, not rejected), meaning no effect of the independent variable(s) was observed on the dependent variable(s).

The result of empirical research using statistical hypothesis testing is never proof. It can only support a hypothesis, reject it, or do neither. These methods yield only probabilities. Among scientific researchers, empirical evidence (as distinct from empirical research) refers to objective evidence that appears the same regardless of the observer. For example, a thermometer will not display different temperatures for each individual who observes it. Temperature, as measured by an accurate, well calibrated thermometer, is empirical evidence. By contrast, non-empirical evidence is subjective, depending on the observer. Following the previous example, observer A might truthfully report that a room is warm, while observer B might truthfully report that the same room is cool, though both observe the same reading on the thermometer. The use of empirical evidence negates this effect of personal (i.e., subjective) experience or time.

Empiricism and rationalism differ in the extent to which they consider knowledge to depend on sense experience. According to rationalism, some knowledge and concepts are gained independently of sense experience. According to empiricism, sense experience is the main source of all knowledge and concepts. In general, rationalists develop their views in two ways. First, they argue that there are cases in which the content of knowledge or concepts outstrips the information provided by sense experience (Hjørland, 2010, 2). Second, they construct accounts of how reasoning provides additional knowledge about a specific or broader scope. Empiricists present complementary lines of thought.

First, empiricists develop accounts of how experience provides the information that rationalists cite, insofar as that information exists in the first place. At times, empiricists opt for skepticism as an alternative to rationalism: if experience cannot provide the knowledge or concepts cited by rationalists, then they do not exist (Pearce, 2010, 35). Second, empiricists tend to attack rationalists' accounts of reasoning as an important source of knowledge or concepts.

The overall disagreement between empiricists and rationalists concerns how knowledge is gained, with respect to the sources of knowledge and concepts. In some cases, disagreement on this point leads to conflicting positions on other matters as well, such as the nature of warrant and the limits of knowledge and thought. Empiricists share the view that there is no innate knowledge and that knowledge is instead derived from experience. These experiences are either reasoned using the mind or sensed through the five human senses (Bernard, 2011, 5). Rationalists, on the other hand, share the view that innate knowledge exists, although they differ on which objects of innate knowledge they choose.

To follow rationalism, one must adopt one of three claims: deduction or intuition, innate knowledge, or innate concepts. The further a concept is removed from mental operations and experience, the more plausibly it can be claimed to be innate. Empiricism with respect to a specific subject rejects the corresponding versions of innate knowledge and of deduction or intuition (Weiskopf, 2008, 16). Insofar as concepts and knowledge within that subject area are acknowledged, knowledge is held to depend largely on experience through the human senses.

== Empirical cycle ==
Empirical cycle according to A.D. de Groot

A.D. de Groot's empirical cycle:

1. Observation: The observation of a phenomenon and inquiry concerning its causes.
2. Induction: The formulation of hypotheses - generalized explanations for the phenomenon.
3. Deduction: The formulation of experiments that will test the hypotheses (i.e. confirm them if true, refute them if false).
4. Testing: The procedures by which the hypotheses are tested and data are collected.
5. Evaluation: The interpretation of the data and the formulation of a theory - an abductive argument that presents the results of the experiment as the most reasonable explanation for the phenomenon.

== See also ==
- Case study
- Fact
- Field research
- Scientific method
