= Beatriz Flamini =

Spanish extreme athlete and mountaineer

Beatriz Flamini is a Spanish extreme athlete and mountaineer known for her acts of self-isolation and self-sufficiency. She is best known for her "Timecave" expedition, whereby she spent 500 days living in a cave in Granada, from November 2021 to April 2023.

== Biography ==
=== Early career ===
Flamini studied to be a sports instructor, and was employed as an aerobics teacher in Madrid. In the 1990s, she joined cave exploring expeditions as a photographer. She later moved to a mountain refuge in the Sierra de Gredos to be a rescue worker. In 2019, she was making preparations to cross Mongolia by foot. She moved to Espigüete and began training at Montaña Palentina. She later decided that she was physically capable of the task, but was not mentally prepared for the prolonged isolation.

=== Timecave ===
To prepare for the social isolation in the Mongolian desert, Flamini intended to beat the record of 463 days spent in an underground cave set by Milutin Veljković. Flamini planned to be more strict with her seclusion than Veljković, wishing to completely disconnect from human interaction. She picked a cave north of Motril in Granada. The cave was 230 feet (70 m) deep, and the main chamber measured 3,000 square feet (280 m^{2}) and had 40 feet (12 m) tall ceilings. The expedition became known as "Timecave".

On November 21, 2021, Flamini entered the cave at the age of 48. Her time was spent recreationally exercising, drawing, reading, and knitting. She was conscious about maintaining the natural silence of the cave and limited how much she spoke aloud. Flamini had the ability to send messages above ground, but not to receive them. She was supported by a group of volunteers, who removed waste, provided food, and maintained her equipment. Provisions were dead dropped halfway down the cave to limit interaction between support staff and Flamini.

Her experiences were monitored by scientists, including chronobiologists at several Spanish universities. A Spanish production company, Dokumalia, was also invited to film the endeavor both for scientific purposes, and possibly make a documentary about Timecave. One month into the stay, Flamini revoked her consent to using any of the data she was supplying for scientific or documentary purposes. As of January 2024, Flamini still withheld the data from both teams.

In September 2022, approximately 300 days into her isolation, Flamini began experiencing intense discomfort. She claimed this was due to "inaudible sonic waves" emitted by her emergency communication equipment. She moved her sleeping tent to the exit of the cave. She had a brief face-to-face discussion with a member of her team, ending her streak of seclusion. Her six days spent at the exit of the cave disqualified her from beating the record set by Veljković.

Flamini emerged from the cave on April 14, 2023. In a press conference immediately after her exit, she stated that she enjoyed her tenure in the cave, and claimed she could have remained isolated for a further 500 days. Some have expressed doubts regarding how positive the stay was for Flamini. The video footage collected during her stay appeared to show her in distress at times, experiencing anxiety, hallucinations, and later requesting music to help her mental health despite her initial objections. On her exit, she had lost 12 lbs, walked in a stooped gait, had issues recovering her balance, and had lost much of her peripheral vision. A neuropsychologist who had evaluated her condition at the end of Timecave suggested she might be expriencing PTSD.

== See also ==
- Maurizio Montalbini (1953–2009), Italian caver who had lived in complete isolation in an underground chamber multiple times since 1986
- Stefania Follini (born 1961), Italian woman who spent 130 days in a cave, breaking the women's world record for longest cave isolation in 1989
- Michel Siffre (1939–2024), French caver who ran experiments on perception of time while isolated in caves
- Milutin Veljković (1935-2011), Serbian speleologist best known for holding the Guinness World Record for longest consecutive time spent underground since 1970.
