= Stefania Follini =

Italian interior designer

- Born: August 16, 1961 (age 64)
- Occupation: Interior designer
- Known for: Spending 130 days in isolation in a cave for an experiment on circadian rhythms

Stefania Follini (born 16 August 1961) is an Italian interior designer. She is known for being involved in a 1989 experiment on circadian rhythms, in which she voluntarily isolated herself for four months in an underground room thirty feet down a cave in Carlsbad, New Mexico, away from all outside indications of night and day. The experiment lasted from January 13, 1989, until May 22, 1989. In total, Follini spent some 130 days in the cave, thus breaking the women's world record for longest cave isolation.

== Career ==
Hailing from Ancona, Italy, Follini worked as an interior decorator. Out of 20 candidates, Follini was chosen for the experiment because she possessed an "introspective nature" and "mental discipline". At that time, she was 27 years old.

=== Experiment ===
The scientific experiment commenced on January 13, 1989. It was organised by Pioneer Frontier Explorations and NASA. It took place in the "Lost Cave" in New Mexico. Inside her 20-by-12-foot (6.1 by 3.7 m) acrylic glass room, away from all cues to the normal 24-hour daily cycle, her biological clock drifted away from its regular rhythm to following first a 28-hour day, and later on a 48-hour one. She started staying awake for up to more than twenty hours and sleeping up to ten hours at a time. Her only companions were her guitar, a computer, two "friendly mice" named Giuseppe and Nicoletta, a few frogs, and grasshoppers. During the course of the experiment, she was reported to have felt gloomy, with no human to cheer her. Her only mode of communication was via the computer terminals. To curb her boredom, Follini would decorate the cave with cutouts made from cardboard.

With her slowed-down daily cycle, her meals were more spread out and she lost 17 pounds (7.7 kg) in weight. Follini mostly fed on beans and rice, which partially resulted in her losing vitamin D. She reported that at one point her menstrual cycle had stopped. She regularly did judo to maintain her strength and flexibility. When she finally emerged from the cave at the experiment's end on May 22, 1989, and was asked to guess the date, she estimated that it was March 14 or 15 — only two months from the start of the experiment instead of the four that had actually transpired. She was described as "looking pale and thin" after coming out from the cave. Having spent about 130 days in the cave, she broke the world record for women for the most number of days spent in isolation in a cave.

== See also ==
- Beatriz Flamini
- Maurizio Montalbini
- Michel Siffre
