= 1972 United States presidential election in New York =

- November 7, 1972

Nominee	Richard Nixon	George McGovern
Party	Republican	Democratic
Alliance	Conservative	Liberal
Home state	California	South Dakota
Running mate	Spiro Agnew	Sargent Shriver
Electoral vote	41	0
Popular vote	4,192,778	2,951,084
Percentage	58.54%	41.21%

Nixon
50–60%
60–70%
70–80%
McGovern
50–60%
60–70%
70–80%
80–90%
President before election
Richard Nixon
Republican
Elected President
Richard Nixon
Republican

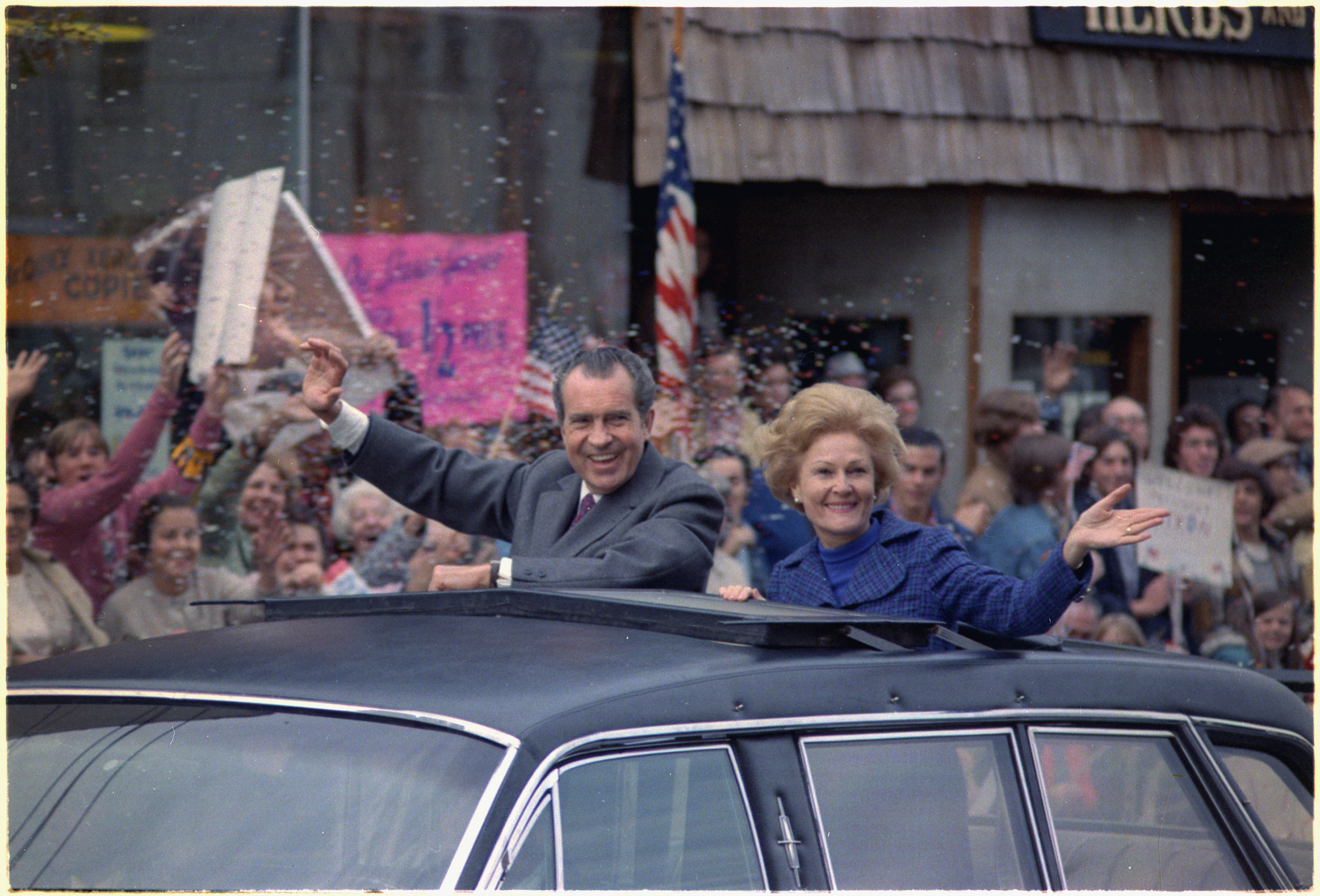
Nixon while campaigning in Pocantico Hills, New York, 1972.

The 1972 United States presidential election in New York took place on November 7, 1972. All 50 states and the District of Columbia, were part of the 1972 United States presidential election. Voters chose 41 electors to the Electoral College, which voted for President and Vice President.

New York was won by incumbent Republican President Richard Nixon, who succeeded in securing re-election against Democratic Senator George McGovern of South Dakota. Nixon ran with Vice President, and former Maryland Governor, Spiro Agnew for vice president, and McGovern ran with United States Ambassador Sargent Shriver for vice president. In the midst of a nationwide Republican landslide, Nixon took 58.54% of the vote in New York State to McGovern's 41.21%, a margin of 17.34%. New York weighed in for this election as more Democratic than the national average by about 6%.

Nearly all counties in New York State turned out for Nixon, and only the New York City boroughs of Manhattan, Brooklyn and the Bronx voted for McGovern. McGovern was able to win New York City overall with his victories in these three boroughs, taking two-thirds of the vote in Manhattan and also winning majority votes in Brooklyn and the Bronx. However, Nixon was able to put in a relatively strong performance citywide, winning 56% of the vote in Queens and 74% of the vote in Staten Island. 1972 remains the last election in which a Republican presidential nominee has won any New York City borough other than Staten Island, Queens being a heavily populated county that was historically key to Republican competition in New York. This was also the last election in which a Republican presidential nominee has won the upstate counties of Erie County, where the city of Buffalo is located, and Albany County, where the state capital of Albany is located, as well as in turn, the last Republican to win every county of upstate New York. Both of these counties have become solidly Democratic in the years that have followed.

The presidential election of 1972 was an extremely partisan election for New York, with 99.75% of the electorate voting either Republican or Democrat. Having delivered as President a period of relative economic stability and growth, and showing promising movements towards peace in Vietnam, Nixon was able to gain reelection with electors from every State in the U.S., except Massachusetts and the District of Columbia. The Vietnam War continued to be a strong issue during this election, with both candidates declaring desire to end the conflict.

This was the first election since 1808 in which New York did not have the largest number of electors in the Electoral College, having fallen to 41 electors versus California's 45 as a result of the 1970 census. It is also the only presidential election from 1952 onwards in which New York did not vote the same way as Massachusetts. As of the 2024 U.S. presidential election, this is the last time that New York state voted more Republican than Michigan, Wisconsin, and South Dakota, and the last time that Queens voted Republican in a presidential election.

== Campaign ==
The number of votes cast on the Liberal Party of New York's ballot line declined by almost 60%.

1972 Liberal Party state committee presidential vote
Party	Candidate	Votes	%	±%
Liberal	George McGovern	215	96.41%	
Liberal	Benjamin Spock	8	3.59%	
Total votes		223	100.00%	

== Results ==
1972 United States presidential election in New York
Party	Candidate	Votes	Percentage	Electoral votes
Republican	Richard Nixon	3,824,642	53.40%	
Conservative	Richard Nixon	368,136	5.14%	
Total	Richard Nixon (incumbent)	4,192,778	58.54%	41
Democratic	George McGovern	2,767,956	38.65%	
Liberal	George McGovern	183,128	2.56%	
Total	George McGovern	2,951,084	41.21%	0
Socialist Workers	Evelyn Reed	7,797	0.11%	0
Communist	Gus Hall	5,641	0.08%	0
Socialist Labor	Louis Fisher	4,530	0.06%	0
Totals		7,161,830	100.0%	41

=== New York City results ===
Results by borough for the 1972 US presidential election in New York City.

1972 presidential election in New York City		Manhattan	The Bronx	Brooklyn	Queens	Staten Island	Total	
Democratic- Liberal	George McGovern	354,326	243,345	387,768	328,316	29,241	1,342,996	51.46%
Democratic- Liberal	George McGovern	66.25%	55.16%	50.78%	43.42%	25.62%	1,342,996	51.46%
Republican- Conservative	Richard Nixon	178,515	196,754	373,903	426,015	84,686	1,259,873	48.27%
Republican- Conservative	Richard Nixon	33.38%	44.60%	48.96%	56.34%	74.21%	1,259,873	48.27%
Communist	Gus Hall	938	458	797	628	71	2,892	0.11%
Communist	Gus Hall	0.18%	0.10%	0.10%	0.08%	0.06%	2,892	0.11%
Socialist Workers	Evelyn Reed	702	355	672	674	84	2,487	0.10%
Socialist Workers	Evelyn Reed	0.13%	0.08%	0.09%	0.09%	0.07%	2,487	0.10%
Socialist Labor	Louis Fisher	382	262	480	454	41	1,619	0.06%
Socialist Labor	Louis Fisher	0.07%	0.06%	0.06%	0.06%	0.04%	1,619	0.06%
TOTAL		534,863	441,174	763,620	756,087	114,123	2,609,867	100.00%

=== Results by county ===
County	Richard Nixon Republican/Conservative		George McGovern Democratic/Liberal		Evelyn Reed Socialist Workers		Gus Hall Communist		Louis Fisher Socialist Labor		Margin		Total votes cast
County	#	%	#	%	#	%	#	%	#	%	#	%	Total votes cast
Albany	81,848	54.76%	67,297	45.02%	158	0.11%	85	0.06%	87	0.06%	14,551	9.74%	149,475
Allegany	13,426	73.43%	4,812	26.32%	28	0.15%	9	0.05%	9	0.05%	8,614	47.11%	18,284
Bronx	196,754	44.60%	243,345	55.16%	355	0.08%	458	0.10%	262	0.06%	−46,591	−10.56%	441,174
Broome	55,736	59.84%	37,154	39.89%	132	0.14%	49	0.05%	64	0.07%	18,582	19.95%	93,135
Cattaraugus	21,906	66.53%	10,909	33.13%	66	0.20%	21	0.06%	25	0.08%	10,997	33.40%	32,927
Cayuga	22,774	67.08%	11,097	32.68%	34	0.10%	11	0.03%	36	0.11%	11,677	34.40%	33,952
Chautauqua	37,158	58.44%	26,253	41.29%	77	0.12%	39	0.06%	56	0.09%	10,905	17.15%	63,583
Chemung	26,200	67.28%	12,650	32.48%	50	0.13%	16	0.04%	28	0.07%	13,550	34.80%	38,944
Chenango	13,770	70.58%	5,695	29.19%	28	0.14%	5	0.03%	11	0.06%	8,075	41.39%	19,509
Clinton	17,048	63.60%	9,703	36.20%	31	0.12%	10	0.04%	12	0.04%	7,345	27.40%	26,804
Columbia	17,995	70.27%	7,558	29.51%	26	0.10%	12	0.05%	19	0.07%	10,437	40.76%	25,610
Cortland	12,885	70.97%	5,234	28.83%	20	0.11%	10	0.06%	7	0.04%	7,651	42.14%	18,156
Delaware	15,136	74.10%	5,243	25.67%	27	0.13%	10	0.05%	10	0.05%	9,893	48.43%	20,426
Dutchess	64,864	69.82%	27,872	30.00%	79	0.09%	38	0.04%	50	0.05%	36,992	39.82%	92,903
Erie	256,462	53.88%	218,105	45.82%	568	0.12%	377	0.08%	511	0.11%	38,357	8.06%	476,023
Essex	11,763	70.22%	4,955	29.58%	14	0.08%	13	0.08%	7	0.04%	6,808	40.64%	16,752
Franklin	10,959	67.40%	5,266	32.39%	20	0.12%	3	0.02%	12	0.07%	5,693	35.01%	16,260
Fulton	15,200	67.33%	7,303	32.35%	28	0.12%	16	0.07%	28	0.12%	7,897	34.98%	22,575
Genesee	17,107	66.28%	8,631	33.44%	41	0.16%	11	0.04%	21	0.08%	8,476	32.84%	25,811
Greene	14,313	72.96%	5,260	26.81%	28	0.14%	10	0.05%	7	0.04%	9,053	46.15%	19,618
Hamilton	2,597	77.89%	731	21.93%	1	0.03%	1	0.03%	4	0.12%	1,866	55.96%	3,334
Herkimer	20,194	67.84%	9,487	31.87%	46	0.15%	23	0.08%	17	0.06%	10,707	35.97%	29,767
Jefferson	23,123	66.41%	11,629	33.40%	31	0.09%	15	0.04%	19	0.05%	11,494	33.01%	34,817
Kings	373,903	48.96%	387,768	50.78%	672	0.09%	797	0.10%	480	0.06%	−13,865	−1.82%	763,620
Lewis	6,591	68.60%	2,987	31.09%	14	0.15%	6	0.06%	10	0.10%	3,604	37.51%	9,608
Livingston	15,886	69.13%	7,031	30.60%	31	0.13%	15	0.07%	17	0.07%	8,855	38.53%	22,980
Madison	18,392	74.47%	6,241	25.27%	32	0.13%	14	0.06%	18	0.07%	12,151	49.20%	24,697
Monroe	196,579	61.95%	120,031	37.83%	358	0.11%	162	0.05%	175	0.06%	76,548	24.12%	317,305
Montgomery	16,640	63.58%	9,460	36.15%	44	0.17%	11	0.04%	16	0.06%	7,180	27.43%	26,171
Nassau	438,723	63.31%	252,831	36.48%	723	0.10%	418	0.06%	332	0.05%	185,892	26.83%	693,027
New York	178,515	33.38%	354,326	66.25%	702	0.13%	938	0.18%	382	0.07%	−175,811	−32.87%	534,863
Niagara	54,777	58.22%	38,991	41.44%	156	0.17%	90	0.10%	77	0.08%	15,786	16.78%	94,091
Oneida	78,549	69.86%	33,642	29.92%	135	0.12%	54	0.05%	64	0.06%	44,907	39.94%	112,444
Onondaga	140,039	69.18%	61,895	30.58%	231	0.11%	105	0.05%	146	0.07%	78,144	38.60%	202,416
Ontario	23,828	68.23%	11,012	31.53%	42	0.12%	22	0.06%	17	0.05%	12,816	36.70%	34,921
Orange	63,556	71.00%	25,778	28.80%	92	0.10%	36	0.04%	53	0.06%	37,778	42.20%	89,515
Orleans	10,938	71.35%	4,371	28.51%	13	0.08%	3	0.02%	4	0.03%	6,567	42.84%	15,329
Oswego	29,109	71.84%	11,317	27.93%	44	0.11%	16	0.04%	32	0.08%	17,792	43.91%	40,518
Otsego	17,364	68.58%	7,898	31.19%	33	0.13%	11	0.04%	15	0.06%	9,466	37.39%	25,321
Putnam	21,673	73.48%	7,747	26.26%	32	0.11%	23	0.08%	22	0.07%	13,926	47.22%	29,497
Queens	426,015	56.34%	328,316	43.42%	674	0.09%	628	0.08%	454	0.06%	97,699	12.92%	756,087
Rensselaer	48,864	66.87%	24,019	32.87%	79	0.11%	54	0.07%	55	0.08%	24,845	34.00%	73,071
Richmond	84,686	74.21%	29,241	25.62%	84	0.07%	71	0.06%	41	0.04%	55,445	48.59%	114,123
Rockland	64,753	64.29%	35,771	35.52%	73	0.07%	54	0.05%	69	0.07%	28,982	28.77%	100,720
St. Lawrence	26,145	63.00%	15,286	36.83%	77	0.13%	35	0.06%	38	0.06%	10,859	26.17%	41,503
Saratoga	40,582	69.22%	17,899	30.53%	98	0.13%	42	0.05%	51	0.07%	22,683	38.69%	58,631
Schenectady	47,529	61.46%	29,619	38.30%	15	0.12%	16	0.13%	1	0.01%	17,910	23.16%	77,339
Schoharie	8,644	69.68%	3,730	30.07%	5	0.07%	1	0.01%	3	0.04%	4,914	39.61%	12,406
Schuyler	4,945	71.76%	1,937	28.11%	18	0.13%	5	0.04%	10	0.07%	3,008	43.65%	6,891
Seneca	9,368	67.68%	4,441	32.08%	44	0.11%	10	0.02%	18	0.04%	4,927	35.60%	13,842
Steuben	28,708	75.05%	9,462	24.74%	39	0.10%	17	0.04%	27	0.07%	19,246	50.31%	38,253
Suffolk	316,452	70.34%	132,441	29.44%	505	0.11%	273	0.06%	227	0.05%	184,011	40.90%	449,898
Sullivan	17,035	63.24%	9,847	36.55%	30	0.11%	15	0.06%	11	0.04%	7,188	26.69%	26,938
Tioga	13,396	70.84%	5,470	28.93%	29	0.15%	5	0.03%	10	0.05%	7,926	41.91%	18,910
Tompkins	17,605	58.66%	12,344	41.13%	32	0.11%	16	0.05%	14	0.05%	5,261	17.53%	30,011
Ulster	46,883	68.51%	21,371	31.23%	81	0.12%	45	0.07%	53	0.08%	25,512	37.28%	68,433
Warren	16,649	74.11%	5,760	25.64%	33	0.15%	6	0.03%	17	0.08%	10,889	48.47%	22,465
Washington	16,136	73.80%	5,677	25.97%	24	0.11%	8	0.04%	19	0.09%	10,459	47.83%	21,864
Wayne	23,379	73.89%	8,203	25.92%	34	0.11%	19	0.06%	7	0.02%	15,176	47.97%	31,642
Westchester	262,901	62.83%	154,412	36.90%	548	0.13%	345	0.08%	229	0.05%	108,489	25.93%	418,435
Wyoming	11,184	71.75%	4,365	28.00%	22	0.14%	9	0.06%	8	0.05%	6,819	43.75%	15,588
Yates	6,639	77.04%	1,958	22.72%	11	0.13%	4	0.05%	6	0.07%	4,681	54.32%	8,618
Totals	4,192,778	58.54%	2,951,084	41.21%	7,797	0.11%	5,641	0.08%	4,530	0.06%	1,241,694	17.33%	7,161,830

=== Results by congressional district ===
This table shows the results by congressional district in New York.

District	Nixon	McGovern
1st	70.4%	29.6%
2nd	72.5%	27.5%
3rd	66.7%	33.3%
4th	64%	36%
5th	62.5%	37.5%
6th	62.3%	37.7%
7th	41.4%	58.6%
8th	49.7%	50.3%
9th	73.4%	26.6%
10th	63.1%	36.9%
11th	51.8%	48.2%
12th	15.6%	84.4%
13th	48.6%	51.4%
14th	47.8%	52.2%
15th	67.7%	32.3%
16th	46.2%	53.8%
17th	62%	38%
18th	41.9%	58.1%
19th	18.6%	81.4%
20th	34.4%	65.6%
21st	20.5%	79.5%
22nd	39.9%	60.1%
23rd	60.4%	39.6%
24th	60.9%	39.1%
25th	70%	30%
26th	67.8%	32.2%
27th	63.6%	36.4%
28th	57%	43%
29th	69.9%	30.1%
30th	67%	33%
31st	69.7%	30.3%
32nd	69.7%	30.3%
33rd	69.6%	30.4%
34th	62.7%	37.3%
35th	65.7%	34.3%
36th	60.2%	39.8%
37th	43%	57%
38th	60.8%	39.2%
39th	66.2%	33.8%

== See also ==
- United States presidential elections in New York
- George McGovern 1972 presidential campaign
- Presidency of Richard Nixon
- Presidency of Gerald Ford
- Watergate scandal

== Works cited ==
- Soyer, Daniel (2021). Left in the Center: The Liberal Party of New York and the Rise and Fall of American Social Democracy. Cornell University Press. ISBN 9781501759888. JSTOR 10.7591/j.ctv1hw3x50.2.
