= Ptyongnathosia cotopaxiana =

Scientific classification
- Domain: Eukaryota
- Kingdom: Animalia
- Phylum: Arthropoda
- Class: Insecta
- Order: Lepidoptera
- Family: Tortricidae
- Genus: Ptyongnathosia
- Species: P. cotopaxiana

Binomial name
- Ptyongnathosia cotopaxiana Razowski & Wojtusiak, 2008

Species of moth

Ptyongnathosia cotopaxiana is a species of moth of the family Tortricidae. It is found in Cotopaxi Province, Ecuador.

The wingspan is about 16.5 mm.

== Etymology ==
The species name refers to the province of Cotopaxi.
