= Evelyn Reed =

American Marxist (1905–1979)

- Born: October 31, 1905; Haledon, New Jersey, US
- Died: March 22, 1979 (aged 73); New York City, New York, US
- Occupations: Women's Rights Activist, Public Speaker, Book Author
- Writing career
- Language: English
- Period: 1954-1971
- Subjects: Feminism, Marxism, Women's Rights
- Notable works: "Myth of Women's Inferiority", "Cosmetics, Fashions, and the Exploitation of Women", "A Study of the Feminine Critique", "Is Biology Woman's Fate?"

Evelyn Reed (October 31, 1905 – March 22, 1979) was an American Marxist, Trotskyist, and women's rights activist.

Born and raised in Haledon, New Jersey, along with her two sisters, Reed left for New York City while she was still a teenager, and engaged in her first overtly political act in 1934 when participating in a demonstration at Rockefeller Center against the destruction of revolutionary murals created by the renowned Mexican artist, Diego Rivera. After a brief marriage to an aspiring writer named Osborn Andreas, during which time Reed lived in Clinton, Iowa for three years with her husband before returning to New York City, a 34-year-old Reed traveled to Mexico several times from December 1939 to October 1940 to spend time with the exiled Russian Revolutionary Leon Trotsky and his wife Natalia Sedova. Reed also stayed with Natalia to give her support after Trotsky was assassinated in August 1940.

It was in January 1940 at Trotsky's house, on the Avenida Viena in Coyoacán, where Reed had also met the American Trotskyist leader James P. Cannon, who was the leader of the Socialist Workers Party. Reed then joined the Socialist Workers Party at Trotsky's urging. Reed discussed with Trotsky her personal plans, her place in the party, and her conflict with her sister who still supported her financially. Reed remained a leading party member for over 39 years, right up until her death.

As an active participant in second-wave feminism and the women's liberation movement throughout the 1960s and 1970s, Reed was a founding member of the Women's National Abortion Action Coalition in 1971. During these years, she spoke and debated on women's rights in cities throughout the United States, Canada, Australia, New Zealand, Japan, Ireland, the United Kingdom and France.

Inspired by the works on women and the family by Friedrich Engels and Alexandra Kollontai, Reed is the author of many books on Marxist feminism and the origin of the oppression of women and the fight for their emancipation. Some of the most notable works by Reed are: Problems of Women's Liberation, Woman's Evolution: From Matriarchal Clan to Patriarchal Family, Is Biology Woman's Destiny?, and Cosmetics, Fashions, and the Exploitation of Women (with Joseph Hansen and Mary-Alice Waters).

She was nominated as a candidate for President of the United States for the Socialist Workers Party in the 1972 United States presidential election. On the ballot in only three states (Indiana, New York, and Wisconsin), Reed received a total of 13,878 votes. The main Socialist Workers Party presidential candidate in 1972 was Linda Jenness, who received 52,801 votes.

Reed died in New York City on March 22, 1979, aged 73.

== Quote ==
The woman question can only be resolved through the lineup of working men and women against the ruling men and women. This means that the interests of the workers as a class are identical; and not the interests of all women as a sex.

Ruling-class women have exactly the same interest in upholding and perpetuating capitalist society as their men have. The bourgeois feminists fought, among other things, for the right of women as well as men to hold property in their own name. They won this right. Today, plutocratic women hold fabulous wealth in their own names. They are completely in alliance with the plutocratic men to perpetuate the capitalist system. They are not in alliance with the working women, whose needs can only be served through the abolition of capitalism. Thus, the emancipation of working women will not be achieved in alliance with women of the enemy class, but just the opposite; in a struggle against them as part and parcel of the whole class struggle.

— Cosmetics, Fashions, and the Exploitation of Women

Party political offices
| Preceded by Fred Halstead | Socialist Workers Party nominee for President of the United States; 1972 | Succeeded by Peter Camejo |
