= Ptyongnathosia harpifera =

Scientific classification
- Domain: Eukaryota
- Kingdom: Animalia
- Phylum: Arthropoda
- Class: Insecta
- Order: Lepidoptera
- Family: Tortricidae
- Genus: Ptyongnathosia
- Species: P. harpifera

Binomial name
- Ptyongnathosia harpifera Razowski & Wojtusiak, 2009

Species of moth

Ptyongnathosia harpifera is a species of moth of the family Tortricidae. It is found in Napo Province, Ecuador.

The wingspan is about 19.5 mm.
