= Véronique Le Guen =

French speleologist (1956–1990)

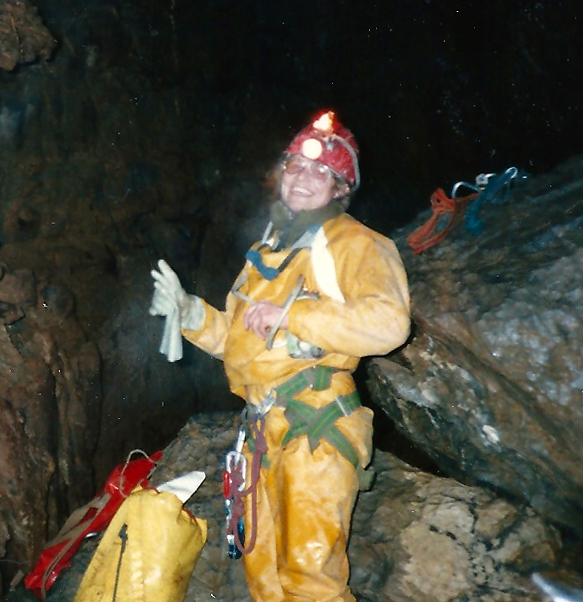
- Véronique Le Guen in 1988 during a Tête Sauvage - Verna crossing, Pierre Saint Martin Cave, Pyrénées-Atlantiques, France.
- Born: Véronique Borel; 16 July 1956; Saint-Maur-des-Fossés, Val-de-Marne, France
- Died: 18 January 1990 (aged 33); 19th arrondissement of Paris, France
- Education: Sciences Po
- Occupation: Speleologist

Véronique Borel-Le Guen (16 July 1956 – 18 January 1990) was a French speleologist. She was born Véronique Borel in Saint-Maur-des-Fossés, in the southeastern suburbs of Paris. Borel studied at Sciences Po before becoming the executive secretary in a publishing house. She married Francis Le Guen.

== Career ==
Le Guen became an expert cave diver, equipped with a diving suit and scuba set. She held the record for 47 hours of immersion in a sump in Australia.

Because of her physical and mental strength, Le Guen was selected by speleologist Michel Siffre to participate in an underground isolation experiment without time stimuli to study the human circadian rhythm. The study was in collaboration with CNRS, CNES and CEA.

On 10 August 1988, Le Guen descended to a depth of 82 metres into the Valat-Nègre sinkhole in the causse Noir, near Millau, in southwest France. She had radio contact with the surface, but no indication of time was communicated to her. She spent a total of 111 days in isolation, during which her sleeping-waking patterns quickly went out of phase with days above ground. Le Guen emerged on 29 November 1988. This study paved the way for a number of further isolation studies into biological rhythms and sleep cycles.

== Death ==
On 18 January 1990, fourteen months after the conclusion of the experiment Véronique Le Guen was found dead in her car parked on the rue du Pré-Saint-Gervais in the 19th arrondissement of Paris. She had taken a fatal dose of barbiturates.

== Publications ==
- Seule au fond du gouffre, Arthaud, 1989.
- Curieux objets, étranges histoires (Flammarion, 2016) with Pierre Bellemare

== Gallery ==
Véronique Le Guen in 1988

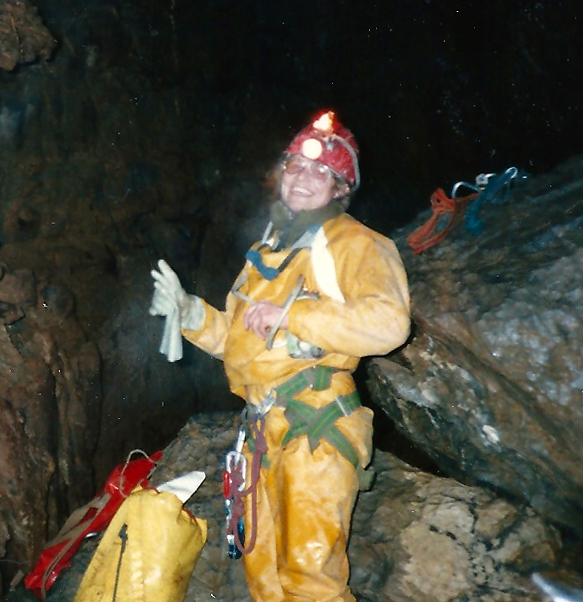
Traversing Tête Sauvage - Verna, Pierre Saint Martin, Pyrénées-Atlantiques, France.

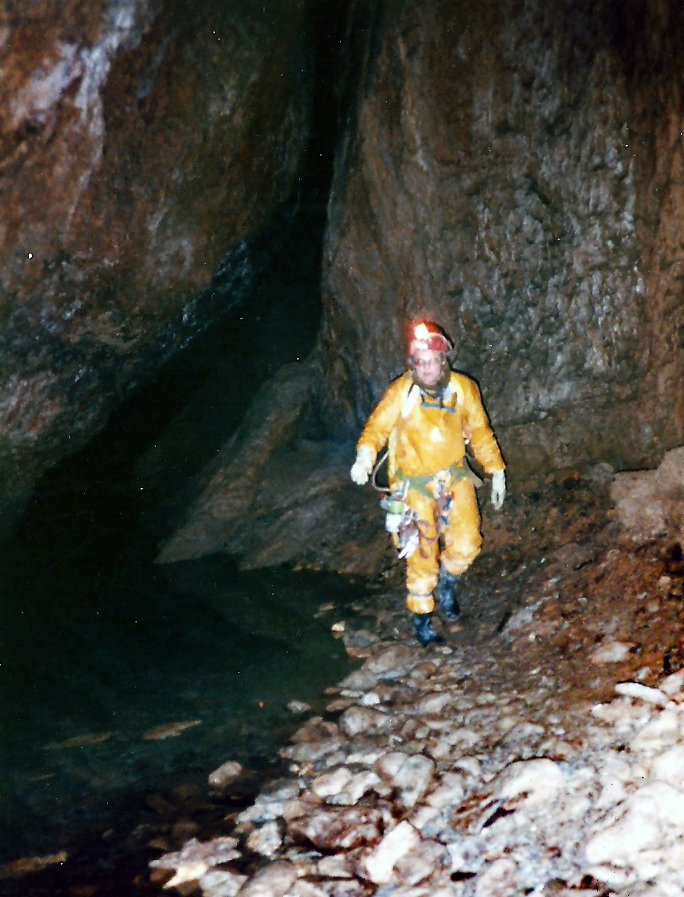
Galerie du gouffre de la Pierre Saint Martin, France / Spain.

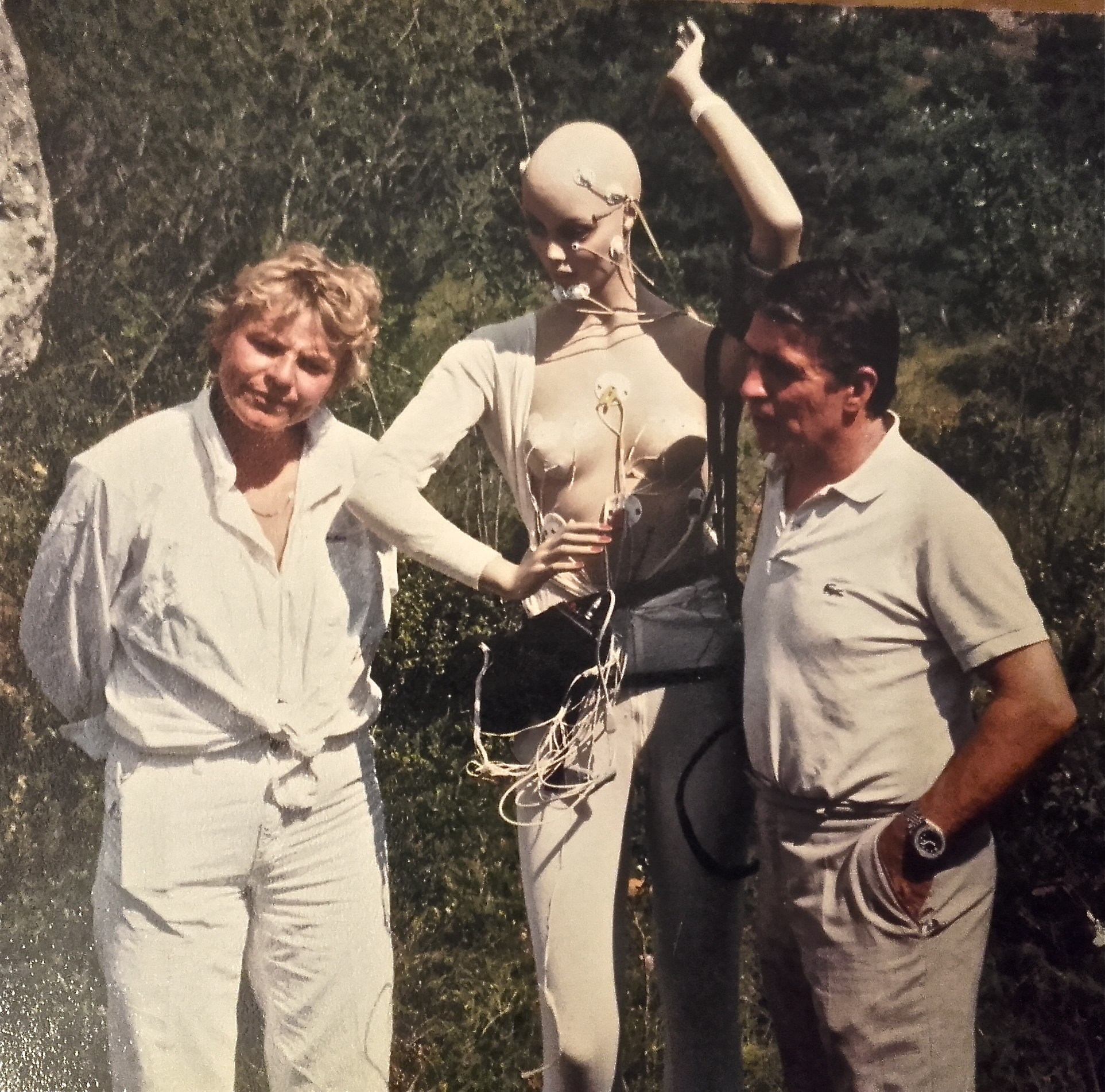
Véronique Le Guen with Michel Siffre before the experiment.

== See also ==
- Chronobiology
