= Ptyongnathosia oxynosocia =

Scientific classification
- Kingdom: Animalia
- Phylum: Arthropoda
- Clade: Pancrustacea
- Class: Insecta
- Order: Lepidoptera
- Family: Tortricidae
- Genus: Ptyongnathosia
- Species: P. oxynosocia

Binomial name
- Ptyongnathosia oxynosocia Razowski & Becker, 2002

Species of moth

Ptyongnathosia oxynosocia is a species of moth of the family Tortricidae. It is endemic to Ecuador (Loja Province).
