= Ptyongnathosia =

Scientific classification
- Kingdom: Animalia
- Phylum: Arthropoda
- Clade: Pancrustacea
- Class: Insecta
- Order: Lepidoptera
- Family: Tortricidae
- Genus: Ptyongnathosia; Razowski, 1988

Genus of tortrix moths

Ptyongnathosia is a genus of moths belonging to the family Tortricidae.

== Species ==
- Ptyongnathosia cotopaxiana Razowski & Wojtusiak, 2008
- Ptyongnathosia flaminia (Meyrick, 1926)
- Ptyongnathosia harpifera Razowski & Wojtusiak, 2009
- Ptyongnathosia lativalva Razowski & Wojtusiak, 2010
- Ptyongnathosia lobosaccula Razowski & Wojtusiak, 2010
- Ptyongnathosia oxybela Razowski, 1988
- Ptyongnathosia oxynosocia Razowski & Becker, 2002
- Ptyongnathosia palliorana Razowski & Wojtusiak, 2010
- Ptyongnathosia pectinata Razowski & Pelz, 2007
- Ptyongnathosia spinosa Razowski & Wojtusiak, 2008

== See also ==
- List of Tortricidae genera
