= Fred Halstead =

American politician (1927–1988)

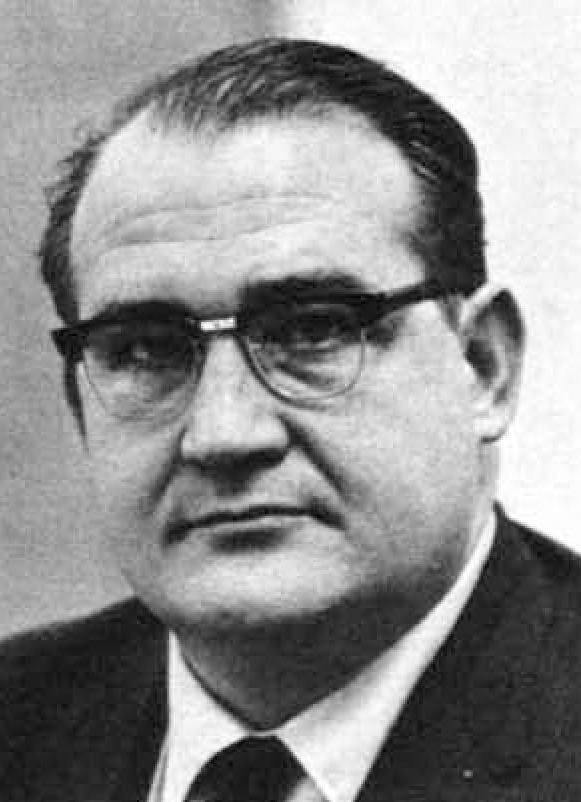
- Born: April 21, 1927
- Died: June 2, 1988 (aged 61); Los Angeles, California, U.S.
- Known for: Socialist Workers Party presidential candidate, 1968

Fred W. Halstead (April 21, 1927 – June 2, 1988) was the Socialist Workers Party's candidate for President of the United States in 1968. His running mate was Paul Boutelle.

Halstead played a significant role in the movement against the Vietnam War, outlined in his book Out Now! He also was a staff writer on The Militant, the publication of the Socialist Workers Party.

In addition to his 1968 presidential run, Halstead was the Socialist Workers candidate for New York City Controller in 1961 (0.22% of the vote), and for California Governor in 1978 (0.01% of the vote).

Halstead was a 6′6″, 350-pound ex–garment cutter who worked briefly as a bouncer in a country-and-western saloon in the 1950s, when he was on the blacklist. On July 10, 1968, Halstead appeared on the political talk show Firing Line.

== Bibliography ==
- GIs Speak Out Against the War: The Case of the Ft. Jackson 8 (1970) ISBN 978-0-87348-127-4
- Out Now!: A Participant's Account of the American Movement against the Vietnam War (1978) ISBN 0-913460-48-6
- What Working People Should Know About the Dangers of Nuclear Power (1979) ISBN 0-87348-429-0
- The 1985-86 Hormel Meat-Packers Strike in Austin, Minnesota (1987) ISBN 0-87348-489-4

Party political offices
Preceded by Clifton DeBerry	Socialist Workers Party nominee for President of the United States; 1968	Succeeded by Linda Jenness and Evelyn Reed
