= Ptyongnathosia pectinata =

Scientific classification
- Kingdom: Animalia
- Phylum: Arthropoda
- Class: Insecta
- Order: Lepidoptera
- Family: Tortricidae
- Genus: Ptyongnathosia
- Species: P. pectinata

Binomial name
- Ptyongnathosia pectinata Razowski & Pelz, 2007

Species of moth

Ptyongnathosia pectinata is a species of moth of the family Tortricidae. It is found in Napo Province, Ecuador.

The wingspan is 14–16 mm.
