= Ptyongnathosia lobosaccula =

Scientific classification
- Domain: Eukaryota
- Kingdom: Animalia
- Phylum: Arthropoda
- Class: Insecta
- Order: Lepidoptera
- Family: Tortricidae
- Genus: Ptyongnathosia
- Species: P. lobosaccula

Binomial name
- Ptyongnathosia lobosaccula Razowski & Wojtusiak, 2010

Species of moth

Ptyongnathosia lobosaccula is a species of moth of the family Tortricidae. It is found in Peru.

The wingspan is about 17 mm. The ground colour of the forewings is pale cream ferruginous, but paler, more greyish cream along the costa. There are numerous brownish spots, which become smaller and blackish in the subdorsal area. The hindwings are creamish, tinged ochreous posteriorly and dotted with grey.

== Etymology ==
The species name refers to the lobe of the sacculus.
