= Ptyongnathosia oxybela =

Scientific classification
- Kingdom: Animalia
- Phylum: Arthropoda
- Class: Insecta
- Order: Lepidoptera
- Family: Tortricidae
- Genus: Ptyongnathosia
- Species: P. oxybela

Binomial name
- Ptyongnathosia oxybela Razowski, 1988

Species of moth

Ptyongnathosia oxybela is a species of moth of the family Tortricidae. It is found in Colombia.
