= 1972 United States presidential election in Indiana =

- November 7, 1972
- Turnout: 60.8% ▼8.7 pp

Nominee	Richard Nixon	George McGovern
Party	Republican	Democratic
Home state	California	South Dakota
Running mate	Spiro Agnew	Sargent Shriver (Note: Replacing Thomas Eagleton)
Electoral vote	13	0
Popular vote	1,405,155	708,568
Percentage	66.11%	33.34%
County results
Nixon
50–60%
60–70%
70–80%
80–90%
President before election
Richard Nixon
Republican
Elected President
Richard Nixon
Republican

A presidential election was held in Indiana on November 7, 1972. The Republican ticket of the incumbent president of the United States Richard Nixon and the vice president of the United States Spiro Agnew defeated the Democratic ticket of the junior U.S. senator from South Dakota George McGovern and the former U.S. ambassador to France Sargent Shriver. Nixon defeated McGovern in the national election with 520 electoral votes.

== Primary elections ==
=== Republican Party ===
Indiana Republican primary, May 2, 1972
Party	Candidate	Votes	%
Republican	Richard Nixon	417,069	100.00
Total votes		417,069	100.00

=== Democratic Party ===
Indiana Democratic primary, May 2, 1972
Party	Candidate	Votes	%
Democratic	Hubert Humphrey	354,244	47.14
Democratic	George Wallace	309,495	41.18
Democratic	Edmund Muskie (withdrawn)	87,719	11.67
Total votes		751,458	100.00

== General election ==
=== Statistics ===
Nixon became the only presidential candidate from either party to carry every county in the state. His 32-point margin of victory remains the best performance by a Republican presidential candidate in Indiana. As of the 2024 presidential election, this is the most recent election in which the Republican ticket carried Lake County. It is also the most recent presidential election in which a candidate won every Indiana county.

=== Results ===
1972 United States presidential election in Indiana
Party	Candidate	Votes	%	±%
Republican	Richard Nixon Spiro Agnew	1,405,154	66.11	▲15.82
Democratic	George McGovern Sargent Shriver	708,568	33.34	▼4.65
Socialist Workers	Evelyn Reed Clifton DeBerry	5,575	0.26	▲0.20
Peace and Freedom	Benjamin Spock Julius Hobson	4,554	0.21	▲0.21
Socialist Labor	Louis Fisher Genevieve Gundersen	1,688	0.08	▲0.08
Total votes		2,125,529	100.00	

=== Results by county ===
1968 United States presidential election in Indiana by county
County	Richard Nixon Republican		George McGovern Democratic		Evelyn Reed Socialist Workers		Benjamin Spock Peace and Freedom		Louis Fisher Socialist Labor		Margin		Total
County	Votes	%	Votes	%	Votes	%	Votes	%	Votes	%	Votes	%	Total
Adams	7,549	65.24%	3,971	34.32%	10	0.09%	38	0.33%	4	0.03%	3,578	30.92%	11,572
Allen	76,924	66.20%	38,621	33.24%	364	0.31%	212	0.18%	78	0.07%	38,303	32.96%	116,199
Bartholomew	17,365	70.87%	6,974	28.46%	86	0.35%	67	0.27%	10	0.04%	10,391	42.41%	24,502
Benton	3,703	70.01%	1,566	29.61%	2	0.04%	15	0.28%	3	0.06%	2,137	40.40%	5,289
Blackford	3,876	62.33%	2,311	37.16%	19	0.31%	6	0.10%	7	0.11%	1,565	25.17%	6,219
Boone	9,874	75.10%	3,235	24.61%	12	0.09%	22	0.17%	4	0.03%	6,639	50.49%	13,147
Brown	2,737	65.06%	1,443	34.30%	2	0.05%	19	0.45%	6	0.14%	1,294	30.76%	4,207
Carroll	5,885	72.32%	2,214	27.21%	7	0.09%	28	0.34%	3	0.04%	3,671	45.11%	8,137
Cass	12,681	69.77%	5,317	29.25%	122	0.67%	42	0.23%	14	0.08%	7,364	40.52%	18,176
Clark	16,111	59.42%	10,838	39.97%	109	0.40%	38	0.14%	17	0.06%	5,273	19.45%	27,113
Clay	7,146	65.34%	3,742	34.21%	17	0.16%	25	0.23%	7	0.06%	3,404	31.13%	10,937
Clinton	9,849	69.42%	4,283	30.19%	17	0.12%	27	0.19%	11	0.08%	5,566	39.23%	14,187
Crawford	2,623	58.96%	1,801	40.48%	3	0.07%	18	0.40%	4	0.09%	822	18.48%	4,449
Daviess	8,490	70.33%	3,538	29.31%	12	0.10%	29	0.24%	2	0.02%	4,952	41.02%	12,071
Dearborn	7,689	64.69%	4,137	34.81%	39	0.33%	14	0.12%	6	0.05%	3,552	29.88%	11,885
Decatur	6,761	68.84%	2,994	30.48%	35	0.36%	22	0.22%	10	0.10%	3,767	38.36%	9,822
DeKalb	8,834	66.44%	4,354	32.74%	67	0.50%	23	0.17%	19	0.14%	4,480	33.70%	13,297
Delaware	32,468	64.21%	17,936	35.47%	43	0.09%	97	0.19%	23	0.05%	14,532	28.74%	50,567
Dubois	6,637	50.36%	6,365	48.30%	144	1.09%	22	0.17%	11	0.08%	272	2.06%	13,179
Elkhart	31,009	70.57%	12,659	28.81%	132	0.30%	109	0.25%	32	0.07%	18,350	41.76%	43,941
Fayette	7,273	67.16%	3,519	32.50%	20	0.18%	9	0.08%	8	0.07%	3,754	34.66%	10,829
Floyd	13,198	58.31%	9,243	40.83%	10	0.04%	26	0.11%	159	0.70%	3,955	17.48%	22,636
Fountain	5,979	66.41%	2,977	33.07%	11	0.12%	28	0.31%	8	0.09%	3,002	33.34%	9,003
Franklin	4,324	66.74%	2,131	32.89%	6	0.09%	14	0.22%	4	0.06%	2,193	33.85%	6,479
Fulton	6,170	73.82%	2,150	25.72%	3	0.04%	27	0.32%	8	0.10%	4,020	48.10%	8,358
Gibson	9,115	61.51%	5,633	38.01%	17	0.11%	44	0.30%	10	0.07%	3,482	23.50%	14,819
Grant	20,969	72.41%	7,912	27.32%	19	0.07%	37	0.13%	21	0.07%	13,057	45.09%	28,958
Greene	8,454	64.80%	4,450	34.11%	109	0.84%	22	0.17%	11	0.08%	4,003	30.69%	13,045
Hamilton	20,247	82.74%	4,151	16.96%	14	0.06%	51	0.21%	7	0.03%	16,096	65.78%	24,470
Hancock	11,019	77.87%	3,069	21.69%	32	0.23%	25	0.18%	5	0.04%	7,950	56.18%	14,150
Harrison	5,910	59.77%	3,927	39.71%	18	0.18%	27	0.27%	6	0.06%	1,983	20.06%	9,888
Hendricks	17,699	79.89%	4,384	19.79%	33	0.15%	33	0.15%	4	0.02%	13,315	60.10%	22,153
Henry	14,538	71.94%	5,610	27.76%	18	0.09%	30	0.15%	12	0.06%	8,928	44.18%	20,208
Howard	23,089	73.67%	8,083	25.79%	69	0.22%	73	0.23%	27	0.09%	15,006	47.88%	31,341
Huntington	10,858	68.48%	4,908	30.96%	10	0.06%	30	0.19%	49	0.31%	5,950	37.52%	15,855
Jackson	9,546	64.99%	4,984	33.93%	121	0.82%	25	0.17%	13	0.09%	4,562	31.06%	14,689
Jasper	6,369	76.21%	1,920	22.97%	46	0.55%	14	0.17%	8	0.10%	4,449	53.24%	8,357
Jay	6,090	64.21%	3,349	35.31%	3	0.03%	35	0.37%	7	0.07%	2,741	28.90%	9,484
Jefferson	6,722	60.54%	4,267	38.43%	85	0.77%	22	0.20%	7	0.06%	2,455	22.11%	11,103
Jennings	5,156	63.21%	2,903	35.59%	61	0.75%	24	0.29%	13	0.16%	2,253	27.62%	8,157
Johnson	17,537	77.17%	5,067	22.30%	48	0.21%	58	0.26%	14	0.06%	12,470	54.87%	22,724
Knox	11,940	65.62%	6,089	33.46%	111	0.61%	40	0.22%	16	0.09%	5,851	32.16%	18,196
Kosciusko	16,216	78.93%	4,233	20.60%	11	0.05%	67	0.33%	18	0.09%	11,983	58.33%	20,545
LaGrange	4,152	71.11%	1,658	28.40%	5	0.09%	18	0.31%	6	0.10%	2,494	42.71%	5,839
Lake	115,480	56.24%	88,510	43.10%	912	0.44%	277	0.13%	163	0.08%	26,970	13.14%	205,342
LaPorte	26,243	65.98%	13,222	33.24%	193	0.49%	79	0.20%	39	0.10%	13,021	32.74%	39,776
Lawrence	10,936	71.55%	4,278	27.99%	36	0.24%	23	0.15%	11	0.07%	6,658	43.56%	15,284
Madison	39,036	64.92%	20,921	34.79%	56	0.09%	90	0.15%	31	0.05%	18,115	30.13%	60,134
Marion	206,065	66.52%	102,166	32.98%	482	0.16%	839	0.27%	214	0.07%	103,899	33.54%	309,766
Marshall	11,908	73.02%	4,349	26.67%	28	0.17%	14	0.09%	9	0.06%	7,559	46.35%	16,308
Martin	3,470	62.99%	2,021	36.69%	5	0.09%	10	0.18%	3	0.05%	1,449	26.30%	5,509
Miami	9,477	70.46%	3,889	28.91%	52	0.39%	22	0.16%	10	0.07%	5,588	41.55%	13,450
Monroe	19,953	56.05%	15,241	42.82%	232	0.65%	148	0.42%	22	0.06%	4,712	13.23%	35,596
Montgomery	10,997	75.99%	3,431	23.71%	20	0.14%	19	0.13%	4	0.03%	7,566	52.28%	14,471
Morgan	11,980	77.62%	3,390	21.96%	21	0.14%	31	0.20%	13	0.08%	8,590	55.66%	15,435
Newton	3,771	75.00%	1,252	24.90%	4	0.08%	1	0.02%	0	0.00%	2,519	50.10%	5,028
Noble	7,916	64.75%	4,250	34.76%	33	0.27%	17	0.14%	10	0.08%	3,666	29.99%	12,226
Ohio	1,368	59.50%	922	40.10%	6	0.26%	3	0.13%	0	0.00%	446	19.40%	2,299
Orange	5,715	65.89%	2,932	33.80%	4	0.05%	21	0.24%	2	0.02%	2,783	32.09%	8,674
Owen	3,896	69.25%	1,708	30.36%	7	0.12%	11	0.20%	4	0.07%	2,188	38.89%	5,626
Parke	5,014	69.16%	2,207	30.44%	8	0.11%	14	0.19%	7	0.10%	2,807	38.72%	7,250
Perry	5,204	54.72%	4,277	44.97%	6	0.06%	18	0.19%	5	0.05%	927	9.75%	9,510
Pike	4,252	61.28%	2,648	38.16%	7	0.10%	25	0.36%	7	0.10%	1,604	23.12%	6,939
Porter	26,877	74.60%	8,943	24.82%	87	0.24%	86	0.24%	37	0.10%	17,934	49.78%	36,030
Posey	6,771	65.24%	3,586	34.55%	5	0.05%	8	0.08%	8	0.08%	3,185	30.69%	10,378
Pulaski	4,243	69.04%	1,863	30.31%	20	0.33%	13	0.21%	7	0.11%	2,380	38.73%	6,146
Putnam	7,879	70.08%	3,339	29.70%	1	0.01%	19	0.17%	5	0.04%	4,540	40.38%	11,243
Randolph	8,754	71.57%	3,409	27.87%	12	0.10%	46	0.38%	11	0.09%	5,345	43.70%	12,232
Ripley	6,594	64.45%	3,601	35.20%	7	0.07%	15	0.15%	14	0.14%	2,993	29.25%	10,231
Rush	5,965	76.95%	1,764	22.76%	8	0.10%	13	0.17%	2	0.03%	4,171	53.59%	7,782
Scott	3,564	55.77%	2,785	43.58%	9	0.14%	23	0.36%	10	0.16%	779	12.19%	6,391
Shelby	10,794	72.44%	4,028	27.03%	50	0.34%	19	0.13%	9	0.06%	6,766	45.41%	14,900
Spencer	5,518	58.61%	3,867	41.07%	17	0.18%	6	0.06%	7	0.07%	1,651	17.54%	9,415
St. Joseph	64,808	60.55%	41,629	38.89%	318	0.30%	166	0.16%	118	0.11%	23,179	21.66%	107,039
Starke	5,520	64.43%	2,994	34.95%	35	0.41%	11	0.13%	7	0.08%	2,526	29.48%	8,567
Steuben	5,636	69.80%	2,401	29.73%	5	0.06%	29	0.36%	4	0.05%	3,235	40.07%	8,075
Sullivan	5,338	59.30%	3,624	40.26%	15	0.17%	17	0.19%	7	0.08%	1,714	19.04%	9,001
Switzerland	1,872	53.53%	1,612	46.10%	8	0.23%	2	0.06%	3	0.09%	260	7.43%	3,497
Tippecanoe	31,565	68.08%	14,598	31.48%	31	0.07%	153	0.33%	19	0.04%	16,967	36.60%	46,366
Tipton	5,674	72.67%	2,095	26.83%	24	0.31%	14	0.18%	1	0.01%	3,579	45.84%	7,808
Union	2,043	72.50%	765	27.15%	2	0.07%	7	0.25%	1	0.04%	1,278	45.35%	2,818
Vanderburgh	48,806	68.32%	22,163	31.02%	242	0.34%	184	0.26%	42	0.06%	26,643	37.30%	71,437
Vermillion	4,764	57.24%	3,515	42.23%	10	0.12%	26	0.31%	8	0.10%	1,249	15.01%	8,323
Vigo	29,730	60.73%	18,898	38.60%	170	0.35%	139	0.28%	20	0.04%	10,832	22.13%	48,957
Wabash	10,011	68.29%	4,601	31.39%	8	0.05%	31	0.21%	8	0.05%	5,410	36.90%	14,659
Warren	2,746	69.96%	1,164	29.66%	3	0.08%	8	0.20%	4	0.10%	1,582	40.30%	3,925
Warrick	8,520	65.84%	4,296	33.20%	85	0.66%	31	0.24%	9	0.07%	4,224	32.64%	12,941
Washington	4,758	60.06%	3,086	38.95%	62	0.78%	9	0.11%	7	0.09%	1,672	21.11%	7,922
Wayne	21,610	73.60%	7,655	26.07%	23	0.08%	53	0.18%	20	0.07%	13,955	47.53%	29,361
Wells	6,425	65.77%	3,244	33.21%	72	0.74%	18	0.18%	10	0.10%	3,181	32.56%	9,769
White	7,419	73.19%	2,675	26.39%	11	0.11%	23	0.23%	9	0.09%	4,744	46.80%	10,137
Whitley	7,489	65.67%	3,838	33.65%	11	0.10%	55	0.48%	11	0.10%	3,651	32.02%	11,404
TOTAL	1,405,154	66.11%	708,568	33.34%	5,575	0.26%	4,544	0.21%	1,688	0.08%	696,586	32.77%	2,125,529

== See also ==
- United States presidential elections in Indiana

== Bibliography ==
- Congressional Quarterly (1985). Congressional Quarterly's Guide to U.S. Elections (2nd ed.). Washington D.C.: Congressional Quarterly.
- Conrad, Larry A. (1972). 1972 Election Report State of Indiana. Indianapolis: Indiana Secretary of State.
- Madison, James H. (1986). The Indiana Way: A State History. Bloomington: Indiana University Press.
- McGillivray, Alice V.; Scammon, Richard M. (1994). America at the Polls, 1960–1992: Kennedy to Clinton; A Handbook of American Presidential Election Statistics. Washington, D.C.: Congressional Quarterly.
- Sullivan, Robert David (June 29, 2016). "How the Red and Blue Map Evolved over the Past Century". America.
- Thomas, G. Scott (1987). The Pursuit of the White House: A Handbook of Presidential Election Statistics and History. New York: Greenwood Press.
