= Milutin Veljković =

Serbian speleologist (1935 – 2011)

- Veljković on the cover of the book Pod Kamenim Nebom (English: Under the Stone Sky), 1972
- Born: 1935; Zaječar, Serbia
- Died: 2011; United States of America

Milutin Veljković (1935–2011) was a Serbian speleologist, electrician, and physics student, best known for setting a new Guinness World Record in 1970 for the longest consecutive time spent underground (464 days).

== Biography ==
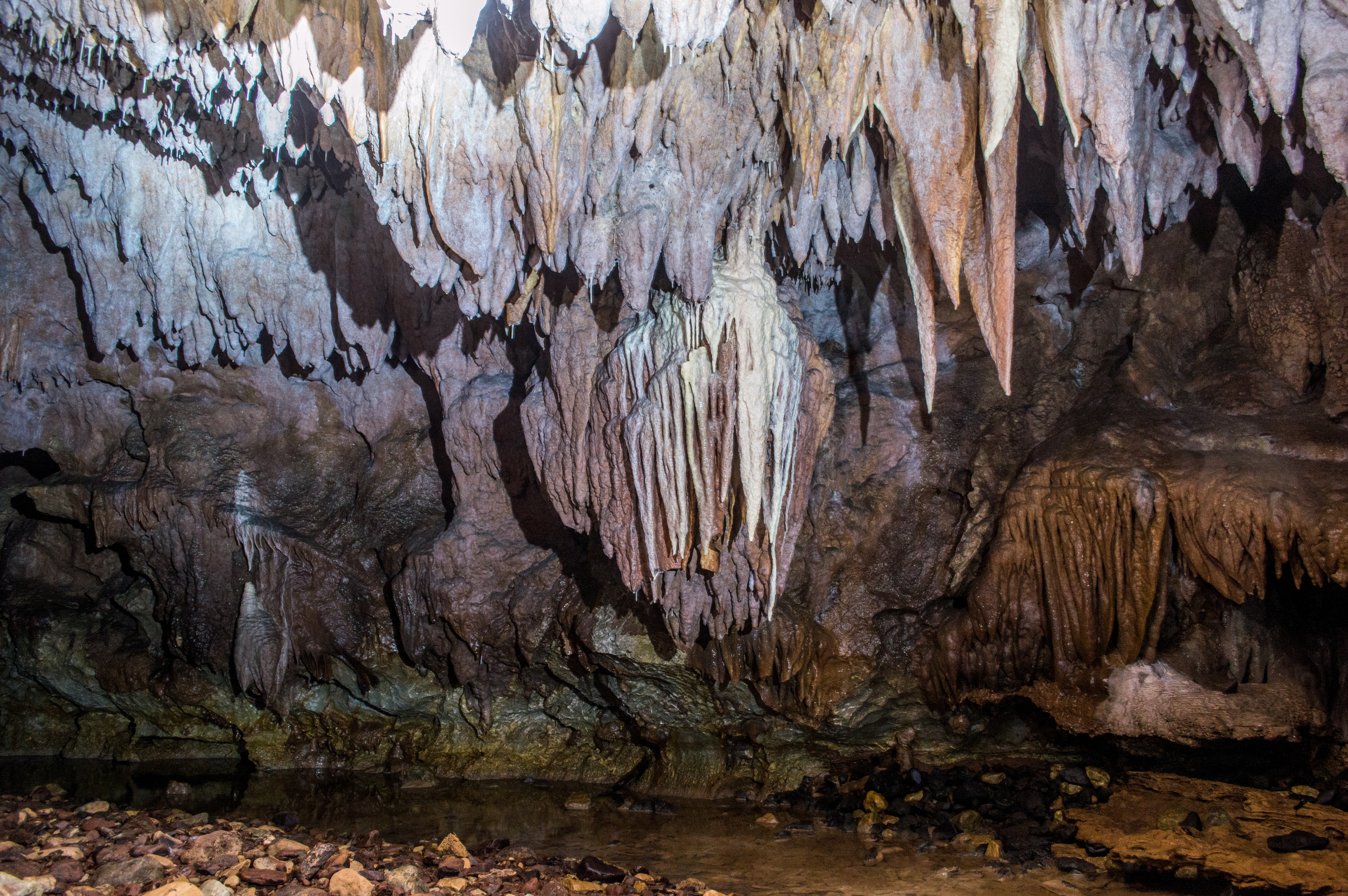
Samar Cave in Serbia

Milutin Veljković was born in 1935 in the village of Gornja Bela Reka near Zaječar. In the summer of 1969, 34-year-old Milutin went to the southeast of Serbia. He intended to spend 15 months in the unexplored Samar Cave. The cave, which is about two kilometers long, is located near the village of Kopajkošara. He wanted to explore it, but also to break the world record for the longest time spent consecutively underground. The previous record was held by Henri Fiout, a French man who remained underground for 109 days.

Veljković entered the cave on June 24, 1969, and left it 15 months later, on September 29, 1970. In doing so, he set a new record for the longest stay underground. He also kept a diary in which he described in detail the daily activities he practiced during his stay in the cave.

Shortly after this, Veljković also wrote a book based on the diary he kept, which was called Under the Stone Sky.

== Legacy ==
The documentary Speleonaut / Under the Stone Sky, directed by Sonja Đekić, was filmed about him.

In 2021, Spanish athlete Beatriz Flamini attempted to break the record set by Veljković. Although she spent 500 days living inside of a cave in Granada, a brief excursion to the exit of the cave midway through her stint disqualified her from beating the record.
