= Ptyongnathosia palliorana =

Scientific classification
- Domain: Eukaryota
- Kingdom: Animalia
- Phylum: Arthropoda
- Class: Insecta
- Order: Lepidoptera
- Family: Tortricidae
- Genus: Ptyongnathosia
- Species: P. palliorana

Binomial name
- Ptyongnathosia palliorana Razowski & Wojtusiak, 2010

Species of moth

Ptyongnathosia palliorana is a species of moth of the family Tortricidae. It is found in Peru.

The wingspan is about 20 mm.
