= Flaminia gens =

Ancient Roman family

The gens Flaminia was a plebeian family of ancient Rome. During the first five centuries of Rome, no mention is made of any member of the Flaminia gens. In former times the Flaminii were believed to be only a family of the Quinctia gens; but this opinion arose from a confusion of the Flaminii with the Flaminini, the latter of whom belonged to the ancient patrician Quinctia gens.

== Origin ==
The name Flaminius is evidently a derivative of flamen, and seems to have originally denoted a servant of a flamen.

== Praenomina used ==
The main praenomina used by the Flaminii were Gaius and Lucius. At least one of the Flaminii bore the praenomen Titus, but he may have been a freedman, and thus it is not apparent whether this name was regularly used by the Flaminii.

== Branches and cognomina ==
The only family names of the Flaminia gens that we know are Chilo and Flamma. There is no evidence for the cognomen Nepos, which Orelli gives to the Flaminius who fell in battle at Lake Trasimene.

Chilo, or Cilo, as the name seems to have been written in either way on coins of the Flaminia gens, is found as a surname in a number of Roman families. The Latin grammarians, however, state that Cilo was applied to a person with a long and narrow head, and Chilo to one with large or thick lips.

== Members ==
This list includes abbreviated praenomina. For an explanation of this practice, see filiation.

- Lucius Flaminius, grandfather of the consul of 223 and 217 BC.
- Gaius Flaminius L. f., father of the consul of 223 and 217 BC.
- Gaius Flaminius C. f. L. n., consul in 223 and 217 BC, magister equitum in 221, and censor in 220. In his first consulship, he triumphed over the Insubres. In his second, he fell in battle against Hannibal at Lake Trasimene.
- Gaius Flaminius C. f. C. n., served under Scipio Africanus in Hispania during the Second Punic War. He was consul in 187 BC, and defeated the Triniates and the Apuani.
- Gaius Flaminius, praetor in BC 66, together with Cicero. Some years before, Flaminius had been curule aedile, and Cicero had defended Decimus Matrinius before his tribunal.
- Gaius Flaminius, a man of Arretium, whither he had probably gone with the colonists whom Sulla had established there. He is mentioned as one of the accomplices of Catiline. In one manuscript of Sallustius he bears the cognomen Flamma.
- Titus Flaminius Flamma, possibly a freedman of the Flaminia gens, was a debtor of Lucius Tullius Montanus, whose brother-in-law wrote to Cicero to beg indulgence or delay in repayment of the debt. Cicero frequently requested Atticus to bring Flamma to a settlement; and writing to his own freedman, Marcus Tullius Tiro, Cicero hints at stronger measures, and his desire to have part of the debt paid by the first of January, BC 44.
- Lucius Flaminius Chilo or Cilo, appears only on coins of the Flaminia gens. An inscription on the obverse may indicate that Chilo was one of the quattuorviri monetales, appointed by Caesar in place of the earlier triumviri monetales.

== See also ==
- List of Roman gentes
