= Herma Briffault =

American ghostwriter and translator of French and Spanish literature

Herma Briffault, born Herma Hoyt (1898–1981) was an American ghostwriter and translator of French and Spanish literature.

== Life ==
Herma Hoyt was born in Reedsville, Ohio on May 4, 1898. In the 1920s, she went to live in Paris, divorcing her first husband J. Eugene Mullins. In 1931, she married the French-born anthropological writer Robert Briffault, and started a career as a ghost writer. She wrote eighteen books under other people's names, including a 1928 biography of the hotelier César Ritz under the name of his widow, Marie-Louise Ritz.

The pair endured the Nazi occupation of Paris as enemy aliens under house arrest. Robert Briffault died in 1948. Around that time, Briffault began working with Vilhjalmur Stefansson to research the history of Russian-American attempts to join Alaska and Siberia by telegraph. She also embarked on her translation career.

Briffault worked as an assistant editor for Las Americas Publishing Company from 1957 to 1969. At the end of her life, she was living in New York City, where she died at St. Vincent's Hospital on August 13, 1981.

Briffault's papers are held at the library of Dartmouth College, with additional papers at the New York Public Library.

== Works ==
=== Translations ===
- Life is Sometimes Like That. Translated from the French by Jacques Varmel. London: Commodore Press, 1946.
- The Illusionist. Translated from the French Le rempart des Béguines by Françoise Mallet-Joris. 1952
- The sea wall. Translation of the French Barrage contre le Pacifique by Marguerite Duras. New York: The New American Library, 1952.
- Into the Labyrinth. Translated from the French Le Rempart des béguines by Françoise Mallet-Joris. London: Secker & Warburg, 1953.
- The paradise below the stairs. Translated from the French Le vert paradis by André Brincourt. New York: Duell, Sloan and Pearce, 1952.
- The joker: a novel. Translated from the French Le Gaffeur by Jean Malaquais. New York: Doubleday, 1954.
- The Red Room. Translated from the French Chambre rouge by Françoise Mallet-Joris. New York: Farrar, Straus & Cudahy, 1956.
- House of Lies. Translated from the French Les Mensonges by Françoise Mallet-Joris. New York: Farrar, Straus and Cudahy, 1957
- Andromache. Translated from the French by Jean Racine. New York: Barron's Educational Series, 1957.
- Albert Camus: the invincible summer. Translated from the French Albert Camus; ou, L'invincible été. New York: George Braziller, 1958.
- The pretentious young ladies: a one-act comedy in prose. Translated from the French Les Précieuses ridicules by Molière. New York: Barron's Educational Series, 1959.
- Café Céleste. Translated from the French L'Empire Céleste by Françoise Mallet-Joris. New York: Farrar, Straus and Cudahy, 1959.
- Saint-Exupéry. A biography. Translated from the French Saint-Exupéry by Marcel Migeo. London: Macdonald, 1961.
- Virginia Woolf. Translated from the French Virginia Woolf par elle-même by Monique Nathan. New York: Grove Press, 1961.
- The Favourite. Translated from the French Les Personnages by Françoise Mallet-Joris. London: W. H. Allen, 1962.
- The Medici Fountain: a novel. Translated from the French Les Personnages by Joseph Kessel. London: A. Barker, 1963
- Beyond Time. Translated from the French Hors du temps by Michel Siffre. London: Chatto & Windus, 1965
- (with Renaud Bruce) Interior Exile. Translated from the French and Spanish L'Exil intérieur. by Michel Siffre. London: Peter Owen, 1965
- (with Helen Beauclark et al.) Earthly paradise : an autobiography. Translated from the French Colette : autobiographie tirée des œuvres de Colette by Colette. London: Secker & Warburg, 1966
- The pure and the impure. Translated from the French Pur et l'impur by Colette. New York: Farrar, 1966.
- Signs and wonders. Translated from the French Les signes et les prodiges by Françoise Mallet-Joris. New York: Farrar, Straus and Giroux, 1967.
- The Witches: Three ages of sorcery. Translated from the French Trois âges de la nuit by Françoise Mallet-Joris. London: W. H. Allen, 1970.
- Ho Chi Minh and his Vietnam: a personal memoir. Translated from the French Face à Ho chi Minh by Jean Sainteny. 1972.
- My Prison. Translated from the Spanish Mi cárcel by Isabel Álvarez de Toledo y Maura, Duchess of Medina Sidonia. New York: Harper & Row, 1972.
- The Devastion of the Indies: a short account. Translated from the Spanish Brevísima relación de la destrucción de las Indias by Bartolomé de las Casas. New York: Seabury Press, 1974.
- The Underground Game. Translated from the French Le jeu du souterrain by Françoise Mallet-Joris. London: W. H. Allen, 1974.
- Dom Helder Camara : the violence of a peacemaker. Translated from the French Dom Helder Camara by José de Broucker. New York: Orbis Books, 1978.

=== Other ===
- (ghostwritten) César Ritz, host to the world by Marie-Louise Ritz. London: G. G. Harrap, 1938
- (ed.) The memoirs of Doctor Felix Kersten, Garden City, N.Y.: Doubleday & Co., 1947
