= Ptyongnathosia flaminia =

Scientific classification
- Kingdom: Animalia
- Phylum: Arthropoda
- Class: Insecta
- Order: Lepidoptera
- Family: Tortricidae
- Genus: Ptyongnathosia
- Species: P. flaminia

Binomial name
- Ptyongnathosia flaminia (Meyrick, 1926)

Synonyms
- Eulia flaminia Meyrick, 1926; Guarandita flaminia

Species of moth

Ptyongnathosia flaminia is a species of moth of the family Tortricidae. It is found in Colombia.
