= Maurizio Montalbini =

Italian sociologist (1953–2009)

Maurizio Montalbini (4 September 1953 – 19 September 2009) was an Italian sociologist and caver who had lived in complete isolation in an underground chamber multiple times since 1986.

== Early life, family and education ==
Montalbini was born at Senigallia, Italy, 30 km (19 mi) from Ancona.

== Career ==
Although primarily known for his cave experiments, Montalbini's work in sociology involved working with drug addicts. He later treated insomniatic patients with Under-Therapy, a method he developed.

=== Cave dwelling ===
On December 14, 1986, he entered the Frasassi Caves of the Apennine Mountains, near Ancona. A video feed was set up to monitor him from the surface. He emerged on July 12, 1987, breaking the world record for complete isolation. An Ancona interior designer Stefania Follini heard of his exploits and decided to attempt it herself; NASA sponsored her stay in a cave in New Mexico. Both Follini and Montalbini found that time passed quickly underground. Montalbini also worked with "NASA and top universities." Montalbini entered the cave Grotte di Nerone ("Nero's Caves") in Pesaro on December 5, 1992. When he exited his base (which he dubbed an Underlab) in December 6, 1993, he stated he thought the date was June 6, 1993. It was his longest stay underground at 366 days.

In October 2006, Montalbini entered Grotta Fredda ("Cold Cave") in the Apennines, where he and his team built his 10 square metre Underlab base. The base was equipped with electricity, medical monitoring equipment, running drinking water, and 85 books. He expressed an intention to spend three years there. He planned for it to be his final experiment and hoped it would provide valuable insight into the natural cycles of the body. However, he emerged in 2007 after 235 days.

Montalbini ate high protein powdered foods and pills for meals while in caves, but also brought along honey, nuts and chocolate on his most recent trip. He was also a heavy cigarette smoker at two packs a day.

Many years later in 2023, the duration record was broken by a Spanish woman, athlete Beatriz Flamini, who remained in a cave for 500 days and also felt a distorted sense of time.

== Personal life and demise ==
He was married. He and his wife had no children.

Montalbini died at age 56 in September 2009 from a stroke or heart attack at Pieve Torina near Macerata. His death was reported as not being related with his scientific occupation.

== See also ==
- Michel Siffre
- Chronobiology
- Circadian rhythm
- Stefania Follini
