= 1972 United States presidential election in Wisconsin =

- November 7, 1972

Nominee	Richard Nixon	George McGovern
Party	Republican	Democratic
Home state	California	South Dakota
Running mate	Spiro Agnew	Sargent Shriver
Electoral vote	11	0
Popular vote	989,430	810,174
Percentage	53.40%	43.72%
County results
Nixon
40–50%
50–60%
60–70%
70–80%
McGovern
40–50%
50–60%
60–70%
President before election
Richard Nixon
Republican
Elected President
Richard Nixon
Republican

The 1972 United States presidential election in Wisconsin was held on November 7, 1972, as part of the 1972 United States presidential election. Incumbent President Richard Nixon won the state of Wisconsin with 53.40 percent of the vote, carrying the state's 11 electoral votes, although Wisconsin was the fifth most Democratic state during the election, voting 13.48 points more Democratic than the nation as a whole. In no other election since the emergence of the Republican Party has Wisconsin voted so much more Democratic than the country as a whole.

McGovern won seven counties (out of 131 county-equivalents including three in Alaska that he won nationally) receiving as usual his highest vote in almost wholly Native American Menominee County where he won 62.3 percent of the vote. McGovern and Shriver also achieved clear majorities in Milwaukee, Dane, Ashland, Douglas and Portage Counties, and Rusk County by 1.1 points. Nixon won Manitowoc County by one hundred and ten votes, achieved pluralities in Pepin, Chippewa and Forest Counties, and won majorities in the remaining sixty-one – the largest being in Waupaca County where Nixon won by forty-two percentage points. Rusk County was one of six nationwide (outside of McGovern's home state of South Dakota) to flip Democratic from the previous election.

Nixon became the first Republican since Warren G. Harding in 1920 to win Iron County, and was the last Republican until Donald Trump in 2016 to win Pepin and Kenosha Counties, and remains the last Republican to claim Bayfield County.

== Primaries ==
=== Democratic ===
1972 Wisconsin Democratic Party presidential primary
- April 4, 1972

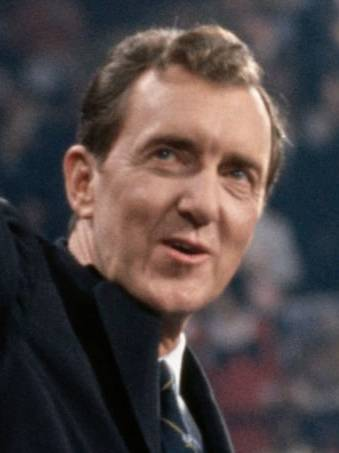

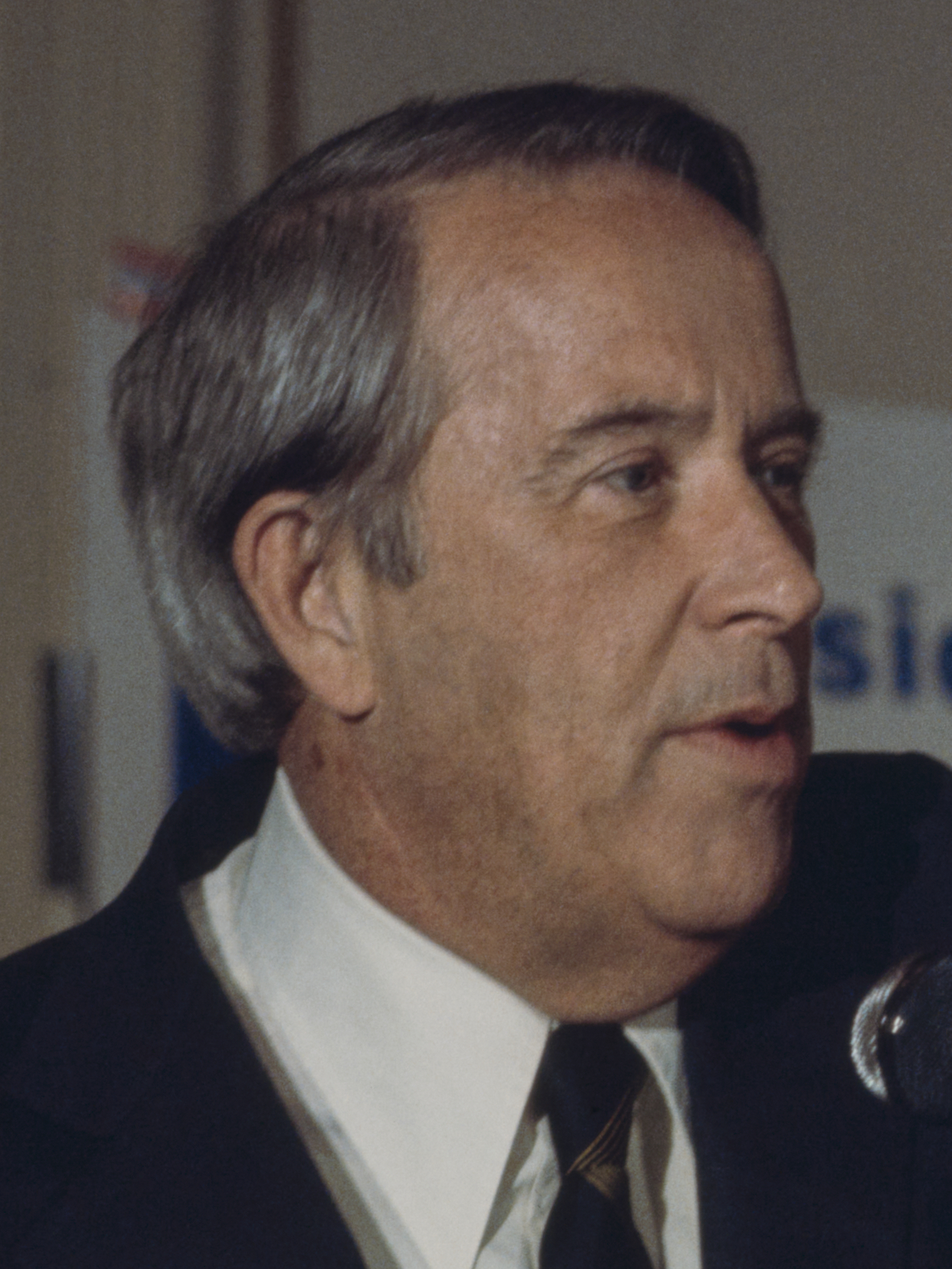

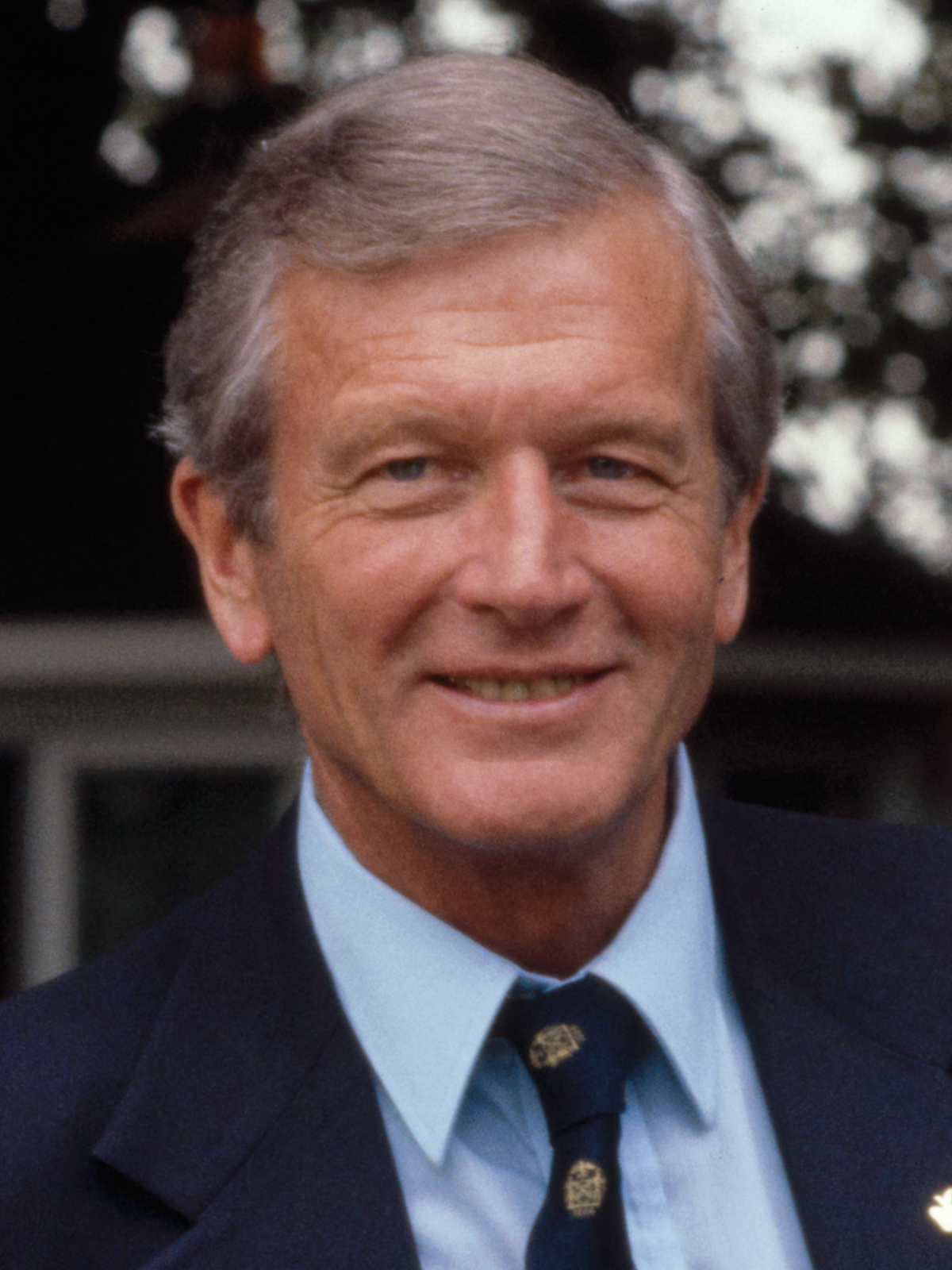
Candidate	George McGovern	George Wallace	Hubert Humphrey
Home state	South Dakota	Alabama	Minnesota
Popular vote	333,528	248,676	233,748
Percentage	29.55%	22.03%	20.71%
Candidate	Edmund Muskie	Henry M. Jackson	John Lindsay
Home state	Maine	Washington	New York
Popular vote	115,811	88,068	75,579
Percentage	10.26%	7.80%	6.70%
County Results
McGovern
20-30%
30-40%
40-50%
Wallace
20-30%
30-40%
40-50%
Humphrey
20-30%
30-40%

George McGovern defeated Alabama Governor, George Wallace, and previous Democratic nominee, Hubert Humphrey in the Wisconsin presidential primary on April 4, 1972

Democratic primary results
Party	Candidate	Votes	%
Democratic	George McGovern	333,528	29.55%
Democratic	George Wallace	248,676	22.03%
Democratic	Hubert H. Humphrey	233,748	20.71%
Democratic	Edmund S. Muskie	115,811	10.26%
Democratic	Henry M. Jackson	88,068	7.80%
Democratic	John Lindsay	75,579	6.70%
Democratic	Eugene McCarthy	15,543	1.38%
Democratic	Shirley Chisholm	9,198	0.82%
Democratic	None of the above	2,450	0.22%
Democratic	Sam Yorty	2,349	0.21%
Democratic	Patsy Mink	1,213	0.11%
Democratic	Wilbur Mills	913	0.08%
Democratic	Vance Hartke	766	0.07%
Democratic	Ted Kennedy (write-in)	183	0.02%
Democratic	Scattering (Note: Not listed directly in the Blue Book but can be obtained by subtracting the candidate totals from the statewide and county totals.)	559	0.05%
Total votes		1,128,584	100.00%

=== Republican ===
Incumbent president Richard Nixon easily defeated token opposition from Pete McCloskey and John M. Ashbrook.

Republican primary results
Party	Candidate	Votes	%
Republican	Richard Nixon	277,601	96.91%
Republican	Pete McCloskey	3,651	1.27%
Republican	John M. Ashbrook	2,604	0.91%
Republican	None of the above	2,315	0.81%
Republican	George Wallace (write-in)	46	0.02%
Republican	Scattering	227	0.08%
Total votes		286,444	100.00%

== Results ==
1972 United States presidential election in Wisconsin
Party	Candidate	Votes	Percentage	Electoral votes
Republican	Richard Nixon (incumbent)	989,430	53.40%	11
Democratic	George McGovern	810,174	43.72%	0
American	John G. Schmitz	47,525	2.56%	0
People's (Note: "Independent People's Party")	Benjamin Spock	2,701	0.15%	0
Socialist Labor (Note: "Independent Socialist Labor")	Louis Fisher	998	0.05%	0
Communist (Note: "Independent Communist Party USA")	Gus Hall	663	0.04%	0
Socialist Workers (Note: "Independent Socialist Workers")	Evelyn Reed	506	0.03%	0
Write-in	Scattering (Note: Not listed in the 1973 Blue Book, but are shown separately by county in the Board of Canvassers report)	893	0.05%	0
Totals		1,852,890	100.00%	11

=== Results by county ===
County	Richard Nixon Republican		George McGovern Democratic		John G. Schmitz American		Benjamin Spock People's		All Others Various		Margin		Total votes cast
County	#	%	#	%	#	%	#	%	#	%	#	%	Total votes cast
Adams	2,200	53.18%	1,833	44.31%	96	2.32%	3	0.07%	5	0.12%	367	8.87%	4,137
Ashland	3,478	46.91%	3,771	50.86%	135	1.82%	5	0.07%	25	0.34%	-293	-3.95%	7,414
Barron	8,418	59.89%	5,376	38.25%	211	1.50%	21	0.15%	29	0.21%	3,042	21.64%	14,055
Bayfield	3,045	51.79%	2,736	46.54%	74	1.26%	4	0.07%	20	0.34%	309	5.26%	5,879
Brown	37,101	56.49%	26,511	40.37%	1,907	2.90%	94	0.14%	62	0.09%	10,590	16.12%	65,675
Buffalo	3,079	54.28%	2,461	43.39%	110	1.94%	4	0.07%	18	0.32%	618	10.90%	5,672
Burnett	2,972	54.37%	2,389	43.71%	92	1.68%	8	0.15%	5	0.09%	583	10.66%	5,466
Calumet	6,446	55.85%	4,804	41.62%	243	2.11%	31	0.27%	18	0.16%	1,642	14.23%	11,542
Chippewa	8,451	49.35%	8,210	47.95%	416	2.43%	34	0.20%	12	0.07%	241	1.40%	17,123
Clark	7,138	56.47%	4,617	36.52%	859	6.80%	18	0.14%	9	0.07%	2,521	19.95%	12,641
Columbia	10,122	58.02%	7,083	40.60%	216	1.24%	11	0.06%	15	0.09%	3,039	17.42%	17,447
Crawford	3,705	58.67%	2,487	39.38%	115	1.82%	5	0.08%	3	0.05%	1,218	19.29%	6,315
Dane	56,020	40.84%	79,567	58.00%	1,040	0.76%	219	0.16%	331	0.24%	-23,547	-17.17%	137,177
Dodge	17,068	61.54%	9,898	35.69%	715	2.58%	29	0.10%	27	0.10%	7,170	25.85%	27,737
Door	6,503	64.25%	3,430	33.89%	167	1.65%	18	0.18%	3	0.03%	3,073	30.36%	10,121
Douglas	8,419	42.58%	11,054	55.91%	202	1.02%	36	0.18%	60	0.30%	-2,635	-13.33%	19,771
Dunn	6,660	53.00%	5,681	45.21%	185	1.47%	16	0.13%	23	0.18%	979	7.79%	12,565
Eau Claire	15,883	51.28%	14,300	46.17%	671	2.17%	57	0.18%	60	0.19%	1,583	5.11%	30,971
Florence	971	54.06%	757	42.15%	64	3.56%	1	0.06%	3	0.17%	214	11.91%	1,796
Fond du Lac	21,007	60.94%	12,050	34.96%	1,291	3.75%	55	0.16%	67	0.19%	8,957	25.98%	34,470
Forest	1,856	49.77%	1,678	45.00%	190	5.10%	4	0.11%	1	0.03%	178	4.77%	3,729
Grant	11,873	62.29%	6,915	36.28%	240	1.26%	15	0.08%	18	0.09%	4,958	26.01%	19,061
Green	7,422	66.14%	3,634	32.38%	145	1.29%	13	0.12%	8	0.07%	3,788	33.76%	11,222
Green Lake	5,046	67.67%	2,174	29.15%	227	3.04%	6	0.08%	4	0.05%	2,872	38.52%	7,457
Iowa	4,387	57.53%	3,131	41.06%	97	1.27%	7	0.09%	4	0.05%	1,256	16.47%	7,626
Iron	1,723	49.93%	1,648	47.75%	70	2.03%	5	0.14%	5	0.14%	75	2.18%	3,451
Jackson	3,937	60.79%	2,445	37.75%	84	1.30%	9	0.14%	1	0.02%	1,492	23.04%	6,476
Jefferson	14,621	59.32%	9,303	37.74%	611	2.48%	22	0.09%	91	0.37%	5,318	21.58%	24,648
Juneau	4,833	60.19%	2,943	36.65%	237	2.95%	7	0.09%	10	0.12%	1,890	23.54%	8,030
Kenosha	24,041	53.93%	19,441	43.61%	966	2.17%	66	0.15%	62	0.14%	4,600	10.32%	44,576
Kewaunee	4,802	57.15%	3,360	39.99%	229	2.73%	11	0.13%	1	0.01%	1,442	17.16%	8,403
La Crosse	21,992	63.29%	12,152	34.97%	541	1.56%	36	0.10%	25	0.07%	9,840	28.32%	34,746
Lafayette	4,898	62.91%	2,804	36.01%	73	0.94%	6	0.08%	5	0.06%	2,094	26.90%	7,786
Langlade	4,368	57.26%	3,011	39.47%	238	3.12%	6	0.08%	6	0.08%	1,357	17.79%	7,629
Lincoln	6,206	57.25%	4,175	38.51%	437	4.03%	11	0.10%	11	0.10%	2,031	18.74%	10,840
Manitowoc	16,599	48.48%	16,489	48.16%	1,070	3.13%	38	0.11%	41	0.12%	110	0.32%	34,237
Marathon	21,454	51.24%	18,500	44.18%	1,813	4.33%	42	0.10%	63	0.15%	2,954	7.05%	41,872
Marinette	8,740	57.36%	5,900	38.72%	537	3.52%	40	0.26%	21	0.14%	2,840	18.64%	15,238
Marquette	2,682	62.53%	1,537	35.84%	54	1.26%	6	0.14%	10	0.23%	1,145	26.70%	4,289
Menominee	355	36.37%	608	62.30%	11	1.13%	2	0.20%	0	0.00%	-253	-25.93%	976
Milwaukee	191,874	46.02%	210,802	50.55%	12,567	3.01%	724	0.17%	1,010	0.24%	-18,928	-4.54%	416,977
Monroe	7,625	66.68%	3,640	31.83%	149	1.30%	10	0.09%	12	0.10%	3,985	34.85%	11,436
Oconto	6,511	59.38%	4,041	36.85%	385	3.51%	13	0.12%	15	0.14%	2,470	22.53%	10,965
Oneida	6,811	58.83%	4,262	36.81%	471	4.07%	23	0.20%	10	0.09%	2,549	22.02%	11,577
Outagamie	27,533	59.80%	17,447	37.89%	896	1.95%	101	0.22%	67	0.15%	10,086	21.91%	46,044
Ozaukee	15,759	61.88%	8,503	33.39%	1,149	4.51%	20	0.08%	35	0.14%	7,256	28.49%	25,466
Pepin	1,458	49.21%	1,409	47.55%	86	2.90%	5	0.17%	5	0.17%	49	1.65%	2,963
Pierce	5,899	50.35%	5,611	47.89%	184	1.57%	10	0.09%	12	0.10%	288	2.46%	11,716
Polk	6,567	52.40%	5,738	45.78%	204	1.63%	11	0.09%	13	0.10%	829	6.62%	12,533
Portage	9,346	40.04%	13,564	58.11%	365	1.56%	46	0.20%	20	0.09%	-4,218	-18.07%	23,341
Price	3,694	54.39%	2,831	41.68%	250	3.68%	2	0.03%	15	0.22%	863	12.71%	6,792
Racine	38,490	56.41%	27,778	40.71%	1,785	2.62%	101	0.15%	82	0.12%	10,712	15.70%	68,236
Richland	5,062	66.14%	2,492	32.56%	90	1.18%	3	0.04%	7	0.09%	2,570	33.58%	7,654
Rock	30,361	58.03%	21,033	40.20%	823	1.57%	65	0.12%	37	0.07%	9,328	17.83%	52,319
Rusk	3,007	47.89%	3,075	48.97%	176	2.80%	10	0.16%	11	0.18%	-68	-1.08%	6,279
Sauk	10,285	58.70%	6,980	39.84%	204	1.16%	12	0.07%	41	0.23%	3,305	18.86%	17,522
Sawyer	3,081	62.52%	1,765	35.82%	72	1.46%	7	0.14%	3	0.06%	1,316	26.70%	4,928
Shawano	8,807	66.95%	3,940	29.95%	378	2.87%	7	0.05%	22	0.17%	4,867	37.00%	13,154
Sheboygan	21,500	49.38%	21,114	48.50%	779	1.79%	81	0.19%	63	0.14%	386	0.89%	43,537
St. Croix	8,553	52.50%	7,488	45.96%	213	1.31%	21	0.13%	16	0.10%	1,065	6.54%	16,291
Taylor	4,125	55.76%	2,934	39.66%	313	4.23%	4	0.05%	22	0.30%	1,191	16.10%	7,398
Trempealeau	5,723	56.69%	4,232	41.92%	126	1.25%	4	0.04%	10	0.10%	1,491	14.77%	10,095
Vernon	6,836	65.71%	3,407	32.75%	127	1.22%	10	0.10%	23	0.22%	3,429	32.96%	10,403
Vilas	4,422	65.92%	1,907	28.43%	366	5.46%	4	0.06%	9	0.13%	2,515	37.49%	6,708
Walworth	17,823	65.95%	8,598	31.82%	485	1.79%	38	0.14%	79	0.29%	9,225	34.14%	27,023
Washburn	3,220	56.84%	2,336	41.24%	96	1.69%	6	0.11%	7	0.12%	884	15.60%	5,665
Washington	15,338	56.76%	10,434	38.61%	1,161	4.30%	45	0.17%	46	0.17%	4,904	18.15%	27,024
Waukesha	59,399	60.85%	34,573	35.42%	3,404	3.49%	151	0.15%	95	0.10%	24,826	25.43%	97,622
Waupaca	11,040	70.07%	4,418	28.04%	257	1.63%	20	0.13%	20	0.13%	6,622	42.03%	15,755
Waushara	4,466	66.27%	2,094	31.07%	166	2.46%	8	0.12%	5	0.07%	2,372	35.20%	6,739
Winnebago	29,488	57.28%	20,450	39.72%	1,400	2.72%	93	0.18%	51	0.10%	9,038	17.56%	51,482
Wood	14,806	54.88%	10,415	38.60%	1,719	6.37%	25	0.09%	15	0.06%	4,391	16.28%	26,980
Totals	989,430	53.40%	810,174	43.72%	47,525	2.56%	2,701	0.15%	3,060	0.17%	179,256	9.67%	1,852,890

=== Electors ===
These were the names of the electors on each ticket.

Richard M. Nixon & Spiro Agnew Republican Party	George McGovern & Sargent Shriver Democratic Party	John G. Schmitz & Thomas J. Anderson American Party
Harold V. Froelich; Robert Warren; Merrill Stalbaum; Esther Doughty Luckhardt; Elaine Yerly; James C. Devitt; David Sullivan; Ernest Keppler; Daniel Theo; Gerald Lorge; Byron Wackett	Patrick J. Lucey; Martin Schreiber; Arnold Goodman; Charles P. Smith; Harvey L. Dueholm; Roger Szymanski; Ray Majerus; Anthony Werner; Mrs. Milton Schneider; Larry Longley; Jeanette Swed	John Couture; Joseph Birkenstock; Robert Morgan; Karl E. Koehler; Keith Ellison; John Zierhut; Earl Denny; Harvey Raidy; R. David Pennings; Edward Duquaine; David Beirle

Benjamin Spock & Julius Hobson People's Party	Louis Fisher & Genevieve Gunderson Socialist Labor Party	Gus Hall & Jarvis Tyner Communist Party	Evelyn Reed & Clifton DeBerry Socialist Workers Party
James E. Bouton; Rohn F. Webb; Dale E. Najdowski; Elizabeth Boardman; David Webb; Richard Crawford; John Gnewuch; Gene J. Shermeister; Pope Wright; Lester Sieglaff; Daniel D. Olson	Louis Fisher; Genevieve Gunderson; Martin Tobert; Henry A. Ochsner; C. James Matuschka; Arthur Wepfer; Adolf Wiggert; Alfred Teichert; Clarence Wardall; Anton Jonas; Carol Cozzini	Eino Maatta; Lucille Berrien; Alex Regis Broeske; Marianne Rice; Irene Zvaigznitis; John G. Repensek; Mary E. Blair; Ida Gudex; Joe A. Lima; Lillian Rahkonen; Ernst Ave Lallemont	Patrick M. Quinn; Martha M. Quinn; John P. Holton; Gregory Spicer; Susan E. James; Sam K. Hunt; Walter L. Chesser; Douglas G. Zoerb; Mark E. Kiland; Linda T. Montello; Thomas T. Tank

== See also ==
- United States presidential elections in Wisconsin
