= Robert Briffault =

Anthropologist & novelist (1874–1948)

Robert Stephen Briffault MC* ([ʁo.ˈbɛʁ stə.ˈfɑ̃ bʁi.ˈfo], 1874 – 11 December 1948) was a French surgeon who found fame as a social anthropologist and later in life as a novelist.

== Biography ==
Briffault was born in either France or London, on 8 November 1874, the son of a French diplomat, Charles Frédéric Briffault, and the Scottish Margaret Mann (née Stewart). He later cited his year of birth as 1876, likely to be young enough to enter the army in the First World War.

He married Anna Clarke in 1896, with whom he had three children. After her death in 1919, he married Herma Hoyt (1898–1981), an American writer and translator.

=== Medical practice ===
He spent time in France and elsewhere in Europe following his father. After the death of his father in 1887, Briffault and his mother moved to New Zealand. Briffault received his MB and ChB from the University of Otago in New Zealand and commenced medical practice.

=== War service ===
Briffault served on the Western Front and at Gallipoli during WWI. He was served within the British Expeditionary Force as part of the Royal Army Medical Corps from mid 1915. He was awarded the Military Cross for his service.

Dr Briffault was a member of the Auckland Institute and Museum between the 1890s to 1920. During 1909-1910, he served as president and then in 1911-1912 as Vice-president of the Auckland Institute and Museum.

=== Later life & death ===
Briffault settled in England where he turned to the study of sociology and anthropology. He also lived for some time in the USA, and later Paris.He died in Hastings, Sussex, England on 11 December 1948.

Briffault debated the institution of marriage with Bronisław Malinowski in the 1930s and corresponded with Bertrand Russell.

When asked how to pronounce his name, Briffault told The Literary Digest: "Should be pronounced bree'-foh, without attempting to give it a French pronunciation."

== Briffault's law ==
Briffault is known for what is called Briffault's law:

The female, not the male, determines all the conditions of the animal family. Where the female can derive no benefit from association with the male, no such association takes place. — Robert Briffault, The Mothers. Vol. I, p. 191

Briffault clarifies that this rule applies only to nonhuman animals, and not to humans: “There is, in fact, no analogy between the animal family and the patriarchal human family. The former is entirely the product of the female’s instincts, and she, not the male, is the head.” In the chapter where Briffault outlines his law, he applies it to tigers, elks, lions, zebras, gazelles, buffaloes, deer, monkeys, beavers, lions, birds and other animals, and only references humans briefly in order to contrast human behavioural patterns from those of animals:

“There is in fact no analogy between that [animal] group and the patriarchal human family; to equate the two is a proceeding for which there is no justification. The patriarchal family in the form in which it exists today is a juridic institution. Whatever external and superficial similarities there may be in the constitution of the human and of the animal family, there is one profound and fundamental difference. The patriarchal family is founded upon the supremacy of the male as ‘pater familias,’ as head of the family. This is not the case in the animal family. it is, on the contrary, entirely the product and manifestation of the female’s instincts; she, and not the male, is its head. We may occasionally find the male employed in foraging for the brood and for the mother, while the latter is lying quiescent in charge of her eggs or brood; but there is nothing in those appearances to justify us in regarding the animal family as patriarchal; on the contrary, the conduct of the group is entirely determined not by the male but by the female.”

== Commentary on works ==
In 1930, H. L. Mencken wrote the following in his Treatise on the Gods:

Primitive society, like many savage societies of our own time, was probably strictly matriarchal. The mother was the head of the family. ...What masculine authority there was resided in the mother's brother. He was the man of the family, and to him the children yielded respect and obedience. Their father, at best, was simply a pleasant friend who fed them and played with them; at worst, he was an indecent loafer who sponged on the mother. They belonged, not to his family, but to their mother's. As they grew up they joined their uncle's group of hunters, not their father's. This matriarchal organisation of the primitive tribe, though it finds obvious evidential support in the habits of higher animals, has been questioned by many anthropologists, but of late one of them, Briffault, demonstrated its high probability in three immense volumes [The Mothers: A Study of the Origins of Sentiments and Institutions]. It is hard to escape the cogency of his arguments, for they are based upon an almost overwhelming accumulation of facts. They not only show that, in what we may plausibly assume about the institutions of early man and in what we know positively about the institutions of savages today, the concepts inseparable from a matriarchate colour every custom and every idea: they show also that those primeval concepts still condition our own ways of thinking and doing things, so that "the societal characters of the human mind" all seem to go back "to the functions of the female and not to those of the male." Thus it appears that man, in his remote infancy, was by no means the lord of creation that he has since become."

== Works ==
=== Non-fiction ===
- The Making of Humanity (1919)
- Psyche's Lamp: A Re-evaluation of Psychological Principles as a Foundation of All Thought (1921)
- The Mothers: A Study of the Origins of Sentiments and Institutions, Vol. II, Vol. III, (1927)
  - "Group-Marriage and Sex Communism." In V. F. Calverton, ed., The Making of Man, The Modern Library, 1931.
  - "The Origin of Love." In V. F. Calverton, ed., The Making of Man, The Modern Library, 1931.
- Rational Evolution (1930)
- Sin and Sex (1931)
- Breakdown: The Collapse of Traditional Civilization (1932)
- Reasons for Anger: Selected Essays (1937)
- The Decline and Fall of the British Empire (1938)
- Marriage Past and Present (1956) edited radio debate between Briffault and Bronislaw Malinowski, originally published as a series in The Listener
- Les Troubadours et le Sentiment Romanesque (1945)
  - The Troubadours (1965)

=== Fiction ===
- Europa: A Novel of the Days of Ignorance (1935)
  - "Europa." In Modern Women in Love: Sixty Twentieth-century Masterpieces of Fiction, The Dryden Press, 1945.
- Europa in Limbo (1937)
- The Ambassadress (1939)
- Fandango (1940)
- New Life of Mr. Martin (1947)

=== Articles ===
- "The Downfall of Old Europe," Part II, The English Review, February/March 1920.
- "Nemesis," The English Review, October 1920.
- "We," The English Review, November 1920.
- “Aristocracy,” The English Review, December 1920.
- "Inpersonality," The English Review, May 1921.
- "The Wail of Grub Street," The English Review, July 1921.
- "Will Monogamy Die Out?" In Ernest R. Groves and Lee M. Brooks, ed., Readings in the Family, J. B. Lippincott Company, 1934.

=== Other ===
- "Birth Customs." In Edwin R. A. Seligman, ed., Encyclopedia of the Social Sciences, Vol. II, The Macmillan Company, 1930.
