= Michel Siffre =

French scientist (1939–2024)

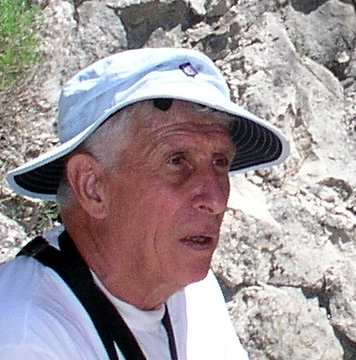
- Siffre in 2009
- Born: 3 January 1939; Nice, France
- Died: 25 August 2024 (aged 85); Nice, France
- Education: Sorbonne (DES)
- Occupation: Speleologist

Michel Augustin Francis Siffre (French: [sifʁ]; 3 January 1939 – 25 August 2024) was a French geologist, speleologist and underground explorer. He is especially known for the chronobiology experiments he conducted on himself.

== Early life, family and education ==
Siffre was born and raised in Nice, France. His parents were Jean and Lucie (Roques) Siffre.

He earned a degree in geology in 1960 at the Sorbonne.

== Career ==
Siffre founded the Institut français de spéléologie (French Institute of Speleology) (Note: Not to be confused with the French Federation of Speleology) in 1962.

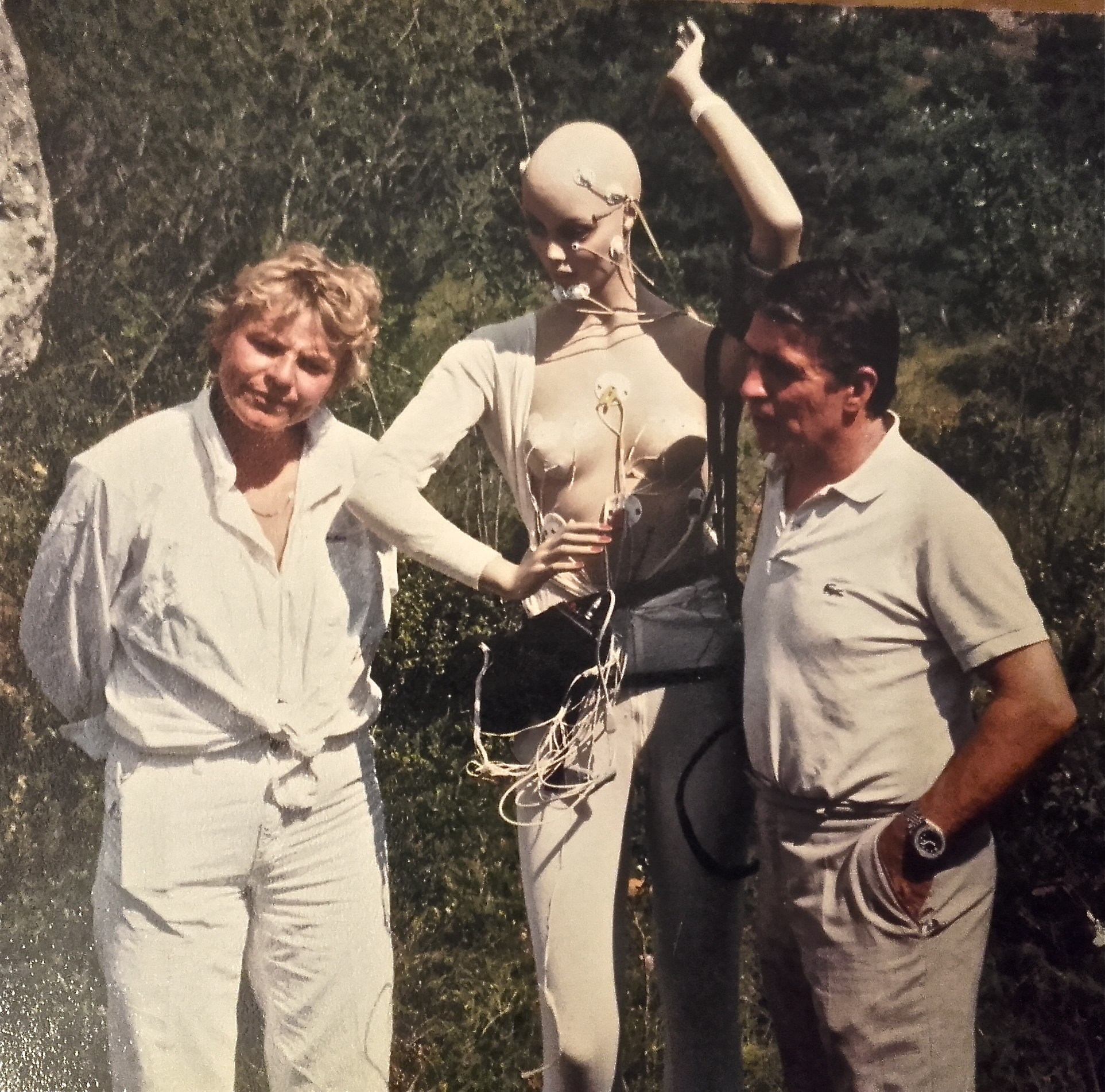
Véronique Le Guen and Michel Siffre

Initially, Siffre was planning to study a newly discovered glacier 70 km (43 mi) from Nice by remaining within it for 15 days. However, inspired by the space race, he extended the duration and examined how humans experience time by spending 62 or 63 days without time cues, cloistered 130 m (430 ft) below the surface in the abyss of Scarasson (Punta Marguareis) in the Maritime Alps between France and Italy. beginning July 1962. Subsequently, he designed or organized over a dozen underground experiments for other speleologists.

In 1972, Siffre performed a more extensive underground experiment, staying six months in Midnight Cave in southern Texas. After the experiment, he concluded that without time cues, he adjusted to a 48-hour rather than a 24-hour cycle. NASA studied his work, (Note: Several astronauts reported experiences similar to those experienced in underground experiments such as loss of short-term memory to being isolated from external time references.) as did the French Army and the US government.

He conducted geology work in Sri Lanka and Guatemala, and he wrote books and delivered lectures about caves.

Siffre underwent an additional cave excursion from November 1999 to February 2000. He celebrated the New Year there, but missed the actual date by three days.

== Personal life and death ==
After his 1972 experiment, Siffre suffered both acute and lasting effects, recovering from the isolation physically, mentally and emotionally only partially. In debt from the experiment's significant costs (even though some of it was paid through government funding), Siffre and his wife Nathalie divorced.

Siffre died from pneumonia at age 85 in Nice on 25 August 2024.

== Publications ==
- Hors du temps. L'expérience du 16 juillet 1962 au fond du gouffre de Scarasson par celui qui l'a vécue, Julliard, 1963
- Des merveilles sous la terre, Hachette, cop. 1976
- Stalactites, stalagmites, cop. 1984
- L'or des gouffres: découvertes dans les jungles mayas, Flammarion, 1979
- Dans les abîmes de la terre, Flammarion, 1975
- La France des grottes et cavernes, Privat, 1999
- A la recherche de l'art des cavernes du pays Maya, A. Lefeuvre, 1979
- Découvertes dans les grottes mayas, Arthaud, 1993
- Beyond Time, translated by Herma Briffault, McGraw-Hill, New York, 1964

== See also ==
- Chronobiology
- Circadian rhythm
- Maurizio Montalbini
