= All-American Girl: The Mary Kay Letourneau Story =

2000 television film by Lloyd Kramer

- Promotional poster
- Genre: Crime; Drama
- Written by: Julie Hébert
- Directed by: Lloyd Kramer
- Starring: Penelope Ann Miller; Mercedes Ruehl; Omar Anguiano; Rena Owen
- Music by: Howard Aye; Domenic Troiano
- Country of origin: United States
- Original language: English

Production
- Executive producers: Sonny Grosso; Larry Jacobson
- Producer: J. Miles Dale
- Production location: Toronto
- Cinematography: Brian R.R. Hebb
- Editor: David Hicks
- Running time: 120 minutes
- Production company: Grosso-Jacobson Productions

Original release
- Network: USA Network
- Release: January 18, 2000

All-American Girl: The Mary Kay Letourneau Story is a 2000 American biographical crime drama television film based on Mary Kay Letourneau's repeated sexual abuse of her sixth-grade student Vili Fualaau. The film premiered on USA Network on January 18, 2000, and was followed with a special entitled Letourneau: Live, which featured interviews with Letourneau and others involved with the scenario.

The lead role of Letourneau was played by actress Penelope Ann Miller and filming took place in Toronto during 1999. Letourneau cooperated with the film's producers. As she could not receive profits from the film per the "Son of Sam law", her fees were placed in a trust fund for her children. As a way of developing her role, Miller corresponded with Letourneau over the telephone.

== Cast ==
- Penelope Ann Miller as Mary Kay Letourneau
  - Kristen Campbell Edwards as Young Mary Kay Schmitz
- Omar Anguiano as Vili Fualaau
- Mercedes Ruehl as Jane Newhall
- Rena Owen as Soona Fualaau
- Greg Spottiswood as Steve Letourneau
- Christopher Bondy as John Schmitz
- Janet-Laine Green as Mary Schmitz
- Gary Hudson as Charles Dunphy
- Robert Clark as Steven Letourneau Jr.
- Lori Hallier as Jan Griffin
- Julie Khaner as Det. Coughlin
- Philip Akin as Det. Albany
- Nadia Capone as Susan Trenton
- Cody Jones as Joseph E. Schmitz
- Rikki Klieman as Reporter
- Karen Robinson as Karen

== Reception ==
Critical reception for All-American Girl was mixed. Charleston Daily Mail praised the film, writing, "More than just a tawdry detour into the Jerry Springer/Ricki Lake cesspool of shock value, this film presents a sympathetic look at a confused woman who still contends that Vili is her destined soulmate, the love of her life." The Los Angeles Daily News was more mixed in their review, praising the filmmakers for putting "a little care and thought into their production" and that it did not "waste one's time or aggressively insult one's intelligence" while also stating that the film was "ultimately unsatisfying" and did not "provide much insight into the case". Variety panned the film overall, writing that it "wastes a good opportunity to shed light on some really screwed up people. Despite Penelope Ann Miller's eerie resemblance to Seattle's infamous seductress, this factual telepic about the world's most 'giving' teacher offers little insight and is buried underneath overblown production values."

== See also ==
- 2000 in American television
