= List of teachers who married their students =

This is a list of notable teachers who married their students.

- Peter Abélard married Héloïse d'Argenteuil
- Jackie Battley married future U.S. House Speaker Newt Gingrich (1962)
- Abhijit Banerjee, economist, had children with and later married economist Esther Duflo, and they later jointly won the Nobel Memorial Prize in Economic Sciences together.
- Yale University Egyptology professor John Coleman Darnell married his student Colleen Darnell.
- Charles Melville Dewey married Julia Henshaw
- Abigail Fillmore married Millard Fillmore, a future President of the United States.
- James Earle Fraser married Laura Gardin Fraser (1913)
- Robert Henri was twice married to students of his, Linda Craige (1898) and Marjorie Organ (1908)
- Walter Kerr married Jean Kerr in 1943.
- Aliza Kezeradze married Ivo Pogorelić in 1980.
- Mary Kay Letourneau married Vili Fualaau in 2005.
- Arthur Frank Mathews married Lucia Kleinhans.
- Sarah Jones married student Cody York in 2014.
- Olivier Messiaen married Yvonne Loriod.
- Brigitte Trogneux married her former high school student Emmanuel Macron, who later became President of France, in 2007.
