= Latorno =

Latorno is a surname. Notable people with the surname include:

- Mary Kay Latorno (1962–2020), American teacher
- Alex Latorno, character in 8 Mile (film)
