= Joseph E. Schmitz =

American lawyer (born 1956)

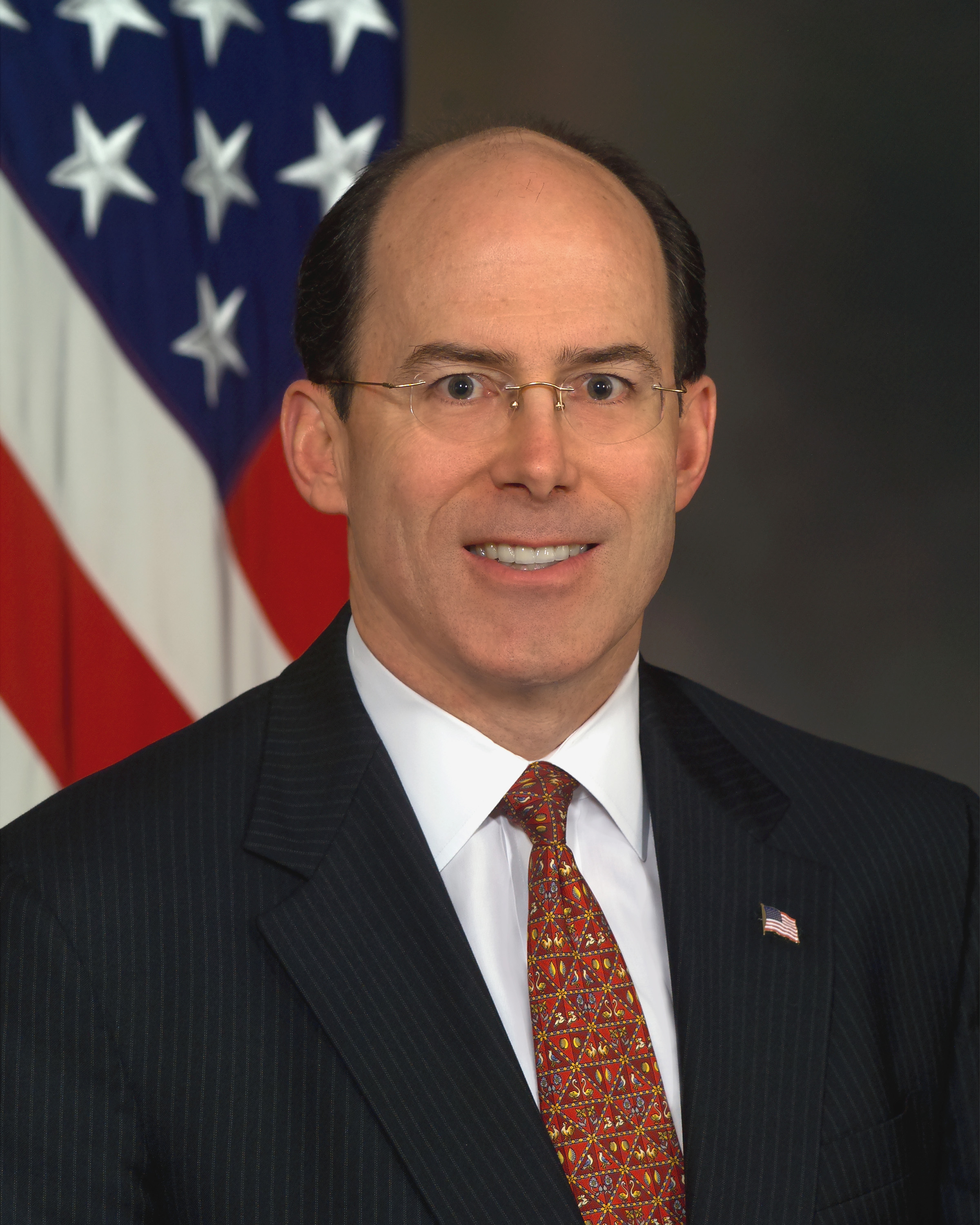

Inspector General of the Department of Defense
- In office April 2, 2002 – September 12, 2005
- President: George W. Bush
- Preceded by: Robert Lieberman (Acting)
- Succeeded by: Thomas Gimble (Acting)

Personal details
- Born: Joseph Edward Schmitz; August 28, 1956 (age 70) Milwaukee, Wisconsin, U.S.
- Party: Republican
- Parent(s): John G. Schmitz (father); Mary E. Suehr (mother)
- Relatives: John P. Schmitz (brother); Mary Kay Letourneau (sister)
- Education: United States Naval Academy (BS); Stanford University (JD)

Military service
- Allegiance: United States
- Branch/service: United States Navy

Joseph Edward Schmitz (born August 28, 1956) is an American lawyer, former inspector general of the United States Department of Defense and a former executive with Blackwater Worldwide. After working as a watchdog at the Pentagon for three and a half years, Schmitz resigned to return to the private sector. Although allegations questioning his stewardship of the inspector general's office surfaced nine months after his resignation, a high-level review board, the President's Council on Integrity and Efficiency, cleared him of wrongdoing in 2006. He was named one of Donald Trump's foreign policy advisors for his 2016 presidential campaign.

== Biography ==
Schmitz was born in Milwaukee, Wisconsin, the son of John G. Schmitz, former California State Senator, member of the U.S. House of Representatives, and U.S. presidential candidate in 1972. Schmitz attended Catholic schools as a child, and Georgetown Preparatory School for high school, a time period in which his father also served in Congress. He holds a Bachelor of Science (1978) from the United States Naval Academy in Annapolis, Maryland, where he was on the wrestling team, and a Juris Doctor (1986) from Stanford University. He was one of seven children in his family.

Upon graduation from the Naval Academy, Schmitz served in the U.S. Navy for approximately four years, including a stint as an exchange officer with the German Navy. After leaving active duty, Schmitz went to law school, and was in the Naval Reserve until 2001. He clerked with James L. Buckley, circuit judge for the D.C. Circuit Court, and was a special assistant to Attorney General Edwin Meese III during the Reagan Administration. Schmitz entered the private sector in 1987, eventually joining the Patton Boggs law firm in Washington, D.C. He was also an adjunct professor of law at Georgetown University in the 1990s, and founded his own firm, Joseph E. Schmitz, PLLC, in 2008.

Schmitz is a member of the Sovereign Military Order of Malta.

He co-authored the book Shariah: The Threat To America by the Center for Security Policy, of which he is a senior fellow, and has been on the Advisory Board of the American Freedom Law Center, which is run by David Yerushalmi. Because of his involvement with these groups, he has been described as anti-Muslim by the Southern Poverty Law Center and Hope not Hate.

== Inspector General of the Department of Defense ==
On June 18, 2001, Schmitz was nominated by President George W. Bush to act as the Inspector General of the Department of Defense. His nomination was held up in the Senate Armed Services Committee for unknown reasons until March 21, 2002, when he was confirmed by the full Senate by voice vote. One of his first actions as Inspector General was to hire controversial Republican operative L. Jean Lewis as his chief of staff.

Various senior officials in the Defense Department stated that Schmitz had an enduring fascination with Baron Friedrich Wilhelm von Steuben, having personally redesigned the Defense Department Inspector General's seal to incorporate the Von Steuben family motto. Schmitz's association with the German journalist, Henning Von Steuben, the leader of the Von Steuben Family Association, attracted the criticism of Senator Chuck Grassley, who stated that Schmitz had "feted Von Steuben at an $800 meal allegedly paid for by public funds." In 2005, Schmitz canceled a planned $200,000 trip to Germany "to attend a ceremony at a Von Steuben statue," after Grassley questioned the expenditure.

As Inspector General, Schmitz investigated involvement of the U.S. military in the sex trade in South Korea, Bosnia, and Kosovo.

== Role in 2020 Presidential Election ==
CNN reported that Schmitz sent a message to Representative Jim Jordan describing the legal basis for Vice President Mike Pence to block certification of the 2020 election. On January 5, 2021, Jordan forwarded Schmitz’ message to White House Chief of Staff Mark Meadows.

== See also ==
- Blackwater Worldwide
- Janet Rehnquist, former Inspector General of the Department of Health and Human Services
- Scott Bloch, United States Office of Special Counsel
- Robert W. Cobb, NASA Inspector General
- Howard Krongard, Inspector General of the United States Department of State
- Erik Prince, founder and CEO of Blackwater Worldwide, Inc.

== Literature ==
- Miller, T. Christian. (2006). Blood Money: Wasted Billions, Lost Lives, and Corporate Greed in Iraq. New York: Little, Brown and Company. See pages 68–69.
- Scahill, Jeremy. (2007). Blackwater: The Rise of the World's Most Powerful Mercenary Army. New York: Nation Books. See Chapter Seventeen: "Joseph Schmitz: Christian Soldier."
