= Larry H. Abraham =

American businessman and author

- Born: Larry Henry Abraham; October 29, 1937; Washington state, United States
- Died: July 7, 2008 (aged 70); Pierce County, Washington, United States
- Occupation: Political theorist

Larry Henry Abraham (October 29, 1937 – July 7, 2008) was an American businessman and author. He was the co-founder of PanAmerica Capital Group, Inc., and a speaker on political, economic, and financial topics. He was a member of Robert W. Welch, Jr.'s John Birch Society. He was the co-author with Gary Allen of the 1971 best-seller None Dare Call It Conspiracy, which sold more than five million copies during the 1972 U.S. presidential election. His obituary says he spent most of his life in the conservative movement.

== Selected works ==
Books

- None Dare Call It Conspiracy, with Gary Allen. Seal Beach, Calif.: Concord Press (1972). Introduction by Congressman John G. Schmitz.
- Call It Conspiracy. Seattle, Wash.: Double A. Publications (1985). Prologue by Gary North, Ph.D. ISBN 978-0961555009.

Update to None Dare Call It Conspiracy.

- The Greening: The Environmentalists' Drive for Global Power, with Franklin Sanders. Phoenix, Ariz.: Double A Publications (1993). ISBN 978-0962664625. OCLC 29025804.

Book contributions

- Prologue to New Lies for Old: The Communist Strategy for Deception and Disinformation, by Anatoliy Golitsyn. New York: Dodd, Mead (1985), pp. iv-xvi. ISBN 978-0396081944.

Newsletters

- The G.E.O. Report
- Larry Abraham's Insider Report

Filmography

- Countdown to the New World Order (1990).

Interview with Wallis W. Wood.
