= Mike Allen (journalist) =

American political journalist (born 1964)

Michael Allen
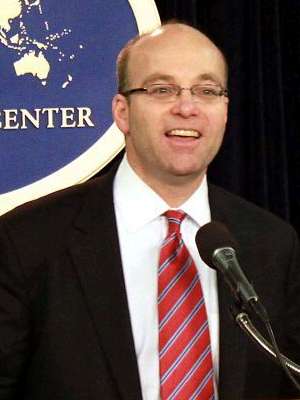
- Allen in 2010
- Born: June 21, 1964 (age 62); United States
- Education: Washington and Lee University (BA)
- Occupations: Political reporter, writer, journalist
- Relatives: Gary Allen (father)

Michael Allen (born June 21, 1964) is an American political journalist. He is the co-founder and executive editor of Axios and the former chief political reporter for Politico. While at Politico, he wrote the daily Playbook; in April 2010, in reference to his frequent correspondence with White House communications director Dan Pfeiffer, The New York Times called him "The Man The White House Wakes Up To." Prior to joining Politico for its 2007 launch, he worked at numerous other publications, including The New York Times and Time.

The New York Times reported that Allen would no longer be writing the Playbook after July 11, 2016. The writing was taken over by Politico staffers Daniel Lippman, Anna Palmer, and Jake Sherman.

== Early life ==
Allen grew up in Orange County, California. His father was conservative writer Gary Allen, a spokesman for the John Birch Society. He described his household as normal and "apolitical", in considerable contrast to his father's flamboyant public persona as a conservative icon, who once denounced rock music as a "Pavlovian Communist mind-control plot" and wrote speeches for George Wallace. Allen is an Eagle Scout.

Allen moved east to attend Washington and Lee University, graduating in 1986 with a double major in politics and journalism. His father died the same year, and Allen was quoted in the New York Times obituary giving details on his father's career.

== Career ==
Allen's first reporting job was with the Fredericksburg Free Lance-Star. He also worked at the Richmond Times-Dispatch, The Washington Post, The New York Times and Time.

At Politico, a Washington-based print and online publication launched by Allbritton Communications, Allen wrote the daily "Playbook." In April 2010, The New York Times estimated that Playbook brings in $780,000 for Politico.

Allen was featured in a piece for the April 25, 2010, edition of The New York Times Magazine titled, "The Man the White House Wakes Up To." He is considered by many to be one of the most powerful and influential journalists in Washington.

== Reception ==
Allen has attracted criticism for focusing coverage on superficial aspects of politics and of the culture of Washington, D.C. In November 2013, Erik Wemple wrote an oped in The Washington Post alleging that Allen gave favorable Politico coverage in return for advertising dollars. Allen has refused to publicly comment. Jonathan Chait described Politico's response as "evasive tripe". Writing in Salon, Alex Pareene described his work as "indistinguishable from a paid advocate for business interests."

In 2004, Allen won the White House Correspondents' Association's Merriman Smith Memorial Award for outstanding presidential coverage on deadline. The award was given to Allen for his reporting of President George W. Bush's secret trip to Baghdad, Iraq.

== Personal life ==
A somewhat reclusive figure, Allen was profiled by Mark Leibovich, who reported that many of his friends did not know where he lived, and that none of them had ever been inside his apartment. A colleague who knew him in earlier life described him as living among "mounds of newspapers and a couple pieces of junky furniture."
