= Dennis Carpenter =

American politician

Dennis E. Carpenter
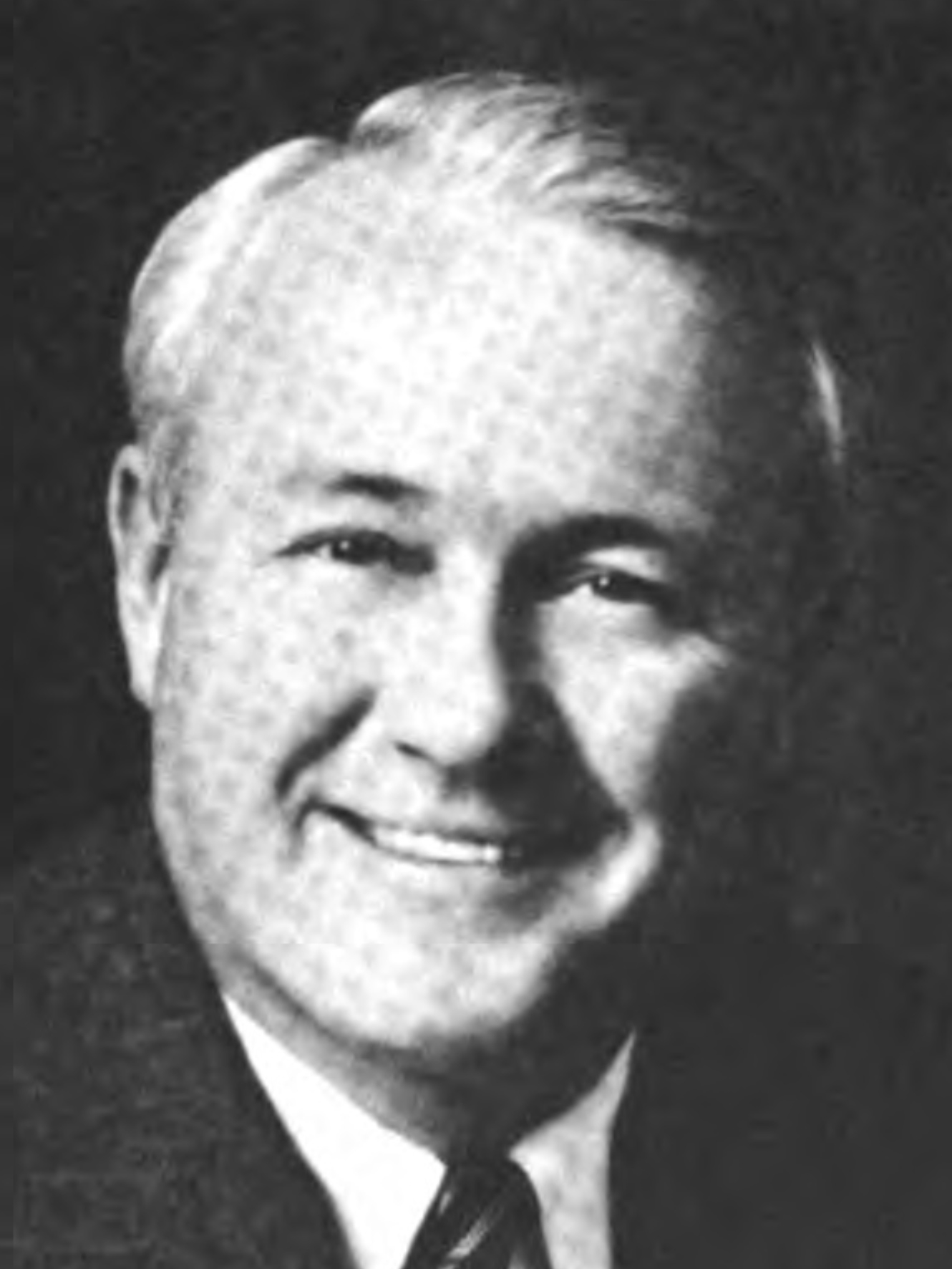
- Official portrait, 1975

Member of the California Senate from the 36th district
- In office December 2, 1974 – November 30, 1978
- Preceded by: W. Craig Biddle
- Succeeded by: John G. Schmitz

Member of the California Senate from the 34th district
- In office August 21, 1970 – November 30, 1974
- Preceded by: John G. Schmitz
- Succeeded by: Robert B. Presley

Personal details
- Born: September 3, 1928 Minneapolis, Minnesota, U.S.
- Died: December 23, 2003 (aged 75) Tulsa, Oklahoma, U.S.
- Party: Republican
- Spouse: Madine Waltrip (m. 1968, divorced) Aleta Anderson (m. 1981, divorced)
- Children: 5
- Education: UCLA

Military service
- Branch/service: United States Army

Dennis Eugene Carpenter (September 3, 1928 – December 23, 2003) was an American politician, Republican member of the California State Senate from 1970 until 1978 and attorney at law. Carpenter was a Federal Bureau of Investigation special agent from 1955 until 1958. The Carpenter papers are archived at the University of California, Irvine.
