= James B. Utt =

American politician (1899–1970)

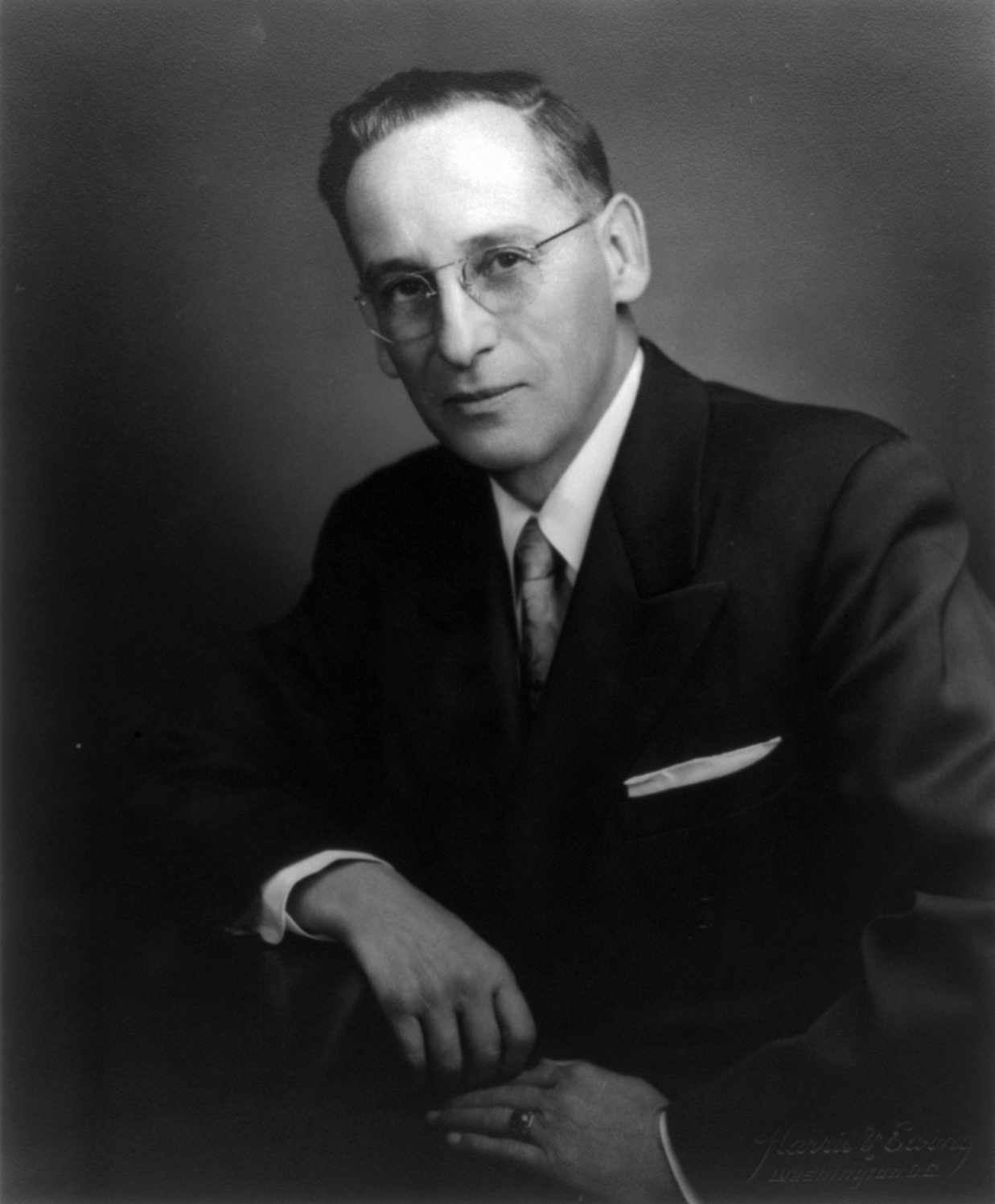
- Portrait by Harris & Ewing, c. 1950s

Member of the U.S. House of Representatives from California
- In office January 3, 1953 – March 1, 1970
- Preceded by: New seat
- Succeeded by: John G. Schmitz
- Constituency: 28th district (1953–1963); 35th district (1963–1970)

Member of the California State Assembly from the 74th district
- In office January 2, 1933 – January 4, 1937
- Preceded by: Archibald E. Brock
- Succeeded by: Clyde A. Watson

Personal details
- Born: James Boyd Utt; March 11, 1899 Tustin, California, U.S.
- Died: March 1, 1970 (aged 70) Bethesda, Maryland, U.S.
- Resting place: Santa Ana Cemetery in Santa Ana, California
- Party: Republican
- Education: University of Southern California (BA, JD)
- Occupation: Politician; lawyer

James Boyd Utt (March 11, 1899 – March 1, 1970) was an American lawyer and politician. A Republican from Orange County, California, he served in the United States House of Representatives from 1953 until his death from a heart attack in 1970.

== Early life and education ==
Utt was born in Tustin in Orange County. He attended public schools and Santa Ana Junior College. He worked in citrus processing, served in the California State Assembly from 1933 to 1937, and was an inheritance tax appraiser in the state controller's office during 1936 to 1952.

In 1946, at the age of forty-seven, Utt graduated from the University of Southern California Law School, was admitted to the bar the next year, and practised law in Santa Ana.

== Congress ==
In 1952, Utt was first elected to the 83rd Congress. He polled 106,972 votes (63%) against the Democrat Lionel Van Deerlin, who drew 62,779 votes (37%). Utt had no serious challengers in what became an increasingly "safe" seat for him. For instance, in the heavily Democratic year of 1958, he polled 152,855 votes (58%) to Democrat T. R. Boyett's 109,794 votes (42%).

In 1962, when Richard M. Nixon lost the governorship to incumbent Democrat Edmund G. "Pat" Brown, Sr., Utt won reelection with 133,737 (68.5%) to Democrat Burton Shamsky's 61,393 (31.5%). In the wake of Barry Goldwater's landslide defeat in 1964, Utt still polled 65 percent in his district. In 1966, when Ronald W. Reagan blocked a third term for "Pat" Brown, Utt received 73.1 percent in his district (his strongest showing ever). In 1968, when Nixon was elected president, Utt drew a similar vote of 72.5%. That turned out to be his last election, for he died in office before completing the 1969–1971 term.

=== Conservatism ===
One of the most right-wing members in the House of Representatives from his beginning in 1953 to his death in 1970, Utt opposed welfare programs provided by the federal government, likening them to a "child molester who offers candy before his evil act".

Utt voted against the Civil Rights Acts of 1960, 1964, and 1968, and the Voting Rights Act of 1965, but did not vote on the Civil Rights Act of 1957 and abstained from voting on the 24th Amendment to the U.S. Constitution.

Utt had a penchant for conspiracy theories, claiming in 1963 that "a large contingent of barefooted Africans" might be training in Georgia as part of a United Nations military exercise to take over the United States. That same year, he also claimed that African Americans might be training in Cuba to invade the United States. Utt believed that the Beatles' music caused artificial neurosis in young people. While not a member of the John Birch Society, Utt often spoke in favor of it, and criticized Richard Nixon's denunciations of the organization as ridiculous. During his time in Congress, Utt sponsored bills that would outlaw the income tax and prevent far-right Croatian Andrija Artuković from being deported. Utt also expressed opposition to statehood for Hawaii (due to the Territory having too many non-white people and not enough Christians), interracial sex and sex education. A supporter of the Vietnam War, Utt told his grandson James that he'd rather see him dead and buried in Vietnam than have his political views. Unlike his grandfather, James opposed the war.

In 1964, he had been a strong supporter of fellow Republican Barry Goldwater for the presidency. Goldwater had also voted against the 1964 civil rights law on constitutional and libertarian grounds but later repudiated his position. Utt criticized Attorney General Robert F. Kennedy's treatment of Mississippi Governor Ross Barnett as "vicious" and described the Kennedy and Johnson administrations' positions on civil rights as "Hitlerite."

In 1966, journalist Drew Pearson reported that Utt was one of a group of four Congressmen who had received the "Statesman of the Republic" award from Liberty Lobby for their "right-wing activities".

== Death and burial ==
He died at Bethesda Naval Hospital of a heart attack, which occurred as he was attending church just 10 days shy of his 71st birthday. Utt is interred at Santa Ana Cemetery in Santa Ana.

Utt was succeeded in the 35th Congressional District by fellow conservative Republican John G. Schmitz.

== Electoral history ==
1952 United States House of Representatives elections in California
Party	Candidate	Votes	%
Republican	James B. Utt	106,972	63.0
Democratic	Lionel Van Deerlin	62,779	37.0
Total votes		169,751	100.0
Republican win (new seat)			

1954 United States House of Representatives elections in California
Party	Candidate	Votes	%
Republican	James B. Utt (Incumbent)	95,680	66.2
Democratic	Harriet Enderle	48,785	33.8
Total votes		144,465	100.0
Republican hold			

1956 United States House of Representatives elections in California
Party	Candidate	Votes	%
Republican	James B. Utt (Incumbent)	159,456	64.5
Democratic	Gordon T. Shepard	87,691	35.5
Total votes		247,147	100.0
Republican hold			

1958 United States House of Representatives elections in California
Party	Candidate	Votes	%
Republican	James B. Utt (Incumbent)	152,855	58.2
Democratic	T. R. Boyett	109,794	41.8
Total votes		262,649	100.0
Republican hold			

1960 United States House of Representatives elections in California
Party	Candidate	Votes	%
Republican	James B. Utt (Incumbent)	241,765	60.9
Democratic	Max E. Woods	155,221	39.1
Total votes		396,986	100.0
Republican hold			

1962 United States House of Representatives elections in California
Party	Candidate	Votes	%
Republican	James B. Utt (incumbent)	133,737	68.5
Democratic	Burton Shamsky	61,395	31.5
Total votes		195,132	100.0
Republican hold			

1964 United States House of Representatives elections in California
Party	Candidate	Votes	%
Republican	James B. Utt (incumbent)	167,791	65.0
Democratic	Paul B. Carpenter	90,295	35.0
Total votes		258,086	100.0
Republican hold			

1966 United States House of Representatives elections in California
Party	Candidate	Votes	%
Republican	James B. Utt (incumbent)	189,582	73.1
Democratic	Thomas B. Lenhart	69,873	26.9
Total votes		259,455	100.0
Republican hold			

1968 United States House of Representatives elections in California
Party	Candidate	Votes	%
Republican	James B. Utt (incumbent)	212,684	72.5
Democratic	Thomas B. Lenhart	73,778	25.1
American Independent	Annie McDonald	7,000	2.4
Total votes		293,462	100.0
Republican hold			

== See also ==
- List of members of the United States Congress who died in office (1950–1999)

U.S. House of Representatives
Preceded by District created	United States Representative for the 28th congressional district of California; 1953–1963	Succeeded by Alphonzo E. Bell, Jr.
Preceded by District created	United States Representative for the 35th congressional district of California; 1963–1970	Succeeded by John G. Schmitz
