= Gordon Cologne =

American politician (1924–2019)

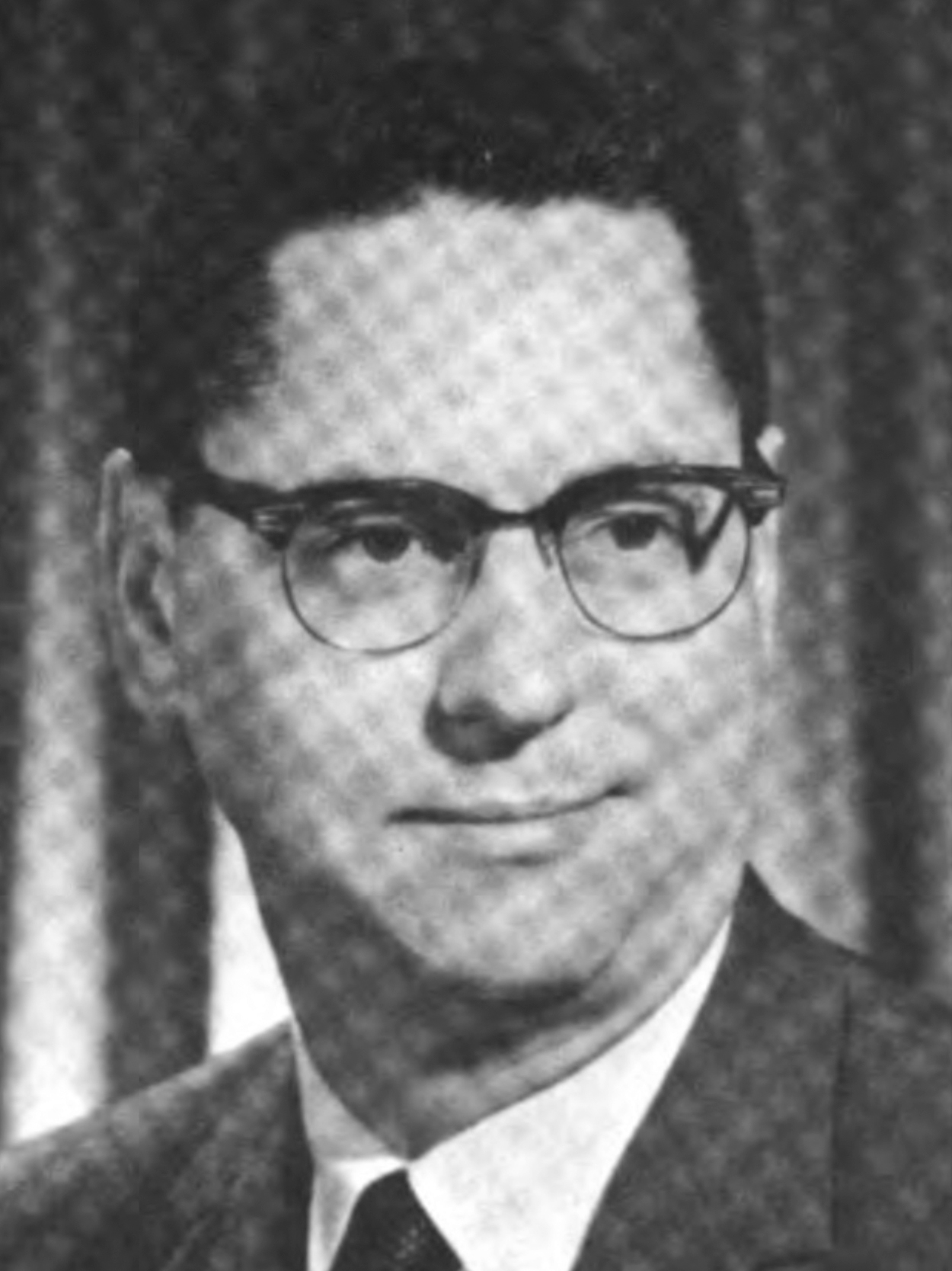
- Official portrait, 1967

Member of the California State Senate
- In office January 4, 1965 – March 2, 1972
- Preceded by: Lee Backstrand
- Succeeded by: W. Craig Biddle
- Constituency: 37th district (1965–1967); 36th district (1967–1972)

Member of the California State Assembly
- In office January 2, 1961 – January 4, 1965
- Preceded by: Leland Milton Backstrand
- Succeeded by: W. Craig Biddle
- Constituency: 71st district (1961–1963); 74th district (1963–1965)

Personal details
- Born: August 24, 1924 Long Beach, California, US
- Died: January 4, 2019 (aged 94) Encinitas, California, US
- Party: Republican
- Spouse(s): Patricia Ruth Regan; Patricia J. Radice
- Children: 2
- Education: University of Southern California

Military service
- Branch/service: United States Navy
- Battles/wars: World War II

Gordon Bennett Cologne (August 24, 1924 – January 4, 2019) served in the California State Assembly for the 71st from 1961 to 1963 and the 74th district from 1963 to 1965. He also served in the California State Assembly for the 36th district from 1965 to 1967 and the 37th district from 1967 to 1972. Legislation that bears his name includes the Porter-Cologne Water Quality Control Act, anti-pollution legislation which predated the federal Clean Water Act. During World War II, he served in the United States Navy.
