= W. Craig Biddle =

American politician (1931–2018)

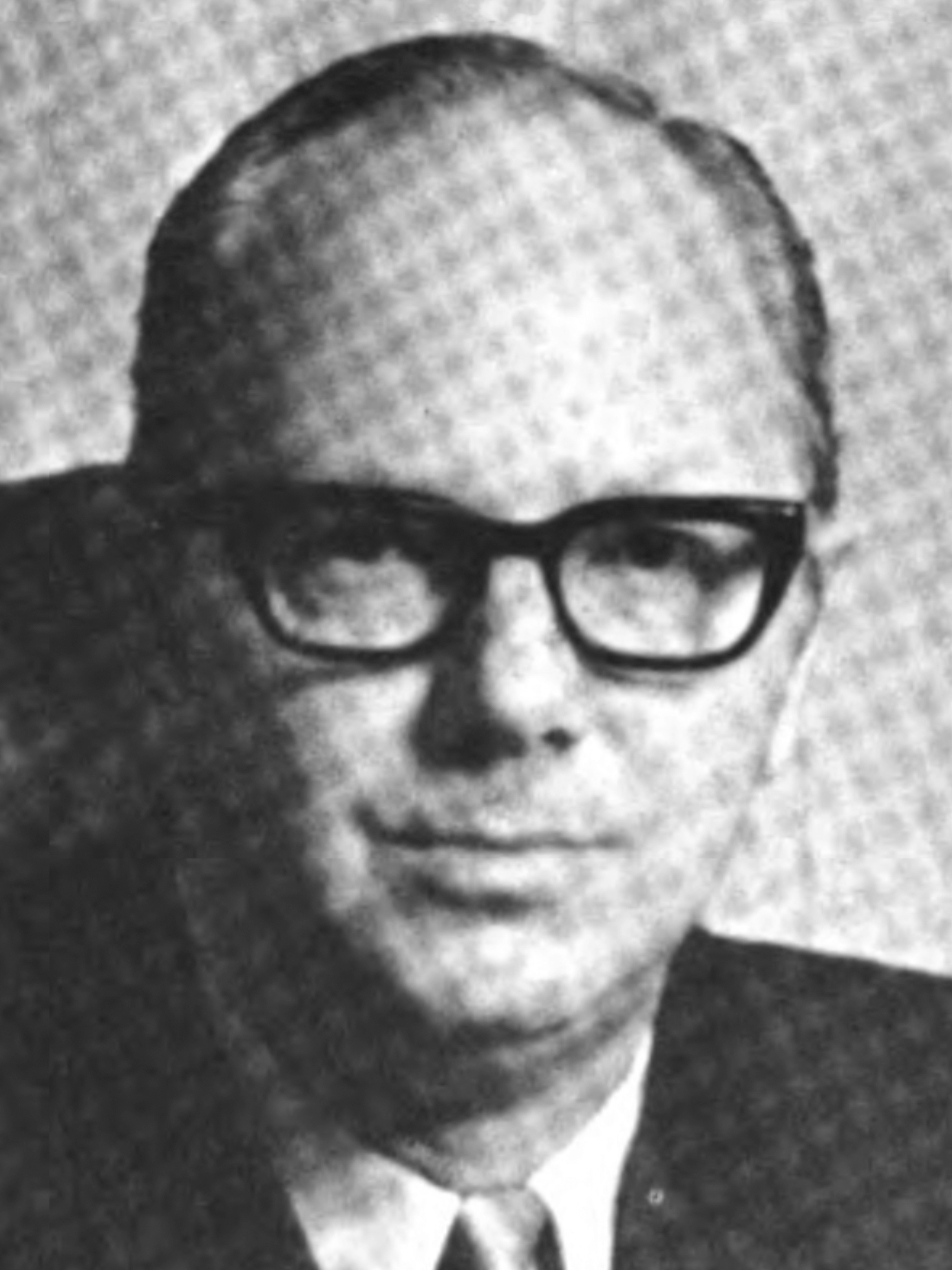
- Official portrait, 1971

Member of the California Senate from the 36th district
- In office June 15, 1972 – November 30, 1974
- Preceded by: Gordon Cologne
- Succeeded by: Dennis Carpenter

Majority Leader of the California Assembly
- In office January 1969 – September 1970
- Preceded by: George N. Zenovich
- Succeeded by: Walter J. Karabian

Member of the California State Assembly from the 74th district
- In office January 4, 1965 – June 15, 1972
- Preceded by: Gordon Cologne
- Succeeded by: Walter M. Ingalls

Personal details
- Born: July 4, 1931 Pasadena, California, US
- Died: September 24, 2018 (aged 87) Florida, US
- Party: Republican
- Spouse: Louise Ellen Wieties
- Children: 3
- Occupation: Attorney

W. Craig Biddle (July 4, 1931 – September 23, 2018) was an American politician in the state of California. He served in the California State Assembly for the 74th district from 1965 to 1972, and in the California State Senate for the 36th district from 1972 to 1974.
