= John P. Schmitz =

American attorney and political advisor (born 1955)

John Schmitz
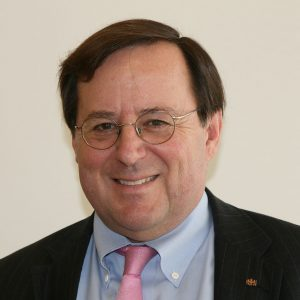

Deputy White House Counsel
- In office 1989–1993
- President: George H. W. Bush
- Preceded by: Phillip D. Brady
- Succeeded by: Vince Foster

Personal details
- Born: John Patrick Schmitz; April 19, 1955 (age 71)
- Spouse: Joan M. Schmitz
- Children: 5
- Parent: John G. Schmitz (father)
- Relatives: Joseph E. Schmitz (brother); Mary Kay Letourneau (sister)
- Education: Georgetown University (BA); California Institute of Technology (MS); Stanford University (JD)

John Patrick Schmitz (born April 19, 1955) is an American attorney and political advisor who served as Deputy White House Counsel to President George H. W. Bush (1989–1993), and Deputy Counsel to Vice President Bush during the Reagan administration (1987–1989). Schmitz clerked for Antonin Scalia at the U.S. Court of Appeals for the District of Columbia (1983–1984).

Fluent in German, Schmitz has worked extensively on German-American issues both in government, and since 1993, in private practice in Washington, D.C. and Berlin.

== Early life and education ==
Schmitz was born April 19, 1955. His father, Republican politician John G. Schmitz, later became a member of the House of Representatives, and ran for president as a member of the far-right American Independent Party. His brother, Joseph Schmitz, served as Inspector General of the Department of Defense from 2002 to 2005, and played a role in the attempt to overturn the 2020 presidential election. Schmitz's late sister Mary Kay Letourneau was a teacher who pleaded guilty in 1997 to two counts of felony second-degree rape of a child and subsequently married her victim/former student. The case received national attention.

Schmitz graduated from Georgetown Preparatory School in 1972. He then earned a Bachelor of Arts degree in economics from Georgetown University. While at Georgetown, Schmitz worked for U.S. Congressmen Goodloe E. Byron (1977) and Charles W. Sandman, Jr. (1973–1975). He received a Master of Science in economics at the California Institute of Technology in 1978. Schmitz was a research fellow to Professors John Ferejohn and Morris Fiorina at the Caltech Environmental Quality Lab. In 1981, he graduated from Stanford Law School, where he wrote for the Stanford Law Review and was a founding member of the Stanford Foundation for Law and Economic Policy.

== Career ==
=== Early legal career ===
After law school, he worked in the U.S. Justice Department as Special Assistant to William Baxter, Assistant Attorney General for Antitrust. In 1983 and 1984, he clerked for Antonin Scalia at the U.S. Court of Appeals for the District of Columbia. Before joining the Reagan administration, Schmitz was an associate at Wilmer, Cutler, and Pickering LLP. In 1984, Schmitz was awarded a Robert Bosch Foundation Fellowship in Germany where he worked with Matthias Wissmann in the German Bundestag and the Office of General Counsel, Robert Bosch GmbH.

=== George H. W. Bush administration ===
Schmitz served as Deputy White House Counsel to George H. W. Bush (1989–1993), and earlier as Deputy Counsel to Vice President Bush during the Reagan administration (1987–1989). Schmitz worked on the Clean Air Act Amendments of 1990, Forests for the Future Initiative, and attended the 1992 Rio de Janeiro Earth Summit. He also worked extensively on regulatory reform and on issues relating to German Reunification.

=== Career post-Bush administration ===
After the White House, Schmitz joined Mayer Brown LLP (1993–2009) as a partner to help establish its first German office in Berlin, primarily working on issues related to antitrust, media, energy and environment, and being admitted to the Berlin Rechtsanwaltskamer in 1994. Schmitz was a founder and Managing Partner at Schmitz Global Partners LLP, and a Managing Director at Prime Policy Group. He is now the President of Prime Transatlantic.

Schmitz's career has focused on Transatlantic relations, especially German-American relations. He has worked on international agreements including the 1996 U.S.-German Open Skies Aviation Agreement (superseded by the EU-US Open Skies Agreement), and the 1997 US-EU Heavy Electrical Equipment Procurement Agreement, which resulted in German Procurement Code reform. Schmitz has been a proponent of market-based instruments to address environmental concerns.

== Personal life and activities ==
Schmitz lives in McLean, Virginia with his wife, Joan M. Schmitz (née Manee). The two have five grown children, Mary, Anna, John M., C. Maximilian, and Julia, and two grandsons. His brother is former US DoD inspector general, Joseph E. Schmitz and his sister was convicted sex offender Mary Kay Letourneau (now deceased). There were seven children in their family and two additional siblings from their father's extramarital affair.

In 1995, Schmitz and his family planted a vineyard, Chappelle Charlemagne, in Rappahannock County, Virginia. Throughout his career, Schmitz has served on numerous boards, including The Atlantic Council, The American Council on Germany, C2ES (formerly The Pew Center on Global Climate Change), Aspen Institute Berlin, IESE, and Friends of Dresden.

Schmitz, fluent in German from a young age, has received recognition as a prominent German-American, receiving honors including the Ellis Island Medal of Honor (1990) from the National Ethnic Coalition of Organizations, the Officers Cross of the Order of Merit of the Federal Republic of Germany (Deutsches Bundesverdienstkreuz First Class), awarded by German President Richard von Weizsaecker (1990), the Distinguished German American of the Year Award (2000) from the United German American Committee, and Robert Bosch Fellow of the Year (2011).
