= Robert B. Presley =

American politician

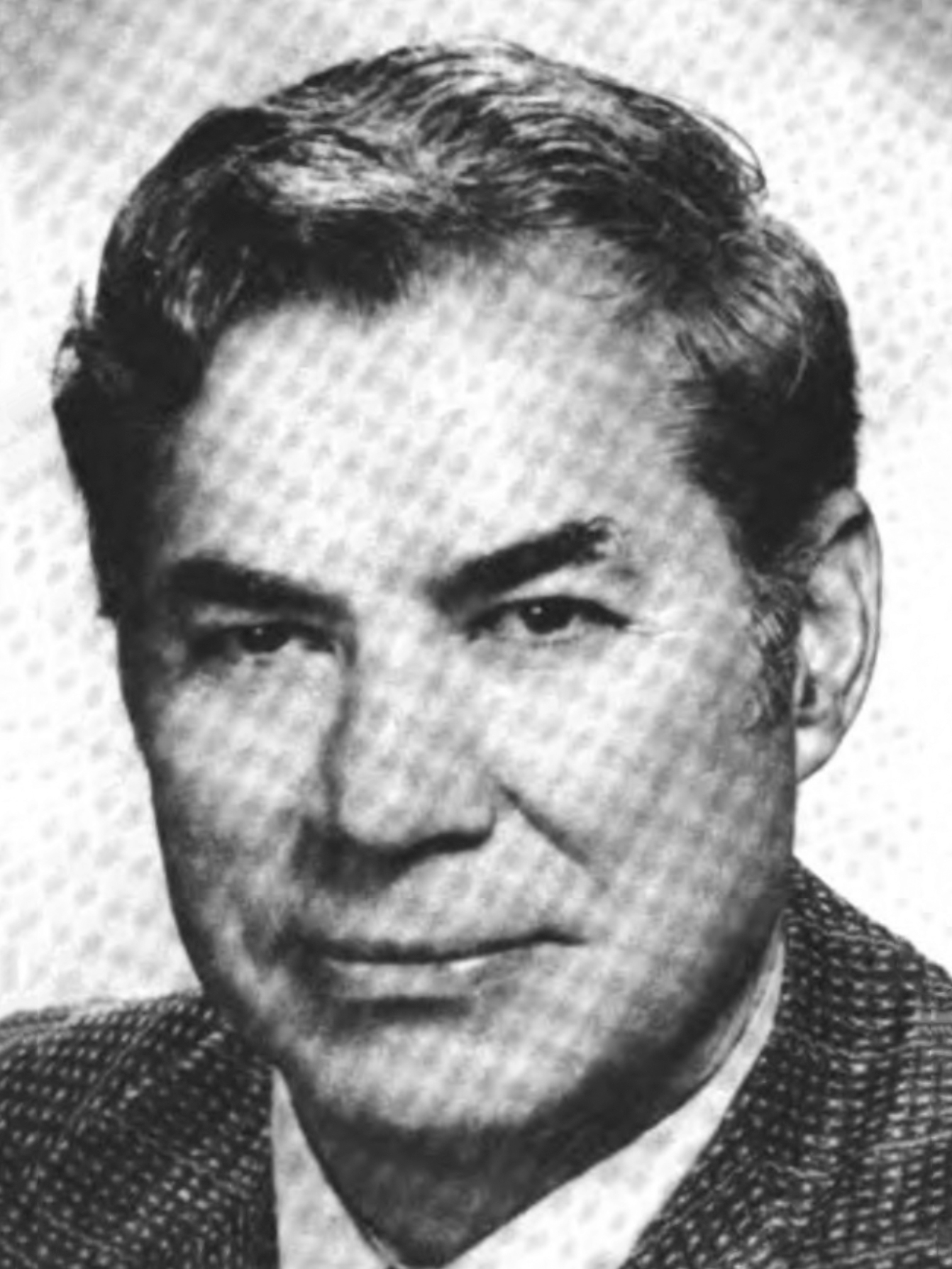

Member of the California Senate from the 36th district
- In office December 6, 1982 – November 30, 1994
- Preceded by: John G. Schmitz
- Succeeded by: Ray Haynes

Member of the California Senate from the 34th district
- In office December 2, 1974 – November 30, 1982
- Preceded by: Dennis Carpenter
- Succeeded by: Ruben Ayala

Personal details
- Born: December 4, 1924 Tahlequah, Oklahoma, U.S.
- Died: September 22, 2018 (aged 93)
- Party: Democratic
- Spouse: Ahni
- Children: 3

Military service
- Allegiance: United States
- Branch/service: United States Army
- Battles/wars: World War II

Robert B. Presley (December 4, 1924 – September 22, 2018) was an American politician who served as a California State Senator from 1975 to 1994.

== Personal life, education, and career ==
Presley was born in Tahlequah, Oklahoma in 1924. During World War II, he served in the United States Army, and then worked with the Riverside County Sheriff's Department for 24 years, with 12 years as a Riverside County Undersheriff.

Elected in 1974 on the Democratic Party ticket, Presley served in the California State Senate from 1975 to 1994 representing California's 36th State Senate district. He then ran unsuccessfully for the California's State Board of Equalization in 1994, but became Chairman of the California Youthful Offender Parole Board from 1995 to 1999, and then served as secretary of the California Youth and Adult Correctional Agency from 1999 to 2003.

During this time, upon his retirement from the Legislature, Presley also served two terms as president of the California State Board of Podiatric Medicine (BPM), which in 1989 had brought in James H. Rathlesberger as executive officer. Rathlesberger was a change agent working with consumer advocates like Presley and Jackie Speier. BPM became the first State agency to support a series of “Presley Bills” in the Legislature aiming to reform physician discipline over Medical Board resistance.

Presley helped guide the BPM through legislative challenges and lent prestige to the efforts for majorities of public members on State licensing boards. The latter failed in the face of stiff resistance from professional societies and the Medical Board of California itself.

The Robert Presley Center for Crime and Justice Studies was established at the University of California, Riverside in 1994, and when the County of Riverside built a new central jail in downtown Riverside, the new facility was named after him also.
