= Gary Allen =

American conservative writer (1936–1986)

- Born: Frederick Gary Allen; August 2, 1936; Glendale, California, U.S.
- Died: November 29, 1986 (aged 50); Long Beach, California, U.S.
- Education: Stanford University; California State University, Long Beach
- Occupations: Author, political activist
- Political party: Independent
- Children: 4, including Mike Allen

Frederick Gary Allen (August 2, 1936 – November 29, 1986) was an American conservative writer. Allen promoted the notion that international banking and politics control domestic decisions, taking them out of elected officials' hands.

== Background ==
As a student, Allen majored in history at Stanford University in Palo Alto, California, and also attended California State University, Long Beach. He was a prominent member of Robert W. Welch Jr.'s John Birch Society, of which he was a spokesman. He contributed to magazines such as Conservative Digest and American Opinion magazine from 1964. He also was the speech writer for George Wallace, the former governor of Alabama, during his third-party presidential bid in the 1968 U.S. presidential election against Richard M. Nixon and Hubert H. Humphrey. He was an advisor to the conservative Texas millionaire Nelson Bunker Hunt.

Allen was the father of four children, including Michael Allen, a political news journalist.

Allen died as the result of a liver ailment in 1986 in Long Beach, California, at the age of 50.

== Writing ==
In 1971, Allen co-wrote a book titled None Dare Call It Conspiracy with Larry Abraham. It was prefaced by U.S. representative John G. Schmitz of California's 35th congressional district, the nominee of the American Independent Party in the 1972 U.S. presidential election. It sold more than four million copies during the 1972 presidential campaign opposing Richard Nixon and U.S. senator George S. McGovern.

In this book, Allen and Abraham assert that the modern political and economic systems in most developed nations are the result of a sweeping conspiracy by the Establishment's power elite, for which he also uses the term Insiders. According to the authors, these Insiders use elements of Karl Marx's Communist Manifesto to forward their socialist/communist agenda:

1. Establish an income tax system as a means of extorting money from the common man;
2. Establish a central bank, deceptively named so that people will think it is part of the government;
3. Have this bank be the holder of the national debt;
4. Run the national debt, and the interest thereon, sky high through wars (or any sort of deficit spending), starting with World War I.

He quotes the Council on Foreign Relations as stating in its 1959 No. 7 study on behalf of the United States Senate: "The U.S. must strive to: A. Build a new international order."

In February 1980, Allen began a working relationship with research assistant Sam Wells, whose work Allen's writings would depend upon until his death. Wells continued his work after Allen's death, assisting his widow with the publication of his newsletter of political and economic analysis.

Allen wrote other books about the Council on Foreign Relations and the Trilateral Commission, asserting that the term New World Order was used by a secretive elite working towards the destruction of national sovereignty. Allen's last book, Say "No!" to the New World Order, was published posthumously in January 1987.

== Selected publications ==
=== Articles ===
- "The Grapes: Communist Wrath in Delano." American Opinion (January 1966).
- "Black Power: American Opinion Goes to a Berkeley Rally." American Opinion, vol. 10, no. 1 (January 1967), pp. 1–14.
- "The Plan to Burn Los Angeles." American Opinion (May 1967).
- "Underground: For Adults Only." American Opinion, vol. 10, no. 12 (December 1967).
- "Negroes: What 'Liberal' Racists Never Mention." American Opinion (March 1968).
- "It's Our Money: The Economics of the Coming Crisis." American Opinion (April 1968).
- "Supreme Court: Is Personal Honor Unconstitutional?" American Opinion (May 1969).
- "The C.F.R.: Conspiracy to Rule the World." American Opinion (April 1969).
- "Bad Medicine: Socialist Medical Care is Bad Medical Care." American Opinion (February 1971).
- "New Education: The Radicals Are After Your Children." American Opinion (May 1971).
- "Get US Out! The U.N. Threatens the United States." American Opinion (January 1972).
- "Beware Metro: Pushing Collectivism at Every Level." American Opinion (January 1973).

"Discusses EO 11647 which establishes ten Federal Regional Councils and which, the author claims, is just more Big Brotherism."

- "Rationing: From The Energy Crisis To Tyranny." American Opinion (January 1974).
- "Rockefeller: Campaigning for the New World Order." American Opinion (February 1974).
- "Bankruptcy: The Conspiracy Against the Economy." American Opinion (October 1974).
- "What a Way to Run a Railroad." American Opinion (January 1976).
- "Federal Police." American Opinion (November 1976).
- "They Run America." American Opinion (May 1978).
- "A Matter of the Kennedy Character." American Opinion (January 1980).
- "Ten Years Later Many Americans Are Calling It Conspiracy." American Opinion (March 1983).
- "Ten Years Later Many Americans Are Calling It Conspiracy, Part II." American Opinion (April 1983).
- "Human Rights, U.S. Security Damaged By Slave Labor Goods: The Red Traders." American Opinion (April 1984).
- "The Press: How the Left Turned Me Right." American Opinion (undated).

=== Books ===
- Communist Revolution in the Streets. American Opinion Books (1967). ISBN 978-0882792125.
- Nixon's Palace Guard. Western Islands (1971).
- Richard Nixon: The Man Behind the Mask. Western Islands (1971).
- None Dare Call It Conspiracy, with Larry H. Abraham. Seal Beach, Calif.: Concord Press (1972)

Reprinted: Buccaneer Books (1990). ISBN 0899666612.

- Kissinger: The Secret Side of the Secretary of State. Seal Beach, Calif.: '76 Press (1976). ISBN 978-0892450022.

Reprinted: Buccaneer Books (1981). ISBN 978-0686313113.

- The Rockefeller File. Seal Beach, Calif.: '76 Press (1976). ISBN 978-0892450015.

Reprinted: Buccaneer Books (1998). ISBN 978-1568493688.

- Tax Target, Washington. Seal Beach, Calif.: '76 Press (1978). ISBN 978-0892450145.

Introduction by Howard Jarvis.

- Ted Kennedy: In Over His Head. Seal Beach, Calif.: '76 Press (1981). ISBN 978-0892450206.
- Say "No!" to the New World Order. Seal Beach, Calif.: Concord Press (1987).

=== Documentary filmstrips ===
- The Great Pretense: How to Finance Communism While Ostensibly Opposing it. John Birch Society (1969).

"A Documentary Filmstrip on How the Free World Finances Communism."

Interviews

- Rees, John H. "Popular Historian Gary Allen: An Exclusive Interview with the Leading Authority on Trilateralism." Review of the NEWS (February 27, 1980). OCLC 1154011138.
