= Alisa Kezheradze =

Georgian pianist and teacher

Alisa Kezheradze ალისა კეჟერაძე
- Born: 11 December 1937; Tbilisi, Georgian SSR, Soviet Union
- Died: 18 February 1996 (aged 58) London, U.K.
- Genres: Classical
- Occupations: Pianist; Teacher
- Instrument: Piano

Alisa Kezheradze (Note: Georgian: ალისა კეჟერაძე, romanized: Alisa K’ezheradze) (11 December 1937 – 18 February 1996) was a Georgian pianist and teacher.

Born in Tbilisi, she received her first piano lessons from her pianist mother Lucya Kezheradze. She studied at the Tbilisi Central Music School for Gifted Children with Nina Pleshcheyeva, a student of Alexander Siloti, and subsequently, at the Tbilisi State Conservatoire with Emil Gurevich.

In the early 1970s, she married construction engineer George Teslenko, with whom she had a son George, and moved to Moscow, where she taught piano at the State Pedagogical University.

In 1976, she met and began working with Ivo Pogorelić, whom she married in 1980.

She died on February 18, 1996 in London, from liver cancer.
