= Robert W. Cobb =

American lawyer

Robert Cobb

Inspector General of the National Aeronautics and Space Administration
- In office April 22, 2002 – April 11, 2009
- President: George W. Bush; Barack Obama
- Preceded by: Frank LaRocca (Acting)
- Succeeded by: Thomas Howard (Acting)

Personal details
- Born: Robert Watson Cobb
- Political party: Republican
- Education: Vanderbilt University (BA); George Washington University (JD)

Robert Watson Cobb is an American lawyer. He worked for the George W. Bush administration before becoming NASA Inspector General.

== Early life and education ==
Cobb attended Vanderbilt University, graduating in 1982 cum laude.

He graduated from George Washington University's National Law Center in 1986 cum laude.

== Career ==
NASA Inspector General

Appointed: February 25, 2002
Nomination sent to Senate: February 26, 2002
Confirmed by Senate: April 11, 2002

Cobb worked for five years as an associate at the law firm of Ober, Kaler, Grimes & Shriver.

Cobb worked for almost nine years at the United States Office of Government Ethics before becoming Associate Counsel to the President in the George W. Bush administration. In this position he was responsible for the administration of the White House ethics program (the conflict of interest and financial disclosure clearance for candidates for nomination to Senate-confirmed positions) under the supervision of then-White House Counsel Alberto Gonzales.

President George W. Bush appointed Cobb to the position of NASA Inspector General on February 25, 2002. The nomination was sent to Senate February 26, 2002 and was confirmed on April 11, 2002.

Cobb served as an "observer" to the Columbia Accident Investigation Board, investigating the 2003 Space Shuttle Columbia disaster.

On April 2, 2009, Mr. Cobb offered his resignation to President Obama, effective April 11, 2009.

Mr. Cobb is currently counsel to the Ethics Committee for Montgomery County, Maryland.

== Sources ==
- NASA biographical sketch
- NASA's Inspector General Probed. Washington Post, 2006-02-03, p A1.
- NASA Chief Defends Embattled Inspector General. Space.com, 2007-04-05.
- Presidential nomination
