= Ivo Pogorelić =

Yugoslav-born Croatian pianist (born 1958)

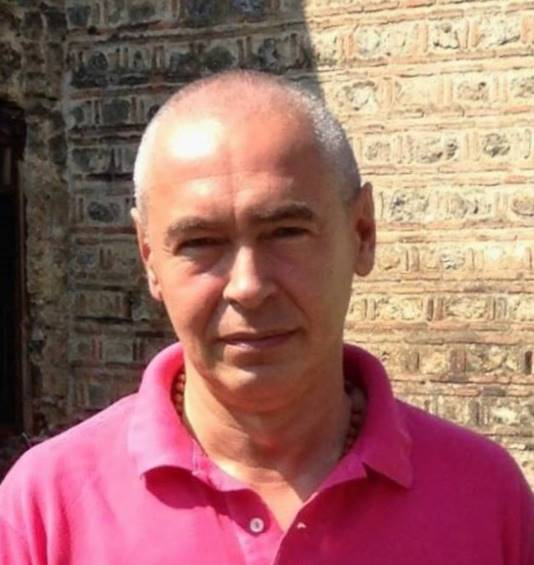
Ivo Pogorelić in 2015

Ivo Pogorelić (also Ivo Pogorelich; born 20 October 1958) is a Croatian pianist. He is known for his sometimes unorthodox interpretations, which have brought him a sizable following and both praise and criticism from musical experts. A musician of wide repertoire, his recordings include works by a variety of composers from the early 18th through 20th centuries.

== Early life ==
"First, technical perfection as something natural. Second, an insight into the development of the piano sound, as perfected by the pianist-composers of the late 19th and early 20th centuries, composers who understood the piano both as a human voice ... and as an orchestra with which they could produce a variety of colors. Third, the need to learn how to use every aspect of our new instruments, which are richer in sound. Fourth, the importance of differentiation"

— Ivo Pogorelić on the most important things Alisa Kezheradze taught him.

Pogorelić was born in Belgrade, Yugoslavia, to a Croatian father and a Serbian mother; he became a Croatian citizen after the breakup of Yugoslavia. Pogorelić received his first piano lessons when he was seven and attended the Vojislav Vučković Music School in Belgrade until he was 12, when he was invited to Moscow to continue his studies at the Central Music School with Evgeny Timakin. He studied alongside the pianist Mikhail Pletnev, with whom he formed a lasting friendship. He later graduated from the Moscow Conservatory, where he studied with Vera Gornostayeva and Yevgeny Malinin. In 1976 he began working intensively with the Georgian pianist and teacher Alisa Kezheradze, who passed on to him the tradition of the Liszt–Siloti school. They were married from 1980 until her death in 1996 from liver cancer.

== Musical career ==
Pogorelić won the Casagrande Competition in Terni, Italy in 1978 and the Montreal International Musical Competition in 1980. In 1980 he entered the X International Chopin Piano Competition in Warsaw but was eliminated in the third round, prompting juror Martha Argerich to resign from the jury in protest, calling Pogorelić a "genius". This action by Argerich, herself a pianist of international renown, precipitated a major scandal in the world of classical music. Her action was supported by two other jurors, who declared that it was "unthinkable that such an artist should not make it to the finals". Other judges spoke out about their disapproval of what they considered Pogorelić's eccentricities. Juror Eugene List stated, "He doesn't respect the music. He uses extremes to the point of distortion. And he puts on too much of an act." Louis Kentner had previously resigned from the jury after his own students were eliminated in the first stage saying, "if people like Pogorelić make it to the second stage, I cannot participate in the work of the jury. We have different aesthetic criteria."

Pogorelić gave his debut recital in New York's Carnegie Hall in 1981. He debuted in London the same year. Since then, he has played many solo recitals worldwide and has played with some of the world's leading orchestras including the Boston Symphony Orchestra, the London Symphony Orchestra, the Chicago Symphony Orchestra, the Vienna Philharmonic, and the Berlin Philharmonic. Pogorelić soon began recording for Deutsche Grammophon and in 1982 he became one of their exclusive artists. He has made recordings of works by Bach, Beethoven, Brahms, Chopin, Haydn, Liszt, Mozart, Mussorgsky, Prokofiev, Rachmaninoff, Ravel, Scarlatti, Schumann, Scriabin and Tchaikovsky.

Following the death of his wife in 1996, Pogorelić took a long leave from giving concerts. In 2019, he released his first album in 21 years, featuring piano sonatas by Beethoven (Nos. 22 and 24) and Rachmaninoff (Sonata No. 2, revised version).

== Critical reception ==
Pogorelić's performances have sometimes been controversial. His interpretations were well-received by concert audiences but not by all critics. Pogorelić's name is often attached with "controversy" and "eccentricity" in printed media.

His early recording of Prokofiev's Sixth Sonata received high praise, including a Rosette award in the Penguin Guide to Recorded Classical Music. New York Times critic Harold C. Schonberg criticized Pogorelić for his unusually slow tempos in Beethoven's Op. 111 Sonata, writing that Pogorelić "seems desperately trying to be the Glenn Gould of Romantic pianism (with some of Gould's eccentricities but none of his particular kind of genius)". Twenty years later, after Pogorelić's return from his extended absence, New York Times critic Anthony Tommasini reviewed a performance of the same piece, writing: "Here is an immense talent gone tragically astray. What went wrong?"

== Other cultural activities ==
In 1986, Pogorelić established a foundation in Yugoslavia to further the careers of young performers from his homeland. In 1988, he was named an Ambassador of Goodwill by UNESCO, the first classical pianist ever so appointed. He no longer occupies this position (as of August 2009).

From 1989 to 1997, the Ivo Pogorelić Festival in Bad Wörishofen gave young artists the opportunity to perform with renowned artists. In December 1993, Pogorelić founded the "International Solo Piano Competition" in conjunction with the Ambassador Foundation in Pasadena, California. Its mission is to help young musicians develop their career with the first prize of US$100,000.

In 1994, he helped to provide medical support for the people of Sarajevo by setting up a foundation that organized charity concerts. He has helped to raise money for the rebuilding of Sarajevo, for the Red Cross, and for the fight against illnesses such as cancer and multiple sclerosis.

== Personal life ==
Pogorelić suffered chronic rheumatic fever during his childhood and hepatitis when he was 21, which left him with a legacy of extreme care for his health. He practises the same biodynamic exercises created for Russian ballet dancers in the 1920s, takes long walks daily, goes to bed when night falls, and rises at 5:30 a.m.

As of late 2024, Pogorelić resides in Lugano, Switzerland.
