= Mary Kay Letourneau =

American sex offender (1962–2020)

- Letourneau in an undated photograph during her teaching career
- Born: Mary Katherine Schmitz; January 30, 1962; Tustin, California, U.S.
- Died: July 6, 2020 (aged 58); Des Moines, Washington, U.S.
- Other name: Mary Kay Fualaau
- Education: Seattle University
- Occupations: Teacher, paralegal
- Spouses: Steve Letourneau (m. 1984; div. 1999); Vili Fualaau (m. 2005; sep. 2019)
- Children: 6
- Father: John G. Schmitz
- Relatives: John P. Schmitz (brother); Joseph E. Schmitz (brother)
- Conviction: Second-degree rape of a child (2 counts)
- Penalty: 7½ years in prison

Mary Katherine Fualaau (previously Letourneau, née Schmitz; January 30, 1962 – July 6, 2020) was an American teacher who pleaded guilty in 1997 to two counts of felony second-degree rape of a child and subsequently married her victim, a former student. The case received national attention.

After achieving a teaching degree in 1989, Mary Letourneau started working at an elementary school in Burien, Washington. In September 1991, she first met Vili Fualaau, a second-grade pupil. Letourneau admired Fualaau's artistic abilities and kept in touch while not being his teacher. Letourneau and Fualaau met again in the fall of 1995, in sixth-grade class. In June 1996, Letourneau, aged 34, committed statutory rape against Fualaau, aged 12. In September, she found out she was pregnant with Fualaau's child.

Letourneau was arrested in March 1997, after a relative of her husband contacted the police. While awaiting sentencing, she gave birth to Fualaau's daughter. With the state seeking a seven-and-a-half-year prison sentence, she reached a plea bargain calling for six months in jail with three months suspended and no contact with Fualaau for life, among other terms. Shortly after Letourneau had completed three months in jail, the police caught her in a car with Fualaau. A judge revoked her plea agreement and reinstated the prison sentence for the maximum allowed by law of seven-and-a-half years. Eight months after returning to prison, she gave birth to Fualaau's second child, another daughter.

Letourneau was imprisoned from 1998 to 2004, spending half a year in solitary confinement for her communication attempts with Fualaau. After her release, she and Fualaau successfully petitioned to the court to have their no-contact order lifted. Mary Letourneau and Vili Fualaau were married in May 2005. The marriage lasted 14 years; they legally separated in 2019. Letourneau died in 2020, aged 58, from colon cancer, leaving much of her estate to Fualaau.

== Early life ==
Mary Katherine Schmitz was born in 1962 in Tustin, California, to Mary E. (née Suehr), a former chemist, and John G. Schmitz (1930–2001), a community college instructor and politician. She was known as Mary Kay to her family. Letourneau was the third of seven children and the first daughter, raised in a "strict Catholic household."

Reportedly, there was an incident of sexual touching between a pre-pubescent Mary Kay and an older brother of hers which ended when Mary Kay said that she wanted it to stop.

When Mary Kay was two years old, her father began a political career, successfully running as a Republican for a seat in the state legislature. He held positions as a California state senator and U.S. Congressman, winning a special election for an unexpired term in 1970, and the general election later that year. After a primary defeat in 1972, he changed parties and ran for president as an American Independent Party candidate in the 1972 U.S. presidential election. In 1973, Philip Schmitz, one of Mary Kay's brothers, drowned in the family pool at their home in the Spyglass Hill section of Corona del Mar, California, at the age of three while she was playing with another brother in the shallow end. While no one was held responsible for the toddler's death, Mary Kay later claimed that the incident caused a rift between her and her mother as she said her parents tasked her with minding her brothers and her mother had become "cold" with her afterwards.

Letourneau attended Cornelia Connelly High School, an all-girls' Catholic school in Anaheim, California, where she was a member of the cheerleading squad for Servite High School. She later attended Arizona State University.

In 1978, her father was re-elected as a Republican to the California State Senate. He intended to run for the U.S. Senate in 1982, but his political career was permanently damaged that year when it was revealed that he had fathered two children during an extramarital affair with a former student at Santa Ana College, where he had taught political science. Her father's affair caused Letourneau's parents to separate, but they later reconciled.

== First marriage ==
While attending Arizona State University (ASU), Mary Schmitz met fellow student Steve Letourneau. She later found out she was pregnant by him, which had led to complications one day in class when she had to be rushed to the emergency room. Doctors found that she had been carrying twins, but one embryo was lost to miscarriage. Mary Kay gave birth to the surviving twin, the first of the couple's four children. She later said that she was not in love with Steve, but she married him after being urged to do so by her parents. Steve also lacked romantic feelings but was also pressured by his parents and willing to marry. Both Steve and Mary Kay dropped out of ASU. The couple moved to Anchorage, Alaska, where Steve found work as a baggage handler for Alaska Airlines. After a year in Alaska, Steve was transferred to Seattle, Washington, where Mary subsequently gave birth to their second child. Determined to get a career in education, Mary Kay enrolled in Seattle University and was awarded a teaching degree in 1989. She began teaching second grade at Shorewood Elementary School in the Seattle suburb of Burien.

The Letourneaus' marriage suffered. They had financial problems, and each party engaged in multiple extramarital affairs. Her attorney and former neighbor, David Gehrke, said that she was "emotionally and physically abused by her husband" during their marriage, and twice "went to the hospital for treatment, and the police were called," although no charges were filed. In May 1999, they divorced while Mary was imprisoned, and Steve gained custody of their four children. In 2010, the Letourneaus became grandparents when their eldest son had a daughter.

== Crime, arrest, and sentencing ==
In September 1991, Letourneau first met Vili Fualaau (/ˈvɪli fʊˈlaʊ/; born June 26, 1983), a child of Samoan descent, when he was her second-grade student at Shorewood Elementary School. She was reported to be highly praised as a teacher by the students' parents. Letourneau described her view of Fualaau at that time as "the kind of feeling you have with a brother or sister". In subsequent years, while not being his teacher, she reportedly continued to cultivate Fualaau's artistic abilities. In the fall of 1995, Letourneau was once again Fualaau's teacher, this time for sixth grade. In January 1996, Letourneau, aged 34, suffered a miscarriage in her marriage. During the summer, Fualaau spent time in Letourneau's house to do schoolwork. People magazine reported Fualaau, aged 12, bet a friend he would have sex with Letourneau, and that she began fantasizing about him.

On June 18, 1996, police found Letourneau with Fualaau in a car parked at a marina. She was seen jumping into the front seat while Fualaau pretended to sleep in the back. She and Fualaau provided false names when asked for identification, and Fualaau lied about his age, saying that he was 18. Fualaau said that no touching had taken place. Letourneau said she and her husband had gotten into an argument, and Fualaau, who she said was a family friend who had been staying with them that night, witnessed the argument and ran away, upset. She said she left to find him. Fualaau failed to furnish a driver's license or any government-issued ID card, but the patrolman deduced he was not an adult as she had claimed. Letourneau and Fualaau were taken to the police station, where Fualaau's mother was called. Mrs. Fualaau said that Mrs. Letourneau was a well-known teacher of Vili's and had no issue with the two of them being in public. As such, the police dropped the matter. She later said that if the police had alerted her to the fact that Letourneau had lied about Fualaau's age and what had occurred in the car, she would not have allowed her son to go back to Letourneau.

In September 1996, Letourneau was pregnant with Fualaau's child. In February 1997, Steve Letourneau found love letters written from his wife to Fualaau. Mary Letourneau was arrested on March 4, 1997, after a relative of her husband's contacted the police. Letourneau pleaded guilty to two counts of second-degree child rape. Her first child with Fualaau, a daughter, was born on May 29, 1997, while she was awaiting sentencing. The state sought to sentence her to seven-and-a-half years in prison. Through a plea agreement, her sentence was reduced to six months (three of which were suspended) in the county jail and three years of sex offender treatment. She was not required initially to register as a sex offender. As part of her plea agreement, Letourneau could not contact Fualaau or her five children or have contact with any other minors. She became the subject of an international tabloid scandal and experienced symptoms of degraded mental health.

On February 3, 1998, four weeks after completing her jail sentence, Letourneau was found by police in a car with Fualaau near her home. Letourneau initially said she was alone in the car. She and Fualaau provided false names when asked for identification. Although it was reported that sexual intercourse had occurred in the car, Fualaau told a detective that he and Letourneau had kissed, frequently, and he also reported that he had touched Letourneau on the thigh but that no sexual intercourse had occurred. There was evidence the two had met, several times, since Letourneau's release from jail on January 2. When she was arrested, police found $6,200 in cash (equivalent to $12,000 in 2025), baby clothes, and her passport inside the car. Receipts for $850 in purchases (equivalent to $1,700 in 2025) made since January 20 for men's, young men's, and infants' clothing were also found. Letourneau said that the money was for dermatology treatments and for her divorce lawyer and that some of the men's clothing were gifts for relatives and for herself, since she enjoyed wearing oversized men's clothing.

In February 1998, the judge revoked Letourneau's prior plea agreement, and reinstated the prison sentence of seven-and-a-half years, for violating the no-contact order. In interviews and in a book on her involvement with Fualaau, Letourneau said she had sex with him in January. Police said they had no evidence that sex occurred in the February car incident. Letourneau served her sentence in the Washington Corrections Center for Women.

While serving her second stint in jail, Letourneau gave birth to her second daughter by Fualaau on October 16, 1998. That year, Letourneau and Fualaau co-authored a book, which was published in France, called Only One Crime, Love (French: Un seul crime, l'amour). In 1999, a second book appeared, published in the United States, but it was written with only minimal cooperation from her and none from Fualaau: If Loving You Is Wrong. During her imprisonment, Letourneau was allowed visits from her children. When her father died in 2001 and Letourneau requested a furlough to attend his funeral at Fort Myer, Virginia, her request was rejected. While in prison, Letourneau tutored fellow inmates, created audio books for blind readers, participated in the prison choir, and "rarely missed Mass." Because of her notoriety, Letourneau was unpopular with other inmates. She "sassed guards and balked at work," and was reportedly punished with spending "18 of her first 24 months" in solitary confinement. In one instance, Letourneau served six months in solitary when letters she tried to send to Fualaau were intercepted.

Fualaau dropped out of high school, and his mother was granted custody of his two children. He struggled with suicidal depression and alcoholism, attempting suicide in March 1999. In 2002, Fualaau's family sued the Highline School District and the city of Des Moines, Washington, for emotional suffering, lost wages, and the costs of rearing his two children, claiming the school and the Des Moines Police Department had failed to protect him from Letourneau. Following a ten-week trial, no damages were awarded. Attorney Anne Bremner represented the Des Moines Police Department, while the Highline School District was represented by Michael Patterson.

== Release from prison and marriage to Fualaau ==
Letourneau was released from prison to a community placement program on August 4, 2004, and she registered the following day with the King County Sheriff's Office as a lifetime level 2 (medium risk) sex offender.

Following Letourneau's release, Fualaau, then aged 21, persuaded the court to reverse the no-contact order against her. Letourneau and Fualaau married on May 20, 2005, in the city of Woodinville, Washington, in a ceremony at the Columbia Winery. Exclusive access to the wedding was given to the television show Entertainment Tonight, and photographs were released through other media outlets. Letourneau said she planned to have another child and return to the teaching profession. She indicated that by law she was permitted to teach at private schools and community colleges.

Attorney Anne Bremner, who met and befriended Letourneau in 2002, during Fualaau's civil suit, said that Letourneau considered her relationship with Fualaau to be "eternal and endless." According to Bremner, "nothing could have kept the two of them apart." In a 2006 interview with NBC News, Letourneau "conceded she knew it would be wrong to let the relationship go any further, but she said as soon as the school year ended, she and Vili did cross that line." She said that "it did not cross her mind," at the time, that having sex with Fualaau would be a crime. In a later interview, she stated, "If someone had told me, if anyone had told me, there is a specific law that says this is a crime, I did not know. I've said this, over and over again. Had I'd known, if anyone knows my personality. Just the idea, this would count as a crime." The television series Barbara Walters Presents American Scandals covered the case in December 2015 with an interview to discuss the couple's relationship and their two daughters.

On May 9, 2017, after almost 12 years of marriage, Fualaau filed for separation from Letourneau, but he later withdrew the filing.

As of April 2018, Fualaau was working at a home improvement store and as a professional DJ, while Letourneau was working as a legal assistant. An article in People quoted an inside source who said, "They know what everyone thinks about their relationship, and they don't care. They really never have. The wrong stuff that happened was so long ago. They are two grown adults who are living their lives now."

The couple finalized a legal separation in August 2019. Earlier in the marriage, Fualaau said he was not a victim, and he was unashamed of the relationship. According to People in May 2020, an unnamed source "close to Fualaau" said that "he sees things clearly now, and he realizes that this wasn't a healthy relationship, from the start."

== Death ==
Letourneau died on July 6, 2020, at her home in Des Moines, Washington, from colorectal cancer. She was 58. Fualaau and her family were present. A joint statement was made by the Fualaau and Letourneau families to commemorate her death. In her will, Letourneau left much of her estate to Fualaau.

== In popular culture ==
Jill Sobule's joking yet sympathetic song "Mary Kay" was included on her fourth album, Pink Pearl (2000).

In 2000, a TV movie was broadcast on the USA Network about Letourneau's illegal relationship All-American Girl: The Mary Kay Letourneau Story.

The book Notes on a Scandal by Zoe Heller released in 2003 was inspired by the case. It was adapted as a movie of the same name starring Judi Dench and Cate Blanchett, in 2006.

The eleventh-season episode "Conned" of the series Law & Order: Special Victims Unit features a storyline based on Letourneau.

The opening scene of the 2012 film That's My Boy, although set in 1984, is loosely inspired by her story.

In the Family Guy episode "Connie's Celica", Lois jokingly retells the story of Letourneau when Peter asked her about her job as music theater in Adam West High School.

The 2023 film May December is loosely inspired by her story.

== See also ==
- Debra Lafave – American former teacher
- Female-on-male statutory rape
- Hebephilia – Sexual preference for pubescent children
- Jennifer Fichter – American teacher and convict
- List of teachers who married their students
- Pamela Joan Rogers – American former teacher and sex offender
- Sexual harassment in education
