= John G. Schmitz =

American politician (1930–2001)

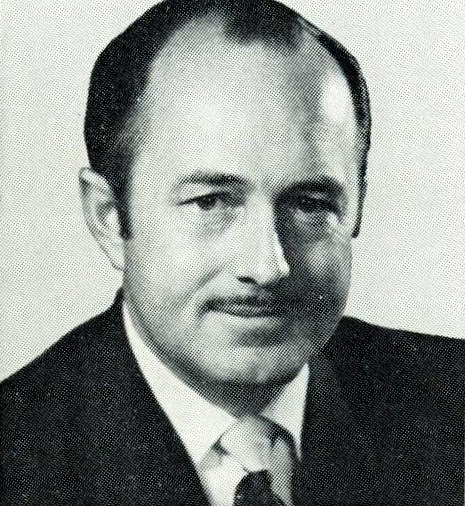
- Schmitz in 1971

Member of the U.S. House of Representatives from California's 35th district
- In office June 30, 1970 – January 3, 1973
- Preceded by: James B. Utt
- Succeeded by: Glenn M. Anderson

Member of the California State Senate
- In office December 4, 1978 – November 30, 1982
- Preceded by: Dennis Carpenter
- Succeeded by: Robert B. Presley
- Constituency: 36th district
- In office January 4, 1965 – June 30, 1970
- Preceded by: John A. Murdy Jr.
- Succeeded by: Dennis Carpenter
- Constituency: 35th district (1965–1967); 34th district (1967–1970)

Personal details
- Born: John George Schmitz; August 12, 1930 Milwaukee, Wisconsin, U.S.
- Died: January 10, 2001 (aged 70) Bethesda, Maryland, U.S.
- Resting place: Arlington National Cemetery
- Party: Republican
- Other political affiliations: American Independent (1972)
- Spouse: Mary E. Suehr (m. 1954)
- Children: 9, including John, Joseph & Mary Kay
- Education: Marquette University (BA); California State University, Long Beach (MA)

Military service
- Allegiance: United States
- Branch/service: Marine Corps
- Rank: Lieutenant Colonel

John George Schmitz (August 12, 1930 – January 10, 2001) was an American politician who served as a Republican member of the United States House of Representatives and California State Senate from Orange County, California. He was also a member of the John Birch Society. In 1972 he was the candidate for president of the United States of the American Independent Party, later known as the American Party.

Schmitz was notable for his extreme right-wing sympathies and for his slurs against African Americans, Asian Americans, Hispanics, women, Jews and homosexuals. By one measure, he was found to be the third-most conservative member of Congress between 1937 and 2002, and the ultraconservative John Birch Society, of which Schmitz was a longtime leader, later expelled him for extremist rhetoric.

On October 25, 1971, Schmitz composed an introduction to the highly controversial book None Dare Call It Conspiracy written by Gary Allen with Larry Abraham.

In 1982, after it was revealed—and Schmitz admitted—that he had engaged in an extra-marital affair and fathered two children with one of his former college students, Schmitz's career as a politician effectively ended, as did his wife Mary's as a conservative political commentator. His seven children with his wife include politicians John P. Schmitz and Joseph E. Schmitz, and teacher Mary Kay Letourneau, convicted in 1997 of child sexual abuse.

Schmitz died in 2001 at the age of 70 from prostate cancer; the former Marine lieutenant colonel was buried with full military honors at Arlington National Cemetery.

== Early life ==
Schmitz was born in Milwaukee, the son of Wilhelmina (Frueh) and Jacob John Schmitz. Schmitz graduated from Marquette University High School in 1948. He obtained his B.S. degree from Marquette University in Milwaukee in 1952 and an M.A. from California State University, Long Beach, in 1960.

=== Military service ===
He served as a United States Marine Corps jet fighter and helicopter pilot from 1952 to 1960, and was a lieutenant colonel in the United States Marine Corps Reserve from 1960 to 1983. Schmitz was Catholic.

== Career in the California State Senate ==
After leaving the Marines, Schmitz took a job as an instructor in philosophy and political science at Santa Ana College. He also became active in the John Birch Society. His views attracted the attention of wealthy Orange County conservatives such as fast-food magnate Carl Karcher, sporting goods heir Willard Voit and San Juan Capistrano rancher Tom Rogers. His personal appearance, in particular the pencil mustache, led to remarks that he was a strong lookalike of David Niven. While his academic career was mainly teaching teenagers and older adults, Schmitz had been noted for working well with children, and used this to his advantage by working part-time at Disneyland as a "Cobblestone Cop".

With their help, Schmitz managed to defeat 74th State Assemblyman Bruce Sumner for the 35th district of the California State Senate, which had been vacated by John A. Murdy Jr, who much like Sumner, was part of the moderate to liberal wing of the California Republican Party. His views were very right-wing even by the standards of Orange County. Schmitz once joked that he had joined the John Birch Society in order to court the moderate vote in Orange County. He opposed sex education in public schools. He believed citizens should be able to carry loaded guns in their cars. He was also critical of the civil unrest that characterized the mid-1960s. He called the Watts riots of 1965 "a Communist operation," and a year later sponsored a bill, which failed to pass, to investigate the backgrounds of teachers suspected of Communist affiliations. He also believed that state universities should be sold to private corporations as a curb against student protests.

Schmitz wrote the foreword for None Dare Call It Conspiracy, a book written by Gary Allen, a self-described former "Americans for Democratic Action liberal", speechwriter for 1968 American Independent Party candidate George Wallace and fellow John Birch Society member. Schmitz believed in Allen's conspiracy that socialists planned to set up a one-world government where they would control the banks, natural resources, commerce, finances and transportation, as well as the idea of Richard Nixon being an agent of the Rockefeller family, who, in Allen's opinion, had financed the Bolshevik Revolution.

== US Representative and presidential campaign ==
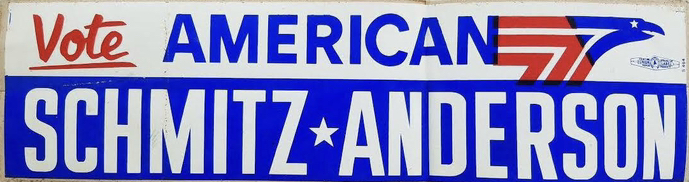
Presidential campaign bumper sticker

Schmitz served in the state senate until 1970, when he won a special election to succeed the late James B. Utt in the House from California's 35th congressional district. He won a full term in November. Much like his successor, Utt had a penchant for conspiracy theories and often spoke positively of the John Birch Society. Schmitz was one of twenty-four people in the House of Representatives to oppose the Equal Rights Amendment (which his wife vigorously campaigned against) and described the bipartisan Comprehensive Child Development Act as a "massive government intrusion".

When Richard M. Nixon, whose permanent residence at the time was in San Clemente—located in Schmitz's district— first went to China in 1972, Schmitz was asked if he supported President Nixon's going to China. Schmitz replied, "I didn't care that Nixon went to China, I was only upset that he came back." Nixon recruited Orange County Tax Assessor Andrew J. Hinshaw, a more mainstream Republican, to run against Schmitz in the Republican primary for the renumbered 39th District. Hinshaw defeated Schmitz by 2.7 percentage points in the primary and went on to win the general election for the seat.

Schmitz, who believed Nixon had shifted to the left in social and economic issues, served as chairman of John M. Ashbrook's 1972 campaign for the Republican Party presidential nomination. Ashbrook competed in the New Hampshire (9.8% of the vote), Florida (9%), and California (10%) primaries, then withdrew from the race.

Schmitz, angry at Nixon's role in his defeat and at Ashbrook's loss in the Republican primaries, changed his party registration to the American Independent Party after being nominated as their candidate for president in the 1972 election. His running mate was Thomas J. Anderson, a fellow member of the John Birch Society. The pair received 1,100,868 votes for 1.42% of the total. Three-time Academy Award winner and fellow John Birch Society member Walter Brennan helped Schmitz with his campaign, serving as finance chairman. Schmitz's best showings were in the West. He received 9.30 percent of the vote in Idaho, where he finished second - ahead of Democrat George McGovern - in the archconservative Mormon counties of Fremont, Jefferson, Madison and Lemhi. In Jefferson County, Schmitz achieved the best result for a third-party presidential candidate in any non-Southern county since 1936, when William Lemke surpassed 28 percent of the vote in the North Dakota counties of Burke, Sheridan and Hettinger. Schmitz received 7.25 percent in Alaska, 5.97 percent in Utah, and between four and five percent in Oregon, Montana, Washington State and also Louisiana.

John Schmitz's county-by-county performance across the nation in the 1972 presidential election. Percentage shades are in increments of two.

== Return to the State Senate ==
Schmitz won the District 36 state senate seat in 1978, with 49.5% of the vote, and subsequently was named chairman of the Constitutional Amendments Committee.

In 1981, Schmitz—who was staunchly anti-abortion—chaired a committee hearing on abortion. Feminist attorney Gloria Allred testified at the hearing in support of the pro-abortion rights position, and afterward sarcastically presented Schmitz with a black leather chastity belt. Schmitz's committee then issued a press release under the headline, "Senator Schmitz and His Committee Survive Attack of the Bulldykes", describing the hearing room as filled with "hard, Jewish and (arguably) female faces." Allred sued Schmitz for libel, claiming $10 million in damages, but settled for $20,000 and an apology. In his apology, Schmitz stated, "I have never considered her (Allred) to be ... a slick, butch lawyeress." Allred later appeared at a press conference called by Senator Schmitz regarding Mid-East issues, handed Schmitz a box of frogs and shouted, "A plague on the House of Schmitz!"

The incident cost him his committee chairmanship and the John Birch Society stripped him of his membership for "extremism." Despite this, Schmitz announced plans to run for the Republican nomination for the United States Senate in 1982.

== Extramarital affair and fall-out ==
Early in 1982, John George Stuckle, an infant born on June 10, 1981, was treated at an Orange County hospital for an injured penis. A piece of hair was wrapped so tightly around the organ—"in a square knot," according to one doctor—that it was almost severed. The surgery went well and the baby suffered no permanent injury. However, the baby's mother, Carla Stuckle, a 43-year-old Swedish-born immigrant and longtime Republican volunteer, was not allowed to take John George home since some of the attending doctors were convinced the hair had been deliberately tied around his penis. Detectives threatened to arrest Carla and take the infant away permanently unless she identified the father. Carla then identified Schmitz as John George's father.

During a custody hearing, Schmitz acknowledged fathering John George in an extramarital affair. He was also the father of Carla's daughter, Eugenie. The admission effectively ended his political career, though he made an unsuccessful run for the 38th Congressional District in 1984. He was defeated by former Congressman Bob Dornan in the Republican primary 65% to 11%, with another candidate earning 24%. Dornan would go on to defeat Democratic incumbent Rep. Jerry M. Patterson in November.

Schmitz's affair also ended his wife Mary's career as a political commentator on television, where she advocated from the conservative position on the political roundtable debate show Free for All. Before entering television, Mary had already become known as the "West Coast Phyllis Schlafly", having campaigned vigorously against the Equal Rights Amendment. When the ERA deadline ran out, Mary had altered a cardboard tombstone Halloween decoration to show the ERA going down in defeat and displayed it prominently on her front lawn. The Schmitzes briefly separated over the affair but reconciled.

Schmitz neither financially supported nor helped raise his two children with Carla Stuckle. When the detective investigating the possible child abuse claim against Stuckle confronted Schmitz about fathering John George, Schmitz confirmed parentage and reportedly told the officer, "I do not and will not support him financially. It is her [Carla Stuckle's] responsibility to take care of him." Stuckle was not charged with any crime, and authorities returned John George to her care. Schmitz denied any abuse to the child or any knowledge of the injury; and was eventually ruled out as being suspect to abuse. Stuckle raised both John George and Eugenie on her own, working long hours at two different jobs. In 1994, when the children were 13 and 11, Carla Stuckle died from complications of Type I diabetes. Schmitz refused custody of the children. Mary Schmitz's close friend, high-profile astrologer and alleged psychic Jeane Dixon, took in the children. When Dixon died in 1997, the children became wards of the state and went to an orphanage.

== Later life ==
After leaving the State Senate, Schmitz taught political science courses at Rancho Santiago and Santa Ana. In 1988, Schmitz, sporting a beard in honor of Robert Bork, blamed the fall of South Vietnam on the media's failure to report communist involvement in the anti-war movement and called Watergate a plot to distract Nixon from focusing on the Vietnam War.

In the 1980s, Schmitz moved to Washington, where he lived in a house formerly owned by Joseph McCarthy, his political idol.

In the early 1990s, Schmitz worked part time at Political Americana, a political memorabilia store, and served as president of Chapelle Charlemagne, a family-owned vineyard in Virginia, from 1995 to his death in 2001.

=== Death and burial ===
Schmitz died of cancer at the age of 70 on January 10, 2001. Following a packed funeral service at the Fort Myer post chapel, he was buried with full military honors at Arlington National Cemetery.

An obituary printed in the Journal of Historical Review, a publication of the organization the Institute for Historical Review, which promotes holocaust denial, described Schmitz as a "good friend of the Institute." Schmitz attended at least two IHR Conferences, and was a subscriber for many years to the Journal."

== Children ==
By wife Mary:

- John P. Schmitz (born 1955): Deputy Counsel to the Vice President (George H. W. Bush) during Reagan administration; Deputy Counsel to the President, George H. W. Bush administration.
- Joseph E. Schmitz (born 1956): Department of Defense Inspector General, George W. Bush administration; Chief Operating Officer and Chief Legal Counsel, Blackwater.
- Mary Kay Letourneau (born 1962, died 2020), former schoolteacher and statutory rapist.
- Philip (born 1970, died 1973)
- Jerome
- Theresa
- Elizabeth

Children by Carla Stuckle:

- John (born John George Stuckle; June 10, 1981)
- Eugenie (born Eugenie Stuckle)

== Electoral history ==
California's 35th congressional district special election, 1970

- John G. Schmitz (R) – 103,127 (49.30%)
- David N. Hartman (D) – 19,163 (9.16%)
- John A. Steiger (R) – 30,191 (14.43%)
- William M. Wilcoxen (R) – 27,016 (12.91%)
- Thomas Lenhart (R) – 16,378 (7.83%)
- John D. Ratterree (R) – 7,881 (3.77%)
- Maggie Meggs (R) – 5,440 (2.60%)

Note: All candidates ran in the same primary. Since no candidate won a majority, the top two finishers from both parties (Schmitz and Hartman) went to a runoff election.

California's 35th congressional district special election, 1970 (Runoff)

- John G. Schmitz (R) – 67,209 (72.37%)
- David N. Hartman (D) – 25,655 (27.63%)

California's 35th congressional district election, 1970

- John G. Schmitz (R) (inc.) – 192,765 (67.04%)
- Thomas Lenhart (D) – 87,019 (30.27%)
- Francis R. Halpern (Peace & Freedom) – 7,742 (2.69%)

California's 35th congressional district Republican primary election, 1972

- Andrew J. Hinshaw – 42,782 (45.63%)
- John G. Schmitz – 40,261 (42.94%)
- Earl H. Carraway – 9,116 (9.72%)
- Larry Denna – 1,597 (1.70%)

1972 American Independent Party National Convention

- John G. Schmitz – 330 (71.74%)
- George L. Garfield – 56 (12.17%)
- Allen Grear – 26 (5.65%)
- Thomas J. Anderson – 24 (5.22%)
- Richard B. Kay – 16 (3.48%)
- George Wallace – 8 (1.74%)

1972 United States presidential election

- Richard Nixon/Spiro Agnew (Republican) – 47,168,710 (60.7%) and 520 electoral votes (49 states carried)
- George McGovern/Sargent Shriver (Democratic) – 29,173,222 (37.5%) and 17 electoral votes (1 state and D.C. carried)
- John Hospers/Theodora Nathan (Libertarian) – 3,674 votes (00.0%) and 1 electoral vote (faithless elector)
- John G. Schmitz/Thomas J. Anderson (American Independent) – 1,100,868 (1.4%) and 0 electoral votes

Republican primary for the United States Senate from California, 1980

- Paul Gann - 934,433 (40.00%)
- Sam Yorty - 668,583 (28.62%)
- John G. Schmitz - 442,839 (18.96%)
- James A. Ware - 95,155 (4.07%)
- Rayburn D. Hanzlick - 76,268 (3.27%)
- Philip Schwartz - 68,790 (2.95%)
- Brian Hyndman - 50,122 (2.15%)

Republican primary for the United States Senate from California, 1982

- Pete Wilson - 851,292 (37.54%)
- Pete McCloskey - 577,267 (25.46%)
- Barry Goldwater, Jr. - 408,308 (18.01%)
- Bob Dornan - 181,970 (8.03%)
- Maureen Reagan - 118,326 (5.22%)
- John G. Schmitz - 48,267 (2.13%)
- Ted Bruinsma - 37,762 (1.67%)

== Publications ==
=== Books ===
- Stranger in the Arena. Santa Ana, Calif.: Rayline Printing Co. (1974).

=== Book contributions ===
- Introduction to None Dare Call It Conspiracy, by Gary Allen and Larry H. Abraham. Seal Beach, Calif.: Concord Press (1972), pp. 5–6.

=== Articles ===
- "Abortionism: The Growing Cult of Baby Murder." American Opinion, vol. 17, no. 3 (March 1974), pp. 1-8.

== See also ==
- List of federal political sex scandals in the United States
- List of members of the House Un-American Activities Committee
- List of members of the American Legion

U.S. House of Representatives
Preceded by James B. Utt	Member of the U.S. House of Representatives from California's 35th congressional district 1970–1973	Succeeded by Glenn M. Anderson
Party political offices
Preceded by George Wallace	American Independent nominee for President of the United States; 1972	Succeeded by Lester Maddox
