= Adrian Thompson =

Adrian Thompson may refer to:

== Sportspeople ==
- Adrian Thompson (boxer) (born 1964), British boxer
- Adrian Thompson, head coach of Australia national under-20 rugby union team

== Other uses ==
- Adrian Thompson (electronic designer); see Evolvable hardware
- Adrian H. Thompson, History of the District of Columbia Fire and Emergency Medical Services Department#Thompson resignation
- Adrian Thompson, musician in Northern Irish band Split Level
- Adrian Thompson, political candidate in Tower Hamlets London Borough Council election, 1994

== See also ==
- Adrian Thomson (born 2006), German athlete
- Adrian Thomson (yacht designer), yacht designer of Team Philips
