= History of the District of Columbia Fire and Emergency Medical Services Department =

District of Columbia Fire and Emergency Medical Services Department
Agency overview
- Established: July 1, 1884
- Annual calls: 175,081 (2011)
- Staffing: 2,000+
- Fire chief: John A. Donnelly, Sr.
- EMS level: BLS/ALS

Facilities and equipment
- Stations: 34
- Engines: 33
- Trucks: 16
- Rescues: 3
- Ambulances: 43
- Fireboats: 3

The history of the District of Columbia Fire and Emergency Medical Services Department, which grew gradually as volunteer companies formed between 1770 and 1860, then more rapidly with the addition of paid members starting in 1864 and the transition to a fully paid department in 1871, has been marked in recent years by various controversies and scandals.

Known today by a number of acronyms — DC FEMS, FEMS, DCFD, DC Fire, or Fire & EMS — DCFEMS remains the municipal fire department and emergency medical service (EMS) agency for District of Columbia, providing fire suppression, ambulance service, technical rescue and hazardous materials containment.

== 19th century ==
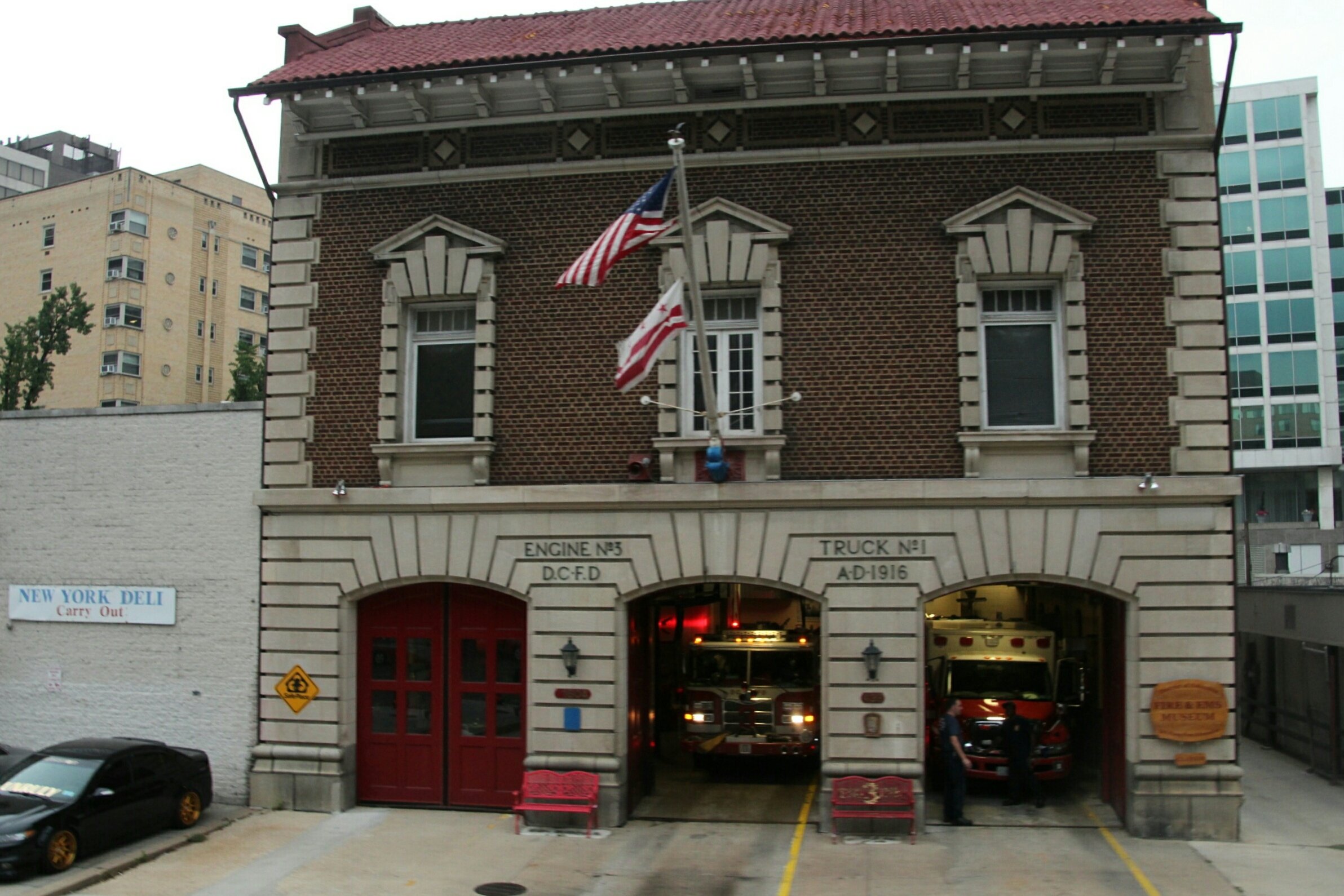
D.C. Fire and EMS Museum, the oldest fire station in Washington D.C.

The earliest official record about firefighting in the District of Columbia is a purchase authorization for a pumper in 1800. (The Fire Department of Georgetown, founded in 1776, would not become a part of the District of Columbia Fire Department until 1871.)

In 1804, after the city was organized into wards, citizens created two volunteer companies: the Columbia Fire Company on Capitol Hill and the Anacostia Fire Company. In 1814, the building that housed the Columbia Fire Company was burned to the ground by the British.

The names of the first firefighters killed in the line of duty in the District of Columbia are unknown, but they are alluded to in 1856 records of the death and funeral of John G. Anderson of the Western Hose Company in Georgetown and, two months later, of Benjamin Greenup of the Columbia Fire Company. Greenup was killed when he was run over by a pumper, which is today on display at the Fire Museum, housed at DC's oldest fire station on Capitol Hill.

The first bill to authorize a paid fire department in Washington was presented to Congress' Committee on District Matters during the session of 1860-61; it was defeated.

The first fire alarm telegraph system was installed in the city on October 12, 1864, and the first alarm was sent using it on October 21 at 12:05 am, to Box 24, near 8th and L Streets, NW.

On April 25, 1864, an act of Congress authorized the formation of a paid fire department in the District of Columbia. Months later, a part-paid department was organized: the Washington City Fire Department, consisting of three engine companies and a truck company under Chief John H. Sessford. A fully paid department was authorized by the mayor in 1870, and the following year, the department was reorganized, expanded to include the Fire Department of Georgetown, and renamed the District of Columbia Fire Department.

In 1873, the fire department was called to help the Baltimore City Fire Department with a fire on Clay Street. Engines 2 and 3 were loaded onto a train that transported them to Baltimore in just 39 minutes. Four years later, the Baltimore City Fire Department responded in kind, sending four engine companies when the U.S. Patent Office caught fire. Two helped fight the Patent Office fire, while the other two responded to a fire that started on G Street.

== 20th century ==
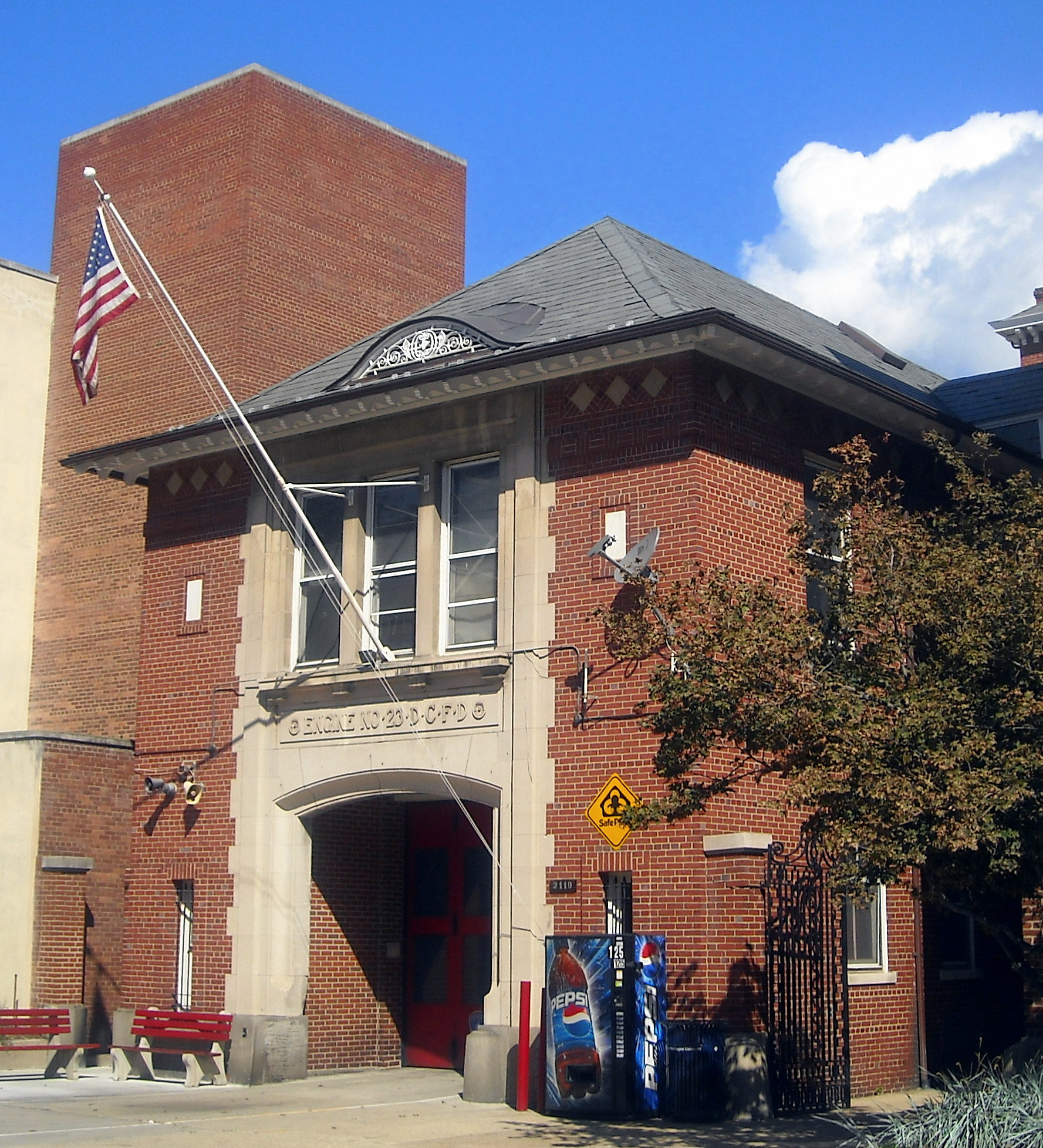
DCFEMS Engine Company #23 in the Foggy Bottom neighborhood.

In 1904, the District of Columbia Fire Department again helped Baltimore, sending Chief Engineer William T. Belt, Fire Marshal Sidney Bieber, and several engine companies.

The first arrest of a serial arsonist in the District of Columbia took place in 1911. Thomas Collins was identified when firefighters recognized him from several fire scenes, where he often volunteered his help. He later admitted to having set 18 fires while drunk and, after a hearing, was confined to St. Elizabeths Hospital.

World War I little affected the department, but a fire at the Quartermaster's Storehouse at the Washington Barracks caused an estimated loss of $100,000 (more than $1.7 million today). The Spanish flu killed six firefighters who contracted it on duty.

In 1922, the Knickerbocker Theater collapsed, killing almost 100 people in one of the deadliest events in the city's history. Firefighters dug for days in freezing weather to save the injured and recover the bodies of the dead.

January 16 and 17, 1928, brought another serial arsonist, and five large fires that required assistance from fire companies as far away as Baltimore, which sent Deputy Chief Reinhardt and 10 companies. Witnesses identified John Joseph Fisher as the person who activated the fire box, and he was arrested and later confessed to having started the fires. After his trial, he was confined at St. Elizabeths Hospital.

During the four days of the 1968 riots after the assassination of Martin Luther King Jr., all DCFEMS firefighters and EMS personnel were mobilized to battle more than 500 fires and perform 120 rescues.

The department was riven by racial tension in the 1970s and 1980s, as the nearly all-white department became much more racially integrated and African American firefighters sought upper-level supervisory and management positions.

== 21st century ==
By 2000, the D.C. fire and emergency medical services (EMS) departments had 33 engine companies, 16 truck companies, three rescue squad trucks, and two fire boats. At least five vehicles a day were used to serve the President of the United States. The department had a $140 million budget and 1,900 employees, including about 1,400 firefighters, paramedics, and emergency medical technicians (EMTs).

But the department was troubled. Training and customer service were poor. The city's fleet was aging and in constant disrepair. Several fire stations were closed because they lacked firefighting equipment. The delivery of a few new trucks and engines in 2000 left the department still needing to replace at least $7 million worth of old vehicles.

Two scandals were also hurting the department. The city paid $1.75 million to settle a lawsuit by the family of a transgender person after firefighters ridiculed the person rather than treating her after an automobile accident. The death led to allegations by D.C.'s large LGBT population that the department was plagued by widespread homophobia. As well, it came to light that D.C. fire department radio equipment did not work on the same frequencies as the Washington Metro, and for years firefighters' radios had not worked in subway tunnels. The public also learned that the fire department was encouraging wealthy, mostly white, citizens in upper Northwest to call the Bethesda-Chevy Chase Rescue Squad for emergency medical services instead of serving the area with its own ambulances (which took much longer to respond). Members of the D.C. City Council said this gave wealthy residents better service than poor ones.

The department also saw a shift in the type of services it was called upon to provide. The number of fire alarms plummeted, thanks to improvements in building fire safety and fire suppression, but worsening public health and a crisis in health-care availability led the public to call on DCFEMS to provide much more emergency health care. In 2002, there were fewer than 100 fire alarms per month but 8,000 to 9,000 calls for medical assistance. By 2013, calls per month had risen to almost 13,350, of which about 10,700 were for emergency medical care.

=== Few: Turbulence ===
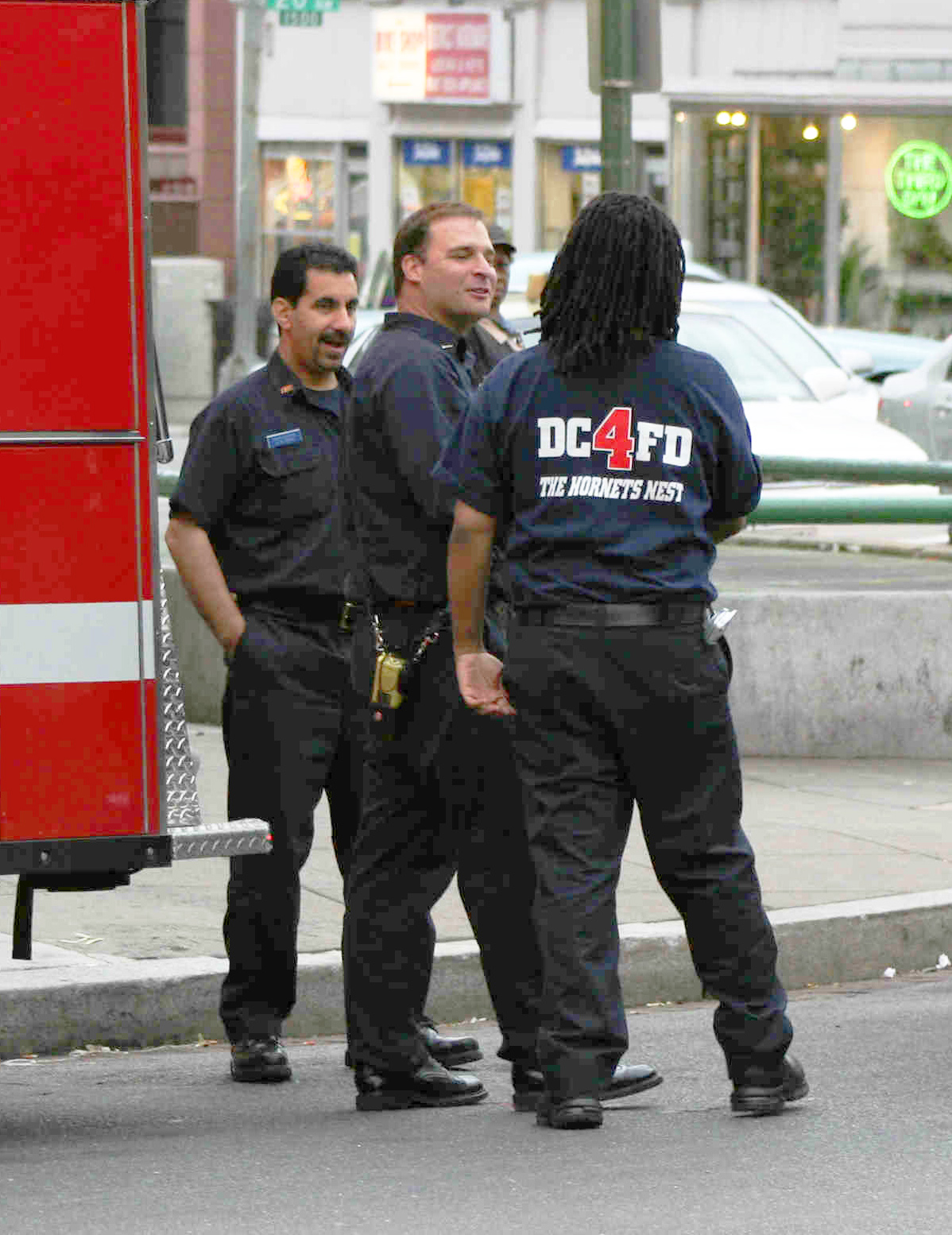
A DCFEMS firefighter with long hair in 2006.

On July 10, 2000, Ronnie Few took over as Fire Chief at DCFEMS, becoming the fourth fire chief or acting fire chief in 18 months. He replaced Don Edwards, who was fired after it was found that he lived in Maryland despite a D.C. law that required cabinet-level city officials to live in the District of Columbia. Few was hired over Acting Fire Chief Thomas N. Tippett, a highly popular career firefighter and former firefighter's union official. Few had little experience overseeing the provision of emergency medical care, although 80 percent of calls in D.C. were of that nature. Few was also only the second fire chief hired from outside the department, and had extremely poor relations with the firefighter's union.

The department had serious problems. Equipment was old, in disrepair, or missing. The workforce was short of employees. At the fire academy, training structures were in serious disrepair and trainees were found to be extensively cheating on tests. The dispatching system could not identify the exact location of structures like the United States Capitol or the Franklin Delano Roosevelt Memorial and dispatchers sent crews to the wrong locations or in the wrong directions. Fire engines and ambulances were having more accidents while responding to calls. Ambulances took twice as long to respond to calls (11 minutes and 21 seconds) than the national average. Firefighters didn't know how to use life-saving emergency equipment such as defibrillators. Injuries to civilians during fires were on the increase. Three firefighters died in 1999 in two months, creating a deep morale problem. (Before 1999, just a single firefighter had died in 11 years.)

==== Grooming policy controversy ====
Few turned a latent legal problem into an active one in March 2001, when he began implementing a never-enforced 1977 policy requiring DCFEMS personnel to have short hair and trimmed beards. Three firefighters were suspended and others threatened with suspension for refusing to adhere to the policy. Chief Few claimed firefighters were unable to wear their helmets or properly seal their safety helmets due to over-long hair. On June 21, 2001, Judge James Robertson of the U.S. District Court for the District of Columbia imposed a temporary injunction against the department, preventing it from applying the short-hair policy to people (such as Rastafarians or Muslims) who wore long hair or beards for religious purposes.

A May 2001 performance report showed that the D.C. fire department was deteriorating rapidly under Few. Halfway through the budget year, Few had met only one of four major goals: filling 120 firefighter vacancies. The number of injuries to firefighters and civilian injuries and deaths had far outstripped the year's goals, and building inspections were far below the expected level. Ambulances were supposed to reach patients 90 percent of the time within eight minutes. Few changed this to 70 percent without explanation, and still the department could not reach the goal. The department was also caught manipulating data to improve the response times. (For example, fire engines with paramedics aboard often responded faster to a medical emergency than a paramedic-driven ambulance with life-saving equipment. DCFEMS began incorporating fire engine response times and neglected to make the change clear.)

==== Haz-mat training controversy ====
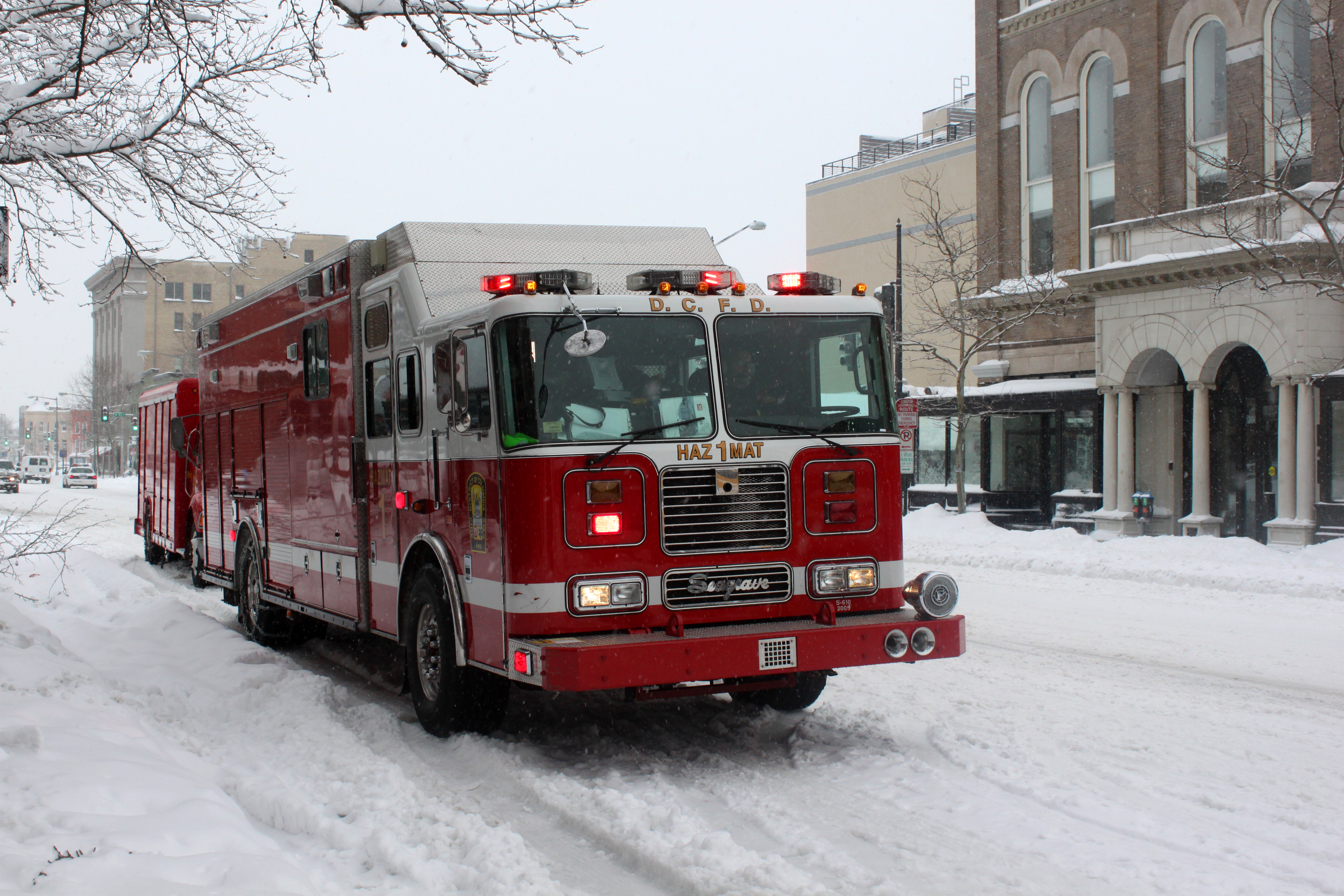
DCFEMS was accused in 2002 of skimping on training and equipment for handling hazardous materials. HazMat 1, the city's main hazardous response vehicle, is depicted, left

A month after a train derailment and fire in a railway tunnel near Baltimore and just two weeks before the September 11 attacks, The Washington Times reported that internal documents showed DCFEMS "woefully unprepared" to handle a hazardous materials (or "haz-mat") spill or a biological, chemical, or radiological attack. Firefighters and emergency medical personnel were not trained to recognize these hazards or contain them, and had not conducted training in the worst sort of haz-mat incident in more than two years. Few pledged in October 2001 to improve haz-mat response by staffing more haz-mat vehicles with lesser-trained staff as an interim measure. He also said the department would eventually train the personnel to the appropriate skill levels.

In December 2001, the Marasco Newton Group, an independent auditor, reported that DCFEMS' haz-mat unit "needs improvement" or "needs significant improvement" in 10 critical areas, and that outside agencies (such as the Federal Emergency Management Agency and the FBI) had deep concerns about the unit. The report concluded the DCFEMS haz-mat unit was poorly staffed, poorly trained, and not competent. At an April 2002 congressional hearing, Few said the report did not reflect the changes made since December, and that even more changes would be made in the next fiscal year.

==== Equipment failures ====
In August 2001, The Washington Times reported that the D.C. fire department's new $5.3 million radio system was so weak that "dead zones" existed in almost 50 locations, including such critical areas as the headquarters of the Metropolitan Police Department, the Harry S Truman Building (headquarters of the United States Department of State), the J. Edgar Hoover Building (headquarters of the FBI), the MCI Center (the city's main basketball and hockey arena), and Union Station (the city's Amtrak, MARC, VRE, and Washington Metro transportation hub). Firefighters' personal radios often could not communicate with headquarters or one another. Eight months of complaints by firefighters had led to no improvement. In January 2002, the problems remained; Few said the city had to wait until $46.2 million in federal anti-terrorism funds were disbursed before the system could be fixed.

Also in August 2001, the public learned that the DCFEMS' new computerized dispatch system was also failing. The system sent ambulances and fire trucks to the wrong location or to locations outside their assigned zone, failed to dispatch the nearest vehicle, or sent trucks to fires in the wrong order. Occasionally, the system attempted to dispatch a vehicle already assigned to another emergency while ignoring available vehicles. Front-line staff complained they had received almost no training before the system was activated in June 2001.

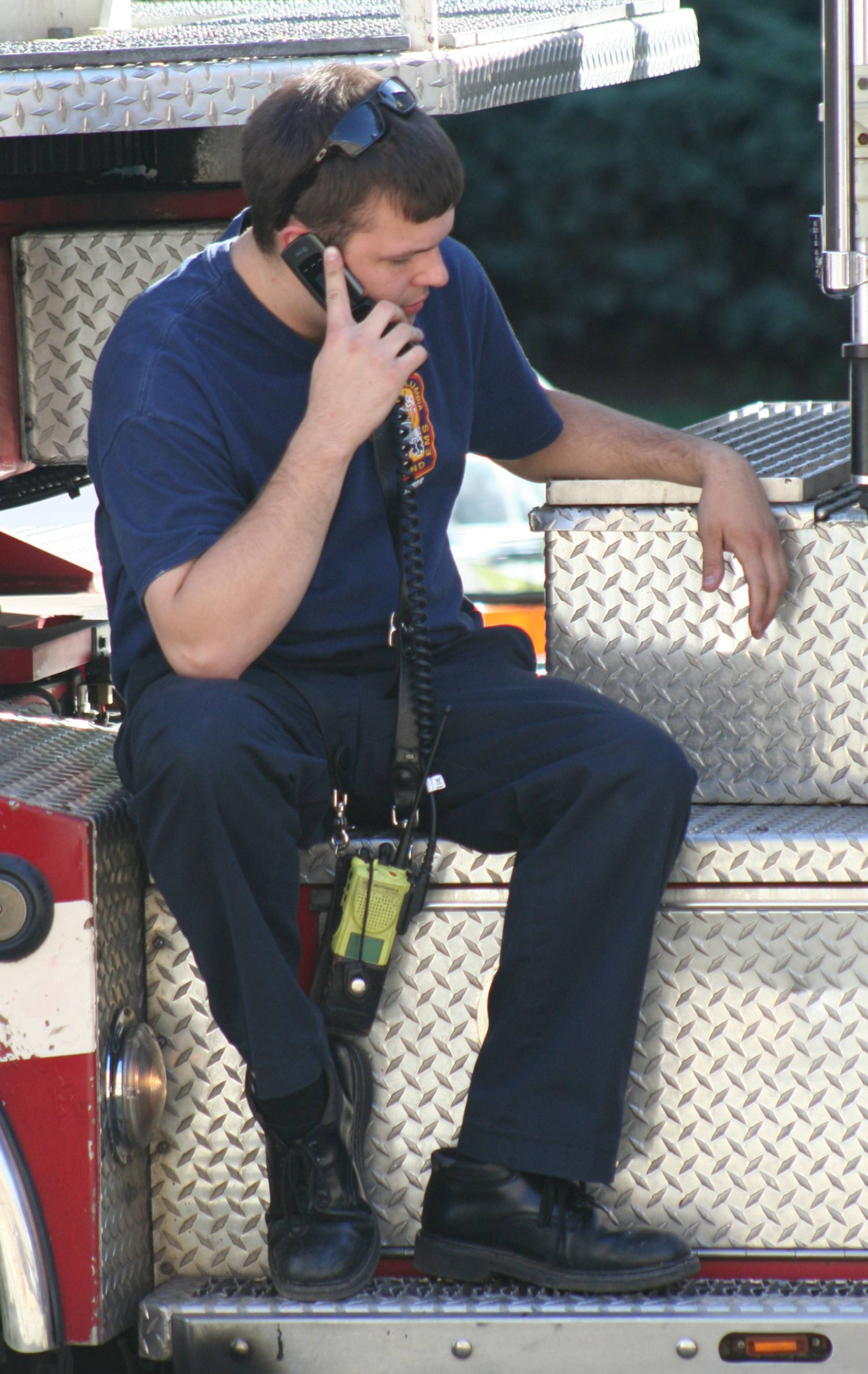
Communications equipment failures dogged the department under Few, and lasted for years.

A report in January 2002 revealed that Few had ordered no new firefighting or emergency services vehicles in the past 18 months, and that much of the city's fleet was decrepit. One-third of its pumper trucks were out of service due to ill-repair and age, so the city was patching up 15-year-old vehicles that had been slated for scrapping four years earlier. The city, which was required to have 18 reserve pumpers, had 13 in 2000 and 11 in 2002—none of which could be held in reserve for major fires. In one case, the city pressed a fire academy training vehicle into service because it ran out of pumpers. The department was also short three of the eight reserve ladder trucks. The chief blamed city officials for not releasing $1.8 million to buy six pumpers, even though he spent $32,000 to purchase a command vehicle and an undisclosed sum to buy 14 cars for himself and other commanders. The report also showed that fire truck drivers were inadequately trained and poorly supervised, and were having too many accidents. Because of the lack of reserve vehicles, drivers continued to operate vehicles that should have been turned in for repair, which worsened the repair problems when the vehicle finally failed. Although Few ordered the six pumpers by June 2002, there were still too few trucks in reserve.

==== Hiring and promotion scandals ====
In November 2001, the D.C. Office of Campaign Finance and the D.C. government's Office of the Inspector General began investigating Few for failing to disclose his relationship with a consultant that he and Assistant Chief Gary Garland had hired. Few had worked for the consultant, Carl Holmes, at his previous job. In late 2000 or early 2001, Few hired Holmes in a no-bid contract that paid $1,800 a day, and did not reveal their friendship as required by law. The following month, investigators discovered that Few had awarded two more no-bid contracts to Holmes.

In March 2002, Mayor Anthony A. Williams announced an investigation into two assistant chiefs and a deputy chief who also may have been improperly hired by Few. Williams said Assistant Chief Marcus Anderson, Assistant Chief Gary Garland, and Deputy Chief Bruce Cowan falsified their résumés by claiming high-level jobs they did not hold and listing certification and educational credentials they never earned. Few had initially raised department morale in August 2000 by reversing a number of transfers ordered by former interim Fire Chief Kenneth B. Ellerbe (and viewed as punitive by the rank and file). But the hiring of Anderson, Garland, and Cowan deeply undercut morale again. "The people [Few] promoted were not the kind of guys that got things done," one battalion chief said. "I think the odds of an insider getting things done ... are probably better".

These personnel scandals deepened in April when the D.C. City Council revealed it failed to identify inaccuracies on Few's résumé, submitted in 2000. The résumé incorrectly listed a college degree Few did not earn, and an honor ("1998 Fire Chief of the Year" by the International Association of Fire Fighters) he did not receive. Some members of the District of Columbia Financial Control Board, which hired Few, said they might have vetoed his employment had they known about the inaccuracies. Few was also accused of misleading Congress by implying that he was a certified paramedic when he was not. Few blamed the mayor's office for submitting an incorrect résumé to the control board and Congress. A few days later, an internal DCFEMS report concluded that Anderson, Cowan, and Garland had not only failed to meet basic performance goals but also that departmental performance had actually declined under them. Under Anderson, ambulances met their arrival-time goals only 41.6 percent of the time, down from 50.2 percent of the time a year earlier. (The national standard is 90 percent, and the city's goal was 80 percent.) The average time for an ambulance to arrive after a patient's call was 15.5 minutes, far above the national average. Under Garland, the emergency fleet continued to deteriorate as well. Not a single new fire engine had been ordered since October 2000, and the average age of engines in reserve was 15 years (nearly 50 percent higher than the 11-year lifespan of the vehicles). Although Garland's goal was to buy four engines in 2001 and six in 2002, only a single small "brush truck" was ordered. Cowan, who supervised the city's building inspection program, was on track to inspect 3,243, buildings, far short of the goal of 5,980 inspections.

On April 26, 2002, disciplinary action was taken against Anderson, Cowan, and Garland. Five days later, The Washington Times revealed that Few was under investigation for previous actions at his old workplaces in East Point, Georgia, and Augusta, Georgia, for repeatedly violating hiring and promotions policies. In addition, Few violated D.C. law in authorizing eight merit-based promotions that had not been earned. (The D.C. fire department had held its first merit-based promotion testing in 22 months in April 2002.)

==== Few's resignation ====
DCFEMS had a budget of about $120 million in spring 2002, $74 million of which went to firefighting and $22 million to emergency medical services. The remaining $24 million went to administration, administrative support, communications, and training. The agency had 1,350 firefighters, 390 paramedics and EMTs, and 200 communications and support personnel.

But at the end of May 2002, DCFEMS was in deep turmoil. The Washington Times called it a "crisis in management that has left the D.C. Fire and Emergency Medical Services Department with crumbling stations, aging vehicles, faulty radios, inadequate training and flagging morale among its 1,900-plus members". There was tension between firefighters and emergency medical services personnel (who had worse pay and benefits); turnover among low-paid paramedics left fire companies understaffed; low pay made it difficult to recruit new paramedics; the "dead zones" in the new radio system were still not fixed after two years; the city installed four radio antenna towers for its radio system instead of the 19 towers required; some firefighters were using vehicles that were supposed to have been scrapped four years ago; there were so few reserve vehicles that on some days there was no reserve; fire stations plumbing and roofs leaked, and electrical systems were outdated and in poor repair; and firefighter vacancy rates had not improved in two years, creating $2 million in overtime costs. The entire communications system failed for 10 1/2 hours after three of the radio dispatch system's four towers suffered rain and lightning damage during a storm. Unqualified cadets were being allowed to graduate from an affirmative action firefighter training academy, and as many as two-thirds of the cadets in the program lacked emotional maturity, had discipline problems (one actually shot another), failed to show up for class, or failed required portions of the course. Training for veteran firefighters was so inadequate that the best-trained firefighters in D.C. were ones who got training by working part-time for all-volunteer fire departments near the District of Columbia.

The overwhelming number of problems and scandals proved too much, and Few resigned effective July 31, 2002. The Washington Times said Few left behind "an agency whose equipment, facilities and morale had been left in shambles".

=== Thompson: Fire and EMS merger ===
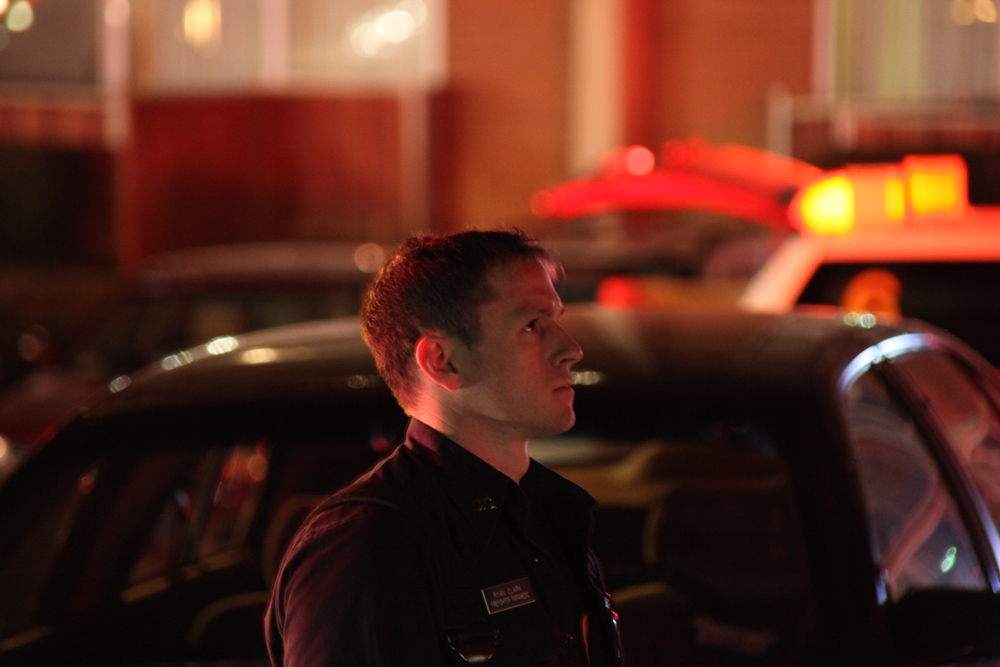
A DCFEMS firefighter paramedic.

Adrian H. Thompson, a career D.C. firefighter, was named Fire Chief in July 2002. A stickler for safety regulations and discipline, Thompson quickly restored morale. Initially hired at the same salary as Few, his pay rose by 18.8 percent to $158,000 a year in 2003.

Thompson discovered that recordkeeping under Few was so poor that the true extent of the paramedic and EMT vacancy issue could not be determined. (An internal DCFEMS study showed the agency had only 174 of the 335 emergency medical workers it needed to operate its 36 ambulances.) The situation was worsening because improvements to fire safety throughout the years meant that the city had fewer than 100 fire alarms in a month but 8,000 to 9,000 calls for medical assistance. A three-month study by the D.C. Office of the Inspector General, released in October 2002, found that the department had no accurate way of measuring how long it took for an ambulance to reach the scene once a call for aid was received. It could and did measure the time it took for ambulance crews to leave the stationhouse once they received an alert, however. This "turn-out time" was double the national average (two minutes rather than one). In two-thirds of the days covered by the study, up to a fifth of all ambulances were out of service due to staffing shortages. All 14 of the ambulances were fully staffed on just four days. The inspector general blamed part of the problem on employees who "are lazy or do not care", while the paramedic and EMT union attributed the slow turn-out time to over-worked and under-staffed employees.

A number of equipment upgrades occurred during Thompson's tenures. The department began using a GPS locator on vehicles to enable dispatchers to identify which available vehicle was closest to an emergency (which the department hoped would speed up response times). Six new fire engines and six new ambulances (ordered in the waning days of Chief Few's tenure) arrived in January 2003, and another 14 fire engines, 16 ambulances, three ladder trucks, and seven command vehicles were put on order.

==== Leadership controversies ====
The EMS division was rocked by leadership scandals in 2004 and 2005. In August 2004, D.C. emergency medical services officials breached confidential patient records by taking them home, a blatant violation of the federal Health Insurance Portability and Accountability Act. EMS Medical Director Dr. Fernando Daniels III was terminated, and city investigators said that many or most of the EMS division's 35 managers could be fired. Daniels' successor, Dr. Clifford H. Turen, resigned on March 1, 2005, after it was learned that he had not yet received a license to practice medicine in the District of Columbia and his speciality was not in emergency medicine.

Leadership problems occurred in the firefighting division as well. By July 2005, both of the assistant chief positions and five of the 12 deputy chief positions were vacant and being filled by acting officers. City personnel rules limited an individual to just 120 days in an acting position, and placement in an acting capacity could not be used in lieu of training or evaluation. In February 2004, Assistant Chief Pete Miller — who oversaw support personnel for the building inspection division, facilities maintenance, firefighter training division, health and safety, and vehicular maintenance — retired. Thompson appointed Deputy Chief Kenneth B. Ellerbe to the position, and Ellerbe was still there more than 17 months (510 days) later in apparent violation of the law.

==== Ongoing grooming controversy ====
The ongoing grooming controversy made news again in June 2005. Federal district court judge James Robertson reaffirmed his "temporary" injunction against the department's short hair and beard grooming policy. However, Robertson allowed the city to submit evidence at trial (to be held at a future date) to prove that longer hair and beards were a safety hazard.

==== Rosenbaum controversy ====
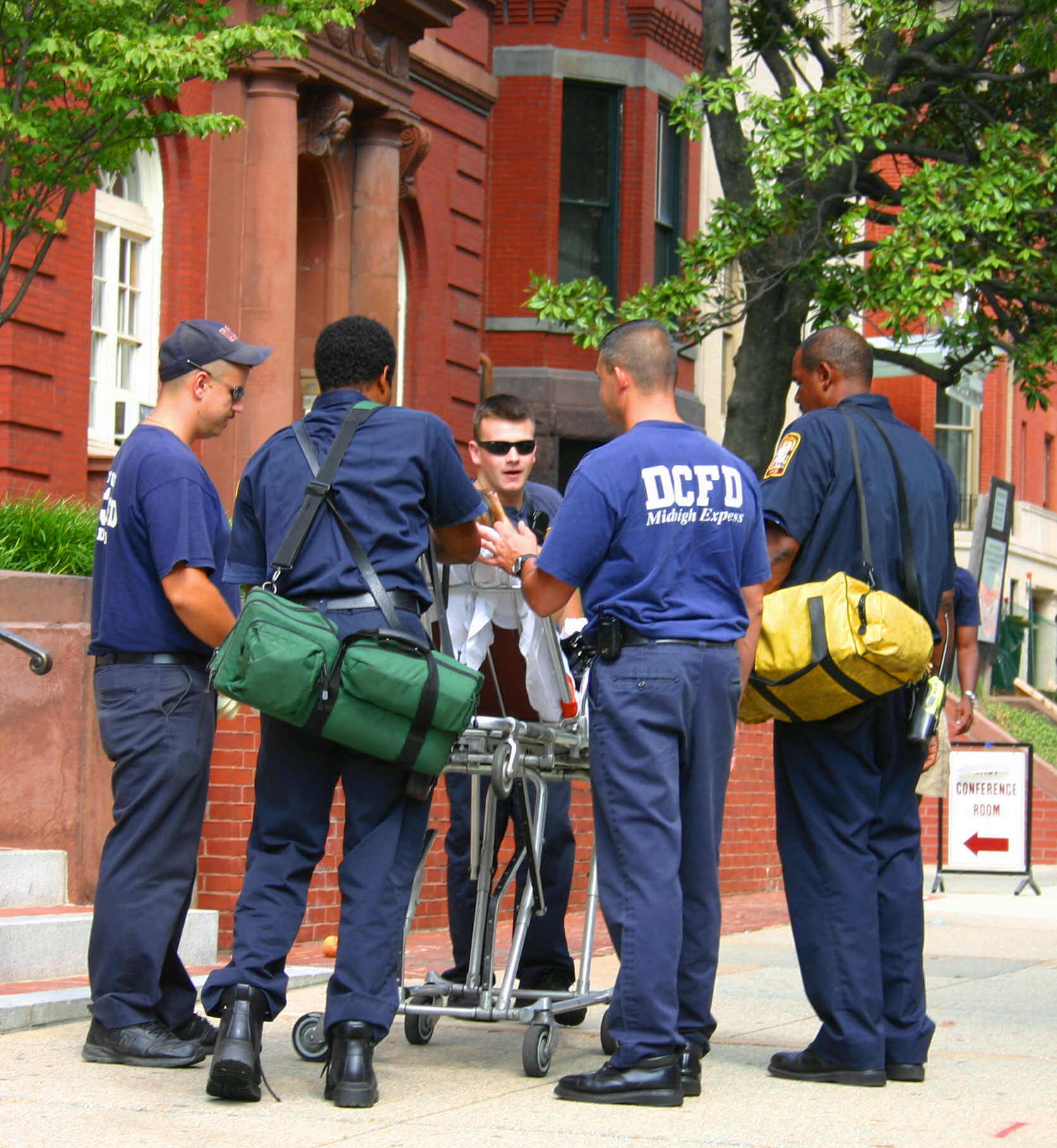
DCFEMS paramedics and EMTs. In 2006, D.C. paramedics incorrectly diagnosed David Rosenbaum's severe head trauma, and he later died. The scandal led to a reorganization of DCFEMS.

Major problems with the DCFEMS department emerged on January 6, 2006. Retired New York Times reporter David Rosenbaum was assaulted in his home during a robbery. EMS personnel misdiagnosed Rosenbaum's severe head trauma as drunkenness, and downgraded the incident to low-priority. Rosenbaum subsequently did not receive timely treatment, and died of his injuries. An after-action report severely criticized the DCFEMS personnel for their actions.

Thompson quickly implemented a number of changes to improve service. Five emergency medical services personnel were disciplined (which included terminating one individual and allowing another to retire). A new credentials and certifications tracking system was put in place to ensure that EMS administrators were properly certified to hold their jobs. New procedures were implemented to ensure EMS personnel understood the scope of their jobs as well as basic patient care protocols, and to better evaluate firefighters, paramedics, and EMTs. Thompson also assigned an EMS supervisor to the dispatch center, and gave the supervisor the authority to reassign EMS crews to short-staffed parts of the city as needed. Ambulance crews were given more authority to determine which hospital a patient should be driven to, and procedural improvements were made to improve communication between dispatchers and EMS crews on the scene. GPS tracking devices were added to emergency medical vehicles to allow dispatchers to identify which EMS vehicle was closest to a call, which the department said would reduce response times even further. Although he ordered these changes, Thompson nonetheless felt that the Rosenbaum case "was an aberration" which did not require substantial alterations to DCFEMS procedures or staffing.

In October 2006, The Washington Times reported that the investigation into the Rosenbaum incident had been bungled when evidence pointing to gross negligence in the case was not promptly reported to the D.C. Inspector General's office. One element of this evidence was a report which provided first-hand information that Rosenbaum's condition was much more severe than reported by EMS personnel earlier in the inspector general's investigation. Investigators said they believed the evidence showed that DCFEMS medical director Dr. Amit Wadhwa "may not have been fully responsive" to investigators and "may have made misleading statements during an official investigation". Wadhwa resigned in August 2006. A departmental spokesman said Assistant Chief of Operations Douglas Smith simply overlooked the evidence, and failed to pass it on. Although the evidence had now been found, the mayor's office declined to pursue any further investigation of negligence in the Rosenbaum case.

Controversy also existed over how the missing reports came to light. Chief Thompson claimed that he independently reviewed all the key documents in the case, realized the reports' importance, and brought them to the attention of the inspector general. But the inspector general's office said it sent a letter to Thompson demanding the reports, and only then were they turned over. Speculation that DCFEMS purposefully withheld the reports rose when City Council member Phil Mendelson alleged that he requested the reports in January 2006 and the department never delivered them.

==== Merger of firefighting and EMS divisions ====
With staffing problems in the EMS division continuing, response times still slow, tension between EMS and firefighting personnel still strong, and stung by criticism in the Rosenbaum case, Thompson implemented a plan in 2006 that began merging the EMS and firefighting divisions into a single unit. Some firefighters were cross-trained in limited emergency medical care (although not to the level of EMTs). EMS-trained firefighters were then assigned to ambulances to fill holes in the staffing schedule, and paramedics were paired with an EMS-trained firefighter during periods when fewer calls came in. (The previous model staffed an ambulance with two paramedics at all times. The pairing permitted paramedics to be spread more evenly through the staffing schedule.) Since fire companies were often the first to respond to a medical emergency, Thompson also placed a single paramedic at those stations which received the highest number of EMS calls. This put a paramedic on a fire truck at 18 of the city's 34 fire companies. Response times for EMS services fell by three minutes.

While campaigning for mayor in 2006, Adrian Fenty pledged to undo the merger of fire and emergency medical services despite these improvements. But Fenty reneged on his promise, and the merger remained intact throughout his tenure as mayor of the District of Columbia (2007 to 2011).

==== Thompson resignation ====
After winning the D.C. Democratic primary in August 2006, Adrian Fenty pledged to terminate Fire Chief Adrian Thompson. "The fire department needs a new chief; there's no question about it," Fenty said. "The whole system is broken, from fire to EMS".

Thompson resigned as fire chief in December 2006. Despite Fenty's criticism, The Washington Post described Thompson's tenure as a success. The Washington Times described his chieftaincy as one of "steady leadership", and concluded he "restored stability" to the agency.

In 2010, a retired Chief Thompson declared the merger of the EMS and firefighting departments a failure. He blamed racial issues in part, noting that firefighters are primarily white and EMS personnel mostly African American and that white firefighters have little respect for the mostly black and poor people they provide emergency care to. Kenneth Lyons, president of the paramedics' union, agreed with Thompson's assessment but also emphasized that management failures and budgetary problems played a role. Retired Fire Chief Dennis L. Rubin (Thompson's successor) dismissed this analysis.

=== Rubin: Stability and budget issues ===
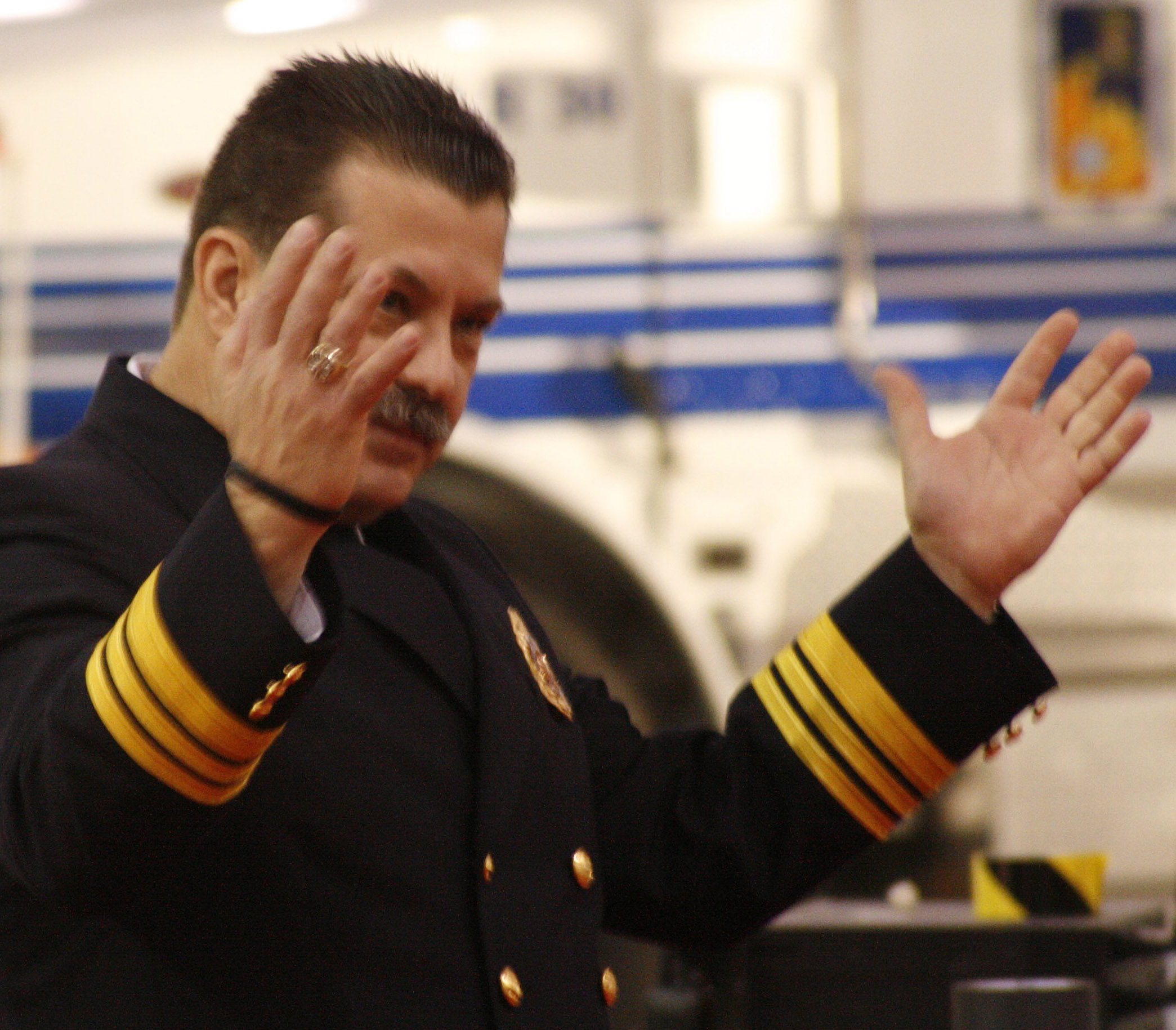
DCFEMS Fire Chief Dennis L. Rubin in 2008.

Fire Captain Brian K. Lee was named Acting Fire Chief in December 2006. Mayor Fenty announced on February 2, 2007, that all reforms in DCFEMS would be suspended until he appointed a permanent fire chief. That same day, Fenty inaugurated four new ambulances (ordered during Thompson's tenure), bringing the city's total to 37. The four were staffed with EMS-trained firefighters, not EMTs or paramedics. The department also debuted a new Electronic Patient Care Reporting System at the same press conference, which it said would improve patient care tracking.

Mayor Fenty named Dennis L. Rubin the new Acting Fire Chief in March 2007. A former fire chief in Atlanta, Georgia, Rubin was confirmed as the permanent fire chief on May 1. Rubin's tenure as Fire Chief was a calm one, even though the local firefighter's union contract expired and no new contract was negotiated.

Beginning in September 2008, DCFEMS began testing a new communications system developed by the United States Department of Homeland Security that linked radio, cell phones, GPS, wireless devices, and the DCFEMS dispatch system together. Known as the Radio Over Wireless Broadband (ROW-B) system, the system was designed to overcome long-standing problems where DCFEMS, police, Metro, and other agencies could not communicate with one another because they used different systems, different frequencies, and different kinds of technology. The ROW-B system was not designed to be a permanent solution to the city's problems, but a pilot project.

==== Conclusion of the grooming policy controversy ====
The department's long-simmering grooming policy controversy was resolved in September 2007. Federal district court judge James Robertson made his temporary injunction against the policy permanent after finding that the department did not prove that long beards or hair impaired the use of safety equipment. The department, he ruled, admitted that no firefighter ever had a perfect helmet or facemask seal (bearded or not) and that no safety issues regarding long hair or beards had arisen in the past three decades.

The judgement of the district court was unanimously upheld by the United States Court of Appeals for the District of Columbia Circuit in March 2009. However, appellate court Judge Stephen Williams admonished the city government's attorneys for conducting such sub-par legal work that the appellate court had no choice but to affirm the district court's ruling. Williams wrote that the scientific literature clearly supported the city's grooming regulation, but that this issue had not been raised by city attorneys in a timely manner.

==== Overtime and budgetary scandals ====
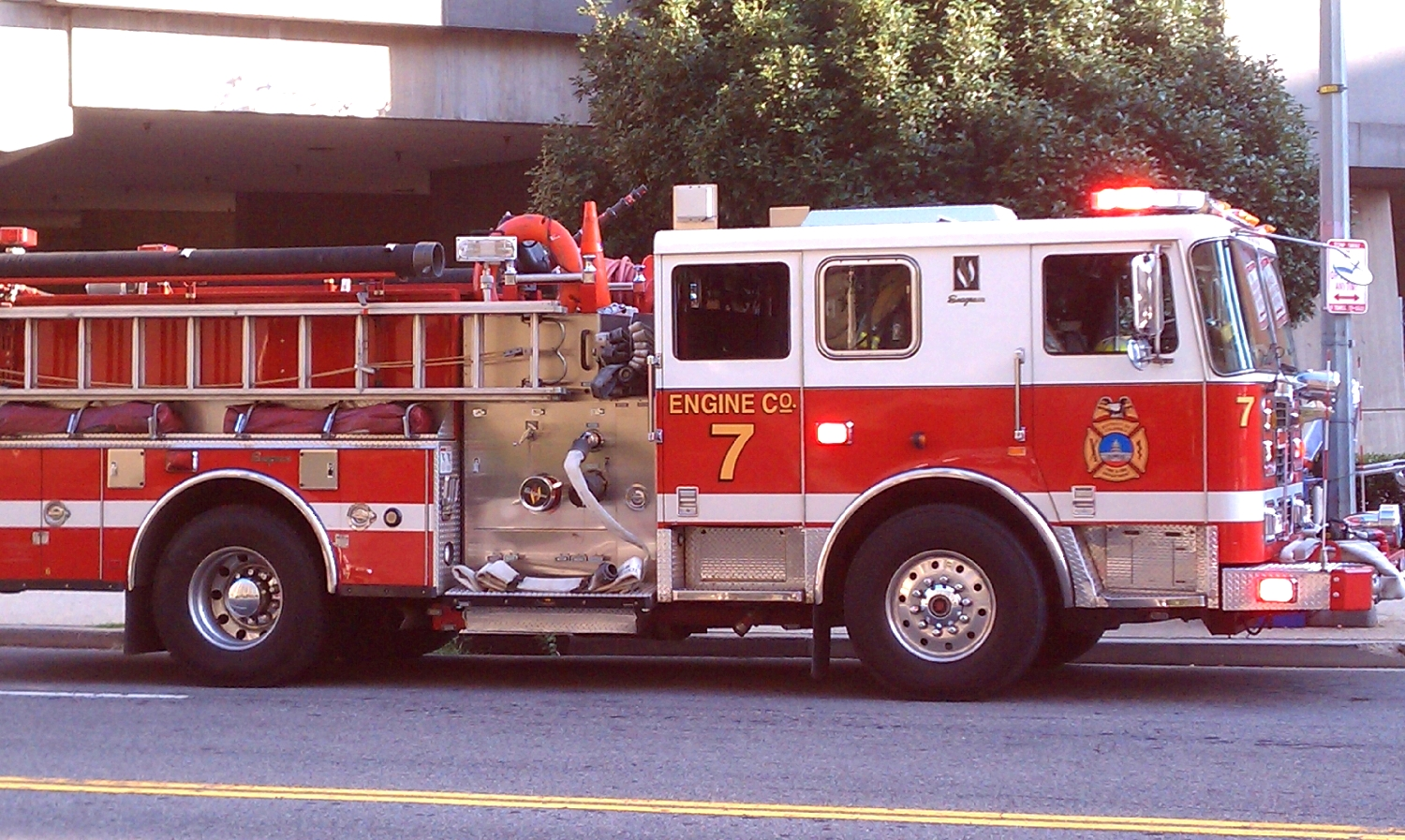
DCFEMS Engine 7.

Rubin faced a major budgetary scandal in 2009 and 2010. In fiscal year 2009 (which ended September 30, 2009), DCFEMS spent $11 million on overtime, although it had budgeted just $5 million. Chief Rubin blamed the problem on extensive firefighter and EMS vacancies, which forced the department to incur overtime. Hiring freezes imposed by the city worsened the situation, he said, and led to even more overtime. Rubin warned the D.C. City Council in November 2009 that fiscal 2010 overtime expenditures would be about $8 million, although the council had approved an overtime budget that remained steady at just $5 million. To avoid going over budget, Rubin claimed that shutting down the fire training academy and the building inspection division, closing several fire stations, and reducing staffing on fire trucks was the only way to rein in these costs. City council members disputed his claim.

In January 2010, the Washington Examiner reported that DCFEMS failed to budget for seniority pay for fiscal 2010, and was $2 million over budget in fringe benefits. Revised overtime figures now showed that the department would spend not $8 million but closer to $15.4 million for the 2010 fiscal year. Ending the hiring freeze was the only way to solve the problem, Rubin said.

==== Ellerbe retirement scandal ====
Another personnel controversy erupted in December 2009 when The Washington Times reported that Deputy Chief Kenneth B. Ellerbe, who had left the department five months earlier to take a job in Sarasota County, Florida, had secured a deal to receive a full pension. Under the deal, DCFEMS had placed Ellerbe on "leave without pay", keeping him technically employed by the District of Columbia until he formally resigned on April 11, 2010. Because that was Ellerbe's 50th birthday, he would be able to collect 80 percent of his final pay for five years (a total of about $600,000), then after five years, his full final salary. The deal said that the department had allowed Ellerbe to go to Florida to "acquire experience as a fire chief in a municipal fire department and thereby be better able to provide the experience of leadership in an executive manager's role". Ellerbe said it was a coincidence that he agreed to resign on April 11, and denied that the deal was designed to keep him on the city payroll until he turned 50. The pension agreement was apparently approved by Fire Captain Brian Lee, and Fire Chief Rubin did not learn about it until it was reported in the media.

The agreement led to public outrage and a City Council investigation. Phil Mendelson, chair of the council's public safety and judiciary committee, called the deal "a special agreement was worked out for somebody high up to cheat the rule regarding retirement". After two months of controversy, Rubin cancelled the pension deal. Rubin told Ellerbe in January 2010 that the agreement was void, and Ellerbe must return to active duty in D.C. or resign. According to The Washington Times, Ellerbe resigned from DCFEMS and remained in Sarasota, although The Washington Post reported that Ellerbe resigned his Sarasota post and returned to D.C.

While living in Sarasota, Ellerbe illegally attempted to claim a tax exemption for his home in Washington, D.C.

==== Other leadership and personnel controversies ====
In May 2007, a federal jury rejected a claim of reverse discrimination brought by 23 white officers. The officers claimed they were denied promotion in favor of African American officers who were less qualified or had less experience. It also claimed that then-Chief Ronnie Few disproportionately chose to interview black officers for promotion. While the lawsuit was pending, all promotions in DCFEMS were placed on hold.

The troubled EMS division continued to have problems as well. In March 2009, Rafael Sa'adah was named assistant chief of the division, even though he personally and EMS as a whole were being sued by the family of Johnquan Wright, who died of gunshots wounds while being treated by DCFEMS paramedics. Wright's family argued that Sa'adah told responders to stop treating the victim in the mistaken belief that Wright had a gunshot wound to the head and was moribund. The D.C. Inspector General's office found no evidence that Wright acted inappropriately. D.C. City Council member Phil Mendelson and local citizens groups also questioned Sa'adah's appointment, albeit on different grounds, arguing that no good-faith national search for an assistant chief had been made despite promises from Chief Rubin.

Another racial discrimination suit was filed in October 2010 when 30 African American firefighters accused DCFEMS of tolerating a racist work environment. The suit named about 10 white male firefighters who were accused or convicted of crimes — including assault (sometimes with knives), sexual harassment (emailing images of their genitals to female colleagues), illegal possession of a firearm, public nudity in the firehouse, and stalking — but had not been disciplined. But black firefighters accused or convicted of similar crimes were punished. The lawsuit also alleged that the department purposefully allowed the 2006 promotions list (which had many black candidates on it) to expire so that a 2010 list (which had few black candidates) could be acted on instead. The suit asked for class action status for the department's 1,000 black firefighters.

==== Rubin resignation ====
In August 2010, Mayor Adrian Fenty was defeated in the Democratic primary for renomination as mayor. Having lost his primary political backer, Chief Rubin resigned his post effective January 2, 2011. He made his announcement on October 22, 2010.

Rubin later wrote in August 2013 that he was upset at the way he was treated while leaving the department. He claimed he was "ushered out of office while being repeatedly stabbed in the back", and that incoming fire chief Kenneth Ellerbe engaged in "an extreme case of a personal vendetta" against him.

Few assessments of Rubin's tenure as fire chief have been made public. D.C. Council member Phil Mendelson was strongly critical of Rubin, however, noting that spending was over budget, the fleet began aging without replacements being scheduled, and morale problems were rising. Rubin's successor, Kenneth B. Ellerbe, has also been critical, and accused Rubin of "trickery" in setting him up for failure.

=== Ellerbe era ===
==== Hiring scandal ====
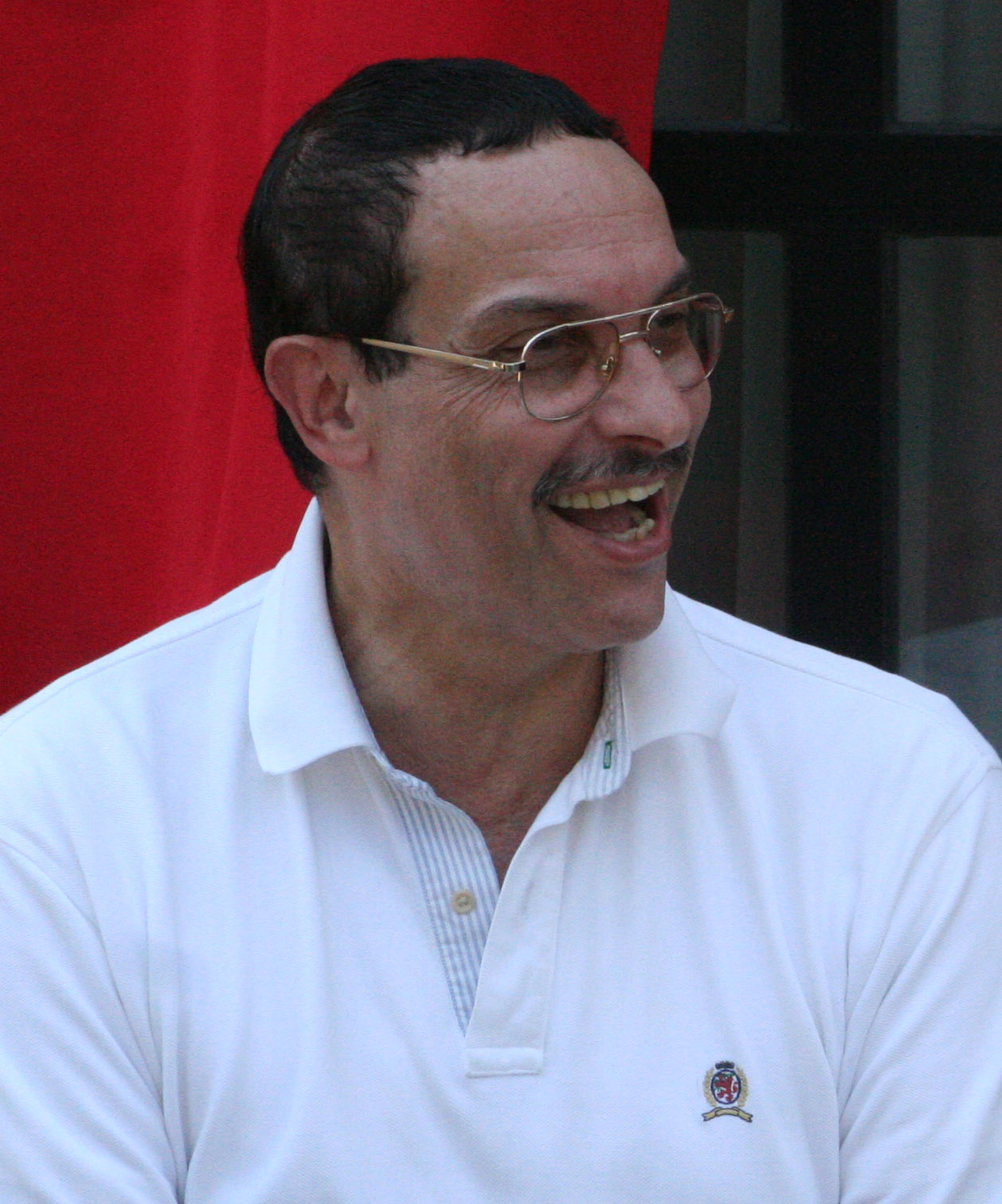
Mayor Vincent Gray appointed his friend Kenneth Ellerbe to be the fire chief.

The city's new mayor, Vincent C. Gray, said in December 2010 that he would appoint Kenneth B. Ellerbe as the city's new Fire Chief. Ellerbe was a family friend of the mayor's and a veteran assistant and deputy fire chief in the department. His salary was $187,302 a year.

Ellerbe's experience included nearly six months as fire chief in Sarasota, Florida. In March 2012, The Washington Times obtained Ellerbe's personnel file from Sarasota; it revealed that he had been accused of sexual harassment by five women in the Sarasota fire department. The newspaper reported that Ellerbe defended his actions to Sarasota Battalion Chief Joe Robinson by saying that staring at women's breasts was "part of my heritage" and that none of the women in the department were good-looking. Robinson also claimed that Ellerbe warned staff not to "cross" him and that he was vindictive. Ellerbe denied harassing anyone, denied making the statements, and claimed the charges were made by union members upset with changes he made in the department. Ellerbe also claimed that Sarasota County found the allegations false, although The Washington Times reported there was no such finding in the personnel file. Sarasota County administrator Dave Bullock told the newspaper that Ellerbe was counseled about the county's sexual harassment policy after the incident, but that such counseling is routine after any such allegation, substantiated or not.

Gray, who had hired Ellerbe without nationwide search for a new chief, conceded that Ellerbe had been inadequately vetted. He defended his actions by saying he wanted to move swiftly to install a new chief. City Council member Mendelson, whose public safety committee held hearings on Ellerbe's nomination, said the committee did not see nor did it ask for Ellerbe's Sarasota personnel file. The firefighters' union and the D.C. Federation of Citizens Associations expressed displeasure that no national search was conducted and that Ellerbe had been hired without complete vetting.

DCFEMS was profiled in the fifth episode of Discovery Channel's Nerve Center, which first aired in June 2011. The episode followed the department's activities on October 30–31, 2010, which included providing emergency medical services at the Rally to Restore Sanity and/or Fear and the 35th Marine Corps Marathon.

==== Uniform controversy ====
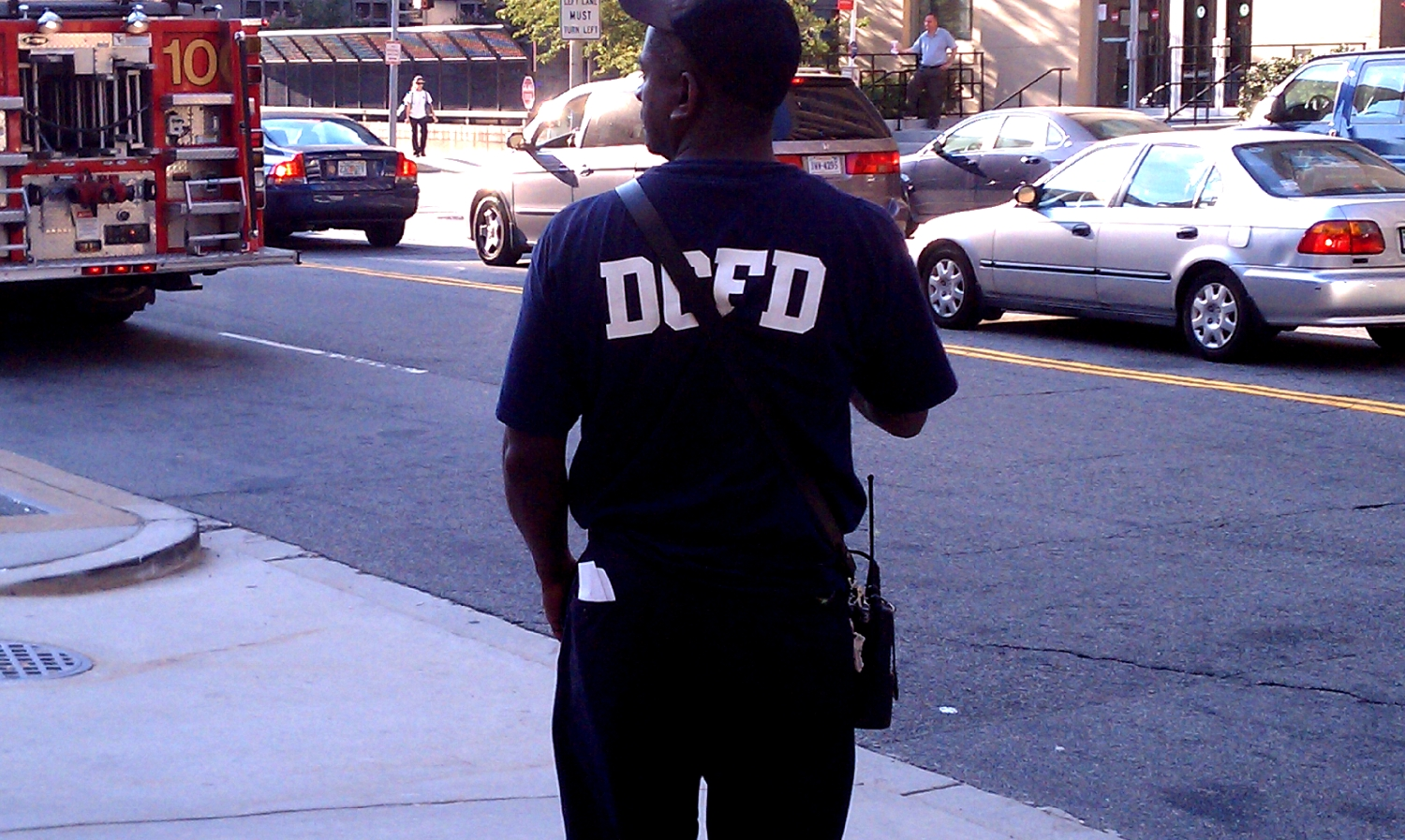
Shirts such as these were banned by Chief Ellerbe in April 2011, one of five changes to DCFEMS personnel uniforms in 2011 and 2012.

Ellerbe created a furor in the department in April 2011 when he changed the departmental logo to read "DCFEMS" and not "DCFD". Because firefighters pay for much of their own equipment (which includes shirts, jackets, boots, and coats), firefighters were faced with thousands of dollars in new clothing and equipment purchases (although they had not had a pay increase in five years). The change would have also required expensive changes to logos on vehicles and buildings. (Former Fire Chief Dennis L. Rubin estimated in August 2013 that the change cost the city $40,000.) The uproar forced Ellerbe to put the change on hold for 120 days, but his order was not rescinded. Less controversial were his decisions to increase the budget for vehicle replacement and to have firefighters and EMS personnel accompany Metropolitan Police Department patrols of high-crime areas.

The uniform controversy continued unabated through 2011. In December 2011, Ellerbe changed the logo again (this time to display the flag of the District of Columbia as well as the flag of the United States). It was the fifth uniform change since ordered by Ellerbe change since becoming Fire Chief. Once more, department personnel were forced to throw out much of their clothing and purchase new gear and clothing with the new seal. Ellerbe threatened to discipline any DCFEMS member not wearing the new new logo. In response, DCFEMS personnel began turning their clothing inside out. In late January, Ellerbe issued an order forbidding DCFEMS personnel from wearing any unmarked clothing. Ellerbe asserted that DCFEMS was a paramilitary organization and unmarked clothing was "a risk to homeland security", but the firefighters' union said it was a retaliatory action in response to wearing clothing inside-out and drawing attention to Ellerbe's inconstant uniform policy.

The logo change caused another controversy in April 2012. The department ordered 1,750 fire-resistive polo shirts at a cost of $70,000 shortly before Ellerbe took office. On April 12, 2012, DCFEMS issued an order to all personnel stating that the shirts would be given to staff even though it bore the old logo. Less than 30 minutes later, this order was rescinded. D.C. City Council members then inquired about how the department was going to use the stored shirts. DCFEMS assistant chiefs said the order was issued in error, and department leaders promised to issue an order concerning the shirts at some point in the future. Compounding the problem, former Fire Chief Rubin claimed that two DCFEMS firefighters were severely burned and two moderately burned in 2012 because the shirts which Ellerbe continued to use were not fire-resistive. Rubin's claims were later more widely reported by national news media. Ellerbe attributed the purchase of the shirt to "trickery" by Rubin, designed to set Ellerbe up for failure.

==== Overtime controversy ====
Overtime pay dropped in Ellerbe's first eight months on the job. The department incurred $12 million in overtime in fiscal 2010, but according to Ellerbe was on track to spend just $5 million in all of fiscal 2011 (although that was still $1 million more than budgeted). The Washington Examiner credited the drop to a new legal limit of $20,000 in overtime per firefighter per year, imposed by the city council.

The following year, however, overtime rose again. The department anticipated going over budget by $2 million on overtime, despite moving more firefighters off sick leave and onto the active duty rolls. The firefighters' union blamed the overtime increase on Ellerbe's failure to fill 163 departmental vacancies. Ellerbe did not deny the charge, but said in late June 2012 that "several dozen" firefighters would be hired shortly. The controversy deepened when Ellerbe closed three stations (Adams Morgan, North Cleveland Park, and Washington Highlands) for two days due to a staffing shortage. Ellerbe asserted that too many firefighters at other stations took leave, so he closed the three stations to staff the remaining ones and keep them open. The firefighters' union charged that Ellerbe was creating a false crisis. Money to pay the salaries of the unfilled positions was lying unused, and should have been spent on overtime pay to keep the three stations open, the union argued.

==== Twitter controversy ====
In late August 2011, the department shuttered its Twitter account, which had been in operation since March 2009. It also encrypted its police radio broadcasts. The department's communications director, Lon Walls, justified the closure by saying, "Social media is for parties. We ain't giving parties". Chief Ellerbe provided a different rationale, arguing that incorrect information could be distributed by the Twitter feed, endangering public safety or causing problems for emergency responders. After pushback from local media, the account returned, although it no longer reported crime-related events. The department refused to decrypt its radio use, however.

Ellerbe later placed Walls on leave in February 2012 after a heated exchange about racism on Twitter. More than 100 firefighters walked out of a State of the Department address delivered by Chief Ellerbe in early February. On his personal Twitter feed and personal Facebook account, Walls called the action the "most blatant, ignorant and racist public display of disrespect I have ever seen". The Washington Times inquired about the posts, and Walls removed them at Chief Ellerbe's request. Walls' suspension-with-pay lasted a few days.

==== Firefighter scheduling controversy ====
A major controversy over scheduling erupted in November 2011 when Ellerbe proposed that firefighters work a "3-3-3 shift"—three 12-hour days (with nights off), three 12-hour nights (with days off), and three days off. It was a staffing model used by the D.C. fire department in the 1960s and 1970s, and marked a change from the then-current practice of a single 24-hour shift followed by three days off (known as 24/72). Ellerbe claimed it would reduce staffing costs by $36 million a year after four years, and increase days worked per month to 22 from eight. Because about 40 percent of the city's firefighters lived 30 to 100 miles away, the plan also encouraged firefighters to move closer to Washington, D.C. This would enable the city to recall off-duty firefighters more quickly in an emergency, he said. The union, Local 36, IAFF, strongly opposed the plan. It said firefighters' salaries ($44,300 for a new hire, and $65,500 for a 20-year veteran) were too low to allow firefighters to live in or near the District of Columbia. The staffing plan would force them to lower their standard of living by moving nearer or into D.C., and deny them the opportunity to work second jobs. The union also said the long lead-time to recall off-duty staff was actually beneficial (since it took the city several hours to get ready during an emergency). It denied the plan would save money, and offered an analysis that showed the change would cost the city $16 million a year.

Rank-and-file anger about proposal was deep, and many firefighters talked about protesting the proposal publicly during the chief's State of the Department speech in late January. This itself caused a controversy, for firefighters claimed that, in the days prior to the speech, handwritten directives began appearing in firehouse logbooks that barred various kinds of protest and threatened punishment for anyone disrupting the chief's speech. Departmental officials denied writing the directives, although the union said it had had an email discussion with Ellerbe verifying that the directives were official.

When Ellerbe delivered his State of the Department speech (the first ever delivered by a fire chief), more than 100 firefighters turned their backs to him and then walked out to protest the plan.

In March 2013, Ellerbe testified at a D.C. City Council hearing in favor of his scheduling plan, which had still not been implemented.

A firefighter sick-out appeared to occur the week of August 18, 2013. Usually, 20 to 30 firefighters call in sick in an average week. But beginning on August 18, 83 firefighters did so. The absences caused the department to require mandatory overtime of 67 firefighters, forcing them to work for 36 straight hours. DCFEMS officials called the illnesses suspicious, while the union said the illnesses showed the department had too few firefighters to cover the schedule. At a press conference on August 26, Ellerbe asserted that the firefighter shortage would be ending soon. He said 60 firefighters would be added to the force by the end of the year. He credited new hires, as well as graduates of the fire training academy, for adding to the force.

As of late August 2013, the two parties were still negotiating over Ellerbe's firefighter scheduling plan.

==== Ambulance scheduling controversy ====
In November 2012, Chief Ellerbe proposed a plan to reduce ambulance service between 1:00 a.m. and 7:00 a.m. and transfer these crews to service between the hours of 7:00 A.M. and noon. Ellerbe said the change would eliminate half of the 42 overnight paramedics and all 14 advanced life support ambulances. The remaining 21 paramedics would ride with fire engines or trucks (which typically respond to medical emergencies also). There would be no change to the 21 to 25 basic life support ambulances available, which are staffed by EMTs. Ellerbe said the city receives about 10 calls per hour overnight, but 20 per hour mornings. The proposal required D.C. City Council approval. The firefighters' union opposed the plan, arguing it would overload firefighters and reduced fire fighting ability. But the paramedics' union (Local 3721, American Federation of Government Employees), supported it.

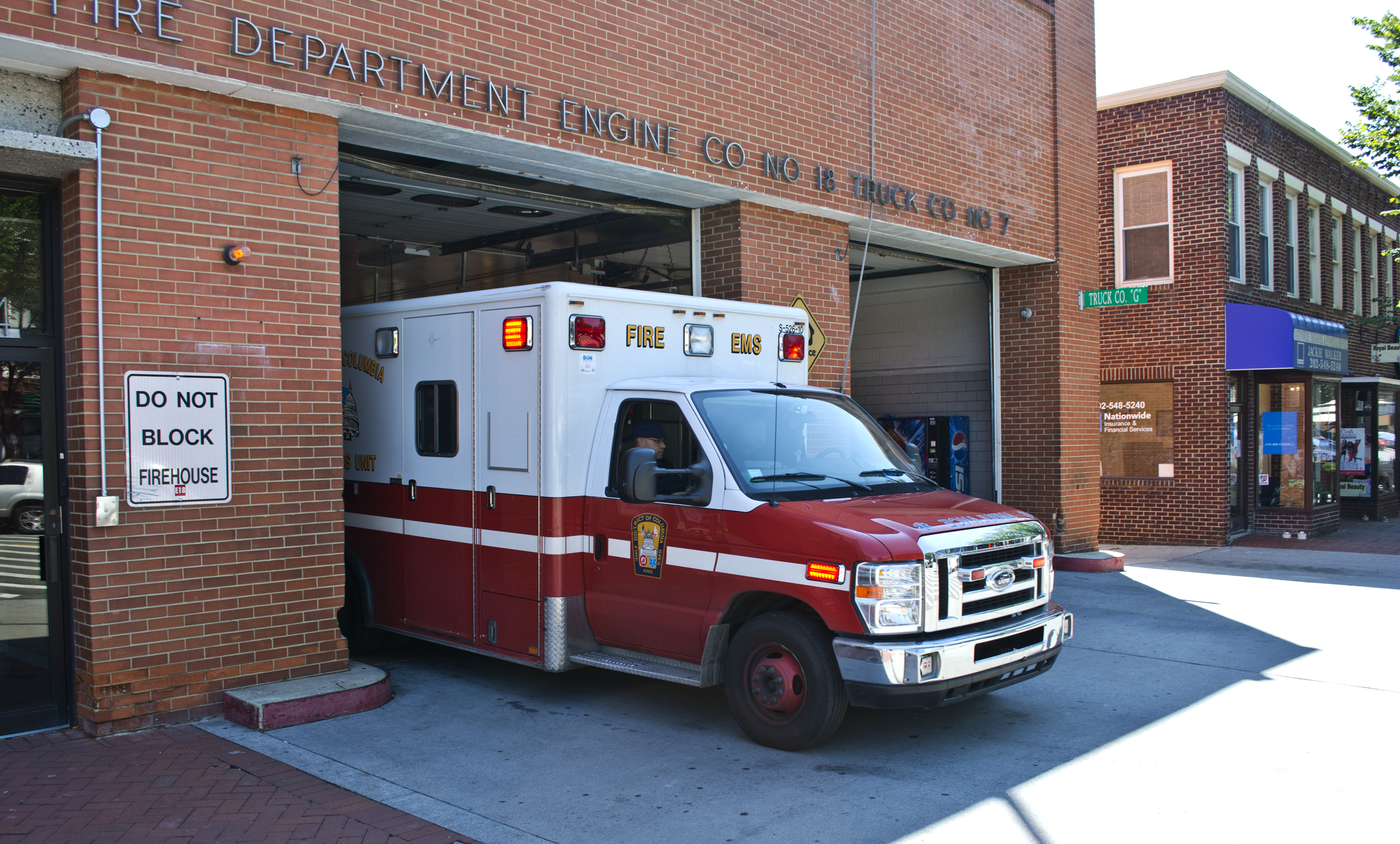
Chief Ellerbe proposed taking ambulances away from the night shift, and putting them on daytime duty, like the crew staffing DCFEMS Ambulance 18.

Ellerbe's plan was not well received by the D.C. City Council or local citizens' groups. At an initial hearing in November 2012, the firefighters' union testified that paramedic vacancies led to staffing downgrades for the 14 overnight advanced life support ambulances, leaving them staffed with EMTs. An average of 4.4 advanced life support ambulances had been downgraded every night in the past year, the union said. Ellerbe dispute those numbers, but provided none on downgrades, saying that the real issue was call volume and not staffing. The D.C. Federation of Citizens Associations, a coalition of neighborhood citizens' groups, testified that similar redeployment plans were tested three times in the late 1980s and did not work. At a second hearing in December 2012, city council public safety committee chair Mendelson expressed frustration with plan, noting that DCFEMS has been unable to say how many paramedics it has on staff. (Ellerbe blamed a software problem for that.) Mendelson also said Ellerbe's plan also didn't seem to take into account scheduled leave, illness, or unforeseen problems.

The plan drew national attention as well. An emergency medical services director from Connecticut said that redeployment was common, but downgrading the quality of care at night was "unusual". Paul Werfel, director of the paramedic program at the University Medical Center at the State University of New York, Stony Brook, said the plan gave commuters better care but provided less to those who lived in the District of Columbia. The severity of the calls should be taken into account, Werfel said, not just the number of calls. A nationwide survey of medical professionals conducted by The Washington Times said Ellerbe's plan would be unique. A DCFEMS spokesperson said the department treated all calls as equally serious. Don Lundy, president-elect of the National Association of Emergency Medical Technicians, praised Ellerbe for his innovativeness, but questioned whether the District should rely on fire engines to transport a single paramedic or EMT. Lundy suggested providing paramedics and EMTs with their own, far less costly vehicles.

Ellerbe backed off the plan in late December 2012. Ellerbe altered the plan so that five rather than zero advanced life support ambulances would remain on duty between 1:00 a.m. and 7:00 a.m.

The ambulance service was rocked by three scandals at the beginning of 2013. In the first, a man suffering a heart attack waited 29 minutes for an ambulance to arrive on December 31, 2012. He later died. In the second, no ambulance could be located to transport a D.C. police officer who was a victim of a hit and run accident in February. An ambulance from Prince George's County, Maryland, had to be dispatched to assist the policeman. DCFEMS had 39 units staffed that night, and 10 were out of service. "A couple" more could not be located by the department. In the third incident, no ambulance could be located in March to transport a patient with a stroke. The individual was transported to a hospital aboard a fire truck. Ellerbe admitted that DCFEMS was at a "tipping point" in terms of staffing (and claimed it had been for two years), and ordered at least two reserve ambulances to be on duty at all times. An investigation revealed that one paramedic and two EMT crews failed to follow procedures and should have been able to respond. The three D.C. crews and a supervisor were disciplined.

Ellerbe asserted that incidents of delayed care were uncommon and infrequent, despite worsening response times. Although improvements recommended by a task force in the wake of the Rosenbaum case had still not been fully implemented, Ellerbe declared that had his staffing plan been in effect the three incidents would not have happened.

The scandals led to a significant reduction in trust placed in the DCFEMS emergency medical services division, and on June 28, 2013, the public safety committee of the D.C. City Council rejected Ellerbe's altered plan.

In August 2013, DCFEMS reported that it had significantly lowered EMS response times in April, May, June, and July 2013. The department said its standard was to respond to a call (e.g., leave the station) within 6.5 minutes 90 percent of the time. The department lowered its response time from 84 percent of the time in February 2013 to 92 percent of the time in June 2013. The response time for critical calls (about half of those received every day) also fell, from 5:03 minutes in February 2013 to 4:02 minutes in June 2013. Ellerbe attributed the improvements to a new protocol that required ambulance crews and firefighter EMTs to submit paperwork justifying the response time every time it exceeded the standard. Ellerbe suggested that some employees were simply not responding very quickly, and noted that at least one employee was disciplined for not being able to justify a slow response time. The firefighters' union complained about the amount of paperwork required, and said crews were sacrificing safety in order to meet the response time standard. The union claimed there had been a sharp rise in minor road accidents since Ellerbe's protocol went into effect, and that some crews were lying when they said they had responded.

Ellerbe announced on August 26 that he would resubmit his ambulance staffing plan to the D.C. City Council for approval. He pointed to 22 new paramedic hires and 20 new ambulances as a sign that the city would be able to provide good quality EMS care during night hours. Wells said the city council should be credited for pushing DCFEMS to improve vehicle purchasing and personnel hiring. But DCFES spokesman Keith St. Clair said the council's criticisms, rejections of Ellerbe's proposals, and publicity about DCFEMS problems had had no effect. St. Clair asserted that Ellerbe began making changes long before the council began its hearings.

The Associated Press reported on November 26 that nine new paramedics were hired by the city, with an employment date of December 2. However, the news agency said, high rates of attrition among DCFEMS paramedics meant that the number of paramedics on duty would not change, nor would the new hires alleviate the shortage of firefighter-paramedics (the first responders to medical emergencies).

==== Arson counting controversy ====
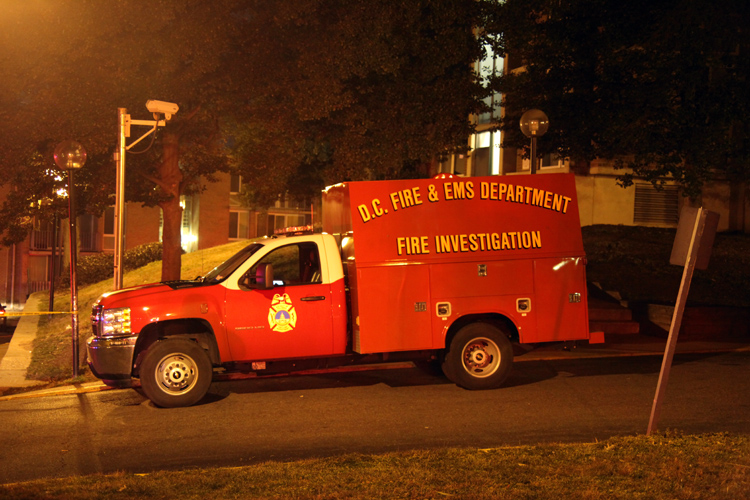
Chief Ellerbe quietly changed the way that DCFEMS counts arson cases, which led to a dispute with the D.C. City Council.

Shortly after Ellerbe assumed control of DCFEMS, the department changed the way it counts arson fires. Under Fire Chief Dennis L. Rubin, any intentionally set fire was considered arson, a definition used by the National Fire Protection Association. A new definition was adopted by DCFEMS in 2011 which required that a "willful, malicious intent to start a fire" must be present. Fire department spokesman Tim Wilson later said the new definition was adopted to "reflect a more detailed analysis of how arson cases are identified and closed". It remained unclear how the department came up with its new definition.

In summer 2012, Deputy Fire Chief Bruce D. Faust, who supervised building inspections and arson investigations, told the D.C. Chief Financial Officer, Natwar Gandhi, that the number of arson cases and how many cases were closed had both dropped significantly in the past year. Faust questioned the accuracy of the most recent numbers, and that the city was not using a consistent definition for counting arson.

On April 17, 2013, Chief Ellerbe testified at a D.C. City Council hearing that his department was solving 72.7 percent of all arson cases, three times the national average. The number of arson cases dropped to 32 in fiscal year 2012 from 154 the year before. Council member Tommy Wells asked Ellerbe if any change in measurement had been made, and Ellerbe said there had "not been much of a change". Ellerbe attributed the markedly lower numbers to more experienced employees and fewer arsons committed. But at the same hearing, Faust told the council that using the old definition, DCFEMS had a 9.6 percent closure rate.

The Washington Post made public the definitional change on April 18. A DCFEMS spokesperson subsequently admitted that the full-year arson closure rate was about 34 percent. Faust told the newspaper that there was no validity to the department's new definition. When the newspaper interviewed Ellerbe about the definitional change, he left the interview without explanation and did not return.

Deputy Mayor for Public Safety and Justice, Paul Quander Jr., defended Ellerbe, saying that the chief had not intended to deceive the council on April 17. Quander also confirmed that a definitional change had occurred. An angry Wells told Quander during a public hearing that Ellerbe should have acknowledged the change and asked for time to provide more data, and that the lackof transparency was deeply troubling at time when the DCFEMS arson unit had a 50 percent vacancy rate and the department had asked to cut two full-time investigators.

==== Vehicle tracking controversy ====
In 2012, DCFEMS began losing track of the location of reserve vehicles, and its internal database of which fire engines were available was inaccurate. The agency hired a consultant at a cost of $182,000 to create an accurate database of vehicle status and location.

In March 2013, The Washington Post reported that DCFEMS could not account for several vehicles, and claimed others were in service or in reserve when they had, in fact, long been scrapped. In a database of equipment submitted by Ellerbe to the D.C. City Council in February 2013, DCFEMS claimed it had 16 active and 13 reserve fire truck companies and 33 active and 32 reserve fire engines. But Local 36, the firefighters' union, conducted its own investigation in which it compared serial numbers on actual equipment to the listings on the database, and discovered two reserve trucks were inactive due to repair, two reserve trucks had been sold, and six reserve engines were either being repaired or had been sold. Ellerbe conceded that the union's inventory was correct, and blamed an out of date database for the problem. The deputy fire chief who compiled the list immediately retired. The broken equipment included Foam 1, a fire fighting foam unit which had been out of service since November 2012. Because Foam 1 was assigned to protect helicopter landings by the Vice President of the United States, the city was forced to ask the United States Navy for the loan of its foam unit to cover his landings. Council member Wells, the new chair of the city's committee on public safety and the judiciary, said he had lost confidence in the information provided by DCFEMS, that the department had not been forthcoming with its answers, and that additional hearings would be needed on the issue. Although The Washington Post said that the city needed new fire equipment worth tens of millions of dollars, Ellerbe denied any such need and said he had in place an "aggressive" plan to all the needed vehicles.

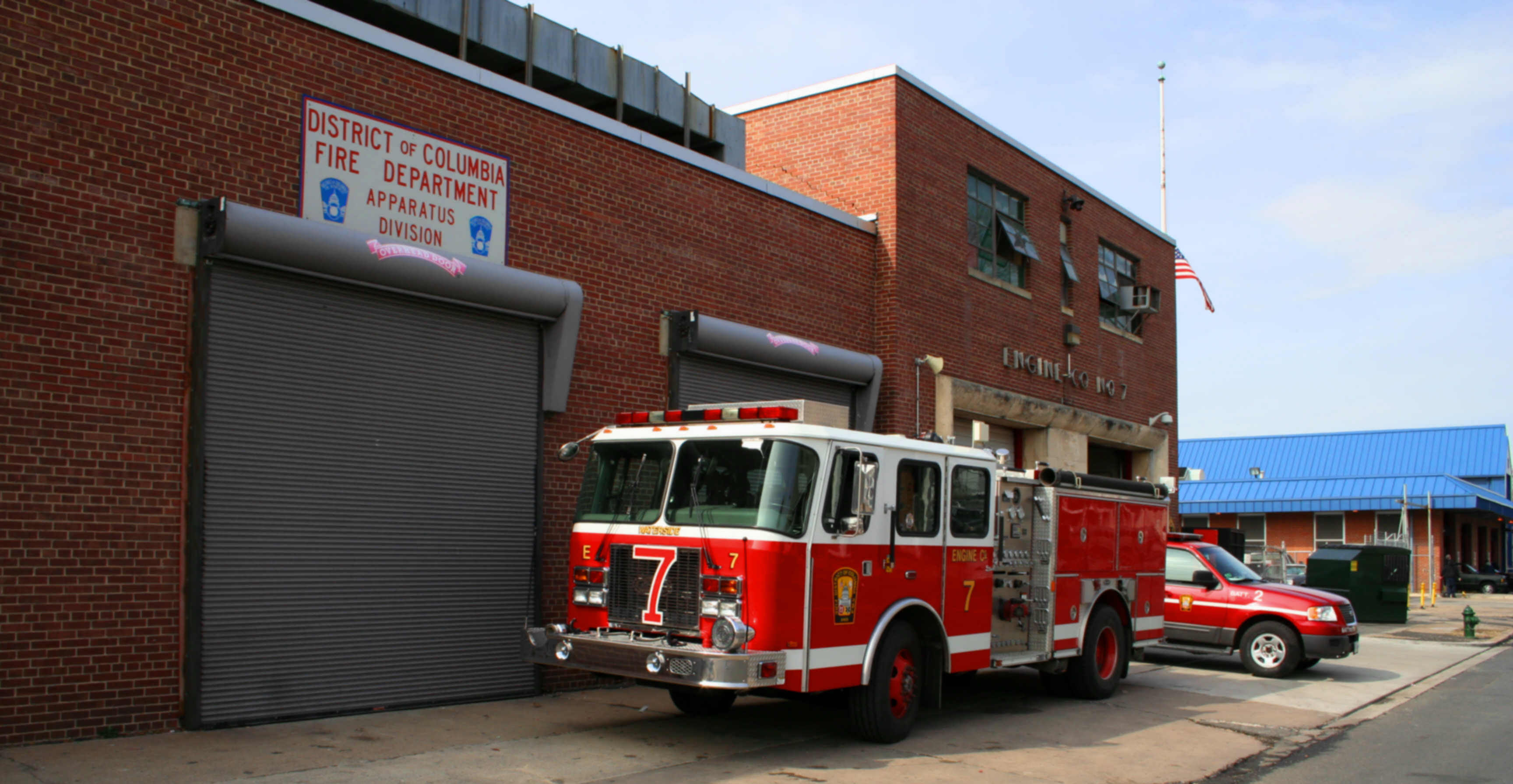
A DCFEMS fire engine outside the department's repair facility on M Street SW.

The day after the hearing, DCFEMS announced that two ambulances had completed repairs and were returned to active duty. But the paramedic assigned to the vehicle found it had been stripped of all its equipment, including its stretcher.

In the week following the hearing, the firefighter's union voted 300 to 37 that it had "no confidence" in Ellerbe's leadership. Deputy Mayor Quander, however, reiterated that he had very strong confidence in Ellerbe.

On March 22, the D.C. Inspector General found more discrepancies in DCFEMs' vehicle readiness. It pointed to a July 12, 2012, incident in which DCFEMS said all 12 reserve fire engines were ready for duty. In fact, only one engine was ready. The same day, the department listed 31 ambulances in reserve and active for duty, but only 10 were ready for service. (Three ambulances listed as ready had been out of service for more than 36 months, 21 months, and nine months.) The inspector general further reported that front-line supervisors knew there was an inadequate reserve fleet, and had complained to assistant and deputy chiefs without success; that firefighters were "routinely" sent home because there were too few vehicles; and that the quality of repairs to fire trucks and engines was poor. The inspector general also found that air conditioners in ambulances frequently failed, creating closed-door temperatures of 120 degrees Fahrenheit or more. The high heat often left paramedics ill, and reduced the quality of service provided to city residents. The Washington City Paper called the "dysfunction and incompetence surrounding the department's fleet management system...more than a little frightening. If D.C. were to suffer 'large-scale emergencies or mass casualty events,' the department would not have the reserve equipment needed to respond".

The five-hour hearing was a contentious one. Council member Tommy Wells, chair of the committee on public safety, called Ellerbe's answers about vehicle readiness "vague", and The Washington Post reported that Ellerbe "repeatedly faltered" while answering. When pressed, Ellerbe could not even say if he had visited the DCFEMS 9-1-1 emergency call center. Ellerbe turned for help from Deputy Mayor Paul Quander so often that Wells rebuked Ellerbe and demanded that Ellerbe (not Quander) respond. D.C. City Council chairman Phil Mendelson expressed shock that the city had to rely on reports from the firefighters' union and D.C. Inspector General's office for accurate information on the department, and rhetorically asked how Ellerbe cannot track 411 vehicles when the D.C. police can keep accurate track of 4,000 cars, trucks, and motorcycles. Ellerbe apologized to the council at the hearing for submitting inaccurate data on the fleet. But Wells warned Ellerbe that he should be prepared to quit unless he could guarantee the accuracy of the information the department provides. Despite the faulty vehicle data, Ellerbe said his capital request ($24 million for fiscal 2014, 2015, and 2016) did not need revision.

At the March 2013 hearing, Ellerbe also accused his department's mechanics and rank-and-file firefighters of purposefully sabotaging equipment. He cited the D.C. Inspector General's report of February 2013, which said there had been allegations of sabotage (including driving vehicles in low gear to damage transmissions, slashing tires, and tampering with air conditioners). The following month, Ellerbe claimed he had complete confidence in the repair personnel at DCFEMS.

The vehicle tracking and maintenance issue had not improved by August 2013. The Washington Post reported that the Ellerbe never ordered the 16 fire engines and seven ladder trucks which he said were needed in 2011. Ellerbe blamed the city council and an unspecified dispute with a vendor for the two-and-a-half year delay. He also asserted that six new fire engines and two new ladder trucks had been ordered, but did not say how long it would be until they arrived. The newspaper also reported that Ellerbe had yet to fix the vehicular tracking database problem. The department spent $160,000 on a consultant to inventory the department's equipment, but no permanent staff person had been hired to oversee the project and keep it going.

==== Ambulance maintenance controversy ====
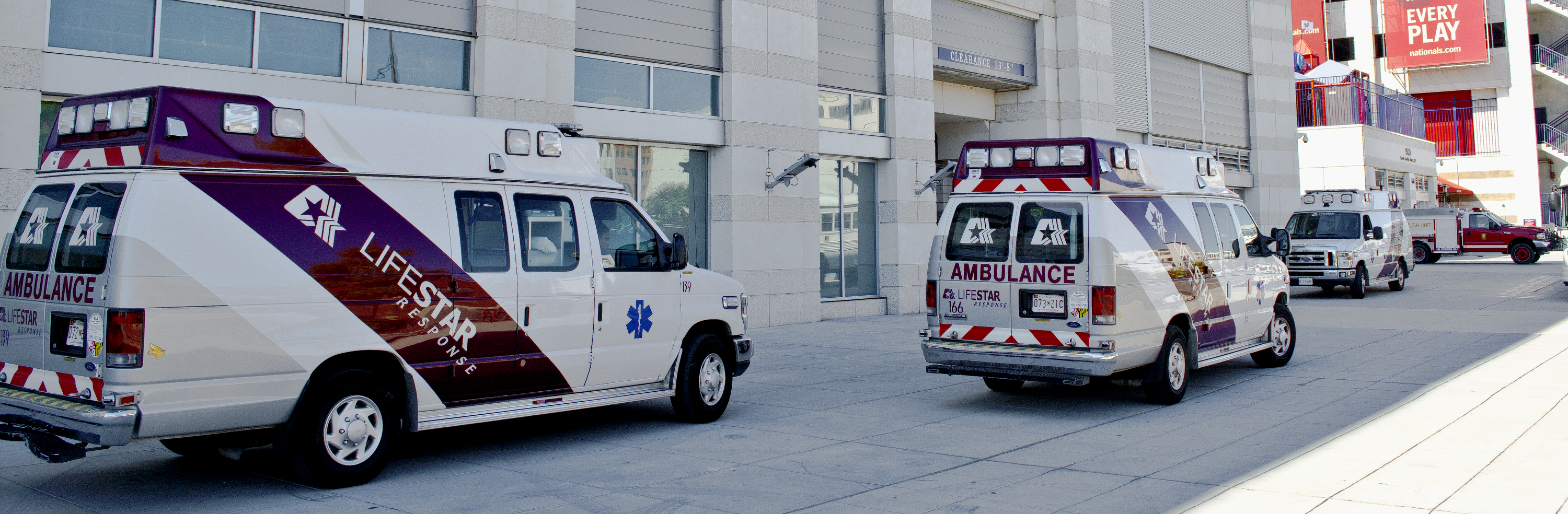
Three Lifestar ambulances at a Washington Nationals game on September 17, 2013. DCFEMS has so few ambulances, it has contracted with private companies since early July 2013 to provide EMS coverage at local sporting events.

Maintenance problems with DCFEMS ambulances were known to the department as early as 2011. In July 2012, widespread failure of ambulance air conditioning units became common. A D.C. Inspector General's report in March 2013 clearly identified the problem, and reported it to Mayor Gray and to the D.C. City Council.

In April 2013, Ellerbe faced questions about the department's maintenance of its ambulance fleet. When asked if the fleet was ready for Washington's hot summer, Ellerbe said the department was proactively inspecting all air conditioning units and fixing those with problems. "I'm confident in our equipment and I'm confident in our personnel," he said.

Little was done about the ambulance maintenance problem, however, and it created significant problems in summer 2013. Air conditioning in 22 of the city's 94 ambulances broke down in June 2013. To provide adequate coverage at events at the Verizon Center and at Nationals Park (home of Major League Baseball's Washington Nationals), DCFEMS hired two private companies (American Medical Response and Lifestar Ambulance Service). The cost of the outsourcing could not be estimated. Deputy Mayor for Public Safety Paul Quander said there was no emergency, and that the city would spend several weeks evaluating the situation first. During the weekend of July 19–21, only 37 ambulances were available—forcing DCFEMS to send 16 ambulances for repair at the District of Columbia Department of Public Works and another six to the District of Columbia Water and Sewer Authority. DCFEMS announced on July 23, 2013, that it had hired an auditor at the cost of $180,000 to examine its fleet maintenance practices, and that the delivery of 13 new ambulances in August would alleviate the problem with breakdowns.

In July 2013, the ambulance repair problem worsened. More than two-thirds of the entire ambulance fleet (67 vehicles) needed repair of some kind between July 19 and July 26. Of these, 22 ambulances needed repairs twice. Fourteen ambulances were still out of service as of August 7. DCFEMS admitted that it had spent $50,000 so far on outsourcing, and the city admitted that it had asked George Washington University Hospital to help it meet needs. (The hospital agreed to do so at no cost, because it had a "mutual aid" agreement with the city.) Once more, Deputy Mayor Quander said there was no emergency, and that several more weeks of evaluation would be needed. Chief Ellerbe also told the press that delivery of the 13 expected ambulances was delayed for unspecified reasons. However, he also said the city might purchase as many as 33 new ambulances. But firefighters' union president Ed Smith said he believed DCFEMS did not have an equipment replacement schedule, and the city kept getting caught by surprised when vehicles wore out.

On August 1, Ellerbe claimed an "unprecedented" number of new ambulances would be received by DCFEMS in fiscal year 2014 (which began September 1, 2013). The department usually receives about 10 new ambulances a year, but Ellerbe declined to say how many vehicles the department will actually receive in fiscal 2014.

On August 2, a DCFEMS ambulance caught fire outside Washington Hospital Center. An internal DCFEMS report found that the battery (which was not original to the vehicle) had an electrical problem which caused the fire. About $5,000 in damage was done to the $120,000 vehicle.

The ambulance maintenance issue made national headlines on August 12, 2013, when a DCFEMS ambulance that was part of President Barack Obama's motorcade ran out of gas on the South Lawn of the White House. EMS personnel said they reported a broken fuel gauge months ago, while DCFEMS said workers failed to fill the vehicle with gasoline.

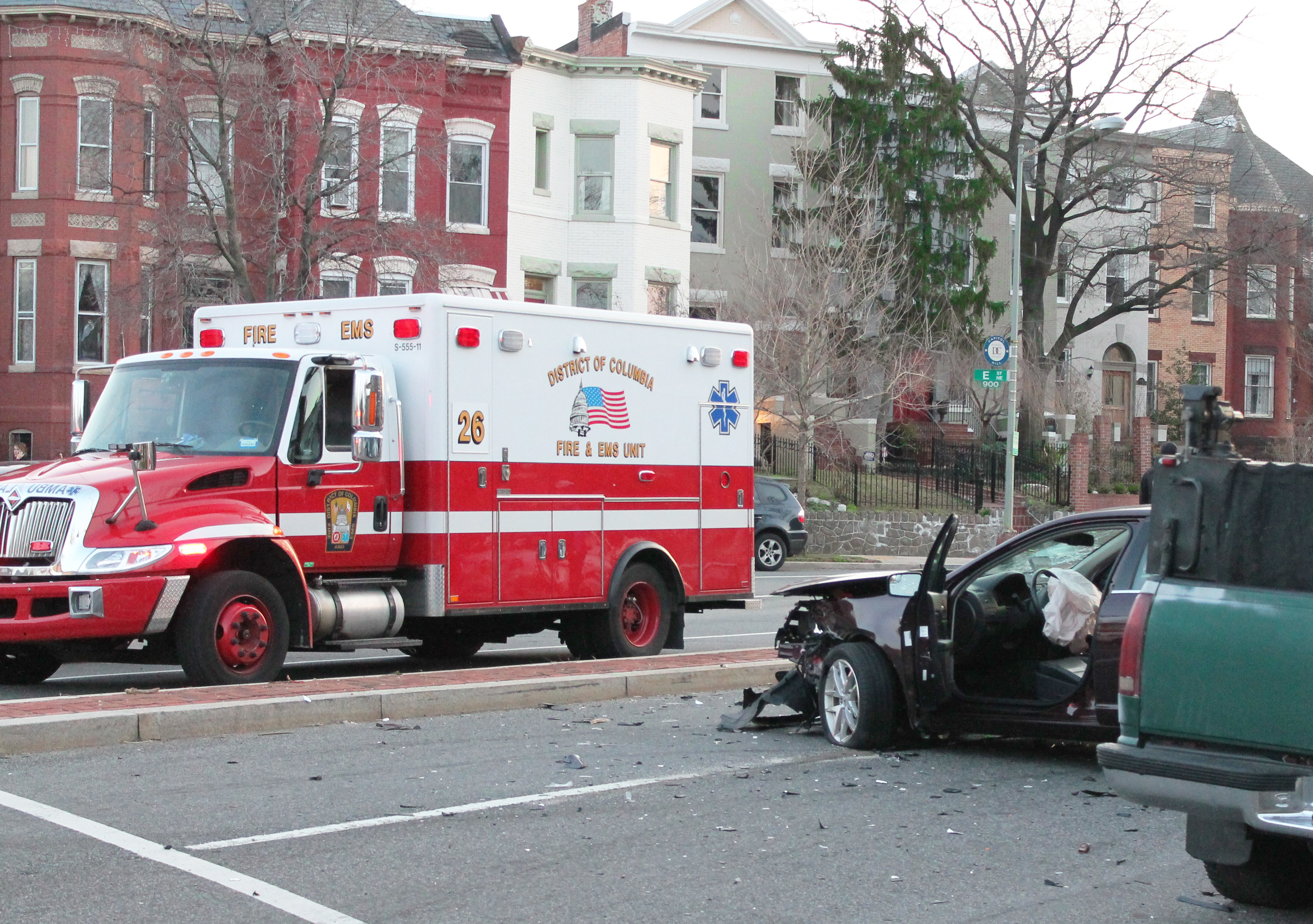
A DCFEMS ambulance responds to a vehicular accident in Washington, D.C.

On August 13, 2013, two DCFEMS ambulances caught fire—one while delivering a patient a Washington Hospital Center, the other while responding to an emergency call at an apartment building on Benning Road SE. (Another ambulance was dispatched to take the patient to the hospital.) The firefighters union argued the problem arose from poor management, while DCFEMS said the problems either cannot be accounted for or are the result of rank-and-file incompetence or neglect. An image of the burning ambulance outside the apartment building made its way onto the Internet and received widespread distribution nationally.

In the wake of the fires, firefighters' union president Edward Smith called for a National Transportation Safety Board investigation of the department fleet.

DCFEMS also asked the D.C. police to investigate whether arson was the cause of the ambulance fires. Deputy Mayor Paul Quander called two ambulance fires on the same day suspicious and asked the police to investigate to ensure that "nothing untoward is happening". Quander declined to elaborate on what he meant, and the firefighters' union denounced his statement as a slur on workers. But on August 16, a preliminary investigation determined that both fires were likely accidental. Investigators discovered that DCFEMS maintenance crews (with management approval) were attempting to fix overheating vehicle air conditioners by cutting up aluminum signs and using them as heat shields. DCFEMS superiors ordered the "heat shields" removed after the revelation. Police arson investigators then learned that Medic 27 (which caught fire at the apartment building) had ongoing maintenance issues and that its air conditioner repeatedly failed. The investigation determined that the fire started near the air conditioner (although it did not determine exactly which piece of equipment failed and caused the fire), and concluded the fire was accidental. Medic 27, a 2006 vehicle in the reserve fleet, suffered $25,000 in damage. The second "fire" was not a fire but merely smoke issuing from under the hood of the ambulance. D.C police arson investigators found a small plastic container of transmission fluid stored in the engine compartment, which began smoking after being heated by the constantly-running engine. Because no actual fire occurred, the report did not conclude whether the container was placed there accidentally.

On August 19, The Washingtonian magazine reported on its Web site that Chief Ellerbe had an alleged confrontation with a firefighter over a picture taken of the burning Medic 27 vehicle. According to the report, Ellerbe arrived at the scene of the ambulance fire and noticed a firefighter with a smartphone in his hand. The magazine said that Ellerbe demanded that the firefighter hand over camera phone, grabbed it from the firefighter's hand, looked it over, and returned it. Ellerbe denied the incident categorically, saying he went to the scene of the fire only because "I thought my presence would initiate a faster response in removing the vehicle from public view". He requested the phone, and the firefighter willingly handed it over. Ellerbe says that when he saw the phone was not functioning, he returned it immediately. The magazine did not identify the firefighter who made the accusation. However, Ellerbe requested and received an internal investigation into the accusation. However, a week later, firefighter Sean C. Griffith, filed a criminal complaint with the D.C. police alleging that Ellerbe assaulted him, causing him harm that required him to seek medical treatment and spend more than a week on sick leave. A spokesman for Deputy Mayor Paul Quander called the allegation suspect and accused the firefighters' union of fabricating the incident to embarrass the department.

In late August 2013, DCFEMS took delivery of 14 new and six refurbished ambulances. These were the first ambulances the city received since 10 were purchased earlier in Ellerbe's tenure. Ellerbe admitted that his department was still far behind on the replacement schedule for ambulances (which typically have a three-year lifespan). Another 10 new ambulances were on order.

==== Paramedic staffing scandal ====
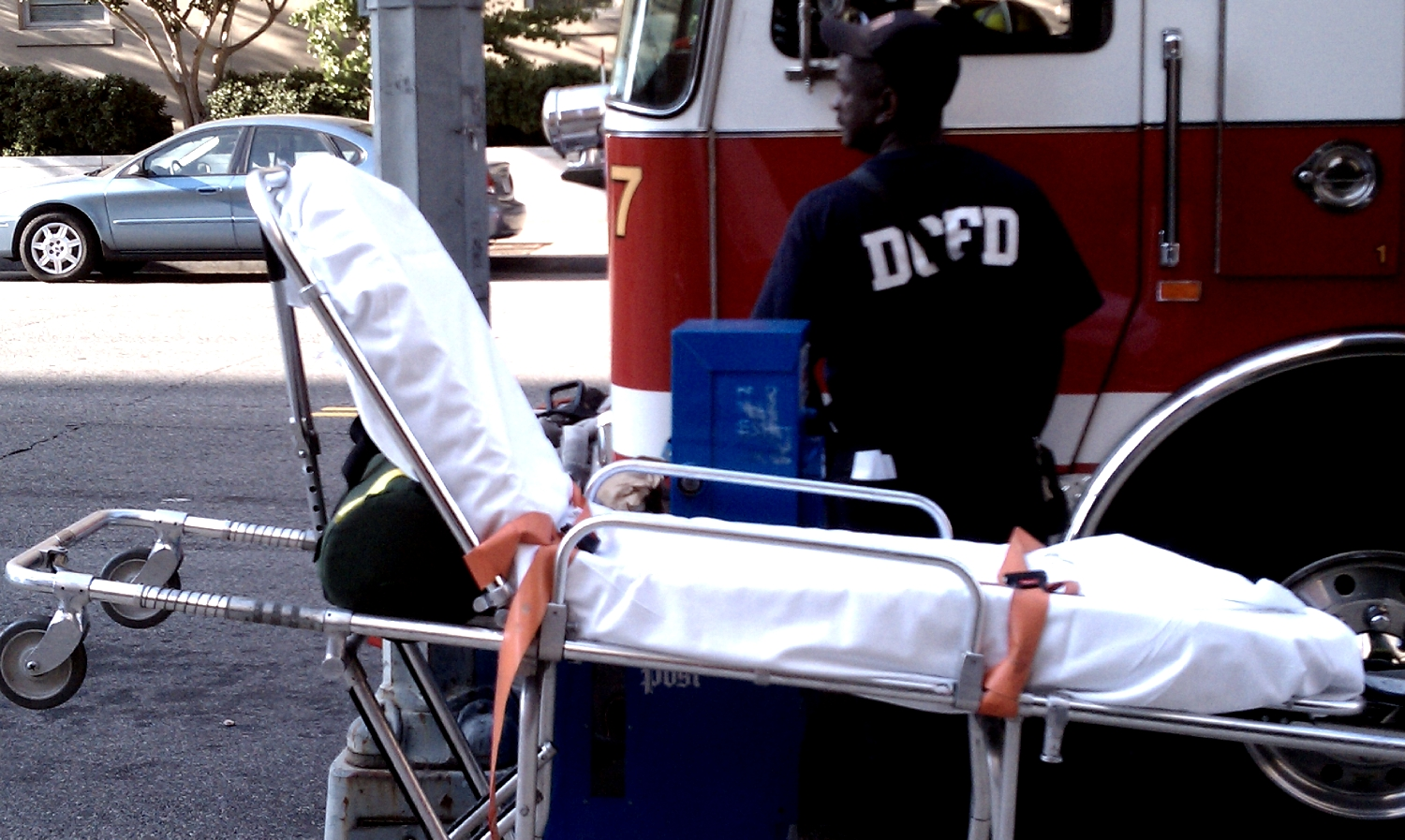
DCFEMS has struggled to hire and retain paramedics and EMTs, leading to various staffing proposals to cover shifts.

In addition to the ambulance mechanical problems, DCFEMS began having trouble staffing its ambulances properly in 2012 as well. The firefighters' union accused Ellerbe of mismanaging the emergency services division (which includes both paramedics and EMTs), and said that 37 emergency medical staff quit between January 2011 and December 2012. In December 2012, during hearings on the issue, City Council member Mendelson said that DCFEMS could not accurately determine how many paramedics and EMTs it had on staff, as departmental figures provided various numbers between 225 and 250.

The dispute over staffing number continued into February 2012. The union claimed 20 paramedics quit DCFEMS in calendar 2011, while the agency said it was 12.

By late summer, the paramedic staff was chronically understaffed. The firefighters' union claimed that 53 paramedics had quit since Ellerbe took over as Fire Chief, and none were replaced. The union claimed DCFEMS was using mandatory overtime to force paramedics to work a second 12-hour shift in order to cover staffing needs. There were 185 cases of mandatory overtime in 2012, the union asserted, and 411 cases in the first seven months of 2013. The department blamed staffing woes on workers taking too much unscheduled leave. During the weekend of August 9 to 12, 2013, almost two-thirds of the department's advanced life support ambulances were staffed by EMTs due to a shortage of paramedics. Most of the EMTs were firefighters, not "civilians" (e.g., EMTs who were not trained as firefighters). During one work-week in August, so few paramedics were on duty that fewer than half of the city's 128 advanced life support ambulances were available. (The city staff the ambulances with EMTs who were not certified to use the drugs, advanced equipment, or medical supplies on board the ALS ambulances.) Another 60 fire engines went without paramedic firefighters as well, and no one could be found to staff 15 paramedic supervisor shifts. Phil Mendelson, now the chairman of the City Council, said the fire department was "an embarrassment to the city" and that a large segment of the public believes "there is a meltdown going on" in DCFEMS. But Deputy Mayor for Public Safety Quander continued to voice his support for Ellerbe.

To handle the paramedic shortage, Deputy Mayor Paul Quander announced a major shift in DCFEMS hiring policy in mid-August. In the past, the city always hired paramedics who were also firefighters. Quander said that the city would now hire "civilian" paramedics—those who were not also trained as firefighters. Because of long-standing animosity between the firefighter and EMS divisions (which had different pay, fringe benefit, and scheduling differences), the city had a policy of hiring only firefighter-trained paramedics. "Civilian" paramedics were lost through attrition. However, DCFEMS gave no indication of when "civilian" paramedic hiring would begin, or how many it would hire. However, The Washington Post reported that the policy change allowed the city to hire 22 paramedics within just a few days, a 10 percent increase in staffing levels. The Associated Press, however, reported that just nine of the 22 would be working by the end of the year. Nonetheless, Ellerbe declared, "Earlier this year, the department's ability to respond to emergency medical calls was at a tipping point. We're now in a position to turn the corner".

The Associated Press, however, took issue with Ellerbe's assessment. The news agency reported that 40 paramedics left the department during Ellerbe's tenure, but just two had been hired in the same period. It also reported that "the new hires and equipment still leave the District of Columbia well short of the staffing levels in similar-sized cities". Whereas most similarly-situated EMS departments deployed more than 70 paramedics per shift, DCFEMS had just 35—and 21 of those were not riding ambulances (with their life-saving equipment) but riding on fire engines. DCFEMS officials said they had no plan to increase the number of paramedics per shift. The firefighters' union said the short staffing meant that roughly five of the 14 advanced life support ambulances available each day were downgraded to basic life support because they were staffed only with EMTs. They also said incidents of mandatory overtime were increasing because there were so few paramedics.

The abandonment of cross-training (a key reform in the wake of the Rosenbaum scandal in 2006) was decried by Council member Wells. Although the EMS/firefighter merger had cross-trained less than half the city's paramedics as firefighters, advocates of cross-training said that it reduced firefighter-EMS and racial tension and added EMS capacity to DEFEMS.

==== Retaliatory employee punishment controversy ====
Ellerbe retaliated or allegedly retaliated several times against department employees who criticized him.

In July 2011, Captain Edward C. Smith, the firefighters' union president, spoke to the press about Ellerbe's decision to shorten pregnancy leave. Within hours, Ellerbe told Smith that he was "displeased" with the comments and that Smith would "pay for it". Ten days later, Smith was transferred to a job that paid less and had less responsibility. Smith filed a grievance with the D.C. Office of Employee Appeals. In February 2012, DCFEMS workers painted over the "DCFD" logo at Engine Co. 7 where Smith worked. No other fire stations were altered. In November 2012, an arbitrator ruled that Ellerbe illegally retaliated against Smith. The arbitrator also strongly criticized Ellerbe for trying to manufacture evidence against Smith, and for supplying a false rationale for Smith's transfer. When the arbitrator's ruling was made public, D.C. City Council chair Phil Mendelson called Ellerbe's action "not good for the department" and decried the worsening tension between the fire chief and the firefighters' union.

In April 2012, two firefighters and a lieutenant in a station in Northeast D.C. were reported to have accepted a case of beer from a grateful local resident. Ellerbe asked Battalion Chief Richard Sterne to suspend the firefighters. But after Sterne discovered that the men had rejected the gift, but the resident left it behind anyway, he reprimanded the two firefighters and did not suspend them. On April 8, Ellerbe demoted Sterne to captain, writing, "Your failure to hold the members accountable for their receipt of the beer in violation of the Rules of Conduct brings into question your ability to exercise proper judgment in the performance of your assigned duties". Sterne filed an appeal with the D.C. Office of Employee Appeals. The lieutenant's case was handled by Battalion Chief Kevin Sloan, who ruled that the lieutenant was not guilty because he was not present when the gift was delivered. Ellerbe subsequently transferred Sloan from active duty to a desk job in April 2012, although he gave no reason for the transfer. Sloan called the action retaliatory and said Ellerbe engaged in "workplace bullying". Sloan, too, filed an appeal.

Legal expert Curt Varone called Ellerbe's actions retaliatory and "almost beyond belief":

Here is the bottom line: In DC the fire chief is the final decision maker on matters of discipline. If the fire chief does not like recommendations that his subordinate chiefs give him, he should IGNORE THEM. He is the fire chief and that is his prerogative to overrule their decisions by issuing what ever punishment he believes is warranted. But to punish fact finders for disagreeing with him? What message does that send?

Another alleged retaliation came in July 2012. Lieutenant Robert Alvarado gave an interview to a local D.C. television station in which he discussed his dissatisfaction with Ellerbe's decisions regarding the DCFEMS logo and the stored polo shirts. Ellerbe demanded that Alvarado be suspended for a month for speaking to the media without authorization. Suspensions of more than three days must be determined by a trial board, and in July 2012 the trial board found Alvarado guilty. He was suspended for 22 days. After serving the suspension, Alvarado was transferred from active duty to the DCFEMS fire training academy. He also filed an appeal with the D.C. Office of Employee Appeals.

==== Other controversies ====
A number of other, smaller controversies have occupied DCFEMS during Ellerbe's tenure as Fire Chief.

Training problems under previous fire chiefs became apparent under Ellerbe as well. In 2011, the firefighters' union criticized the chief for cutting back on training, which it said had seen a sharp drop in the past year. The issue arose again in August 2012. Five firefighters were injured during a fire at 48th Place NE in April 2011, and a 500-page investigation of the incident found that training was poor, equipment old or insufficient, and firefighting protocols lax or inadequate. Additionally, the report urged the department to establish a database of abandoned buildings, buy more thermal imaging cameras, and add oral and intranasal pain-killing medications to ambulances. Most of the recommendations in the report had been suggested previously, but never implemented.

In late 2012, Ellerbe stopped granting requests for interviews.

On December 31, 2012, an apparent sick-out occurred. In early December 2012, Mayor Gray announced bonuses for all city workers except police and firefighters. On New Year's Eve, more than 100 firefighters, paramedics, and EMTs unexpectedly called in sick. Usually, about 20 of the 440 firefighters on duty call in sick each day. DCFEMS confirmed that some firetrucks sat idle due to low staffing. The city accused the firefighters' and paramedics' unions of organizing an illegal wildcat strike, while both unions denied it. The incident led to a number of off-duty staff being called in, significant overtime, and delayed care.

Then on February 19, DCFEMS firefighters accepted an invitation by the White House to stand with President Obama in a press conference that discussed the effect budget sequestration would have on emergency services in the nation. While other jurisdictions praised their firefighters for appearing, Ellerbe "scolded" his for appearing without permission from either the Fire Chief's office or the mayor's office. When Wells questioned him if any firefighter had been punished for the appearance, Ellerbe said no. But he did say new protocols were being established to prevent such actions from occurring in the future. Ellerbe's action in the White House incident led Smith to boycott a mayoral luncheon congratulating fire and EMS workers for their achievements during the 2013 presidential inauguration.

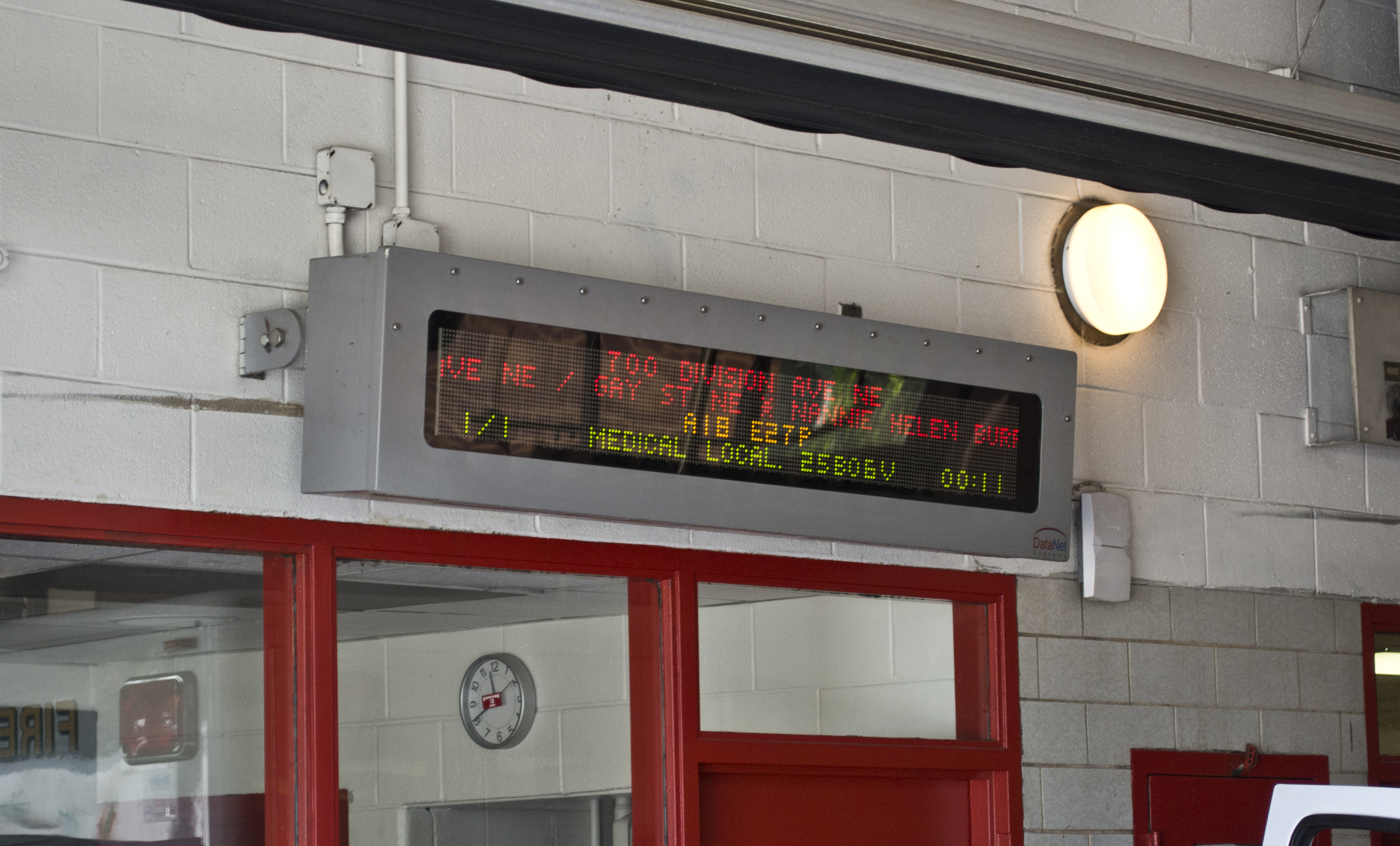
Ambulances response times to alerts through the DCFEMS alert system (depicted) declined in 2012.

On March 2, 2013, two more controversies welled up at a city council hearing. The first was more than $97,000 in overtime payments to 10 DCFEMS mechanics in fiscal 2012. Ellerbe blamed front-line managers, who allowed too many workers to take leave and then approved too much overtime. He promised new protocols to ensure it did not recur. The second were accusations of sexual harassment made by two female cadets at the DCFEMS fire training academy against male colleagues. Ellerbe said management "reacted quickly" to the incident, but committee on public safety chair Tommy Wells asked for a D.C. inspector general investigation. Ellerbe spent part of his testimony at the hearing discussing much improved ambulance response times. But a week later, on March 9, Ellerbe was forced to admit that ambulance response times were poor.

On March 10, Deputy Mayor Quander was once more forced to reaffirm his support for Ellerbe.

Despite the wide array of problems in the department, Mayor Gray's office bestowed an "A+" rating on DCFEMS' performance in April 2013.

The award was part of the "Grade D.C". initiative, designed to rate every city agency on how it meets its goals. The contractor which ran the program for the city later said that three Tweets and seven online reviews (all provided by the public) on the Grade D.C. Web site were the only data used in generating the A+ score.

In late June 2013, Mayor Gray again said that he supports Ellerbe. Alan Suderman, author if the highly influential "Loose Lips" political column at the Washington City Paper, said that Gray's support for Ellerbe was baffling, given the mayor's willingness to fire other high-level administration appointees for far less. Suderman also reported that several senior-level Gray administration officials believe Ellerbe should have been fired long ago.

On July 1, City Council member Mary Cheh called for Ellerbe to resign. She was the first council member to do so. Council member Wells, now running for mayor in 2014, said he would replace Ellerbe if elected.

By mid-August 2013, the relationship between Ellerbe and his rank-and-file workers had degenerated into what Washington Post columnist Mike DeBonis called "civil war". Ellerbe's predecessor, Dennis L. Rubin, accused Ellerbe of "greatly compromis[ing]" the department, imposing "rapid and poorly planned changes", and fabricating information about departmental performance. Rubin's comments, made to the magazine Fire Engineering, were more widely reported by The Washington Post. Rubin said he made the statements because Ellerbe repeatedly blamed him for the department's troubles, although D.C. City Council member Phil Mendelson questioned Rubin's veracity.

On August 26, Mayor Gray held a special press conference to announce the delivery of new vehicles and staff at DCFEMS, and reaffirmed again his support for Ellerbe. "I am really pleased with the progress he has made," Gray said. "The department is being managed well". Ellerbe stated that he had no intention of resigning from the department, either.

On September 10, 2013, DCFEMS again failed to provide timely ambulance service to an injured D.C. police officer. A call was placed to DCFEMS to provide an ambulance at about 3:52 or 3:53 P.M. A fire truck reached the scene first, and an advanced life support ambulance was then summoned. It left its station at 3:55 p.m. After it did not arrive, a basic life support ambulance was dispatched at 4:06 p.m., arriving two minutes later. The advanced life support ambulance arrived after the officer had been taken to the hospital. The advanced life support ambulance was 4 miles (6.4 km) away and needed 15 minutes to reach the site of the incident. A DCFEMS spokesperson could not explain why there were no advanced life support ambulances any closer to the incident. However, the department admitted that half the city's advanced life support ambulances were downgraded to basic life support on September 10 due to severe shortages of personnel trained to use their advance life-saving equipment. (The department relies on lesser-trained EMTs to staff ambulances when there are too few paramedics.)

On January 25, 2014, 77-year-old Medric "Cecil" Mills, Jr., a lifelong resident of D.C., collapsed after suffering a massive heart attack in the parking lot of a Northeast D.C. shopping center, across the street from a fire station. Her daughter Marie Mills ran to his side to check on him. Bystanders called 911 and ran across the street to the firehouse for help, but rescuers inside ignored their calls. An ambulance that was supposed to be dispatched to the scene was sent to the wrong quadrant of the city, Northwest instead of Northeast D.C. Marie said she believed it took "at least 15 minutes for help to arrive." Medric later died.

=== Post-Ellerbe era ===
Fire Chief Kenneth B. Ellerbe announced on June 3, 2014, that he would resign effective July 2, 2014. The Washington Post noted that Ellerbe's staunchest defender, Mayor Vincent Gray, lost the Democratic primary for mayor, and would not stand for reelection. The two frontrunners in the mayoral race, Muriel Bowser and David Catania, said they would not retain Ellerbe if they took office. Assistant Chief Eugene Jones was named Interim Fire Chief.

Muriel E. Bowser was sworn in as the seventh Mayor of the District of Columbia on January 2, 2015. On March 2, 2015, Mayor Bowser named Gregory Dean as Chief of the District of Columbia Fire and Emergency Medical Services Department. Dean previously served for 10 years as the Fire EMS Chief for Seattle, Washington.

Chief Dean's primary focus would be stabilizing emergency medical services, boosting the department’s understaffed ranks, addressing the increasing call volume, improving training for patient care, improving vehicle fleet reliability and improving operational safety.

In June 2015, Jullette M. Saussy was selected to serve as the medical director of DC Fire and EMS. On January 29, 2016, just months after her appointment, she announced her resignation from that position in a letter to Mayor Muriel Bowser. In her letter, she called the department's culture "highly toxic to the delivery of any semblance of quality pre-hospital medical care."

Dr. Robert P. Holman was appointed as the Interim Medical Director effective on February 16, 2016. Dr. Holman would ultimately be retained as the permanent Medical Director and is currently the Department’s longest-serving Medical Director.

Chief Dean communicated his vision, the Department's progress and it's challenges to the community in a letter published in the Washington Post on February 19, 2016 - A changing D.C. Fire and EMS Department will make the city safer.

Starting in March 2016, the Fire and Emergency Medical Services Department (FEMS) began using American Medical Response (AMR), now renamed Global Medical Response (GMR), to supplement patient transport services. AMR-GMR provides BLS patient transport services upon request from FEMS first responders.

Dr. Holman immediately went to work on improving EMS training, improving and expanding the EMS Continuous Quality Improvement (CQI) Office, and led the transition to criteria-based dispatching.

Dr. Holman would go on to establish the nation's largest 911 Nurse Triage Line (NTL), institute quarterly paramedic training symposiums, re-organize and reestablish the Department's Public Health / Street Calls Mobile Integrated Health Team, and improve the Department's Controlled Medication Program.

Dr. Holman was also responsible for the co-development of DC's Sobering and Stabilization Center which opened for operation in October 2023.

Most recently, in April 2024, the Department implemented a program to provide whole blood transfusions in the field. This program was implemented with support of the American Red Cross and the George Washington University Hospital’s blood bank. DC Fire and EMS is using “universal: low-titer type-O whole blood when it transfuses eligible patients suffering from hemorrhagic shock. Transfusion of patients by DC Fire and EMS increases the chance of surviving a devastating blood loss injury - more than doubling the odds of surviving and making it home from the hospital.

== Roll of Honor ==
The District of Columbia Fire and EMS Department has added 101 names to its Roll of Honor, including two people who were not paid members: Benjamin C. Greenup, representing the volunteers who died before the formation of the paid department; and William W. Hoake, a Civil Defense Auxiliary firefighter who was assigned to Engine 31 during World War II.
