= Kenneth B. Ellerbe =

American fire chief (1960–2022)

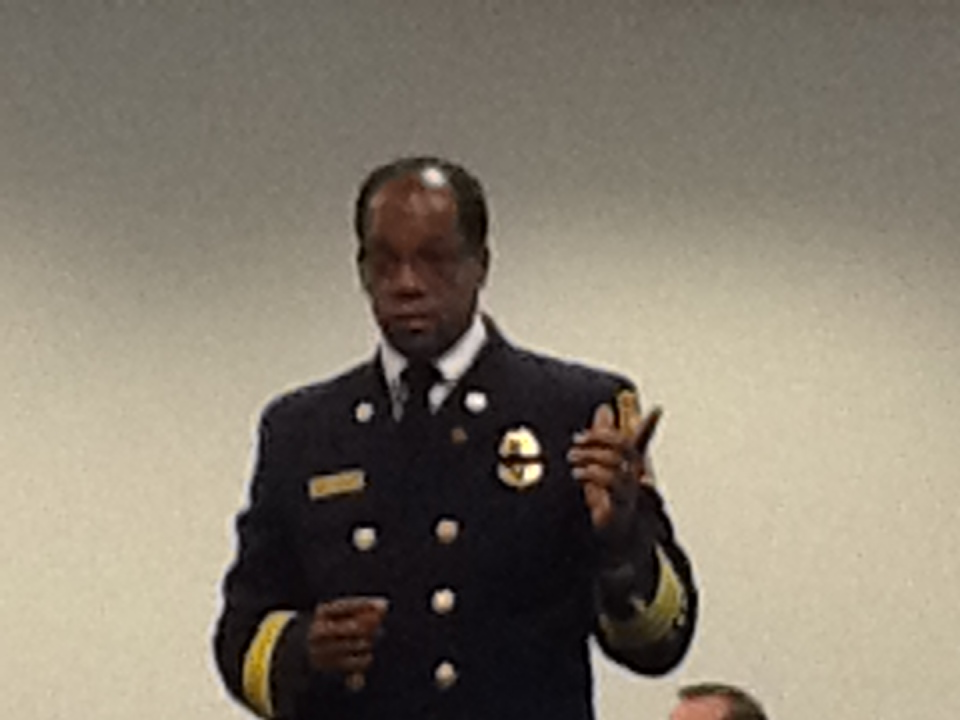
- Ellerbe speaking in Washington in 2013

Fire Chief of the District of Columbia Fire & EMS Department
- In office January 1, 2011 – July 2, 2014
- Appointed by: Vincent C. Gray

Fire Chief of Sarasota County
- In office August 2009 – December 2010

Personal details
- Born: April 10, 1960 Washington, D.C., U.S.
- Died: February 27, 2022 (aged 61) Washington, D.C., U.S.
- Children: 2
- Education: University of the District of Columbia (BS, MPA)

Kenneth B. Ellerbe (April 10, 1960 – February 27, 2022) was an American firefighter who served as the fire chief of the District of Columbia Fire & EMS Department from January 1, 2011 to July 2, 2014. He was chosen by mayor-elect Vincent C. Gray in December 2010.

From August 2009 to December 2010, Ellerbe was the Sarasota County fire chief.

== Early life and education ==
Ellerbe was born on April 10, 1960, and was a native of the District of Columbia. He was the eldest of four children, with three brothers – Keenan, Kelton, and Kevin.

Ellerbe was a 1978 graduate of Calvin Coolidge High School in Washington, D.C. He held a B.S. in public administration (1996) and an M.P.A. from the University of the District of Columbia (2006). He was pursuing a Ph.D. in political science from Howard University.

== Career ==
Ellerbe first joined the DC Fire Department in 1982. After 27 years, Ellerbe joined Florida's Sarasota County Fire Department. Ellerbe left the Sarasota department after less than a year and a half to work as the Fire and EMS Chief of Washington, D.C.

Ellerbe left the District of Columbia department in July 2009, to become the fire chief in Sarasota. According to Ellerbe, he decided to make the move to Florida because he did not see his career moving forward in D.C. at the time. He made an annual income of $112,500. This leave was under a controversial agreement that would have kept him on the rolls until his 50th birthday and allowed him to collect an additional $600,000 from the pension fund. The deal was terminated in December 2009, after the Washington Times reported on it.

During his time in Sarasota, Ellerbe illegally attempted to claim a homestead exemption for his home in Washington.

Ellerbe's salary before leaving for Florida was $149,992. He made $187,302 with the DC Fire Department.

== Treatment of employees ==
In early 2000, a group of firefighters claimed they were unfairly transferred by Ellerbe, who was then interim fire chief. The American Civil Liberties Union took up their case, and one of the first acts of the newly appointed permanent replacement fire chief, Ronnie Few, was to repeal those transfers.

During a June 28, 2010 meeting, two senior supervisors in the Sarasota department met with Ellerbe to discuss the concerns of female employees who said "they feel uncomfortable around the chief because he looks them up and down and 'talks to my chest'". Ellerbe's response was "It's part of my heritage to check people out, and you can tell them that", and "I haven't seen anything in this department that I'd want to undress with my eyes anyway, and you can tell them that." At least one female member of the department documented and reported Ellerbe's behavior.

As fire chief in D.C., Ellerbe changed the policy of providing light-duty positions to pregnant firefighters. Ellerbe limited the time a sick or injured firefighter could spend at a desk to 30 days, which was not enough time for pregnant firefighters to protect their unborn children from the hazards of firefighting. After pressure from the firefighters' union and City Council members Mendelsohn and Cheh, the chief increased the time in a light duty position to 90 days, roughly one-third of the time required. Media coverage of the policy upset Chief Ellerbe and led him to threaten the union president with reprisal.

In February 2012, Ellerbe ordered maintenance crews to paint over the "DCFD" on the doors of Engine Co. 7's quarters, where the local union president worked.

In October 2012, an arbitrator ruled that Ellerbe's treatment of the union local president was unlawful retaliation. D.C. Council Chairman Phil Mendelson referred to the ruling "sobering".

In April 2012, Ellerbe demoted one of his battalion chiefs for a decision he had made as a hearing officer in a disciplinary case. A month later, he transferred another battalion chief, who had been a hearing officer for the same incident, to desk duty. In July of the same year, the American Civil Liberties Union sent a letter to the DC Attorney General's office, questioning whether firefighters could expect due process in disciplinary cases.

In May 2013, Ellerbe dismissed a female recruit's complaint of sexual harassment as "not sexual in nature".

In September 2013, Ellerbe transferred a paramedic firefighter to desk duty and placed him on "non-patient contact" for writing a letter to the DC City Council warning of a "dire situation" in emergency medical services being provided to the city due to a lack of coverage created by a lack of advanced life support providers. In his letter, he cited the steady decline in the number of paramedics within the department due to attrition and Ellerbe's lack of hiring, and informed them that the remaining paramedics were suffering from "burnout" due to the increased workloads from being forced to work 36-hour shifts and an increase in call volume placed on the small number of paramedic engine companies operating on a daily basis. The letter was sparked by a run in which a five-month-old child went into cardiac arrest. The paramedic's engine company was sent on the call from over two miles away due to the lack of advanced life support units in operation. The child later died at the hospital.

At a D.C. Council's public safety committee hearing in March 2014, Kevin Byrne, a deputy fire chief, testified that after arriving in 2011, Ellerbe "went to war with his senior staff".

In 2014, a female working as a quality manager in the Office of the Assistant Fire Chief/Medical Director was terminated after reporting being sexually harassed by a former Jr. high school friend of Ellerbe's who worked as paramedic in the Office of the Medical Director. Her immediate supervisor, the Medical Director, was unaware Ellerbe "fired" his right hand and wasn't made aware of the unlawful decision until the former employee notified him that she had been removed.

== Staffing policies ==
As fire chief in Sarasota, Ellerbe cut the staffing of fire engines from three firefighters to two, half of the National Fire Protection Association's staffing recommendations of four firefighters per company, and less than the three generally required as minimum throughout the country.

On January 13, 2012, Ellerbe published an opinion piece in the Washington Post, where he espoused the idea that he could reduce firefighter fatigue by changing from a 42-hour workweek to a 56-hour workweek. The Washington Post had previously published support for the chief's plan, despite being in contrast to the existing science. The only research specifically regarding firefighter work schedules stated "With respect to sustaining cognitive performance in the face of nocturnal alarms, clearly schedule 4 [the 24-hour-on, 72-hour-off schedule that the DCFD currently works] is the best schedule". The chief's plan would have cut the number of firefighters by a whole shift, or 475 firefighters. The reduction in force was originally proposed by Ellerbe in his fiscal year 2012 budget oversight document, in which he proposed that the savings from the attrition of firefighters resulting from schedule changes could be used to expand the fire cadet program for DC residents.

In January 2012, Ellerbe prohibited firefighters from wearing jackets with the letters "DCFD" on the back. (The fire department did not issue rainwear or cold-weather clothing to the firefighters who staffed the fire trucks and ambulances, only to non-firefighter Emergency Medical Service personnel and management.) Prior to this order, members of the department had purchased their own outerwear, and had it embroidered with "DCFD" and their fire company affiliation. In response to this order, the members began to wear plain blue jackets or otherwise obscure the offending letters. Within weeks, an order was issued for another uniform change, the fifth in a year, that prohibited plain blue jackets.

In response to Ellerbe's proposed shift change, the resultant reduction in force, multiple uniform orders, and citing "zero confidence in his ability to lead the department", more than 100 firefighters turned their backs to him during the question-and-answer portion of the department's first ever State of the Department speech. In response, Lon Walls, the Fire and Emergency Medical Services Communications Director, tweeted: "Just witnessed a blatant display of racism and disrespect shown to an African American leader. I guess this is a warmup for tonight's SOUA."

In November 2012, Ellerbe made public a plan to remove all advanced life support ambulances from service overnight, a total of 14 transport units.

On the night of December 31, 2012, Ellerbe's department placed 11 transport units out of service, blaming excessive sick leave taken by the members of the department that morning. As a result, many patients had to wait for transport units, including one cardiac arrest patient who had to wait 40 minutes for an ambulance from neighboring Prince George's County, MD. That patient died. A stabbing victim had to be transported in the cab of a fire truck because of the lack of an ambulance.

On March 5, 2013, a Washington D.C. police officer was struck by a hit and run driver near A and 46th streets in SE. A paramedic engine company from DCFD arrived eight minutes after the officer was struck. That officer was transported by a Prince George's County ambulance because there were no DCFD ambulances available. More than 10 units had been placed out of service due to a new policy the fire chief had implemented. The Prince George's ambulance arrived at least 20 minutes after the officer was struck.

In late June 2013, the DC City Council's Judiciary Committee recommended against approving Ellerbe's plan to reduce the number of ambulances in service overnight.

== Fleet issues ==
In June 2011, 28% of the department's ambulances were out of service because of mechanical problems. The union claimed that there were no reserve fleet from which to draw. During a heat wave, Ellerbe placed ambulances with broken air conditioning in service. Temperature inside at least one ambulance was over 100 degrees Fahrenheit. The department later accused employees, in general, of sabotaging vehicles, without accusing any individuals.

In February 2013, at the behest of Committee Chair Tommy Wells, Ellerbe provided the council with an inventory of the fire department vehicle fleet. The firefighter's union claimed that these numbers, given under oath, were wildly inaccurate. Ellerbe had previously stated that firefighters living outside of Washington, DC were a "homeland security threat", if he needed to call them back to emergency duty. One union official pointed out "They'd have nothing to ride on. We'd have to push them down the street in wheelbarrows."

In late February 2013, a DC Police officer was struck by a hit and run driver, and no DC ambulances were available to transport him to the hospital. He was eventually transported, after some delay, by an ambulance from neighboring Prince George's County. At the time, four DC ambulances were out of service for mechanical reasons. Two days later, firefighters transported a stroke victim to the hospital in the cab of a fire engine, because there were no ambulances available nearby.

In March 2013, FEMS Chief Ellerbe announced that the deputy chief in charge of the apparatus fleet had retired.

In June 2013, an audit of the department's vehicle fleet revealed that only slightly more than half of the department's ambulances available were available for service, and that the total vehicle count previously claimed by Ellerbe was drastically overstated.

In September 2014, forty percent of the department's ladder trucks were taken out of service due to failed ladder inspections. Many accused Ellerbe of being more concerned about clothing and decals than safety inspections of equipment.

== Mayoral support ==
Despite firing a series of high-profile government officials for relatively minor issues, Mayor Vincent Gray stood by Ellerbe. In an interview with WAMU, when asked what his relationship with Gray was, Ellerbe replied "I'm a subordinate agency director under the Mayor." Tom Sherwood then produced footage from NBC4, shot in January 2011, where Ellerbe talked about knowing the mayor since he was 14 years old, and that they were "good friends".

Since the agency's participation in the citywide Grade DC program under Ellerbe's supervision, the agency achieved a "B" score or higher, for the last four months achieving in the "A" range. The Grade DC program came under fire from Washington Post columnist Mike Debonis on April 3, 2013, who wrote "it's hard to make the case that the public should take the grades (including the city's overall grade of A−) with anything besides a sizable grain of salt." In the same article, influential local activist Dorothy Brizil was quoted referring to Ellerbe's agency: "I frankly find it quite questionable that FEMS would have a grade of A+ in the month of March."

On July 2, 2013, Councilperson Mary Cheh submitted a letter to Councilperson Tommy Wells, chair of the committee overseeing the Fire Department, stating her belief that "the current Chief [Ellerbe] no longer has the confidence of the people of the District and should resign." In response, Paul Quander, Deputy Mayor for Public Safety and Justice, released a statement claiming that the department had improved over Ellerbe's tenure, that the controversies were rooted in previous administration's actions, and that "We should stay the course" with Ellerbe.

== Personal life and death ==
Ellerbe resided in Southeast D.C. He was divorced and had one daughter. He also had one daughter from a previous relationship, as well as one granddaughter. He was found dead at his home in Southeast D.C. on February 27, 2022.
