= Murder of Mohammad Anwar =

2021 murder in the United States

- Location: Near Nationals Park, Washington, D.C.
- Date: March 23, 2021; 5 years ago
- Attack type: Murder, carjacking
- Weapon: Stun gun
- Victims: Mohammad Anwar, aged 66
- Assailant: Two unnamed teenage girls
- Verdict: Pleaded guilty
- Convictions: Felony murder
- Sentence: Juvenile detention until the age of 21, or until deemed rehabilitated

The murder of Mohammad Anwar occurred on March 23, 2021, as a result of a daylight carjacking by two teenage girls next to Nationals Park in Washington, D.C.

== Victim ==
Anwar, 66, who immigrated to Springfield, Virginia in 2014, was a father and grandfather, survived by a wife and two adult children in the United States, while his four grandchildren live in Pakistan. He was working as an Uber Eats driver in the Navy Yard area of D.C. when two teen girls assaulted him with a stun gun and crashed his Honda Accord while attempting to hijack it.

Anwar was ejected from the car during the carjacking, landing on the sidewalk in front of Nationals Park, severely injured and unresponsive. He later died at a hospital. The two hijackers were helped from the car by National Guardsmen stationed near the stadium as part of Operation Capitol Response.

== Perpetrators ==
The perpetrators were both teenagers, one age 13 from southeast Washington, D.C., and another 15 from Fort Washington, Maryland. Police said it was not the first recent crime for one of the two. Both were arrested at the scene and charged with felony murder and carjacking the same day, pleading "not involved" (the juvenile equivalent of not guilty). Some observers called for the girls to be tried as adults, but District of Columbia law prohibits 13-year olds from being tried as adults, and the prosecutor in the case did not wish to try the 15-year old suspect as an adult.

Prosecutors offered the two suspects plea bargains, allowing them to plead guilty to felony murder in exchange for dismissing other charges. Prosecutors announced that the 15-year old accepted this deal on May 11, 2021, and that the 13-year old accepted on June 3, 2021. The 15-year old received the maximum sentence allowed by law and was remanded to the care of a youth agency until deemed rehabilitated or reaching the age of 21; the younger girl (age 14 at time of sentencing) received the same sentence on July 6, 2021.

== Response ==
Mayor Muriel Bowser was criticized after sharing a video on preventing auto thefts in response to the killing, as the crime was carjacking, which had tripled in the Navy Yard area over the previous year.
