= Robert R. Barry =

American politician

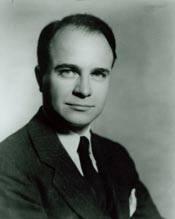

Member of the U.S. House of Representatives from New York
- In office January 3, 1959 – January 3, 1965
- Preceded by: Ralph W. Gwinn
- Succeeded by: Richard Ottinger
- Constituency: 27th district (1959–1963); 25th district (1963–1965)

Personal details
- Born: Robert Raymond Barry; May 15, 1915 Omaha, Nebraska, U.S.
- Died: June 14, 1988 (aged 73) Redwood City, California, U.S.
- Party: Republican
- Spouse: Anne Rogers Benjamin Barry
- Children: 2
- Education: Hamilton College

Robert Raymond Barry (May 15, 1915 – June 14, 1988) was an American businessman and politician and a Republican member of the United States House of Representatives from New York, serving three terms from 1959 to 1965.

== Biography ==
Barry was born in Omaha, Nebraska, and received early education in the public schools of Evanston, Illinois. He attended Hamilton College from 1933 to 1936, the Tuck School of Business at Dartmouth College in 1937, and New York University in 1938. He became a member of the International Seamen's Union and later helped organize the International Chamber of Commerce.

== Career ==
At the start of his career, Barry became active in investment banking with Kidder, Peabody & Co. He later worked in commercial banking with Manufacturers Trust Company, and was an executive of Bendix Aviation from 1940 to 1943, and Yale & Towne Manufacturing from 1945 to 1950. He was also involved in farming, mining, and real estate development.

== World War II ==
During World War II, Barry worked in the office of the Undersecretary of the Navy.

=== Early career ===
He served on the political staffs of Wendell Willkie, Governor Thomas Dewey and Presidents Dwight D. Eisenhower and Richard Nixon. He was the United States delegate to several NATO Parliamentary Assemblies and to UNESCO. He was chairman of the United Nations Committee to Build the Perry World House.

Barry's business ventures included mining operations in Portola, California, and real estate development near California's Salton Sea.

=== Congress ===
In 1958, Barry was elected to the Eighty-sixth Congress as a Republican as the representative of New York's 27th district, which included his hometown of Yonkers. He was reelected in 1960 and 1962, and served in the United States House of Representatives from January 3, 1959, to January 3, 1965; in his final term, redistricting moved him to the 27th District. Barry was an unsuccessful candidate for reelection to the Eighty-ninth Congress in 1964.

=== After Congress ===
Barry had spent a great deal of time in California even while representing New York in Congress. After losing his 1964 campaign, he made California his permanent residence. In 1966, he was the unsuccessful Republican nominee for California's 38th Congressional District. He was an unsuccessful candidate in the 1967 special election for California's 11th district, and again in the 1968 general election. In 1970, Barry ran unsuccessfully for the Republican nomination for the U.S. Senate from California. In 1972, he was defeated for the Republican nomination in California's 17th district. In 1982, President Ronald Reagan appointed Barry to the advisory council of the Peace Corps.

== Affiliations ==
Barry was a member of the Farm Bureau, the Friendly Sons of St. Patrick, and Alpha Delta Phi fraternity.

== Death ==
Barry died in Redwood City, California on June 14, 1988 (age 73 years, 30 days). The location of his interment is unknown.

== Family ==
He married Anne Rogers Benjamin on July 19, 1945. They were the parents of one son, Henry and one daughter, Cynthia.

U.S. House of Representatives
Preceded by Ralph W. Gwinn	Member of the U.S. House of Representatives from New York's 27th congressional district 1959–1963	Succeeded by Katharine St. George
Preceded by Paul A. Fino	Member of the U.S. House of Representatives from New York's 25th congressional district 1963–1965	Succeeded by Richard Ottinger
