= Ralph W. Gwinn =

American politician

Ralph Waldo Gwinn
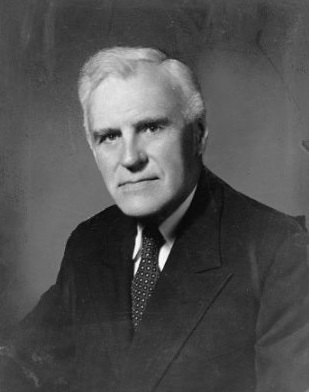

Member of the U.S. House of Representatives from New York's 27th district
- In office January 3, 1945 – January 3, 1959
- Preceded by: Jay LeFevre
- Succeeded by: Robert R. Barry

Personal details
- Born: March 29, 1884 Noblesville, Indiana, U.S.
- Died: February 27, 1962 (aged 77) Delray Beach, Florida, U.S.
- Party: Republican
- Education: DePauw University; Columbia University Law School

Ralph Waldo Gwinn (March 29, 1884 – February 27, 1962) was a Republican member of the United States House of Representatives from New York.

Gwinn was born in Noblesville, Indiana. He graduated from DePauw University in 1905 and Columbia University Law School in 1908. He served as a special representative of the Secretary of War in the European theatre of World War I. He was president of the Bronxville, New York board of education from 1920 until 1930. He was elected to Congress in 1944 and served from January 3, 1945, until January 3, 1959. Gwinn voted in favor of the Civil Rights Act of 1957. He died in Delray Beach, Florida. He is buried at Pawling Cemetery in Pawling, New York.

== Sources ==
- United States Congress. "Ralph W. Gwinn (id: G000541)". Biographical Directory of the United States Congress.

U.S. House of Representatives
| Preceded by Jay LeFevre | Member of the U.S. House of Representatives from New York's 27th congressional district 1945–1959 | Succeeded by Robert R. Barry |
