= Chatham University =

Private university in Pittsburgh, Pennsylvania, US

Coordinates: 40.44917°N 79.92583°W

- Former names: Pennsylvania Female College (1869–1890); Pennsylvania College for Women (1890–1955); Chatham College (1955–2007)
- Motto: Filiae Nostrae Sicut Antarii Lapides (Latin)
- Motto in English: That our daughters may be as cornerstones, polished after the similitude of a palace.
- Type: Private university
- Established: December 11, 1869; 156 years ago
- Endowment: $106.6 million (2021)
- President: Lisa Lambert
- Students: 2,314 (fall 2024)
- Undergraduates: 1,555 (fall 2024)
- Postgraduates: 759 (fall 2024)
- Location: Pittsburgh, Pennsylvania, United States
- Campus: 39 acres (16 ha)
- Colors: Purple and gray
- Nickname: Cougars
- Sporting affiliations: NCAA Division III – PAC
- Mascot: Carson the Cougar
- Website: chatham.edu
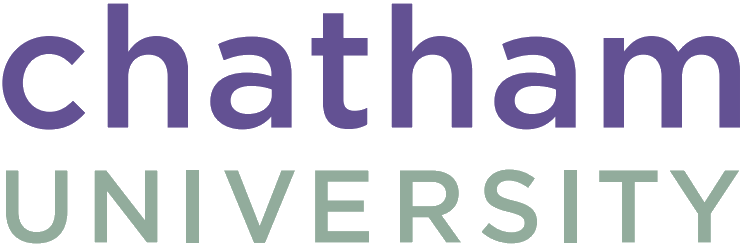

Chatham University is a private university in Pittsburgh, Pennsylvania, United States. Originally founded as a women's college, it began enrolling men in undergraduate programs in 2015. In 2024-2025, Chatham University enrolled approximately 2,300 students, including 1,551 total (full-time and part-time) undergraduate students and 769 total (full-time and part-time) graduate students, with a larger student body expected for 2026-2027.

Chatham University grants certificates and degrees including bachelor, master, professional, and doctorate degrees in the School of Health Sciences, the Falk School of Sustainability & Environment, and the School of Arts, Science & Business.

== History ==
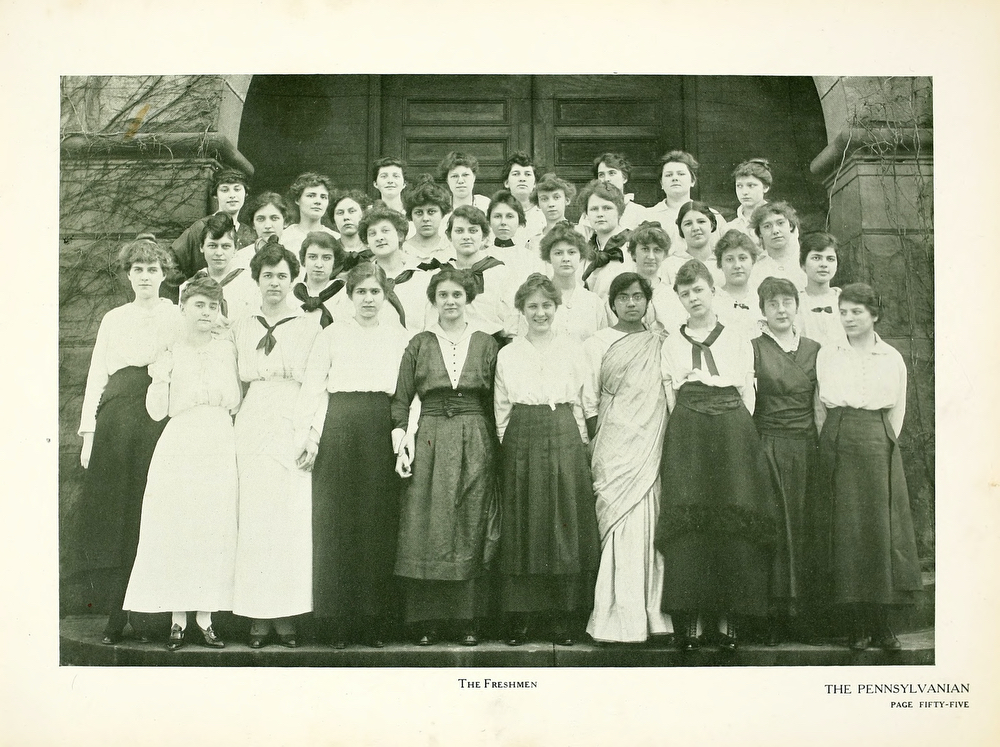
Freshman class, 1914–15

Founded as the "Pennsylvania Female College" on December 11, 1869, by Reverend William Trimble Beatty (the father of opera singer Louise Homer), the future Chatham University was originally located in the Berry mansion on Woodland Road off Fifth Avenue in the neighborhood of Shadyside. Shadyside Campus today is composed of buildings and grounds from a number of former private mansions. The college was renamed "Pennsylvania College for Women" in 1890, and "Chatham College" in 1955. The latter name was to honor William Pitt, 1st Earl of Chatham, after whom the city of Pittsburgh is named.

The school reaffirmed University accreditation status on April 23, 2007 from the Middle States Commission on Higher Education (MSCHE), and the Pennsylvania Department of Education changed its status from College to University. Chatham University then publicly announced its new status on May 1, 2007, changing its name to Chatham University.

With elements designed for the original Andrew Mellon estate by the Olmsted Brothers, the 39 acre (16 hectare) Shadyside Campus was designated an arboretum in 1998 by the American Association of Botanical Gardens and Arboreta.

In 2005, the University expanded its programs to include online advanced degree programs (bachelors, masters, doctoral) through the School of Continuing Education, later the School for Continuing and Professional Studies. Two years later, Chatham's MFA in Creative Writing program was named one of the top five Innovative/Unique Programs by The Atlantic Monthly.

Chatham University received some national attention in 2014 when it announced that it was engaging in a period of study "considering admitting men for the first time," resulting in "reactions of surprise and anger" from its alumnae. Undergraduate men began attending in 2015.

After the departure of Rhonda Phillips as president on June 1, 2025, it was announced that Chatham's provost and vice president of academic affairs, Lisa Lambert, would be appointed as Chatham University's interim president. In October, 2025, Lambert was appointed as Chatham's 21st president.

Chatham University maintains a connection to its origins as an all-women's college with the "Women's Institute", which celebrated 10 years in 2025.

== Campuses ==
Chatham University's original Shadyside Campus is part of historic Woodland Road. The Shadyside Campus also includes the Chatham Eastside building, which serves as the home for the health science and interior architecture programs.

Chatham University's new 388-acre (157 hectare) Eden Hall Campus is located north of the city of Pittsburgh in Richland Township, Pennsylvania; it is the home of Chatham's Falk School of Sustainability & Environment. Programs at Eden Hall Campus include a Bachelors in Sustainability, a Masters of Sustainability, a Masters of Arts in Food Studies, and dual degrees in Masters of Sustainability or Masters of Arts in Food Studies with Masters in Business Administration.

The Eden Hall Campus was donated to Chatham University by the Eden Hall Foundation on May 1, 2008.

In 2011, the university engaged the architectural team of Berkebile Nelson Immenschuh McDowell (BNIM) of Kansas City, Mo. and the landscape design firm Andropogon Associates of Philadelphia to lead the master planning process. The first phase of development was designed by the firm Mithun, was completed in 2016, and won an award for sustainable development.

In 2013, the Falk Foundation made its largest and final grant to the School of Sustainability & the Environment for the completion of the Eden Hall Campus. The grant was also the largest grant in the history of Chatham University. The School of Sustainability & the Environment was renamed the Falk School of Sustainability. The Falk Foundation made its first grant to Chatham in 1952 with the funding of Chatham's Falk Hall, named in honor of Laura Falk, wife of foundation founder Maurice Falk.

== Accreditation ==
Chatham University is accredited by the Middle States Commission on Higher Education. In 2017, Chatham was forced to close its campus in Puerto Rico. In 2019, it was forced to close two of its medical education programs, in Miami, Florida and in San Juan. Chatham University continues to be accredited, although with a number of non-compliance warnings and program closings in the past decade and a half. On June 25, 2026, Chatham University was warned by the MSCHE that its accreditation may be in danger of being lost.

== Athletics ==
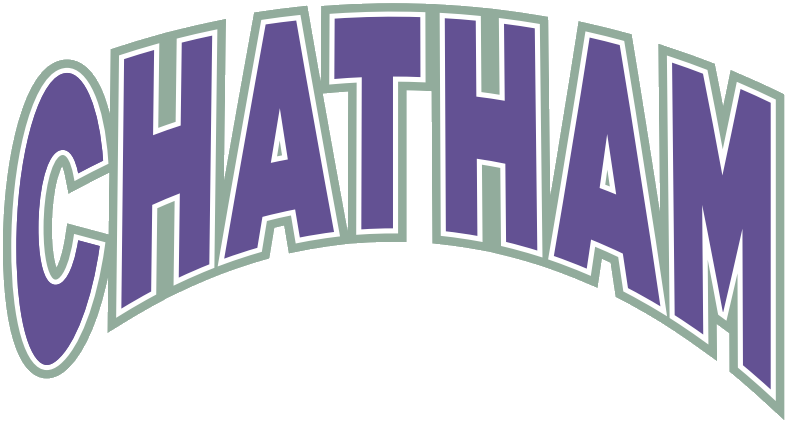
Chatham athletics wordmark

Chatham University teams, also known as the Cougars, participate as a member of the NCAA Division III. The Cougars are a member of the Presidents' Athletic Conference (PAC). Chatham has both men's and women's varsity teams in basketball, cross country, ice hockey, lacrosse, soccer, softball, squash, swimming & diving, track & field, volleyball, and co-ed sideline cheerleading. Men's and women's ice hockey play in the United Collegiate Hockey Conference.

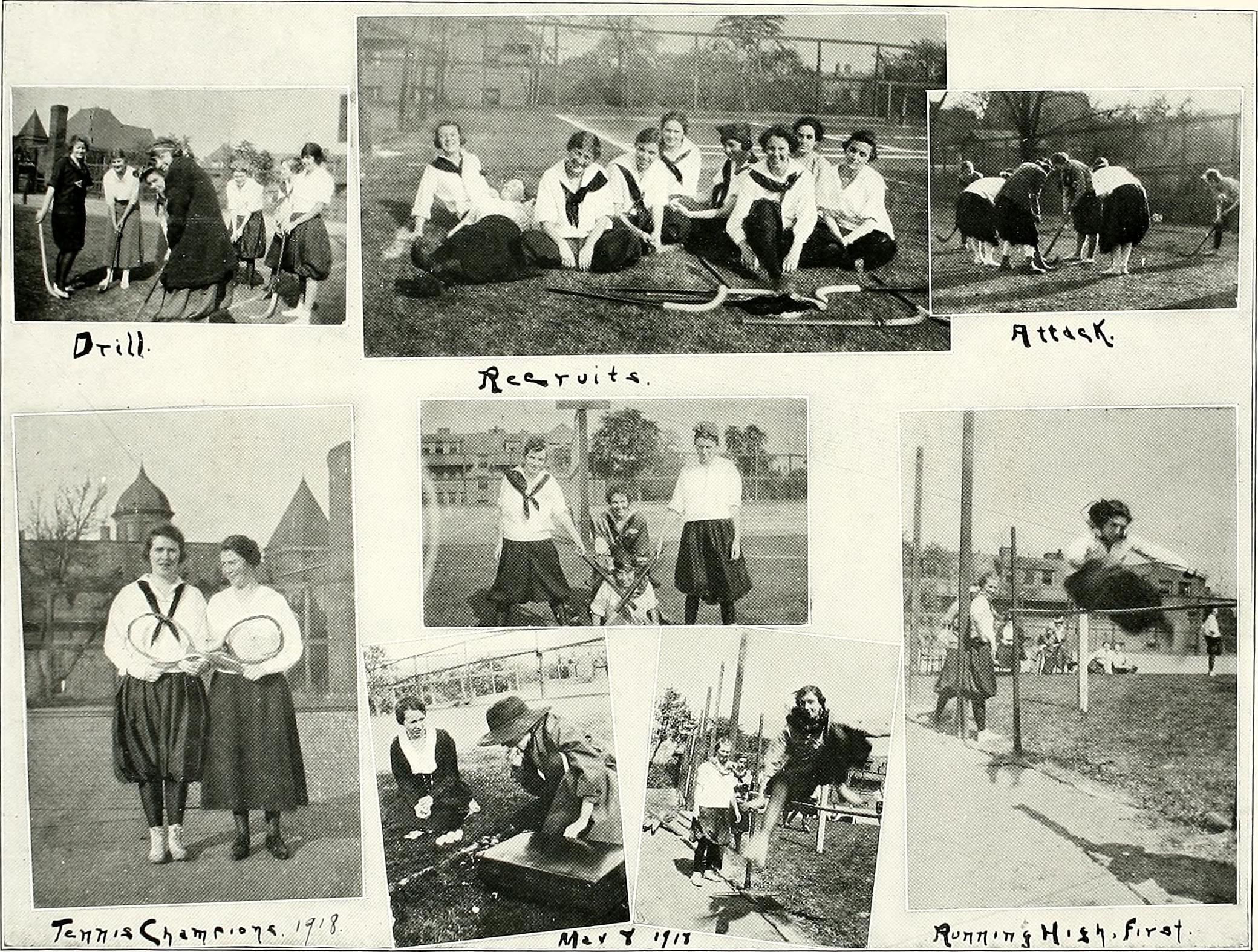
Chatham's athletics team of 1919

The women's ice hockey team was the first NCAA women's ice hockey team in Pennsylvania.

Chatham athletics announced in November 2024 that they would add a co-ed competitive cheerleading team for the 2025-2026 season.

The college mascot was previously Pennsy the Seal. The cougar mascot was adopted in 1992 and was named Carson in honor of alumna Rachel Carson in 2011. In 2023, 55.6% of students participating in a non-binding referendum held by the student government voted to reinstate Pennsy the Seal as the college mascot. The vote did not affect the college mascot. In a later April 2025 referendum, 60% of students who participated voted in favor of reinstating Pennsy the Seal.

== Notable alumni ==
- Paige Beauchemin, member of the New Hampshire House of Representatives
- Muriel Bowser, mayor of Washington, D.C.
- Brian Broome, writer
- Rachel Carson, biologist and zoologist
- Catherine Chisholm Cushing, playwright
- Kipp Dawson, activist and coal miner
- Meredith Dixon, member of the New Mexico House of Representatives
- Kathie L. Olsen, former deputy director of the National Science Foundation
- Elaine Scarry, author and Walter M. Cabot Professor of Aesthetics and the General Theory of Value at Harvard University
- Lea Wait, author of mystery novels and children's books
- Lesley Brooks Wells, United States district judge
- Mildred Weston, author and composer
- Margaret Scully Zimmele, artist

== See also ==
- Chatham University Arboretum
