= Richard Ottinger =

American politician (1929–2026)

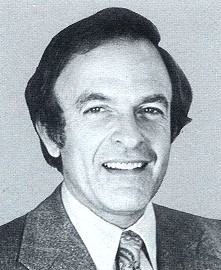
- Ottinger in 1979

Dean of the Pace University School of Law
- In office 1994–1999
- Preceded by: Barbara Black (acting)
- Succeeded by: David Cohen

Member of the U.S. House of Representatives from New York
- In office January 3, 1975 – January 3, 1985
- Preceded by: Ogden Reid
- Succeeded by: Joseph DioGuardi
- Constituency: 24th district (1975–1983); 20th district (1983–1985)
- In office January 3, 1965 – January 3, 1971
- Preceded by: Robert Barry
- Succeeded by: Peter Peyser
- Constituency: 25th district

Personal details
- Born: Richard Lawrence Ottinger; January 27, 1929 New York City, New York, U.S.
- Died: February 16, 2026 (aged 97) Mamaroneck, New York, U.S.
- Party: Democratic
- Spouses: Betty Schneider (divorced); Sharon Frink (divorced); June Godfrey (m. 1987)
- Children: 4
- Relatives: Albert Ottinger (uncle)
- Education: Cornell University (BA); Harvard University (LLB); Georgetown University (attended)

Military service
- Allegiance: United States
- Branch: United States Air Force
- Service years: 1955–1957
- Rank: Captain

Richard Lawrence Ottinger (January 27, 1929 – February 16, 2026) was an American attorney, politician and law professor from the state of New York. A member of the Democratic Party, Ottinger served in the United States House of Representatives from 1965 to 1971 and again from 1975 to 1985. Ottinger was the Democratic candidate for U.S. Senate in 1970, but was defeated by Conservative James L. Buckley.

== Early years ==
Ottinger was born in New York City on January 27, 1929. He was the son of Louise (née Loewenstein), a philanthropist who supported the arts and social causes, and Lawrence Ottinger, a businessman and founder of U.S. Plywood. He was the nephew of Albert Ottinger, a Republican who served as Attorney General of New York from 1925 to 1928. He attended the public schools of Scarsdale, New York, and graduated from the Loomis School in Windsor, Connecticut, in 1946. He received a bachelor of arts degree from Cornell University in 1950 and graduated from Harvard Law School in 1953. He also studied international law at Georgetown University. He served in the United States Air Force from 1955 to 1957 and was discharged as a captain.

Ottinger was admitted to the New York bar and practiced international and corporate law. He was the second staff member of the Peace Corps, serving as director of programs for the west coast of South America from 1961 to 1964.

== Political career ==
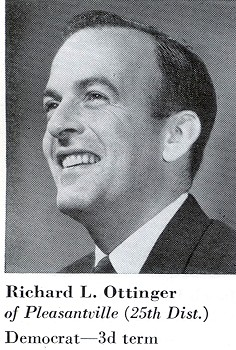
Congressional Pictorial Directory, 1969

=== U.S. House of Representatives (1965–1971) ===
In the 1964 elections, Ottinger was elected as a Democrat to the 89th United States Congress and was re-elected twice in 1966 and 1968. He represented New York's 25th congressional district, which included all of Putnam County and part of Westchester County. After the 1964 election, the result was challenged by Ottinger's opponent, incumbent U.S. Rep. Robert Barry. Barry alleged that Ottinger used a loophole in election laws to spend $193,000 of his own money to get around a contribution limit of $8,000 in the race. According to Barry, Ottinger set up multiple committees and gave money to all of them. Most prominently, Ottinger's mother, Louise, and sister, Patricia Heath, had set up 22 different committees that in turn donated $6,000 apiece to his campaign.

=== U.S. Senate campaign (1970) ===
In the 1970 elections, Ottinger gave up his House seat to run on the Democratic ticket for United States Senator from New York. In the 1970 election, Ottinger split the liberal vote with the Republican (and Liberal-endorsed) nominee, incumbent Senator Charles Goodell (who was appointed by Governor Nelson Rockefeller after the assassination of Senator Robert F. Kennedy). Both were defeated by the nominee of the Conservative party, James L. Buckley, in a three-way race.

=== Return to U.S. House of Representatives (1975–1985) ===
In 1974, Ottinger was elected to the House from New York's 24th congressional district. (He previously sought to return to Congress in 1972, but was defeated.) He was re-elected to the four successive Congresses (in 1976, 1978, 1980, and 1982). Ottinger represented New York's 24th congressional district from 1975 to 1983 and represented New York's 20th congressional district from 1983 to 1985. Richard was an ardent supporter of the new legislative technique known as the Hammer, which was incorporated into the RCRA legislation known as the Hazardous and Solid Waste Amendments of 1984. of the Hammer, he wrote," perhaps the most important innovation of the 1984 RCRA Amendments is the imposition of self, executing regulation. in the event that EPA fails to meet any of the numerous statutory deadlines imposed by the amendments, so called Hammer provision automatically become effective". The innovation of these Hammer devices is the most unique and intriguing part of the 1984 amendments.[Strengthening of the Resource Conservation and Recovery Act in 1984 Ottinger, R., PACE Environmental Law Review vol3, issue 1, September 1985, p.22-23] for a complete history of the origins of the Hammer see The Birth of the Hammer in the Environmental Forum, Environmental Law Institute, Washington, Vol7, #5, Sep-Oct 1990 , P. 18 cover story by Richard Fortuna. Ottinger did not seek re-election in 1984. He bolstered his reputation as a leading legislator by founding the bipartisan Environmental Study Conference (ESC) in the House of Representatives in 1975, which grew to a membership of over 150 members in less than a year.

== Academic career ==
After retiring from Congress, Ottinger became a professor at the Elisabeth Haub School of Law at Pace University. He founded an environmental law program there and served as the law school dean from 1995 to 1999. He was named dean emeritus of the law school following his retirement.

== Personal life and death ==
Ottinger was Jewish. Ottinger was hospitalized on January 30, 2026, undergoing surgery for an intracerebral hemorrhage. He spent his final days in palliative care at his home in Mamaroneck, New York, until his death on February 16, 2026, at the age of 97. He was survived by his wife, June (née Godfrey), whom he had married in 1987, as well as four children and 10 grandchildren.

== See also ==
- List of Jewish members of the United States Congress

== Sources ==
U.S. House of Representatives
Preceded by Robert Barry	Member of the U.S. House of Representatives from New York's 25th congressional district 1965–1971	Succeeded by Peter Peyser
Preceded by Ogden Reid	Member of the U.S. House of Representatives from New York's 24th congressional district 1975–1983	Succeeded by Gerald Solomon
Preceded by Ted Weiss	Member of the U.S. House of Representatives from New York's 20th congressional district 1983–1985	Succeeded by Joe DioGuardi
Party political offices
Preceded by Robert F. Kennedy	Democratic nominee for U.S. Senator from New York (Class 1); 1970	Succeeded by Daniel Patrick Moynihan
