= Kipp Dawson =

American social justice activist (born 1945)

Kipp Dawson (born 1945) is an American social justice activist who has worked on the Civil Rights Movement, the Vietnam anti-war movement, the women's movement, the gay liberation movement, the labor movement, and the education justice movement. Over the span of her career. she has worked as a coal minor, teacher, and ran for Senate in 1970.

== Early life ==
Kipp Dawson was born in Hollywood, CA and grew up in Codornices Village in Albany, CA. She attended Berkeley High School. where she founded the Civil Rights club in solidarity with SNCC. She was arrested six times while protesting racial discrimination in the Bay Area.

While studying at San Francisco State University, Dawson was a co-organizer the Free Speech Movement and was arrested and served 29 days in jail in 1966 for participating in large-scale sit-ins bringing an end to all-white employment practices in San Francisco. She started the Vietnam Day Committee at San Francisco State and co-organized many anti-war activities in the 1960s. She opened for the 1967 Anti-Vietnam War rally of 65,000 people with Coretta Scott King, Judy Collins, and others.

== New York ==
Dawson moved to New York in 1967. While in NYC (1967–1977), Dawson participated in the women's movement and organized marches for abortion rights. She also continued as an anti-Vietnam war activist. Dawson ran for Senate from New York on the Socialist Workers Party ticket in 1970. Dawson came out as a lesbian in 1970 and separated from her husband, fellow activist Leslie Evans.

== Coal mining ==
Dawson became a coal miner and moved to Pennsylvania in 1979, a position she held for 13 years. She was part of the first Coal Employment Project Women Miners Support Team which inspired her to become an activist and organizer for United Mine Workers of America Local 1197. A leader in Local 1197, Dawson prioritized workers' safety in union mines. In 1984 Dawson traveled to England to support the British miners' strikes.

Dawson's union involvement during the mining strikes of the 1980s led to global solidarity between miners in Wales and El Salvador.

== Educator ==
Dawson received a degree in teaching in 1994 from Chatham University and went on to earn a Masters of Library and Information Science from the University of Pittsburgh in 2003. Dawson taught in Pittsburgh Public Schools for 23 years. She applied her socialist activism to her new career as a union activist and student advocate in Pennsylvania public schools.

== Bibliography ==
- Gay Liberation: A Socialist perspective (1975)
- Women miners and the UMWA: 1973-1983 (1992)
- Kate Millett’s Sexual Politics: a Marxist Appreciation (1971)
