= Muriel Bowser =

Mayor of the District of Columbia since 2015

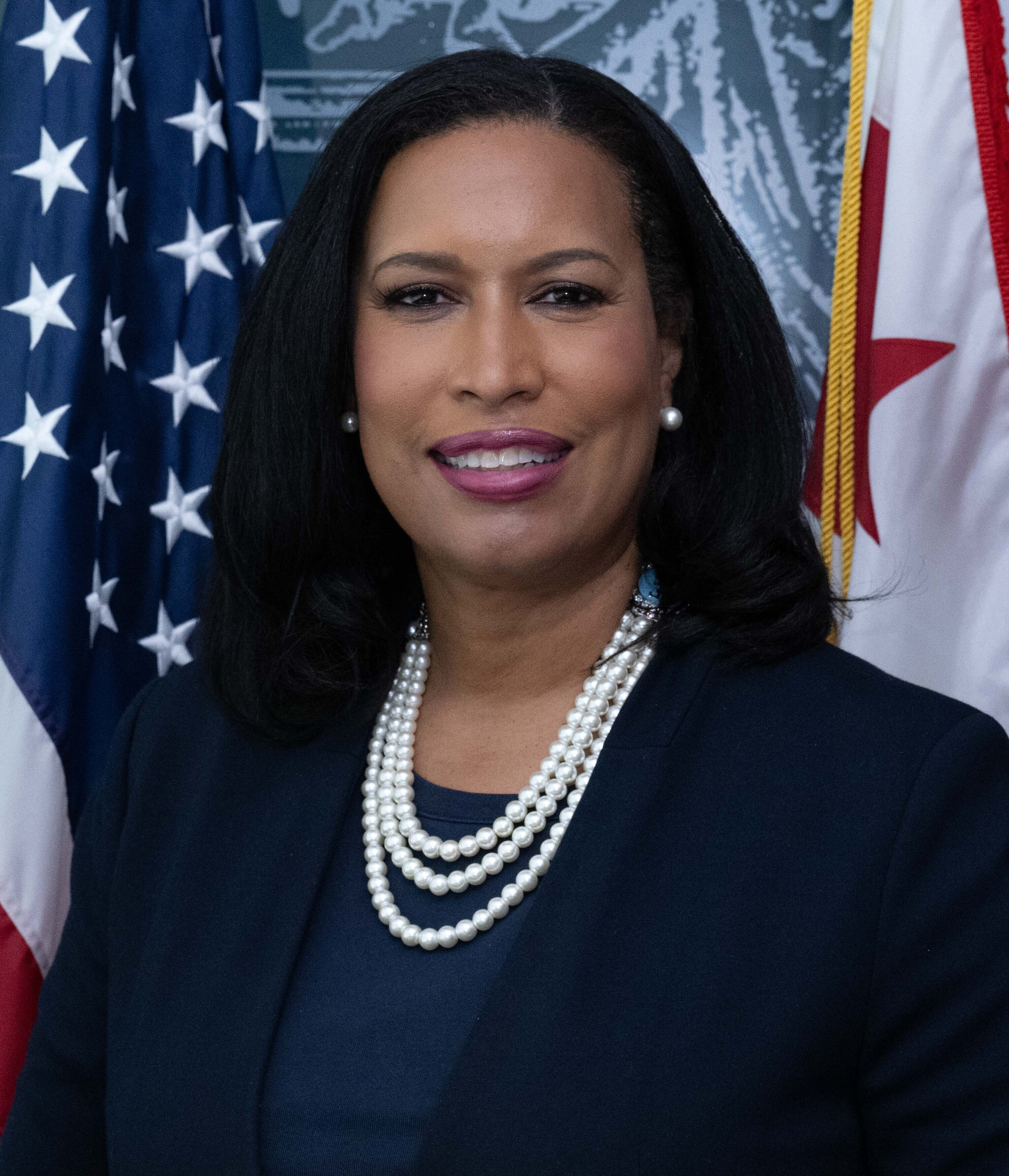
- Official portrait, 2024

8th Mayor of the District of Columbia
- Incumbent
- Assumed office January 2, 2015
- Preceded by: Vincent C. Gray

Member of the Council of the District of Columbia from Ward 4
- In office January 2, 2007 – January 2, 2015
- Preceded by: Adrian Fenty
- Succeeded by: Brandon Todd

Personal details
- Born: Muriel Elizabeth Bowser; August 2, 1972 (age 54) Washington, D.C., U.S.
- Party: Democratic
- Children: 1 (adopted)
- Education: Chatham University (BA); American University (MPP)
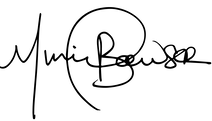
- Signature
- Website: Campaign website

Muriel Elizabeth Bowser (born August 2, 1972) is an American politician who has served as the mayor of the District of Columbia since 2015. A member of the Democratic Party, she previously represented the 4th ward as a member of the Council of the District of Columbia from 2007 to 2015. She is the second female mayor of the District of Columbia after Sharon Pratt. Since taking office in 2015, she has secured three consecutive mayoral victories—the first African‑American woman to do so.

Elected to the Advisory Neighborhood Commission in 2004, Bowser was elected to the council in a special election in 2007 and re-elected in 2008 and 2012. She was elected mayor in 2014 after defeating incumbent Vincent C. Gray in the Democratic primary. Bowser was re-elected in 2018 and in 2022. Bowser declined to run for re-election in 2026.

== Early life and education ==
Muriel Bowser was the youngest of six children of Joe and Joan Bowser. Her father was a D.C.-based public advocate who worked as a public servant and employee in D.C.-area schools. Bowser was born in Washington, D.C., and grew up in North Michigan Park in northeast D.C. In 1990, she graduated from Elizabeth Seton High School, a private all-girls Catholic high school located in Bladensburg, Maryland. She received a college scholarship because of her above average grades. Bowser graduated from Chatham College in Pittsburgh, Pennsylvania, with a bachelor's degree in history, and she graduated from the American University School of Public Affairs with a Masters in Public Policy degree. According to Bowser, she never envisioned herself as an elected politician, but possibly an appointed agency administrator.

== Political career (2004–2014) ==
=== Advisory Neighborhood Commission ===
Bowser began her political career in 2004, running unopposed for the Advisory Neighborhood Commission (ANC). She represented district 4B09, which includes the neighborhood of Riggs Park. She was unopposed again in 2006 when she ran for re-election.

=== Council of the District of Columbia ===
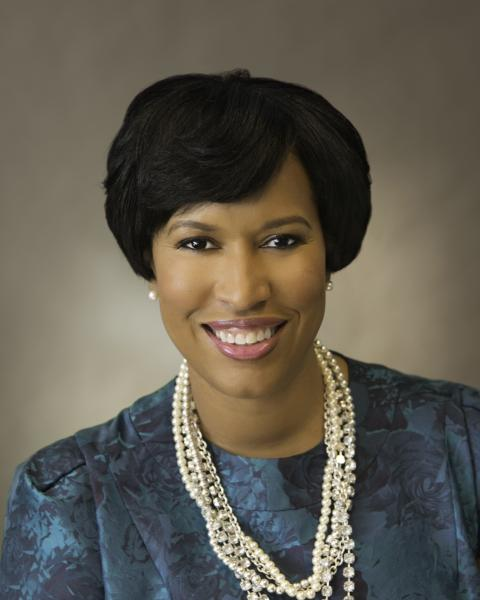
Bowser's official Council photo, 2015

==== 2007 election ====
Adrian Fenty, member of the Council of the District of Columbia representing Ward 4, ran for mayor of the District of Columbia. Bowser was his campaign coordinator for Ward 4. When Fenty was elected mayor in 2006, a special election was called to fill his council seat. Bowser, among many others, announced her candidacy.

While an ANC commissioner, Bowser had voted in favor of a zoning variance for a condominium development to be built by a developer who had contributed several hundred dollars to her campaign, which some critics derided as a conflict of interest. Bowser maintained that she had supported the development project before running for council.

The editorial page of The Washington Post favored Bowser in the election. The local councils of the AFL–CIO, Service Employees International Union, and the Fraternal Order of Police also endorsed Bowser in the election, but the American Federation of State, County and Municipal Employees endorsed her opponent, Michael A. Brown.

Bowser won the special election with 40% of the vote.

==== 2008 election ====
In 2008, Bowser announced her reelection campaign for the council. Three people ran against her in the Democratic primary: Baruti Akil Jahi, former president of the Shepherd Park Citizens Association; Malik Mendenhall-Johnson, then serving as Advisory Neighborhood Commissioner of 4B04; and Paul E. Montague, who had been Advisory Neighborhood Commissioner of 4B07 before being recalled in 2004.

No candidates' names were on the ballot for the Republican or D.C. Statehood Green primaries. The Washington Post's editorial department endorsed Bowser's candidacy. The Gertrude Stein Democratic Club also voted to endorse her reelection.

Bowser won the Democratic Party primary election, receiving 75% of the votes. Jahi received 19%, Montague received 3%, and Mendenhall-Johnson received 2%. With no one else appearing on the subsequent general election ballot, Bowser won the general election with 97% of the vote.

In 2011, Bowser was appointed to the Washington Metropolitan Area Transportation Authority board of governors, a position she held until 2015.

==== 2012 election ====
Bowser ran for reelection in 2012. She said she would accept donations from corporations. Candidate Max Skolnik criticized Bowser for receiving campaign contributions from developers, corporate bundlers, and lobbyists, saying that she would favor the interests of these corporate donors. She said she was not in favor of banning corporations from making political donations altogether, saying that doing so would make it more difficult to track where campaign donations come from. She also said that corporations are banned from donating to federal elections, but that corporations still find ways to give to campaigns.

Bowser's candidacy was endorsed by the editorial board of The Washington Post recognizing her qualifications and vision for the district. She was also endorsed by the Washington City Paper. Bowser won the Democratic primary with 66% of the vote, to Renee L. Bowser's (no relation) 13%, Max Skolnik's 9%, Baruti Jahi's 5%, Judi Jones' 3%, and Calvin Gurley's 2%. Unopposed in the general election, she was elected with 97% of the vote.

==== 2014 election ====
On March 23, 2013, Bowser announced that she would run for Mayor of the District of Columbia in the 2014 election. Her campaign's chair was former council member William Lightfoot.

Bowser emphasized that she could connect with longtime residents concerned about the rapid changes occurring in the district, while still celebrating the changes. She disdained business-as-usual and corruption in the District's government. She favored free Metro fares for students. She was against increasing the minimum wage only for employees of large retailers. Bowser was criticized for being too inexperienced for the position, with too few legislative accomplishments while on the council, and for having a platform that was short on details. She limited the number of debates by only agreeing to participate after the field of candidates had been set, which postponed the first debate until August.

Bowser was endorsed by EMILY's List and the editorial board of The Washington Post. She won the Democratic mayoral primary election with 43% of the vote. To raise funds for her campaign she accepted contributions in excess of legal limits, for which she was fined after winning the election. Lightfoot, Bowser's campaign chairman, called the excess campaign contributions mistakes and said the mayor was accepting responsibility and would not appeal the fines.

In the general election, Bowser was on the ballot with Independents David Catania, Nestor Djonkam and Carol Schwartz, D.C. Statehood Green Faith Dane and Libertarian Bruce Majors. No Republican filed. Bowser won the election with 80,824 votes (54.53%) to Catania's 35% and Schwartz's 7%, and took office on January 2, 2015.

== Mayor of the District of Columbia (2015-present) ==
=== Animal control ===
In 2017, Bowser proposed several animal regulations, including a ban on backyard chickens, a requirement that all cats be licensed, and a provision that seemed to outlaw leaving dog feces in private yards for more than 24 hours. Following public backlash, the city administrator clarified that "this is not a war on pets" and the proposals were withdrawn. Later the same year, the Department of Health began to enforce an existing law banning dogs from outdoor bar patios. Following public objections, the D.C. Council changed the law to allow business owners to decide whether or not to allow dogs.

=== Arts and culture ===
Though expressing support for the arts community, Bowser's actions regarding the D.C. Commission on the Arts and Humanities were met with controversy.

In February 2015, Bowser cancelled the creation of a public facility for art exhibitions, lectures and educational activities by the Institute for Contemporary Expression. Approved by Gray, the project involved a privately funded conversion of the historic but unused Franklin School and had its first event planned for September 2015. Bowser cited financial concerns for the decision, but critics noted that several of the firms who earlier competed unsuccessfully for the property were among her donors. As of October 2015, proposals were still being considered.

Asserting legal authority that was questioned by the D.C. Council, in 2019 her administration took control of the art collection owned by the D.C. Commission on the Arts and Humanities and sought to bring the organization under her control. Her power struggle saw staff of the Commission locked out of their jobs without warning. Bowser used her third ever veto to block legislation that would have preserved the independence of the organization, which also provides grants to hundreds of artists.

=== Autonomous vehicles ===
In February 2018, Bowser announced the formation of a work group, with members drawn from various agencies, to explore the benefits of and prepare the district for autonomous vehicle technology. The city and the Southwest Business Improvement District were also exploring possibilities for a pilot shuttle program along 10th Street, S.W., possibly to supplement an existing service that connects visitors to popular District destinations. A "Request for Information" was released to firms with expertise in autonomous vehicle development.

=== Budgeting ===
Bowser released the first budget of her second term in March 2019. The budget increased spending by 8.2%, though revenue growth was expected around 3%. D.C. auditor Kathy Patterson said the budget was not sustainable and fiscally irresponsible. Bowser responded by hailing her plan to make the DC Circulator free of charge.

On multiple occasions, D.C. government agencies under Bowser's authority and led by her appointees lost millions in federal money because deadlines were missed. Over the course of Bowser's first administration, the federal Department of Housing and Urban Development offered the D.C. Department of Housing and Community Development millions for lead remediation of its aging housing supply. The DHCD target of remediating lead paint in 225 homes was not met, federal grant money was not spent, and eventually the program closed.

In 2019, local organizations providing assistance to at-risk populations missed out on $3.75 million when the responsible D.C. Government body failed to submit a timely application. Eleanor Holmes Norton and other D.C. officials pleaded with federal authorities to grant D.C. leniency so that local programs including Reading Partners D.C., The Literacy Lab, and City Year D.C. could receive funding.

=== Campaign finance ===
In 2015, Bowser's allies formed FreshPAC, a political action committee intended to advance her agenda. The initiative was the first PAC in District politics so closely aligned with a sitting mayor and created by a former campaign treasurer. Thanks to a legislative loophole regulating off-year fundraising, FreshPAC accepted unlimited contributions. Bowser supporters had quickly raised more than $300,000 and had a goal of collecting $1 million by year's end. FreshPAC was chaired by Earle "Chico" Horton III, a lobbyist for a major corporation that sought Bowser's support. Many of the highest donors participated in a trip to China with the mayor. Following outcry from the Washington Post, members of the D.C. Council, and other stakeholders, FreshPAC was shut down in November 2015. Bowser said she thought FreshPAC was a good thing but its message was distorted.

In 2017, the D.C. Office of Campaign Finance fined Bowser's campaign committee $13,000 for accepting contributions beyond legal maximums during her 2014 mayoral campaign. The excess contributions totaled more than $11,000 from more than a dozen developers and contractors, as well as from landlord Sanford Capital, who the Bowser administration had been slow to fine despite being responsible for more than 1,000 housing code violations. Some of the same contributors later contributed to FreshPAC. Bowser's campaign returned the excess contributions.

In 2018, the D.C. Council unanimously passed campaign finance legislation that sought to remove the influence of developers and other large donors from politics by publicly financing campaigns. Bowser was staunchly opposed to the act and said that she would not provide financing for implementation of the law.

=== Contracting ===
In 2016, the head of D.C.'s Department of General Services resigned and contracting officials were fired following the award of a large construction project. One of the fired employees filed a $10 million whistleblower lawsuit alleging that he had been terminated for the failure to channel contracts to Fort Myer Construction, a major Bowser campaign donor; the other made similar allegations in an administrative proceeding. The episode prompted an investigation by Councilmember Mary Cheh. In 2017, Cheh's report found that in addition to the questionable firings, a city employee had illegally shared confidential information with Fort Myer about a competitor's bid on a separate project. The report found that the D.C. City Administrator - the top Bowser appointed official - had urged quick settlement of unresolved contract disputes with Fort Myer in an attempt to appease it. These actions led to $4 million in payouts to the firm, an outcome that the district has previously opposed. After fighting unsuccessfully to keep the findings from public view, Bowser refused to comment on any of the points in the report.

=== COVID-19 pandemic response ===
Black residents in D.C. were killed by COVID-19 at 5.9 times the rate of white people, the worst disparity in any major city. An investigation attributed the unequal toll to multiple strategic missteps by Bowser's administration. Among the shortcomings, a testing site was not established anywhere east of the Anacostia River and Bowser's health team was slow to solicit bids. In a rush to reopen the District in June 2020, her administration removed data from the government's website to avoid displaying how it had failed to meet a key metric.

In November 2020, Bowser traveled to Delaware with senior staff for a celebration of Joe Biden's victory despite the elevated risk of Coronavirus in the state and a travel advisory discouraging visits. She claimed the trip to the festivities was "essential" while critics pointed out that she violated her own protocols.

As the pandemic subsided and vaccines became more readily available, Bowser's instructions on masking created confusion and accusations of hypocrisy among business owners and the public. In April 2021, Bowser said patrons could go unmasked if they provided proof of vaccination. After backlash from businesses she rescinded the order. In response to the rising number of COVID-19 cases caused by the Delta variant, in July 2021, Bowser announced a new indoor mask mandate. On the day that the reinstated mandate took effect, she was found to have officiated an indoor wedding while unmasked.

In August 2021 Bowser implemented a vaccine mandate for all city employees. On January 15, 2022, she began enforcing a vaccine passports for D.C. residents called VaxDC. The policy required proof of vaccination for indoor venues and most meeting places. The vaccine mandate for public employees was successfully challenged in court by the D.C. Police Union. Judge Maurice Ross determined that Bowser had exceeded her legal authority in implementing the mandate. A month later, in February 2022, Bowser rescinded the vaccine passport.

Bowser went under scrutiny for her actions during the COVID-19 pandemic for attending protests to "defund the police" while restricting people of faith from meeting in religious gathering as a congregation, even outside.

=== Crime ===
During her first year as mayor, the district saw a 40% increase in homicides. Bowser sought to address the spike by proposing legislation allowing law enforcement officials to perform warrantless searches of violent ex-offenders. The bill was widely opposed by citizen's groups and the D.C. Council, and did not pass.

In 2016, District homicides fell by 17%, to 135, and dropped again in 2017 to 116, or about the same level prior to a 2015 spike. There were 160 homicides in 2018, an increase of 40% from the previous year and the most since 2015. Murders continued to rise in 2019, and by September 19, the homicide rate in the district reached 125, a 17% increase from the previous year. 2021 marked the fourth straight year of increasing homicides, including a weekend in May in which 11 people were shot in the District. By July 2021, DC had recorded 100 homicides, the earliest point in the year it had reached this milestone since 2003, and 217 killings were recorded by the end of the year, the highest in nearly two decades.

In 2021, carjackings in DC skyrocketed, reaching more than four times the level of the previous year. Following an attack in which a Pakistani Uber Eats driver Mohammad Anwar was murdered as the result of a brazen carjacking, Bowser released a tweet explaining that carjackings were a crime of opportunity, giving the impression that Anwar was responsible for his own death. Bowser later deleted the tweet, claiming that it was scheduled to go out before the death, but did not apologize or immediately offer any condolences to Anwar's family or condemnation of his killers, who are black, sparking backlash and accusations of racial bias.

In 2021, the district's forensic crime lab lost its accreditation following a probe that determined the lab concealed conflicting findings and pressured examiners to change results in a firearms case and other mistakes. The investigation led to a criminal investigation of the lab's errors and the resignation of its head, Jenifer Smith. Days after the news about the lab was first reported, Bowser honored Smith as part of the "Washington Women of Excellence Awards".

In 2023, the district experienced more homicides than in any other year since 1997. The uptick in homicides occurred while many other major cities saw a decrease in homicides in 2023. Bowser said that she believed the city's current approach to public safety allowed criminal offenders to avoid sufficient consequences.

=== Development ===
After Bowser took office in 2015, she created a new cabinet post to focus on development in the city's poorest areas. She named former Council candidate Courtney Snowden to the new position. In 2017, the Inspector General found that Snowden had improperly used city employees to care for her child. Bowser said that appropriate management action had been taken in response to staff babysitting, without specifying what was done.

In October 2017, Bowser announced a $3 million infusion into housing and retail projects in D.C. Wards 7 and 8 in an effort to remedy the scarcity of grocery stores in the district's poorest wards. District Wards 7 and 8 had only three grocery stores between them, or 50,000 people for every grocery store, compared to 10,000 per store in wealthy Ward 3. Bowser awarded $2.1 million to the Jair Lynch group for redevelopment of a shopping center, and $880,000 to South Capitol Affordable Housing to assist in building out the Good Food Markets project, which also includes 195 units of affordable housing as well as commercial space. Previous attempts to attract grocery stores to these areas have failed.

In September 2015, Bowser announced a deal with Monumental Sports owner Ted Leonsis to build a practice facility for the Washington Wizards. Under the deal, district taxpayers would pay 90% of the estimated $55 million cost. The government's portion was split between direct government expenditure and Events DC, a D.C.-government-funded body which operates with an independent board. In July 2016, before construction had started, it was announced that costs would exceed estimates by $10 million while the number of seats in the facility would likely decrease. Under the agreement with the developer, the district will be responsible for cost overruns. Once the CareFirst Arena was completed, operations costs exceeded estimates and the Events DC board approved more than $1 million in additional costs to cover the shortfall. A contract for a firm to find naming rights for the facility was funded at $180,000 per year.

In May 2019, the D.C. auditor found that the Housing Production Trust Fund, which gives developers funding for affordable housing, had awarded funding to proposals that scored poorly and in one case received the lowest score. The successful but low-rated projects were all proposed by developers who had made contributions to the mayor's campaign.

Bowser was involved in securing a deal to build a new stadium for the Washington Commanders.

=== Education ===
In 2015, D.C. Public Schools chancellor Kaya Henderson routinely bent or broke school placement rules to give preferential treatment to well-connected parents seeking prized enrollments at particular D.C. public schools. Two senior Bowser appointees were among seven parents who benefited from Henderson's misuse of authority by being permitted to bypass the competitive DCPS lottery system. Deputy Mayor Courtney Snowden, who makes $196,000 a year, jumped a waitlist of more than 1000 names to enroll her child. In 2018, it was revealed that Bowser's recently appointed Schools chancellor Antwan Wilson had similarly manipulated the system to transfer Wilson's teenage daughter to a preferred school. Wilson and other staff resigned while Bowser refused a request to testify about Wilson's statement that she was aware of the placement, calling an inquiry "political circus". By 2018, management of D.C. Public Schools prompted investigation by the Federal Bureau of Investigation, the U.S. Department of Education and the D.C. Office of the Inspector General.

=== Emergency services ===
In February 2016, Bowser's appointee as medical director of the fire department resigned from her post after one year on the job. Explaining her decision, Jullette Saussy said that she could not be complicit in a failed agency and that its performance was putting Washingtonian's lives at risk. In response, Bowser's spokesperson said that she was committed to achieving change.

In February 2022, Bowser reappointed Karima Holmes to lead the Office of Unified Communications, a position she previously held for six years. During her earlier period as director, the city's 911 system fell short of national standards and resulted in fatal consequences when first responders were sent to the wrong address.

=== Environment ===
In January 2018, Bowser announced a $4.7 million investment in two islands in the Anacostia River, 45 acre Kingman Island and 5 acre Heritage Island. She also designated portions of each island as a "state conservation area", which restricts their use to limited purposes including recreation and education. The funds will be used for improvements to the islands, including outdoor classrooms, walkways, a floating lab platform and bathrooms.

=== Government transparency ===
In early 2018, the members of the D.C. Board of Ethics and Government Accountability voted unanimously not to renew the contract of Traci Hughes, head of D.C.'s government transparency entity, the Office of Open Government. Activists said Hughes was being punished for her enforcement of District regulations on government transparency. In the preceding year, she had faulted at least two public boards controlled by Bowser appointees for failure to comply with the city's Open Meetings Act, and had issued a decision that the board of United Medical Center, the district's troubled public hospital, had broken that law by secretly discussing and voting to close the facility's nursery and delivery rooms. Hughes said after her dismissal that she had had to resist pressure to ease off in her role of policing District agencies' compliance with the Open Meetings Act and Freedom of Information Act; and that she had been subjected to "personal attacks in an effort to keep [her] from issuing an opinion" relating to Open Meetings Act compliance by the D.C. Commission on Selection and Tenure of Administrative Law Judges.

=== Gun control ===
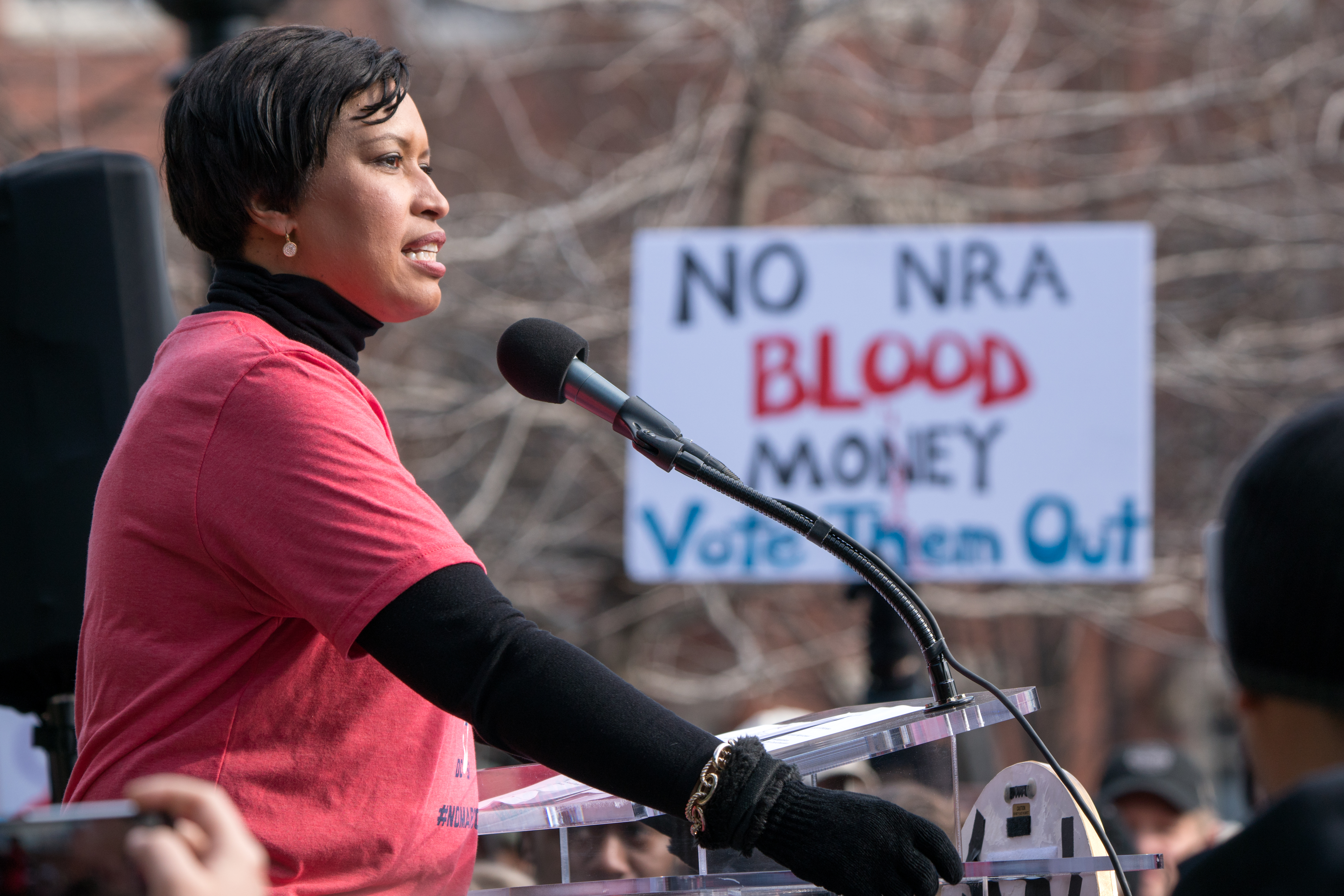
Bowser at a March for Our Lives rally in 2018

Bowser is a strong advocate of gun control, characterizing herself in her inaugural speech in January 2015 as "a mayor who hates guns". Bowser has encouraged the D.C. Council to ban bump stocks, with the aim of highlighting the issue of gun control to congress. "Americans are demanding common-sense action, and as leaders, we must listen and act. Bump stocks, which turn already dangerous weapons into lethal machines, have no place in our society," said Mayor Bowser. Bowser was also "unusually supportive" of the March for Our Lives rally in Washington, D.C. in March 2018, and in 2018 was said to be positioning herself as a national figure in the gun control movement.

=== Health care ===
In 2016, United Medical Center was the sole government-owned hospital in D.C. In March of that year, on the advice of the Director of Health Care Finance, the D.C Council awarded the management of UMC to Veritas, a two-year-old politically connected firm. The husband of the Veritas CEO was a major donor to the Bowser campaign in 2014, and a longtime health care executive with experience overseeing troubled hospitals.

Veritas, however, failed to improve the quality of care and its tenure saw several cases of preventable patient deaths and negligence. By March 2017, the director of D.C.'s Department of Health was warning the UMC board about serious safety lapses in the hospital's obstetrics unit. By August, the Department of Health had shut down the ward due to its failure to meet minimum standards. Earlier, in July 2017, the hospital allowed a week to pass between the death of a nursing home patient and notification to his family. In August, another patient died under questionable circumstances. In September, the nurses union voted "no confidence" in the hospital's leadership and said that it had failed to address unsafe nurse-patient ratios and a lack of proper equipment. Bowser administration officials refused repeated requests to disclose the specific medical lapses, and ultimately the council voted to remove Veritas.

The opioid epidemic ravaged D.C., with a higher rate of fatal overdoses in 2017 among African Americans in D.C. than whites in West Virginia or New Hampshire. Though funding was available, the Department of Behavioral Health failed to establish adequate treatment programs. In December 2018, the district announced an "ambitious" plan aiming to cut opioid deaths by half within about two years, using a combination of treatment, tracking and education. The plan was written by a "group of D.C. agencies, doctors, substance abuse treatment providers, council members and individuals in recovery." Several of the plan's recommendations were described as "vague", or merely expanding on existing programs.

Upon taking office in 2015, Bowser set a goal to halve the number of HIV/AIDS cases in the district by 2020. In 2019, the District continued to have one of the highest rates in the country. The number of diagnoses in the previous year was 360, decreasing by 13 and 5 during each of the previous two years of Bowser's term.

=== Homelessness ===
Bowser pledged to end chronic homelessness in the district. In 2018, the results of an annual survey required by federal law reflected a 7.6% drop in the homeless population from 2017, following a 17.3% drop the year before. The estimated total homeless population of 6,904 was, however, still slightly higher than it had been in 2013.

Bowser's approach to resolving the homelessness issue, focusing on homeless families, has been the subject of criticism. During the winter of 2015, the district saw an increase of more than 250% over any previous year, in homeless families housed in shelters and overflow motel rooms, although part of the increase was due to the administration's decision to move families into motel rooms before freezing temperatures would require it do so under the law.

In February 2016, Bowser unveiled a plan to provide housing for homeless families following the closure of District of Columbia General Hospital. Without any community consultation or input, Bowser announced the location of one shelter in each of the district's eight wards and refused to say how the sites were selected.

In March 2016, it was revealed that many of the sites selected were connected to Bowser's contributors. Under Bowser's plan, the monthly cost per unit was $4,500 on average each year for at least the next 20 years. Frustrated by the D.C. Council's efforts to devise its own plan, Bowser lashed out with expletives at Chairman Phil Mendelson.

=== Housing ===
In 2018, Bowser nominated Joshua Lopez, former chief campaign aide to both Bowser and ex-Mayor Adrian Fenty, to serve on the board of the D.C. Housing Authority, which reviews contracts and sets policy for public housing. Over the objections of certain council members who considered Lopez unqualified for the position, Bowser proceeded with the nomination, which the Council approved by a vote of 10–3. In April 2018, Lopez held a loudspeaker at a rally while a representative of the Nation of Islam spoke, calling Councilmember Elissa Silverman "a fake jew". Bowser called upon Lopez to apologize but resisted public calls for his resignation.

In October 2021, the chair of the D.C. Housing Authority, Neil Albert, abruptly resigned after it was revealed that he had channeled multiple contracts to a romantic partner. While Chair, Albert had awarded the Housing Authority's headquarters to a developer, who hired his partner as the architect of record. Bowser had championed Albert's accomplishments in the months before his departure and responded to news that Albert's home had been raided by the FBI with a statement that she holds employees to high standards. Bowser's replacement for Albert, Dionne Bussey-Reeder, owed thousands in unpaid income taxes leading the government to place liens on her property, in violation of DCHA bylaws.

=== Immigration ===
Upon the election of Donald Trump to the presidency, and following statements by the President-elect threatening to pull federal funding from sanctuary cities, Bowser issued a statement reaffirming the district's status as a sanctuary city. Soon thereafter, Bowser was confronted by a throng of about 100 protesters who were angry that she had not responded more forcefully—as had mayors of some other sanctuary cities—in denouncing Trump's policies and in defending immigrants. In January 2017, following Trump's inauguration and the issuance of an executive order threatening to withhold Federal funding from sanctuary cities, Bowser affirmed that the District would maintain its status as such.

In November 2017, Bowser announced that the district was joining seven other cities in a partnership with the National Immigration Forum to assist some 2,000 green card holders who work for the D.C. Government, as well as family members, in applying for U.S. citizenship. The partnership would provide information, legal help, citizenship test coaching and assist in finding language classes. Participation in the program could save an applicant as much as $2,000 in legal fees.

In 2022, the governors of Texas and Arizona instituted policies to offer migrants released by federal authorities in their states free bus rides to Washington, D.C. Since April 2022, over 9,000 migrants have been sent to D.C. from the two states. Bowser stated that the city and the nation was facing a "migrant crisis" and criticized the governors of Texas and Arizona for what she characterized as "political gamesmanship". Bowser has twice requested assistance from the National Guard in managing the migrants and was denied both times. On September 8, 2022, Bowser declared a public emergency in D.C. and established an Office of Migrant Services to provide services to migrants arriving from Texas and Arizona.

=== Policing ===
Bowser's administration repeatedly blocked the release of stop and frisk data as required by the NEAR Act.

Although Bowser supported the outfitting of Metropolitan Police Department with body cameras, out of 25 involved officer shootings from 2016 to 2018, only three instances of body cam footage were released as of April 2019.

=== Protests ===
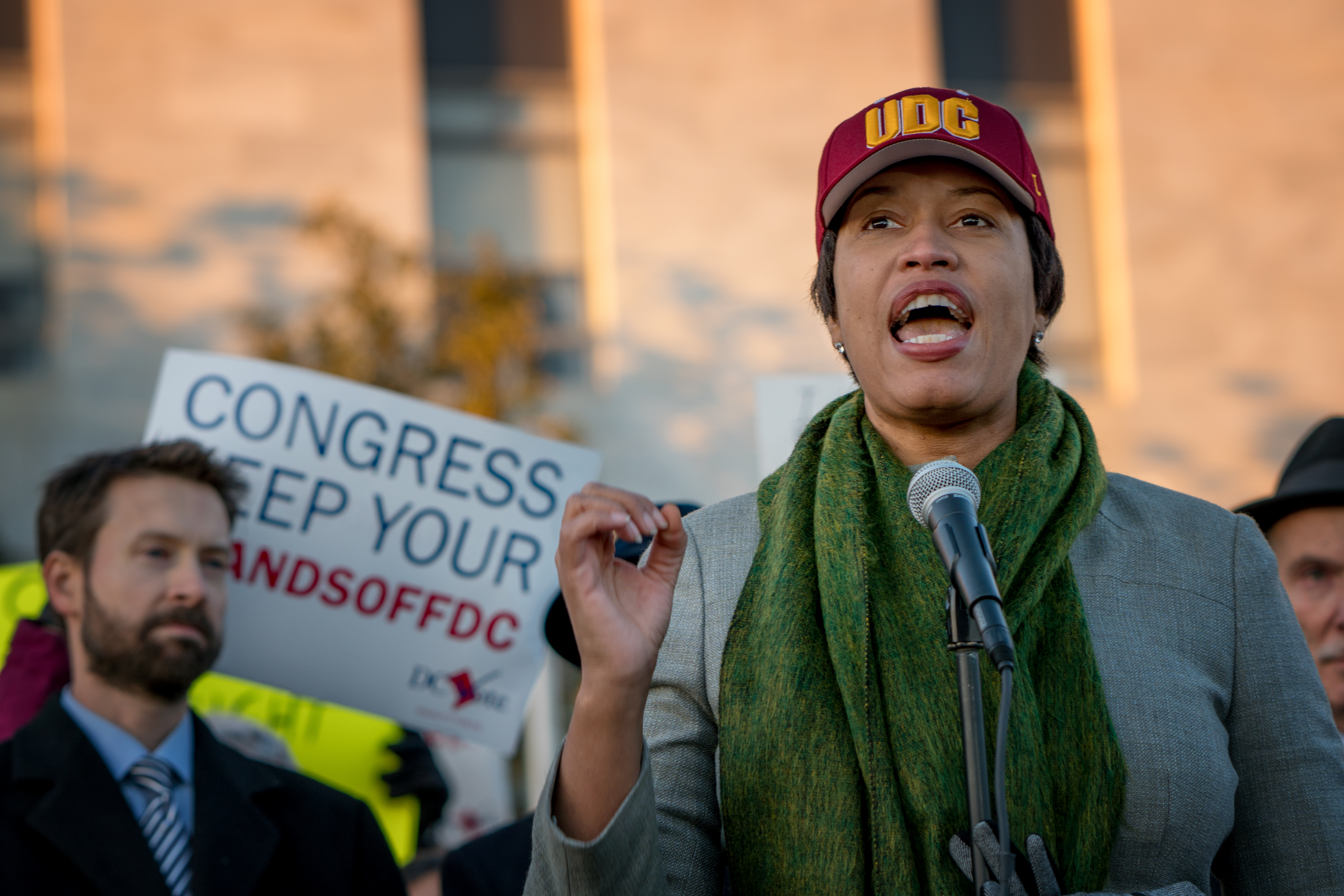
Bowser speaking at a protest in 2017

Mayor Bowser demonstrated support for the Black Lives Matter movement following the murder of George Floyd and the subsequent protests. She renamed the stretch of 16th Street NW in front of the White House, "Black Lives Matter Plaza" and had a mural painted spanning the entire street. DC-based leaders of Black Lives Matter said the act was a distraction from real policy changes and called on the Mayor to defund the police. In response, Black Lives Matter organizers painted "DEFUND THE POLICE" in the same bright letters, feet away from the mural Bowser ordered. Bowser declined the offer of 10,000 national guard personnel, days before the protest occurred, and ordered troops that had already been stationed there to leave the district.

On January 6, 2021, pro-Trump rioters and insurrectionists stormed the US Capitol, in protest of the results of the 2020 presidential election, in which Democrat Joe Biden defeated incumbent Republican President Donald Trump. Bowser imposed a curfew in response, to 6:00 pm that night and end at 6:00 am the following day, though it was ignored by numerous pro-Trump rioters and insurrectionists.

During the 2021 Cuban protests in July, the words "CUBA LIBRE" (translated to "FREE CUBA") were painted in front of the Cuban embassy in support of the Cuban people and opposition to the country's communist regime. By July 20, the words were removed by the Bowser administration, who classified the words as "unauthorized". Bowser received criticism for her double standard of praising Raul Castro in 2016, her allowance of painting "Black Lives Matter" on the same street and her future plans to make the area a permanent dedication to Black Lives Matter.

=== Public services ===
In January 2016, traffic throughout the D.C. region was paralyzed by an inch of snow on untreated roads. More than 1,000 accidents were reported and some commuters abandoned their cars amidst impassable roads. Bowser apologized for an inadequate response in the District, explaining that "we should have been there earlier."

For a larger storm later in the same season, a report by the D.C. auditor found that the district had spent over $40 million on removal, much of it charged to the district's credit cards. The district incurred tens of thousands of dollars in credit card fees. In an unprecedented move, JPMorgan Chase shut off the government's line of credit until some of the card balances could be paid. Some of the contractors who benefited most from the snow removal expenses were important Bowser donors, the D.C. auditor found.

=== Public utilities ===
In October 2015, Bowser changed her position to support the $6.4-billion merger between two public utilities, Exelon and Pepco. Opponents of the merger decried the lack of transparency in the deal and Bowser's reversal. Community activists raised ethics concerns, claiming that Bowser was swayed by a $25 million pledge to rename the future MLS Soccer Stadium as Pepco Park. In December 2015, it was revealed that Exelon had paid the chairman of FreshPAC, a political action committee affiliated with Bowser's allies, as a lobbyist.

=== Sexual harassment ===
In December 2017, Bowser ordered that 30,000 employees of the district receive sexual harassment training by February 2018. Under the order, 1,500 supervisors must also complete advanced, in-person training. At the time, Bowser administration personnel could not say how much taxpayers had paid to resolve sexual harassment claims against the city, or how many such claims there had been. In March 2018, it was reported that taxpayers had recently spent at least $735,000 to settle such suits. Bowser's aides acknowledged they did not have a full grasp of the problem, and the city plans to set up a system to track complaints and settlements.

=== Traffic safety ===
In 2015, Bowser announced a Vision Zero traffic safety initiative that aims to eliminate all traffic fatalities by 2024. To launch the event, Bowser, supporters, and D.C. government employees stood at intersections and waved green signs imploring motorists to slow down. The following year, the number of traffic fatalities increased from 26 to 28 and the number of crash injuries increased from 12,122 to 12,430. Pedestrian fatalities within the total dropped from 15 to 9, during a period when pedestrian deaths nationally had jumped upward by 11%. In 2017, traffic fatalities continued to rise. Following a pair of biking fatalities in the summer of 2018, cyclists protested that Bowser had failed at promoting traffic safety. In 2019, a prominent bike advocate was struck and killed by a driver along a stretch of road that was known to be dangerous.

In May 2020, Bowser announced that the default speed limits in D.C. would be reduced to 20 mph, claiming that "slower speeds can help improve safety". While overall traffic declined during the pandemic, D.C. reported 37 traffic fatalities in 2020, the most in over a decade. 2021 was deadlier, and by mid-November, the number of traffic deaths had already reached 2020's level.

=== Transportation ===
As part of her first State of the District Address in March 2015, Bowser promised to get the DC Streetcar "up and running". In September, Bowser as well as the director of the D.C. Department of Transportation promised that the streetcar would be operational by the end of the year. The H Street/Benning line began public service operations on February 27, 2016. She later oversaw the closing of the line, one of the few places in the United States in the 2020s to actually shutter rail infrastructure. Many criticized the constant delays in extending the line which greatly affected ridership with some sources bluntly blaming the mayor's lack of vision and leadership: "Failure wasn’t inevitable, but Bowser and Mendelson guaranteed it."

=== Youth services ===
In April 2016, the D.C. Trust, a government-funded entity that disbursed grants throughout the District to non-profits providing youth services, declared bankruptcy and announced plans to dissolve. The decision was attributed in part to overspending by and for staff at the agency. The agency, also known as the City Youth Investment Trust Corp., had suffered a history of abuse and mismanagement. Former councilmember Harry Thomas Jr. was found guilty on felony charges for embezzling $350,000 of the trust's funds between 2007 and 2009. In 2013, Congressional investigators concluded that the agency lacked controls to properly administer a $20 million-a-year, federally funded school-voucher program. Then in January 2016, the agency's board, four of whom had been appointed by Mayor Bowser, learned that a former executive director and a former senior financial officer had used funds to pay tens of thousands of dollars in credit-card charges, including some for personal use. Bowser had recently provided $700,000 in taxpayer funding to the agency. The board members did not know how much of the funding remained or how youth services could be continued.

In 2019, a 9 year old and a 10 year old were handcuffed by the Metropolitan Police Department in separate incidents, sparking public outrage after videos of the incidents were circulated. While the attorney general said that he would review department policies, Bowser said that "every case is different" and asked whether it was appropriate to circulate photos of juveniles.

=== Involvement in national politics ===
In mid-May 2016, ahead of the 2016 District of Columbia Democratic primary, Bowser endorsed Hillary Clinton's presidential candidacy.

Bowser delivered a speech at the 2016 Democratic National Convention, in which she advocated for D.C. statehood.

In late January 2020, Bowser endorsed Michael Bloomberg's campaign in the 2020 Democratic Party presidential primaries. In March, after Bloomberg had withdrawn from the race, she endorsed Joe Biden's campaign.

At the 2020 Democratic National Convention, Bowser delivered a speech remotely from Black Lives Matter Plaza.

== 2018 election ==
Bowser filed to run for re-election in 2018. James Butler, Ernest E. Johnson, and Jeremiah D. Stanback filed to run against her in the Democratic Party primary election. Ann C. Wilcox filed to run as a D.C. Statehood Green Party candidate. No one filed as a mayoral candidate in either the Republican Party primary election or the Libertarian Party primary election. Noting the nominal opposition and some "stumbles" during her first term, The Washington Post endorsed Bowser's re-election, citing the district's economic prosperity and Bowser's having fulfilled her promise to restore integrity to government. She then won the June 19 Democratic primary with 83% of the vote, after her most formidable potential challenger, former mayor Vincent C. Gray, declined to enter the race. She went on to win the November 8 general election with just under 80% of the vote against two Independent candidates and one Libertarian.

During the election, Bowser sought to unseat incumbent councilmember Elissa Silverman, who had frequently questioned the mayor. Bowser endorsed political newcomer Dionne Reeder and provided her with volunteer and fundraising support. Reeder lost by a significant margin and Bowser was not able to deliver a victory in her home base of Ward 4.

== Electoral history ==
=== 2004 ===
2004 Advisory Neighborhood Commission, 4B09, general election
Party	Candidate	Votes	%
Democratic	Muriel E. Bowser	966	98
	write-in	22	2

=== 2006 ===
2006 Advisory Neighborhood Commission, 4B09, general election
Party	Candidate	Votes	%
Democratic	Muriel E. Bowser	601	90
	write-in	70	10

=== 2007 ===
2007 Council of the District of Columbia, Ward 4, special election
Party	Candidate	Votes	%
Democratic	Muriel Bowser	5,064	40
Democratic	Michael A. Brown	3,433	27
Democratic	Charles Gaither	683	5
Democratic	Dwight E. Singleton	602	5
DC Statehood Green	Renee Bowser	583	5
Democratic	Graylan Scott Hagler	468	4
Democratic	Tony Towns	390	3
Democratic	Robert G. Childs	339	3
Democratic	Artee Milligan	170	1
Independent	Judi Jones	154	1
Democratic	Carroll Green	117	1
Democratic	Lisa P. Bass	110	1
Democratic	Douglas Ned Sloan	98	1
Democratic	Marlena D. Edwards	97	1
Democratic	T. A. Uqdah	82	1
Democratic	Lisa Comfort Bradford	72	1
Democratic	Michael T. Green	49	0
Democratic	James Clark	17	0
Democratic	Roy Howell	10	0
	write-in	29	0

=== 2008 ===
2008 Council of the District of Columbia, Ward 4, Democratic Party primary election
Party	Candidate	Votes	%
Democratic	Muriel Bowser	7,132	75
Democratic	Baruti Jahi	1,800	19
Democratic	Paul E. Montague	302	3
Democratic	Malik F. Mendenhall-Johnson	236	2
	write-in	58	1

2008 Council of the District of Columbia, Ward 4, general election
Party	Candidate	Votes	%
Democratic	Muriel Bowser	30,888	97
	write-in	936	3

=== 2012 ===
2012 Council of the District of Columbia, Ward 4, Democratic Party primary election
Party	Candidate	Votes	%
Democratic	Muriel Bowser	7,541	66
Democratic	Renee L. Bowser	1,523	13
Democratic	Max Skolnik	1,042	9
Democratic	Baruti Jahi	619	5
Democratic	Judi Jones	371	3
Democratic	Calvin Gurley	268	2
	write-in	32	0

2012 Council of the District of Columbia, Ward 4, general election
Party	Candidate	Votes	%
Democratic	Muriel Bowser	33,045	97
	write-in	933	3

=== 2014 ===
2014 Mayor of the District of Columbia, Democratic Party primary election'
Party	Candidate	Votes	%
Democratic	Muriel E. Bowser	42,045	43
Democratic	Vincent C. Gray (incumbent)	31,613	33
Democratic	Tommy Wells	12,393	13
Democratic	Jack Evans	4,877	5
Democratic	Andy Shallal	3,196	3
Democratic	Vincent Orange	1,946	2
Democratic	Reta Lewis	490	1
Democratic	Carlos Allen	120	0
	write-in	235	0

2014 Mayor of the District of Columbia, general election
Party	Candidate	Votes	%
Democratic	Muriel E. Bowser	88,439	54
Independent	David A. Catania	57,375	35
Independent	Carol Schwartz	11,625	7
DC Statehood Green	Faith Dane	1,348	1
Libertarian	Bruce Majors	1,164	1
Independent	Nestor Djonkam	421	0
	write-in	1,493	1

=== 2018 ===
2018 Mayor of the District of Columbia, Democratic Party primary election
Party	Candidate	Votes	%
Democratic	Muriel Bowser (incumbent)	58,431	80
Democratic	James Quincy Butler	7,532	10
Democratic	Ernest E. Johnson	4,444	6
Democratic	Write-in	2,787	4
Total votes		73,194	100

2018 Mayor of the District of Columbia, general election
Party	Candidate	Votes	%
Democratic	Muriel Bowser (incumbent)	162,199	80
DC Statehood Green	Ann Wilcox	19,979	10
Independent	Dustin Canter	14,783	7
Libertarian	Martin Moulton	7,152	3
Total votes		204,113	100

=== 2022 ===
Democratic primary results
Party	Candidate	Votes	%
Democratic	Muriel Bowser (incumbent)	62,391	49.01
Democratic	Robert White	51,557	40.50
Democratic	Trayon White	11,193	8.79
Democratic	James Butler	1,753	1.38
Write-in		406	0.32
Total votes		127,300	100
n/a	Overvotes	219	
n/a	Undervotes	812	

2022 Washington, D.C., mayoral election
Party	Candidate	Votes	%	±%
Democratic	Muriel Bowser (incumbent)	137,206	74.66	−1.73
Independent	Rodney Grant	27,355	14.88	N/A
Republican	Stacia Hall	10,743	5.85	N/A
Libertarian	Dennis Sobin	2,366	1.29	−2.08
Write-in		6,115	3.33	-0.70
Total votes		183785	100	

== Personal life ==
Bowser is a lifelong Catholic.

In 2015, Bowser bought a home in Colonial Village, moving from a Riggs Park duplex where she had lived since 2000.

In May 2018, Bowser announced that she had adopted a baby daughter.

Bowser's eldest sister, Mercia, died of COVID-19 on February 24, 2021. Her father, Joe Bowser, died on August 2, 2024, at the age of 88.

== See also ==
- List of mayors of the 50 largest cities in the United States
- List of female governors in the United States

Party political offices
Preceded by Vincent Gray	Democratic nominee for Mayor of the District of Columbia; 2014, 2018, 2022	Succeeded by Janeese Lewis George
Political offices
Preceded by Vincent Gray	Mayor of the District of Columbia; 2015–present	Incumbent
