= 1970 United States Senate election in New York =

- November 3, 1970
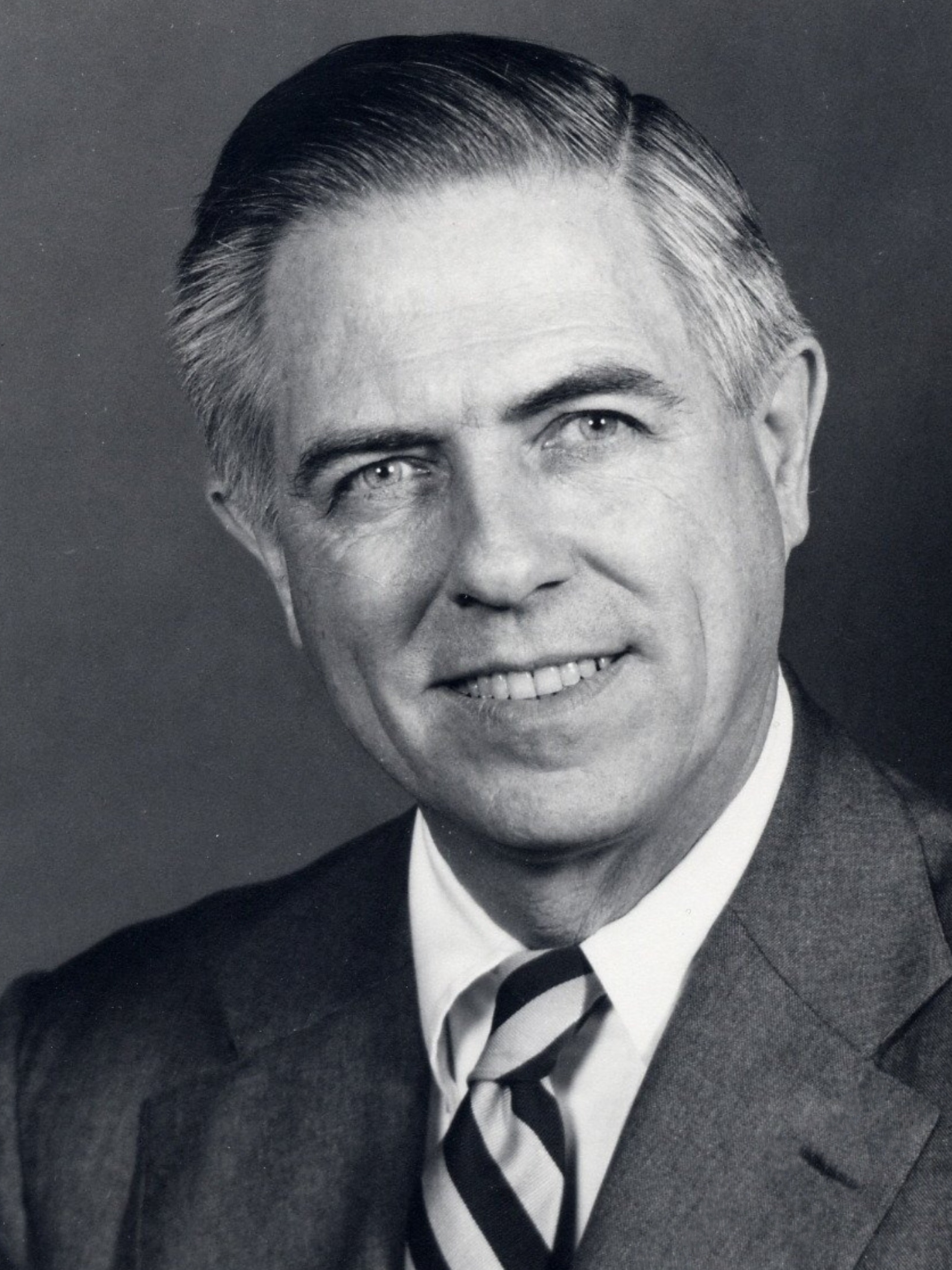

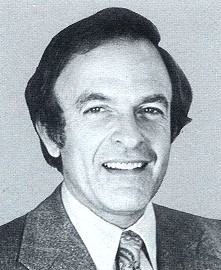

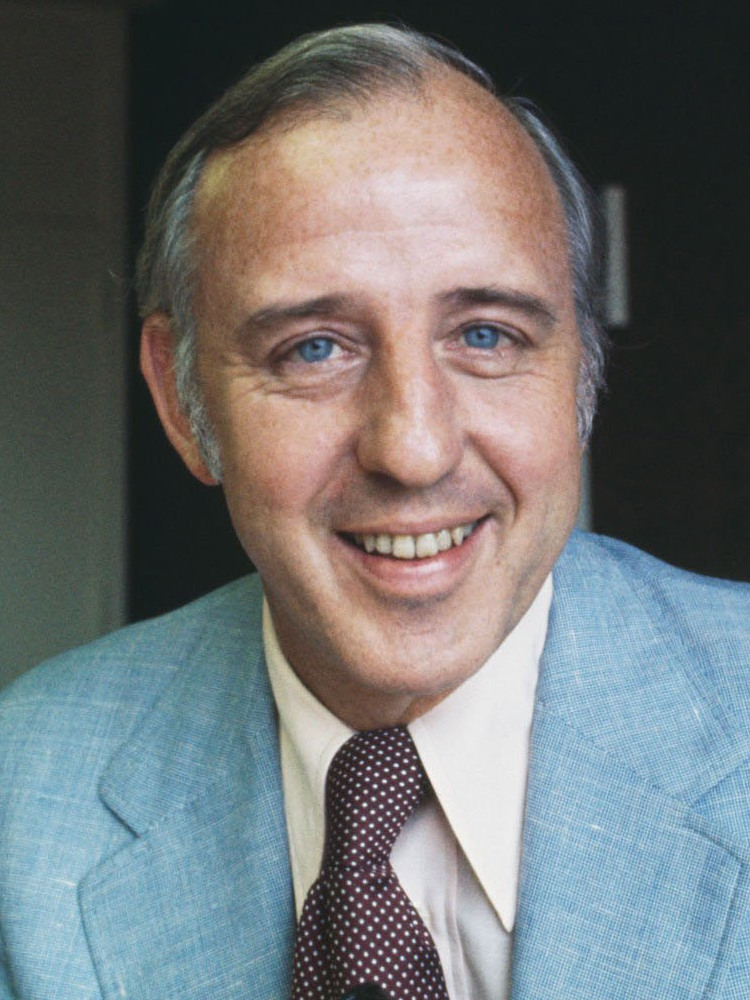
Nominee	James L. Buckley	Richard Ottinger	Charles Goodell
Party	Conservative	Democratic	Republican
Alliance	Independent Alliance		Liberal
Popular vote	2,288,190	2,171,232	1,434,472
Percentage	38.75%	36.77%	24.29%
- County results Buckley: 30–40% 40–50% 50–60% 60–70% Ottinger: 30–40% 40–50% Goodell: 30–40% 40–50% 50–60%
U.S. senator before election
Charles Goodell
Republican
Elected U.S. Senator
James L. Buckley
Conservative

The 1970 United States Senate election in New York was held on November 3, 1970. U.S. representative Charles Goodell, who had been appointed to serve the remainder of Robert F. Kennedy's term following Kennedy's assassination, ran for re-election. Although he was endorsed by the Republican and Liberal parties, Goodell finished third behind James L. Buckley and Richard Ottinger. Buckley, the Conservative Party nominee, won with less than 39 percent of the vote as left-of-center vote was split between Ottinger and Goodell.

Goodell was appointed by Governor Nelson Rockefeller in September 1968. Rockefeller scheduled the special election to complete Kennedy's term for 1970 concurrent with his own re-election campaign, despite legal efforts to force him to hold it concurrent with the 1968 presidential election. In early April 1970, Goodell was nominated for a full term by the Republican Party, and Buckley was nominated by the Conservative Party. In May, the Liberal Party nomination was given to Goodell over the four Democratic candidates in the race: U.S. representatives Richard Ottinger and Richard D. McCarthy, New York City Council president Paul O'Dwyer, and former White House counsel Ted Sorensen. Ottinger rounded out the general election field by defeating O'Dwyer in the Democratic primary on June 23.

In the general election, Goodell's opposition to President Richard Nixon and American involvement in the Vietnam War led many conservative New Yorkers to support Buckley. Buckley would serve in the Senate until his re-election bid was defeated by Daniel Patrick Moynihan in 1976.

== Interim appointment ==
In 1964, Robert F. Kennedy was elected United States senator after establishing residence in Glen Cove. He won the Democratic and Liberal nominations. In the general election, he defeated Republican incumbent Kenneth Keating. In 1968, Kennedy ran for the Democratic Party presidential nomination. After winning four primaries, Kennedy was assassinated on June 6 by Sirhan Sirhan.

As a result of the vacancy, Governor Nelson Rockefeller was entitled to appoint a replacement to fill the seat until a successor could be duly elected. John W. Gardner, John Lindsay, Burke Marshall, C. Douglas Dillon, Charles Goodell, Ogden Reid, and Whitney Young were considered candidates for the appointment. On August 11, a Rockefeller spokesman stated that the main choices for the appointment were Gardner, Goodell, and Reid. On September 10, Rockefeller appointed Goodell to fill the vacancy.

=== Appointment ===
- Charles Goodell, U.S. representative from Jamestown

=== Potential candidates not appointed ===
- C. Douglas Dillon, former U.S. secretary of the treasury
- John W. Gardner, former U.S. secretary of health, education and welfare
- John Lindsay, mayor of New York City and former U.S. representative from the Upper East Side
- Burke Marshall, IBM general counsel and former assistant U.S. attorney general
- Ogden Reid, U.S. representative from Purchase
- Whitney Young, executive director of the National Urban League

== Scheduling ==
On July 16, 1968, Joseph A. Valenti filed a lawsuit in the Western District Court against Governor Rockefeller, attempting to have a special election held during the 1968 election cycle, rather than the 1970 election cycle. Randolph Phillips and George Backer filed similar lawsuits in the Southern District Court on July 17, and July 19. On January 20, 1969, the Southern District Court dismissed their cases, allowing for Goodell to serve the remainder of Kennedy's term until a regular election was held in 1970.

== Conservative and Independent Alliance nominations ==
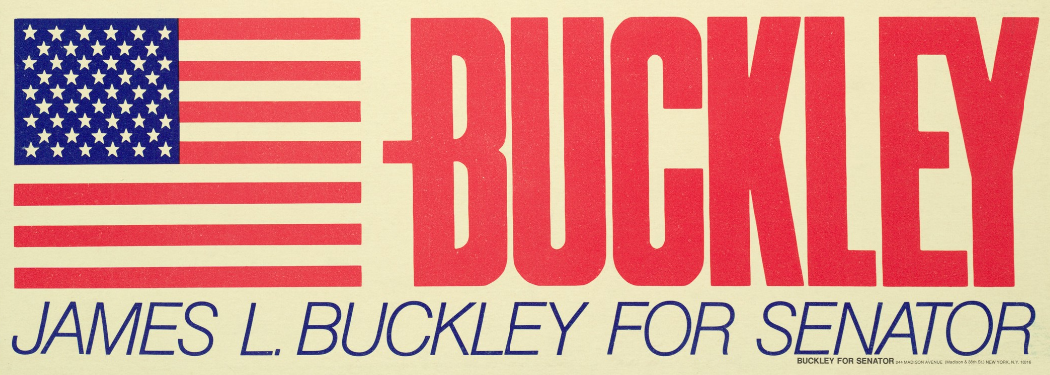
James L. Buckley's campaign logo

=== Candidates ===
- James L. Buckley, 1968 nominee for Senate and brother of William F. Buckley Jr.
- Kevin P. McGovern, lawyer

==== Declined ====
- William F. Buckley Jr., conservative author and 1965 nominee for New York City mayor
- John J. Marchi, state senator from Staten Island and 1969 Republican nominee for mayor

On January 28, 1970, Kevin P. McGovern announced that he would seek the Conservative Party's senatorial nomination and criticized the party's leadership for allegedly favoring state senator John J. Marchi. On April 6, James L. Buckley, the brother of conservative author William F. Buckley Jr. and the party's former senatorial nominee in 1968, announced that he would seek the nomination.

=== Results ===
The Conservative State Committee convened inside Hotel McAlpin in Manhattan, New York City, on April 7, to select the party's nominees in the general election. McGovern attempted to force a primary campaign between him and Buckley, but failed to receive the 25% of delegate votes to force a primary. Buckley received nearly ninety percent of the delegate votes and the remainder was split between McGovern and abstaining delegates.

1970 Conservative Party United States Senate ballot
Party	Candidate	Votes	%	±%
Conservative	James L. Buckley	379.1	89.14%	
Conservative	Kevin P. McGovern	35.8	8.42%	
Conservative	Abstention	10.4	2.45%	
Total votes		425.3	100.00%	

=== Independent Alliance Party ===
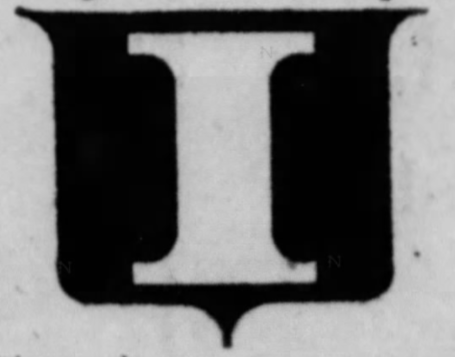
The second ballot emblem of the Independent Alliance Party

On June 20, 1970, F. Clifton White, James L. Buckley's campaign manager, announced that Buckley's campaign would circulate petitions in an attempt to gain another ballot line named the Independent Alliance Party. Enough valid signatures were collected to gain the additional ballot line, but Secretary of State John P. Lomenzo ruled that the Independent Alliance's emblem, an outline of New York with Buckley's name inside, was illegal as New York's election law limited the number of times that a candidate's name could appear on a ballot line to one. Lomenzo later allowed the party onto the ballot after the emblem was changed to a shield with the letter "I" inside.

Rockefeller, who was running for reelection in the gubernatorial election, and Buckley appeared in the same voting column in New York City due to the ballot design in which Rockefeller's Civil Service Independents ballot line was combined with Buckley's Independent Alliance. Although the Independent Alliance Party received over 100,000 votes in the general election, more than the 50,000 votes required to become an official party and automatic ballot access, it did not become an official party as its only candidate was Buckley, who ran in the Senate election and not in the gubernatorial election where the 50,000 votes were required to come from.

== Republican nomination ==
=== Candidates ===
- Charles Goodell, incumbent United States Senator and former member of United States House of Representatives from New York's 38th congressional district

==== Disqualified ====
- James L. Buckley, Conservative nominee in the 1968 Senate election and brother of William F. Buckley Jr.

=== Campaign ===
On March 24, Charles Goodell announced his campaign for a full term in office in front of 250 people at the Park Central Hotel. Goodell criticized Richard Nixon's record on civil rights, military spending, and the Vietnam War, as well as Nixon's nomination of G. Harrold Carswell to the Supreme Court.

James L. Buckley attempted to enter the Republican senatorial primary, but was rejected by the Republican State Committee.

On April 8, the day after Buckley's nomination by the Conservatives, the Republican state committee met to select Republican nominees for multiple offices. Goodell faced no opposition, but 49 committee members, from Nassau, Suffolk, and Queens counties, chose to abstain rather than to vote for him. The entire 28-member Nassau County delegation abstained due to Goodell's lack of support for Nixon, but chose to not nominate another candidate as that could lead to primary challenges in the state legislator and accusations of not being “real Republicans”. Joseph Margiotta, the Nassau County Chairman, also stated that abstaining would not anger Governor Nelson Rockefeller, who supported Goodell.

=== Results ===
1970 Republican Party United States Senate ballot
Party	Candidate	Votes	%	±%
Republican	Charles Goodell (incumbent)	311	86.39%	
Republican	Abstain	49	13.61%	
Total votes		360	100.00%	

== Liberal nomination ==
=== Candidates ===
- Charles Goodell, interim U.S. senator since 1968 and former U.S. representatives from Jamestown (also running as Republican)
- Richard D. McCarthy, U.S. representative from Buffalo (also running as Democratic)
- Paul O'Dwyer, former New York City Council member and 1968 nominee for Senate (also running as Democratic)
- Richard Ottinger, U.S. representative from Pleasantville (also running as Democratic)
- Ted Sorensen, former White House counsel (also running as Democratic)

=== Campaign ===
The Liberal Party's nomination was electorally important as due to New York's electoral fusion law the party could give its nomination, and a large percentage of the popular vote, to any other party nominee. In the 1968 Senate election incumbent Republican Senator Jacob Javits had defeated Paul O'Dwyer by over one million votes, with half of that total coming from the Liberal Party's ballot line.

On April 4, 1970, the state committee selected Timothy W. Costello to serve as the party's placeholder senatorial candidate. The committee selected placeholder candidates for multiple positions as New York law allowed for parties to replace their nominees within five weeks of selecting them. Due to the selection of Costello, who was serving as Deputy Mayor of New York City, Leon A. Katz, a member of the New York City Council, called for Mayor John Lindsay to fire Costello.

Goodell was favored by officials in the Liberal Party due to criticism levied against him by members of the Republican and Conservative state committees and his opposition to the Vietnam War. Costello also endorsed Goodell before the nomination ballot. On May 11, Goodell received the party's nomination.

Prior to the ballot voting O'Dwyer accused the party of rigging the ballot in favor of Goodell and stated that his nomination would be a betrayal to liberal voters.

1970 Liberal Party United States Senate ballot
Party	Candidate	Votes	%	±%
Liberal	Charles Goodell		67.00%	
Liberal	Paul O'Dwyer		16.00%	
Liberal	Richard D. McCarthy		11.00%	
Liberal	Richard Ottinger		4.00%	
Liberal	Ted Sorensen		2.00%	
Total votes			100.00%	

== Democratic nomination ==
=== Candidates ===
- Richard D. McCarthy, U.S. representative from Buffalo (withdrew April 2; re-entered race April 19) (also running as Liberal)
- Paul O'Dwyer, former New York City Council member and 1968 nominee for Senate (also running as Liberal)
- Richard Ottinger, U.S. representative from Pleasantville (also running as Liberal)
- Ted Sorensen, former White House counsel (also running as Liberal)

==== Withdrew ====
- Morris B. Abram, lawyer and former president of Brandeis University (endorsed Sorensen)
- Benjamin Rosenthal, U.S. representative from Queens (ran for re-election)

==== Declined ====
- Jonathan B. Bingham, U.S. representative from the Bronx
- Bill Moyers, former White House press secretary
- Otis G. Pike, U.S. representative from Riverhead
- Howard J. Samuels, administrator of the Small Business Administration and 1966 nominee for lieutenant governor
- Samuel S. Stratton, U.S. representative from Schenectady and 1964 candidate for Senate
- Adam Walinsky, former advisor to John F. Kennedy

On May 12, 1969, Ted Sorensen claimed that he had been asked to run for the seat prior to Kennedy's assassination. Sorensen started to actively campaign for the nomination in October 1969. On July 12, 1969, Paul O'Dwyer, the party's 1968 nominee for Senate, announced that he would seek the nomination. O'Dwyer formally announced his campaign in New York City on December 11, and in Albany on December 12.

In 1969, state party chair John J. Burns met with congressmen Richard Ottinger, Benjamin Rosenthal, Jonathan B. Bingham, and Otis G. Pike in Washington to discuss plans to avoid a divisive primary. Richard D. McCarthy of Buffalo, who had not attended the Burns meeting, stated on January 12 that he was interested in running. On January 19, 1970, Ottinger announced that he would seek the nomination as a "unity candidate." On January 29, Rosenthal announced an exploratory bid, pledging not to enter the race if it would threaten Democratic unity. Ottinger formally announced his candidacy on February 24, and Rosenthal withdrew his exploratory efforts on March 4 to seek re-election. On February 27, McCarthy announced that he would seek the Democratic nomination.

On February 23, Brandeis University president Morris B. Abram resigned from office to seek the Democratic nomination. However, the Poughkeepsie board of elections ruled Abram ineligible, because he had only registered with the party on January 26. Under state election law, he could only run in the primary after the 1970 general election, unless he won a majority of delegates at the Democratic state convention. A survey of party officials showed little support for Abrams due to his decision to sit out the 1968 presidential election. Abram withdrew and endorsed Ted Sorensen on April 9.

=== Campaign ===
Joseph Zaretzki, the state senate minority leader, referred to O'Dwyer as the only candidate with a "tremendous chance of winning the Democratic designation" due to his statewide organization. However, he was criticized for his refusal to support Hubert Humphrey in the 1968 presidential election.

On April 2, McCarthy dropped out to maintain party unity. He re-entered the primary on April 19, arguing that upstate New York lacked representation in the race because the remaining candidates were from the New York metropolitan area.

==== Convention ====
The Democratic state convention met Liberty from March 31 to April 2. Sorensen received 62 percent of the delegate vote, making him the designated candidate for the primary to 25 percent for O'Dwyer, who gained automatic ballot access, and 12 percent for Ottinger. Ottinger and all other candidates had to petition their way onto the primary ballot by securing over 10,000 signatures. After the convention, Ottinger filed 26,463 petition signatures, and McCarthy filed 17,080.

1970 Democratic Party United States Senate ballot
Party	Candidate	Votes	%	±%
Democratic	Ted Sorensen		≈62.00%	
Democratic	Paul O'Dwyer		~25.00%	
Democratic	Richard Ottinger		≈12.00%	
Total votes		345	100.00%	

=== Endorsements ===
Paul O'Dwyer

United States House of Representatives

- Shirley Chisholm, member of the United States House of Representatives from New York's 12th congressional district (1969–1983)

Local officials

- Robert F. Wagner, Jr., 102nd Mayor of New York City (1954–1965)
Ted Sorensen

Organizations

- Orleans County Democratic committee

Local officials

- Mike Lazar, member of the New York City Council from Queens

Notable individuals

- Morris B. Abram, lawyer and former president of Brandeis University

=== Results ===
Ottinger won the June 23 primary with over 366 thousand votes. O'Dwyer carried New York City but finished over 60 thousand votes behind Ottinger. Sorensen placed a distant third, and McCarthy placed fourth, carrying only his home county, Erie County, and neighboring Cattaraugus and Wyoming.

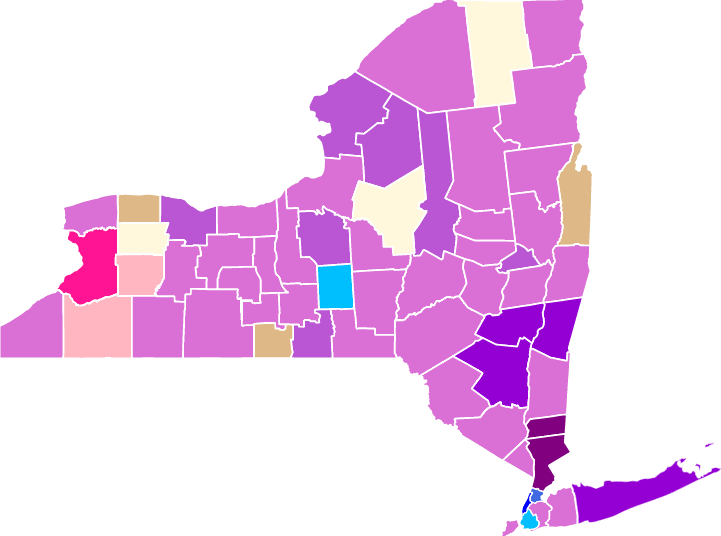
Democratic primary results by county Ottinger: 30–50% 50–70% 70–80% O'Dwyer: 30–40% 40–50% 50–60% Sorensen: 30–40% 40–50% McCarthy: 30–40% 60–70%

1970 Democratic Party United States Senate primary
Party	Candidate	Votes	%
Democratic	Richard Ottinger	366,789	39.61%
Democratic	Paul O'Dwyer	302,438	32.66%
Democratic	Ted Sorensen	154,434	16.68%
Democratic	Richard D. McCarthy	102,224	11.04%
Total votes		925,885	100.00%

== General election ==
=== Candidates ===
- James L. Buckley, 1968 nominee for Senate and brother of William F. Buckley Jr. (Conservative, Independent Alliance)
- Kipp Dawson, national coordinator of the Student Mobilization Committee to End The War in Vietnam (Socialist Workers)
- John Emanuel, 1968 nominee for Senate and 1969 nominee for New York City mayor (Socialist Labor)
- Charles Goodell, interim U.S. senator since 1968 and former U.S. representative from Jamestown (Republican, Liberal)
- Arnold Johnson, CPUSA public relations director (Communist)
- Richard Ottinger, U.S. representative from Pleasantville (Democratic)

==== Conservation Party ====
On July 15, 1970, Ottinger's campaign announced that it would circulate petitions in an attempt to gain another ballot line named the Conservation Party. Buckley criticized the party as an attempt to confuse voters who wished to vote for the Conservative Party. Ottinger's campaign claimed that conservation was chosen for the party's name to reflect Ottinger's support for environmental protection.

In August, Ottinger filed petitions with a total of 33,561 signatures, more than the 12,000 required, to gain the additional ballot line. However, Mason Hampton, the attorney of the Nassau County Conservative Party, filed 24 objections with the board of elections over the Conservation Party and Representative James F. Hastings filed an objection to Secretary of State John P. Lomenzo over the party's name on August 24.

On September 4, Lomenzo ruled that the Conservation Party's name was too similar to the Conservative Party's name and ruled the Conservation Party off of the general election ballot. Ottinger made an appeal to the New York Supreme Court, and on September 17, the state Supreme Court ruled that the Conservation Party could appear on the ballot. However, the Conservative Party made an appeal to the Appellate Division of the state Supreme Court and on October 1, the court ruled in favor of removing the Conservation Party from the general election ballot. Ottinger made an appeal to the New York Court of Appeals, but on October 7, the Court of Appeals ruled four to three to sustain the decision of the appellate court decision.

=== Campaign ===
In the general election, Goodell attempt to appeal to liberal and independent anti-war voters, which cost him support among Republican leadership and voters. In June, Goodell said he would not support Nixon in the 1972 presidential election if the United States did not withdraw from Southeast Asia and pledged to run his campaign without any support from the Nixon administration or the Republican National Committee, despite his campaign struggling financially. Republican voters and local organizations quickly threw their support to Buckley. On July 1, the Dutchess County Republican Party voted 55 to 21 to not support Goodell, and the Ulster County Republican Party chose to not take a position on the Senate election and told voters to choose for themselves. On July 8, the Franklin County Republican Party voted unanimously to endorse Buckley. On August 25, the Norwich Republican committee endorsed all of the Republican candidates, except for Goodell, as four of the eight committee members chose to abstain.

In August, Goodell attempted to reverse his decline with Republicans by claiming that he was a better supporter of Nixon than senators Barry Goldwater and Strom Thurmond, having supported Nixon in 48 percent of his votes compared to Goldwater's 37 percent. Goodell also expressed support for the invasion of Cambodia as a tactical campaign but argued that it would drag the war on.

Nixon declined to endorse Buckley or Goodell. Goodell claimed that Nixon supported the Republican slate and only chose not to endorse Goodell because he had asked Nixon to not do so, and Buckley countered that Goodell was attempting to "turn any misfortune of the campaign to his advantage." Despite Nixon's silence, vice president Spiro Agnew actively criticized Goodell repeatedly. On September 30, he claimed Goodell had "left the party" and joined the "awful liberal-radical coalition" to obstruct Nixon's policies, and Nixon had reportedly approved the statement. Senate minority leader Hugh Scott and liberal Republican senators Jacob Javits, Edward Brooke, and Mark Hatfield criticized Agnew's comments, and Goodell called on Nixon to keep Agnew out of the election. Goodell offered to debate Agnew, but Agnew declined. On October 8, Agnew called Goodell "the Christine Jorgensen of the Republican Party," comparing Goodell to the American soldier who had famously undergone sex reassignment surgery in the 1950s.

On October 30, Liberal Party leadership including Stanley Shaw of Queens, Paul Siminoff of Syracuse, Basil Kyriakakis of Rochester, and New York City Council minority leader Eldon R. Clingan called for an emergency meeting of the state executive committee to consider switching their nomination from Goodell to Ottinger in order to prevent a Buckley victory.

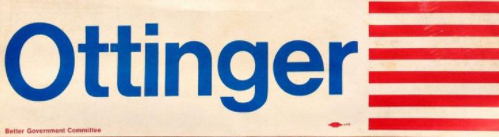
Richard Ottinger bumper sticker

=== Debates ===
On September 14, a debate was held between Buckley, Goodell, and Ottinger at the New York State Publishers Association dinner, with a four-person panel asking questions. During the debate, Goodell and Ottinger stated that the $100,000 bail for the Panther 21 was unconstitutional, and supported the direct election of the president, while Buckley stated that the bail was constitutional and supported the present use of the electoral college to select the president.

A televised debate was held on October 11, between Buckley, Goodell, and Ottinger, by WABC-TV. Goodell and Ottinger argued against the Vietnam War, and criticized Nixon's foreign policy in Latin America as likely to lead to "more Vietnams." Buckley supported the war and stated that leaving Vietnam would undermine the trust of other small countries in the United States. Another televised debate between the candidates was held on October 18.

=== Endorsements ===
James L. Buckley

Organizations

- Franklin County Republican Party
- Oneida Republican City Committee
- Uniformed Firefighters Association, firefighters union

United States House of Representatives

- James J. Delaney, member of the United States House of Representatives (1945–1947; 1949–1978)
- Hamilton Fish III, member of the United States House of Representatives from New York's 26th congressional district (1920–1945)
- Martin B. McKneally, member of the United States House of Representatives from New York's 27th congressional district (1969–1971)

State legislators

- Emeel S. Betros, member of the New York State Assembly (1969–1980)
- Edward J. Keenan, member of the New York State Assembly
- Edwyn E. Mason, member of the New York State Assembly
- Robert Watson Pomeroy, member of the New York State Senate (1965–1966)
- William T. Smith, member of the New York State Senate (1963–1986)

Local officials

- Fred J. Eckert, Greece Town Supervisor
- Vincent R. Impellitteri, 101st Mayor of New York City (1950–1953)

Newspapers

- Daily News, daily newspaper
- Democrat and Chronicle, daily newspaper
- Rochester Times-Union, daily newspaper

Notable individuals

- Reid Buckley, author and brother of James L. Buckley and William Buckley, Jr.
- Marion Crain, widow of Irving Ives, former United States Senator from New York
Charles Goodell

Governors

- Nelson Rockefeller, 49th Governor of New York (1959–1973)

United States Senate

- J. Caleb Boggs, United States Senator from Delaware (1961–1973)
- Clifford P. Case, United States Senator from New Jersey (1955–1979)
- Marlow Cook, United States Senator from Kentucky (1968–1974)
- Mark Hatfield, United States Senator from Oregon (1967–1997)
- Jacob Javits, United States Senator from New York (1957–1981)
- Charles H. Percy, United States Senator from Illinois (1967–1985)
- William B. Saxbe, United States Senator from Ohio (1969–1974)

State legislators

- Lawrence E. Corbett, Jr., member of the New York State Assembly (1963–1972)

Local officials

- Timothy W. Costello, Deputy Mayor of New York City
- John Lindsay, 103rd Mayor of New York City (1966–1973)

Newspapers

- Dunkirk Evening Observer, daily newspaper
- The New York Times, newspaper based in New York City

Notable individuals

- Daniel Berrigan, Jesuit priest
- Philip Berrigan, Catholic priest
- Malcolm Boyd, Episcopal priest
- Noam Chomsky, political theorist and activist
- William E. Doulin, chairman of the Orange County Republican Party
- Jane Fonda, actress and political activist
- Betty Friedan, feminist activist
- Coretta Scott King, political activist and widow of Martin Luther King, Jr.
- Charles T. Lanigan, chairman of the New York Republican Party
- Rogers Morton, chairman of the Republican National Committee (1969–1971)
- David Schoenbrun, journalist
- William Sloane Coffin, clergyman and peace activist
- Benjamin Spock, pediatrician and political activist
- Gloria Steinem, feminist
- George Wald, Nobel Prize recipient
- Howard Zinn, historian
Richard Ottinger

United States Senator

- Eugene McCarthy, United States Senator from Minnesota (1959–1971)

United States House of Representatives

- Ed Koch, member of United States House of Representatives from New York's 17th and 18th congressional districts (1969–1977)
- Benjamin Stanley Rosenthal, member of United States House of Representatives from New York's 6th, 8th, and 7th congressional districts (1962–1983)

Local officials

- Bess Myerson, Commissioner of New York City Department of Consumer Affairs (1969–1973)
- Paul O'Dwyer, member of the New York City Council (1963–1965)
- Robert F. Wagner, Jr., 102nd Mayor of New York City (1954–1965)

Newspapers

- Newsday, daily newspaper
- New York Post, daily newspaper

=== Polling ===
Poll source	Date(s)	Sample size	Charles Goodell (R, L)	Richard Ottinger (D)	James L. Buckley (C)	Other / undecided (Note: Calculated by taking the difference of 100% and all other candidates combined.)
New York Daily News	November 2, 1970	5,025 (Note: Straw votes)	25%	32%	37%	6%
New York Daily News	November 2, 1970	588 (Note: Live interviews)	23%	32%	38%	7%
WMCA-FM	October 27, 1970	[data missing]	35%	19%	42%	4%
New York Daily News	October 26, 1970	[data missing]	23%	32%	39%	6%

=== Results ===
Buckley won the general election with slightly less than 39 percent of the vote. Although he recently only 8,408 more votes on the Conservative Party line than Ottinger, his Independent Alliance line expanded his lead by another 108,550 votes. Goodell finished a distant third.

1970 U.S. Senate election in New York
Party	Candidate	Votes	%	±%
Conservative	James L. Buckley	2,179,640	36.91%	+34.33%
Independent	James L. Buckley	108,550	1.84%	+1.84%
Total	James L. Buckley	2,288,190	38.75%	+36.17%
Democratic	Richard Ottinger	2,171,232	36.77%	−18.74%
Republican	Charles Goodell (incumbent)	1,178,679	19.96%	−17.74%
Liberal	Charles Goodell (incumbent)	225,793	3.82%	−0.34%
Total	Charles Goodell (incumbent)	1,434,472	24.29%	−13.41%
Communist	Arnold Johnson	4,097	0.07%	+0.07%
Socialist Workers	Kipp Dawson	3,549	0.06%	+0.01%
Socialist Labor	John Emanuel	3,204	0.05%	−0.04%
Total votes		5,904,744	100.00%	
Conservative gain from Republican				

== Aftermath ==
Buckley ran for re-election in 1976 with the support of the Republican Party but was defeated by Democratic nominee Daniel Patrick Moynihan. Although the Independent Alliance Party received over 100,000 votes, more than the 50,000 votes required to become an official party and automatic ballot access, it did not become an official party because it did not run a candidate in the gubernatorial election.

== See also ==
- 1970 United States Senate elections

== Works cited ==
- Soyer, Daniel (2021). Left in the Center: The Liberal Party of New York and the Rise and Fall of American Social Democracy. Cornell University Press. ISBN 9781501759888. JSTOR 10.7591/j.ctv1hw3x50.2.
