= 2018 Washington, D.C., mayoral election =

- November 6, 2018
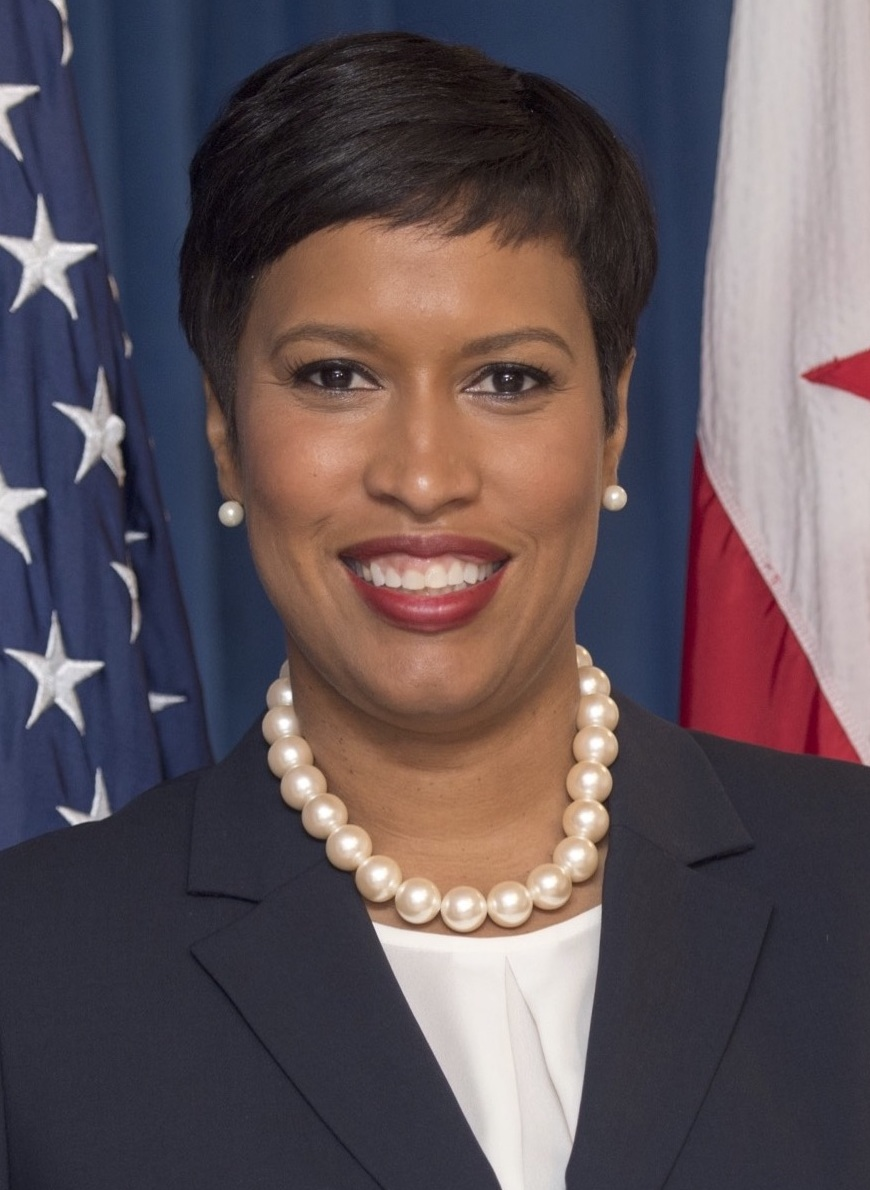

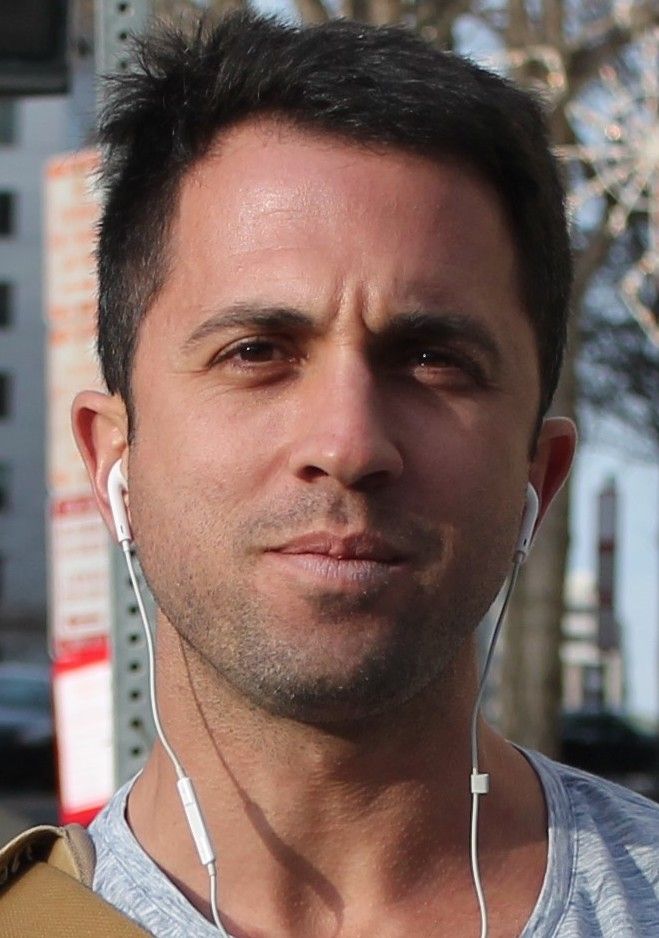
Candidate	Muriel Bowser	Ann Wilcox	Dustin Canter
Party	Democratic	DC Statehood Green	Independent
Popular vote	171,608	20,950	15,478
Percentage	76.38%	9.32%	6.88%
- Bowser: 60–70% 70–80% 80–90%
Mayor before election
Muriel Bowser
Democratic
Elected mayor
Muriel Bowser
Democratic

On November 6, 2018, Washington, D.C., held an election for its mayor. Incumbent Democrat Muriel Bowser won re-election, becoming the first mayor to do so for Washington, D.C., since Anthony A. Williams won a second term in 2002.

In the first 80 days of her re-election campaign, Bowser raised about $1.4 million for her campaign fund. She had no serious challengers in the primary, with only some little-known candidates filing to run against her. Bowser won the June 19 primary with 80% of the vote.

== Democratic primary ==
=== Candidates ===
==== Declared ====
- Muriel Bowser, incumbent mayor
- James Butler, Advisory Neighborhood Commissioner in Ward 5
- Ernest E. Johnson, real estate professional, unsuccessfully ran for mayor in 2010 and for D.C. Council in 2014

==== Declined ====
- Vincent C. Gray, Ward 7 D.C. Councillor and former mayor
- Karl Racine, Attorney General of the District of Columbia

=== Primary results ===
Results by ward: Bowser—80–90% Bowser—70–80% Bowser—60–70%

District of Columbia Democratic primary election, 2018
Party	Candidate	Votes	%
Democratic	Muriel Bowser (incumbent)	61,855	80.0
Democratic	James Butler	7,915	10.2
Democratic	Ernest E. Johnson	4,674	6.0
Democratic	Write-ins	2,887	3.7
Total votes		77,331	100.0

== Libertarian primary ==
=== Candidates ===
==== Declared ====
- Martin Moulton

==== Results ====
Results by ward: Moulton—100% Moulton—>90% Moulton—80–90% Moulton—70–80% Moulton—80–90% Moulton/Write-ins tie—50%

District of Columbia Libertarian primary election, 2018
Party	Candidate	Votes	%
Libertarian	Martin Moulton	98	81.0
Libertarian	Write-ins	23	19.0
Total votes		121	100.0

== Green primary ==
=== Candidates ===
==== Declared ====
- Ann C. Wilcox, former Ward 2 DC Board of Education member, 1994–1998

==== Results ====
Results by ward: Wilcox—>90% Wilcox—80–90% Wilcox—70–80% Wilcox—50–60%

District of Columbia Green primary election, 2018
Party	Candidate	Votes	%
DC Statehood Green	Ann C. Wilcox	379	82.2
DC Statehood Green	Write-ins	82	17.8
Total votes		461	100.0

== Independents ==
=== Candidates ===
==== Declared ====
- Dustin "DC" Canter

== Results ==
Washington, D.C. mayoral election, 2018
Party	Candidate	Votes	%
Democratic	Muriel Bowser	171,608	76.4
DC Statehood Green	Ann Wilcox	20,950	9.3
Independent	Dustin Canter	15,478	6.9
Libertarian	Martin Moulton	7,569	3.4
n/a	Write-ins	9,053	4.0
Total votes		224,658	100
