= Margaret Scully Zimmele =

American artist

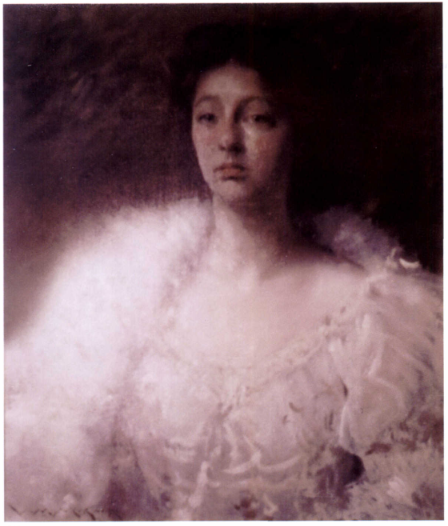
- portrait by William Merritt Chase
- Born: September 1, 1872; Pittsburgh
- Died: January 23, 1964 (aged 91); Chevy Chase (town)
- Occupation: Artist
- Relatives: Cornelius D. Scully

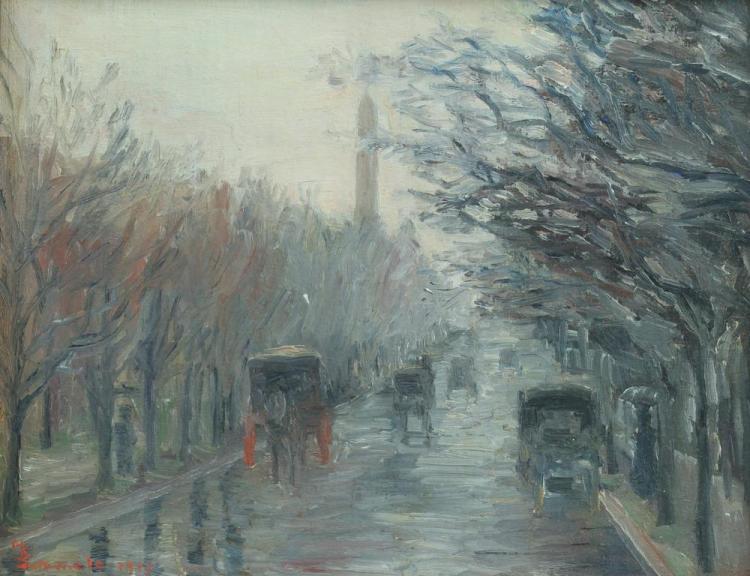
The Washington Monument in the Mist

Margaret Scully Zimmele (September 1, 1872 – January 23, 1964) was an American artist.

Margaret Scully Zimmele was born on September 1, 1872, in Pittsburgh. She was the daughter of John Sullivan Scully, a wealthy Pittsburgh financier, and Mary Elizabeth Negley. Her brother was Pittsburgh mayor Cornelius D. Scully.

She attended the Pennsylvania College for Women and graduated from the Pittsburgh School of Design for Women in 1891. In 1894, she trained in illustration at the Conservatory of Music in Boston. She married attorney George R. Waters in 1897, but he drowned the next year. She continued her art studies with a number of distinguished artists, including William Merritt Chase, Walter Shirlaw, Henry Keller, Sargent Kendall, Charles Hawthorn, William Whittemore, William Lathrop, Henry Snell, Daniel Garber, John F. Carlson, Henry Kirke Bush-Brown, and George Julian Zolnay. Chase painted her portrait, perhaps as a wedding present.

She and her parents moved to Washington, D.C., in 1902. In 1905, she married chemist Harry Bernard Zimmele. He died the next year from injuries he sustained when an automobile struck their carriage in Schenley Park. Margaret Zimmele was pregnant at the time and she named her daughter Harryette in his honor. Harryette died very young, in 1929.

Zimmele was an active artist and clubwoman in Washington, D.C., thorough her life. She was a founding member of the Arts Club of Washington and active in the Daughters of the American Revolution. One cause that Zimmele was particularly devoted to was anti-communism and created a series of propaganda postcards. She continued to paint until 1961, when she was the victim of a vicious attack with a hammer.

Margaret Scully Zimmele died on January 23, 1964 in Chevy Chase, Maryland.
