= Charles Goodell =

American politician and lawyer (1926–1987)

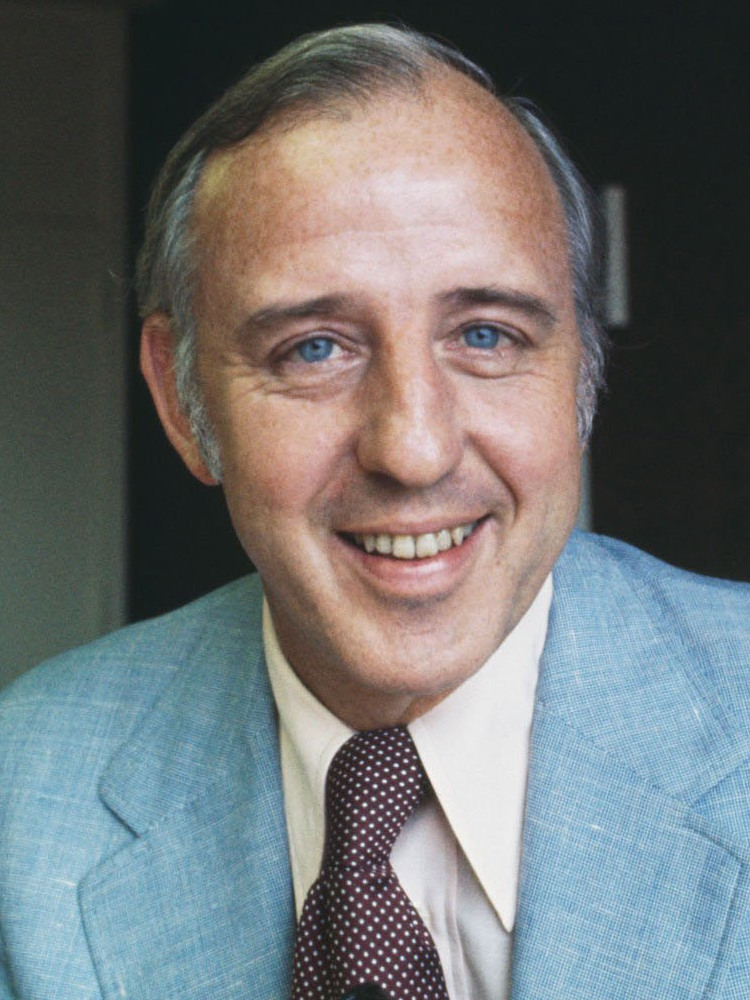
- Goodell in 1974

United States Senator from New York
- In office September 10, 1968 – January 3, 1971
- Appointed by: Nelson Rockefeller
- Preceded by: Robert F. Kennedy
- Succeeded by: James L. Buckley

Chair of the House Republican Research Committee
- In office February 23, 1965 – September 9, 1968
- Leader: Gerald Ford
- Preceded by: Position established
- Succeeded by: Robert Taft Jr.

Member of the U.S. House of Representatives from New York
- In office May 26, 1959 – September 9, 1968
- Preceded by: Daniel Reed
- Succeeded by: James F. Hastings
- Constituency: 43rd district (1959–1963); 38th district (1963–1968)

Personal details
- Born: Charles Ellsworth Goodell Jr. March 16, 1926 Jamestown, New York, U.S.
- Died: January 21, 1987 (aged 60) Washington, D.C., U.S.
- Party: Republican
- Spouses: Jean Rice (m. 1954; div. 1978); Patricia Goldman (m. 1978)
- Children: 4, including Roger
- Relatives: Andy Goodell (nephew)
- Education: Williams College (BA); Yale University (MA, LLB)

Charles Ellsworth Goodell Jr. (March 16, 1926 – January 21, 1987) was an American politician who represented New York in the United States House of Representatives from 1959 to 1968 and the United States Senate from 1968 to 1971. In both cases, he took office following the deaths of his predecessors, first in a special election and second as a temporary appointee succeeding Robert F. Kennedy.

He was elected to four full terms in Congress after winning his first race in 1959. He resigned on September 9, 1968, to accept an appointment by governor Nelson Rockefeller to fill the vacancy caused by the assassination of Senator Robert F. Kennedy on June 5, 1968. Having earned the support of both the Republican and Liberal parties in 1970, he lost in a three-way race to Conservative Party candidate James L. Buckley, having split the liberal vote with Democratic Party candidate Richard Ottinger.

Goodell was the father of National Football League (NFL) Commissioner Roger Goodell.

== Early life and education ==
Goodell was born in Jamestown, New York, the son of Francesca (née Bartlett) and Charles Ellsworth Goodell. He attended the public schools of Jamestown and graduated from Williams College as a member of Phi Beta Kappa in 1948. He served in the United States Navy during the World War II era as a seaman second class (1944–1946) and in the United States Air Force as a first lieutenant (1952–1953) during the Korean War.

Goodell received an LL.B. from Yale Law School in 1951 and an M.A. in government from Yale in 1952. He briefly taught at Quinnipiac College in 1952. Following his admission to the Connecticut bar (1951) and the New York bar (1954), he began his law practice in Jamestown. He was a great-grandson of William Goodell, an abolitionist.

== Congressional career ==
Goodell was a congressional liaison assistant for the Department of Justice from 1954 to 1955. He won a special election on May 26, 1959, as a Republican to the 86th United States Congress to fill the vacancy caused by the death of Daniel A. Reed. In District 43, Goodell received 27,454 votes (65%), with Democrat Robert E. McCaffery receiving 14,250 votes (33.8%).

Goodell was reelected in November 1960 to the 87th Congress and reelected three times thereafter. During his tenure in the House, Goodell voted in favor of the Civil Rights Acts of 1960, 1964, and 1968, and the Voting Rights Act of 1965, but voted against the 24th Amendment to the U.S. Constitution. Goodell opposed the 24th Amendment reluctantly, arguing on the floor before the vote that the amendment was deficient because it was limited to banning poll taxes for federal elections. He resigned on September 9, 1968, to accept governor Nelson Rockefeller's appointment to the United States Senate, filling the vacancy caused by the assassination of United States Senator Robert F. Kennedy on June 6, 1968. Because a special election to fill the vacancy would not be held for more than two years, public objection to the length of Goodell's appointment led to a failed legal challenge to the governor's power to appoint senators in the event of a vacancy, Valenti v. Rockefeller.

Although he had been a moderate-to- conservative member in the House, as a senator Goodell was nearly as liberal as New York's other Republican senator, Jacob Javits. In the Senate, Goodell authored and sponsored a large number of bills, including several to provide conservation and development aid to small towns and rural areas. Many small communities in upstate New York that lacked municipal sewage systems succeeded in establishing them thanks to federal matching funds made available through legislation sponsored by Goodell. Along with Oregon senator Mark Hatfield, Goodell was among the loudest anti-Vietnam War Republican voices. Antiwar protesters and activists praised his advocacy of a withdrawal from Vietnam.

In 1970, the New York Republican Party was split deeply over the issue of the Second New Right conservatism of much of the grassroots support for the party versus the perceived liberalism of the party organization, leadership and Governor Rockefeller himself. While Rockefeller's supporters were strong enough within the party and its regular organization to assure that Goodell would receive the party's nomination for his first full term, many conservative activists left the party to support candidates farther to the right. Vice President Spiro Agnew called Goodell the "Christine Jorgensen of the Republican Party," comparing his ideological shift to Jorgensen's highly publicized sex-change operation. Goodell ran under the slogan "Senator Goodell—He's too good to lose" and received the nomination of the Liberal Party as well as that of the regular Republican organization, an electoral fusion allowed under New York law.

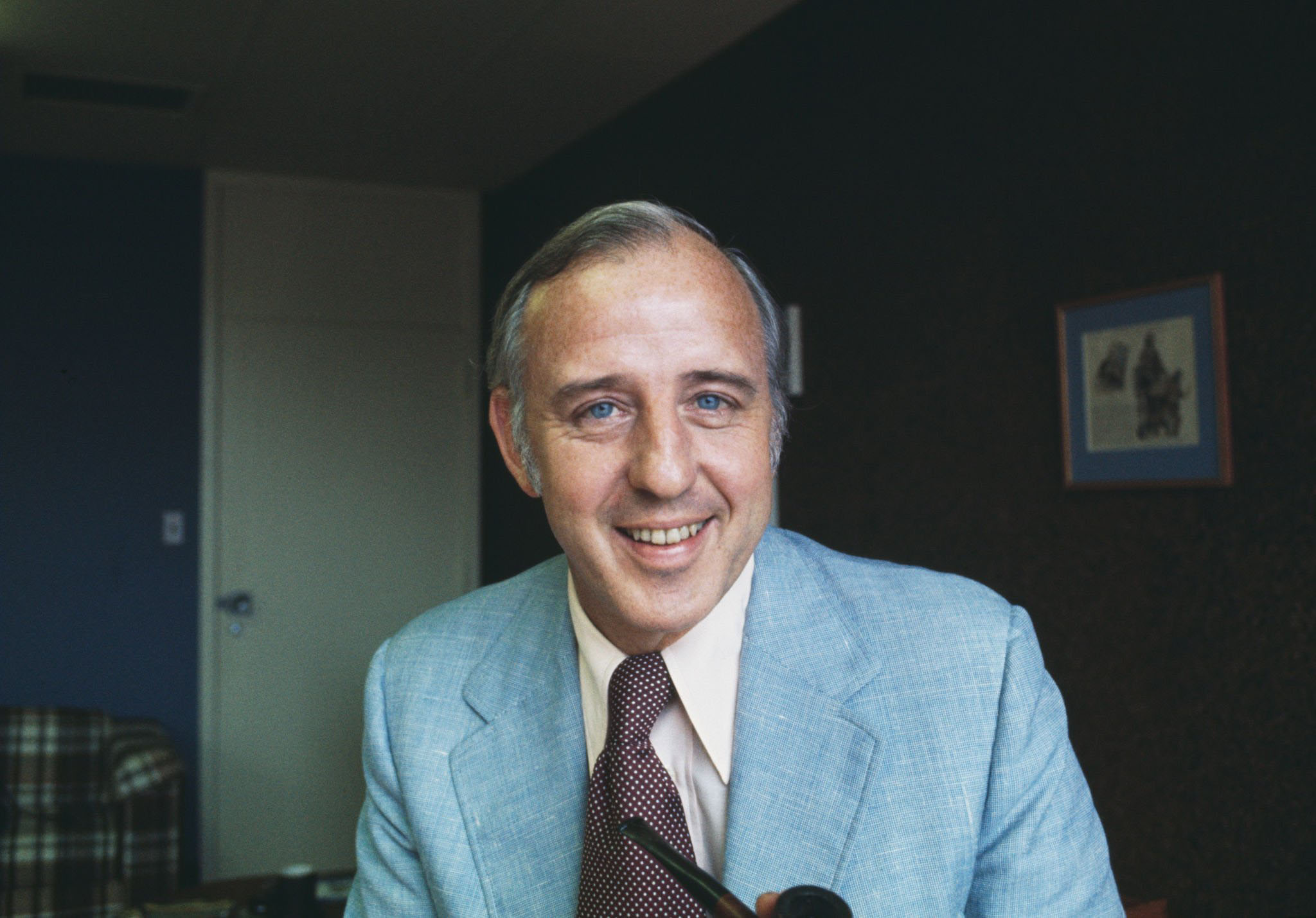
Goodell in 1974

A television ad aired by Goodell's 1970 campaign compared him to opponents Richard Ottinger and James L. Buckley as "the lightweight, the heavyweight and the dead weight." In the November 1970 election, despite Rockefeller's support and that of the Republican and Liberal parties, Goodell split the liberal vote with Ottinger and was defeated by Conservative Party candidate Buckley. Goodell finished third with 24.3% of the vote.

Goodell would be the last appointed senator from New York until 2009, when Kirsten Gillibrand was selected to replace Hillary Clinton, who had been appointed Secretary of State.

== After Congress ==
After leaving Congress, Goodell resumed practicing law. In the mid-1970s, he served as vice chairman, with former Pennsylvania governor William Scranton as chairman, of President Gerald Ford's committee to draft rules for granting amnesty to Vietnam War-era draft evaders and deserters.

== Personal life ==
Goodell married Jean Rice (1930–1984), a former registered nurse, in 1954. They had five children: Bill, a hedge fund executive; Tim, a senior vice president for the Hess Corporation; Roger, the commissioner of the NFL; Michael, a Pilates instructor, and Jeff, the former head of the Upper School of Saint Mary's Hall in San Antonio. Rice briefly ran for Congress in New York's 39th district in 1976. They were divorced in 1978. Goodell married Patricia Goldman (1942–2023), a congressional caucus director who later sat on the National Transportation Safety Board, in 1978.

Goodell was a resident of Washington, D.C. and Bronxville, New York, until his death of complications following a heart attack on January 21, 1987, at George Washington University Hospital. He was interred at Lake View Cemetery in Jamestown.

== Books ==
- Goodell, Charles E. Political Prisoners in America. New York: Random House, 1973.

U.S. House of Representatives
Preceded by Daniel Reed	Member of the U.S. House of Representatives from New York's 43rd congressional district 1959–1963	Constituency abolished
Preceded by Jessica M. Weis	Member of the U.S. House of Representatives from New York's 38th congressional district 1963–1968	Succeeded by James F. Hastings
Party political offices
New office	Chair of the House Republican Research Committee; 1965–1968	Succeeded by Robert Taft Jr.
Preceded by Kenneth Keating	Republican nominee for U.S. Senator from New York (Class 1); 1970	Succeeded by James L. Buckley
Preceded by Robert F. Kennedy	Liberal nominee for U.S. Senator from New York (Class 1); 1970	Succeeded by Daniel Patrick Moynihan
U.S. Senate
Preceded by Robert F. Kennedy	U.S. Senator (Class 1) from New York; 1968–1971; Served alongside: Jacob Javits	Succeeded by James L. Buckley
