= Environmental and Energy Study Institute =

US Climate Change organization

- Established: 1984
- Focus: Promoting sustainable solutions and informing policymakers about environmental and energy issues, including climate change.
- Website: www.eesi.org

The Environmental and Energy Study Institute (EESI) is an independent, bi-partisan 501(c)(3) non-profit organization that aims to promote environmentally sustainable societies. Based out of Washington, DC, EESI seeks to be a catalyst moving society away from environmentally damaging fossil fuels and toward a clean energy future. The organization was established in 1984 by a bipartisan and bicameral group of members of the United States Congress who were concerned with global environmental and energy problems.

EESI works to advance policy solutions that reduce greenhouse gas emissions and ground-level air pollution; improve public health, energy security, and economic development opportunities; and increase use of renewable energy and energy efficiency. The group seeks to advance its mission through policymaker education, coalition building, and policy development. Charity Navigator, an independent nonprofits evaluator, has rated EESI as a 4 out of 4 stars organization since October 1, 2015.

== Formation ==
EESI grew out of the Environmental Study Conference (ESC), a bipartisan caucus of Members of the House of Representatives launched in 1975 by Rep. Richard (Dick) Ottinger (D-NY) and Rep. Alan Steelman (R-TX). Its initial staff director/organizer James H. Rathlesberger (1975-76) was recruited from the office of Rep. Henry S. Reuss (D-WI), who was among the planners. Rathlesberger recruited a talented staff of five aided by outstanding interns. ESC’s Weekly Bulletin, “the Green Sheet,” was on Members’ desks before start of business Monday mornings, thanks to late Friday night hours by ESC’s staff and weekend production/distribution by intern Edward V. Kislik. Special alerts, fact sheets, and meetings for Members and Congressional staff supplemented the Green Sheet analyses of bills, hearings, and floor action. ESC grew to over 150 Members of the House in less than a year. Its heavily-attended Briefings for Congressional Staff included “Cancer and the Environment,” with expert speakers including Ralph Nader on January 12, 1976. This early impact aided Ottinger’s rise as a difference maker in the House.

The ESC became bicameral in 1976 expanding the pool of unused “clerk-hire” funds from which to request staff salaries. This put the ESC on better footing though somewhat diminished the focus of serving House Members who had fewer staff than Senators. In 1984 the leadership of the Study Conference launched an independent non-profit, the Environmental and Energy Study Institute (EESI) to continue the Conference's mission to provide information and policy resources to Congress on energy and environmental issues. EESI was established as a separate and distinct 501(c)(3) non-profit, overseen by an independent board of directors, which included several Members of Congress.

The founders of the Institute were: Anthony C. Beilenson (D-CA), George Brown, Jr. (D-CA), Bob Edgar (D-PA), Joseph L. Fisher (D-VA), S. William Green (R-NY), Gilbert Gude (R-MD), John Heinz (R-PA), James M. Jeffords (R-VT), Patrick Leahy (D-VT), Paul N. McCloskey, Jr. (R-CA), Richard L. Ottinger (D-NY), Claudine Schneider (R-RI), John F. Seiberling (D-OH), Vin Weber (R-MN), Howard Wolpe (D-MI), Louis Stokes (D-OH), Augustus Hawkins (D-CA), John Chafee (R-RI), Slade Gorton (R-WA), Gary Hart (D-CO)

== Areas of Work ==
Federal Policy

EESI supports policy changes and strategies that will allow the United States and other countries to mitigate climate change, while also reaping the environmental, economic, national security, and public health benefits of energy efficiency and renewable energy technologies. In practice, this means encouraging federal policymakers to enact legislation and policies promoting renewable energy, energy efficiency and the phasing out of harmful climate pollutants. EESI promotes policies that have bipartisan appeal in a wide range of areas, including buildings, climate change, communities, energy efficiency, industry, public health, renewable energy, rural issues, and transportation.

On-Bill Financing

In addition to its federal policy work, EESI launched a community-focused energy efficiency program in 2014, following several years of work on a pilot program in South Carolina (starting in 2010). The On-Bill Financing Project is an ongoing initiative aimed at helping families reduce energy use, cut energy bills, and improve home comfort through an innovative financing approach known as on-bill financing. Participating organizations provide their customers with loans for home energy upgrades, such as better insulation or more energy-efficient heating and cooling systems. These loans are then repaid through a monthly charge on the customer's utility bill. When the program is properly designed, the savings resulting from the energy efficiency upgrades outweigh the cost of the loan, and the customer saves money every month.

EESI's on-bill financing initiative has expanded into a national effort to significantly improve the energy efficiency of homes served by rural electric cooperatives and public power utilities. Because the approach involves no money down (and can be designed to be cash-flow positive), it can work for low-income families that are unable to take advantage of rebates or other efficiency incentives.

== Briefings and Publications ==
Briefings

EESI holds between 25 and 30 Congressional briefings every year to inform Congressional staffers, the federal policymaking community, and the public at large about energy and environmental issues.

These briefings bring experts from government, industry, and civil society to Capitol Hill for bipartisan discussions on cutting-edge research, success stories, lessons learned, and stakeholder feedback.

Briefing topics have included resilience, national security issues, water issues, energy efficiency, solar power, wind power, geothermal power, hydropower, fuel cells and hydrogen energy, biofuels and biomass, clean energy financing, deploying electric vehicles, mass transit, walkable cities, climate change impacts, short-lived climate pollutants, transmission and the power grid, district energy, and microgrids.

EESI briefings are free, held on Capitol Hill in Washington, D.C., and most are open to the public. In 2013, EESI began livestreaming most of its briefings.

Publications

EESI periodically publishes web articles, issue briefs, and fact sheets on environmental and energy issues and related legislation. Additionally, EESI distributes two weekly newsletters: "Climate Change News" (CCN), featuring the main climate-related science, business, and policy stories of the week; and "Sustainable Bioenergy, Farms, and Forests" (SBFF), focusing on policy developments in bioenergy and sustainable land use.

All EESI publications and newsletters are distributed free of charge.

== See also ==
- Environmental Defense Fund
