= 2015 Council of the District of Columbia special election =

US election

2015 Council of the District of Columbia special elections
- April 28, 2015

2 of the 13 seats in the Council of the District of Columbia 7 seats needed for a majority
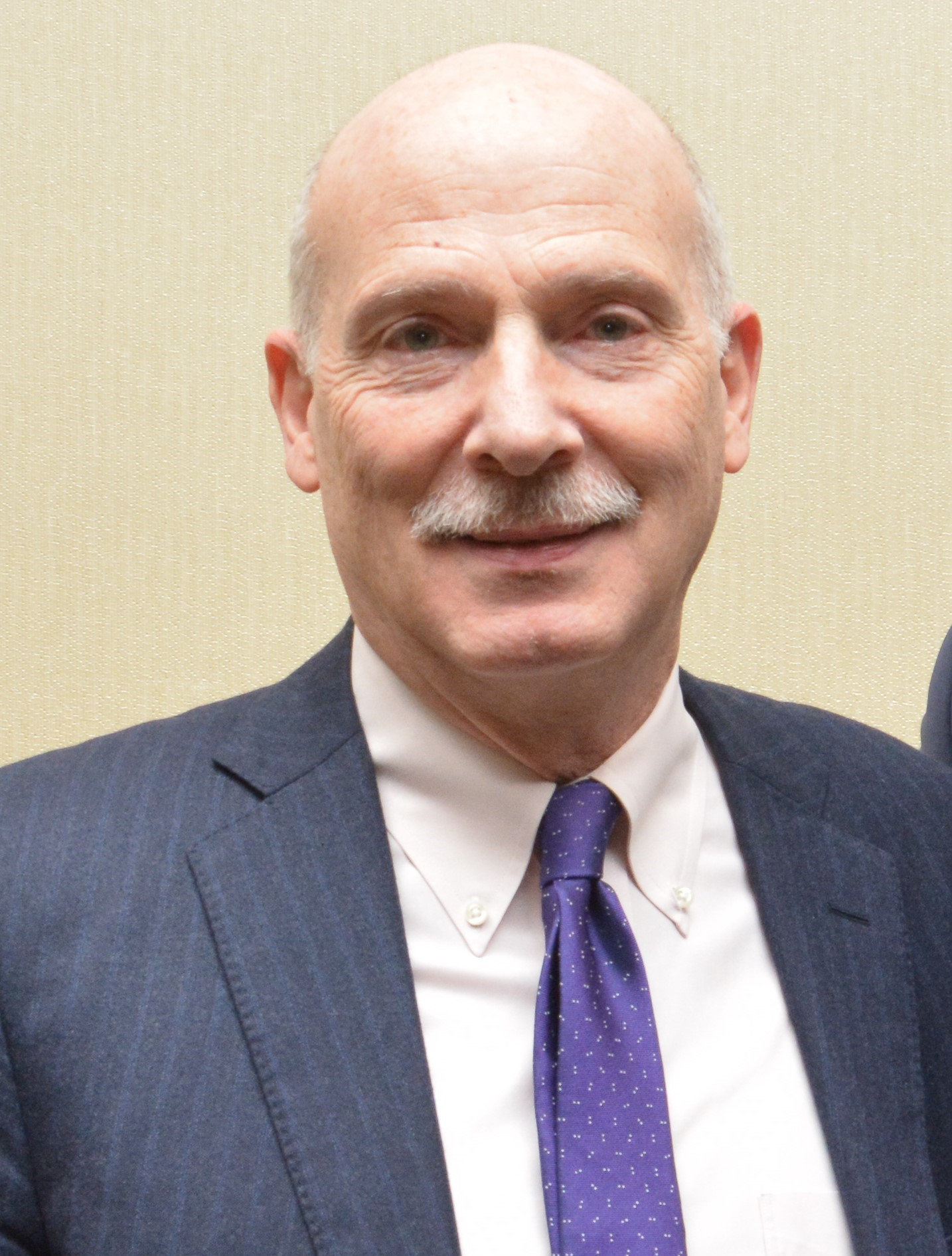

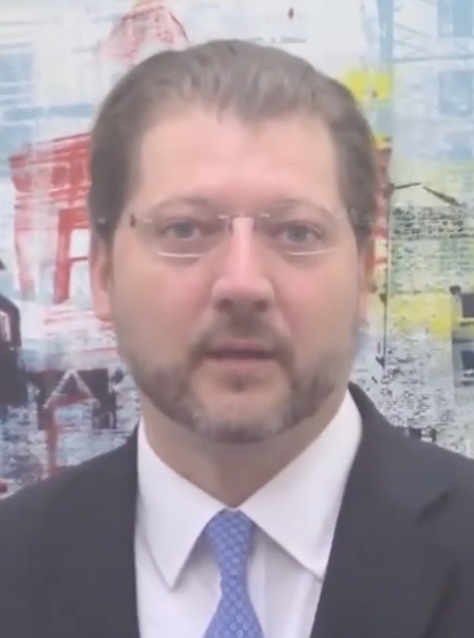
| | Majority party | Minority party |
|---|---|---|
| Leader | Phil Mendelson | David Grosso |
| Party | Democratic | Independent |
| Seats before | 11 | 2 |
| Seats after | 11 | 2 |
| Seat change | Steady | Steady |

The 2015 Council of the District of Columbia special election was held on April 28, 2015, to elect two members of the Council of the District of Columbia. The special elections were held to fill two vacancies on the Council. Voters in Wards 4 and 8 selected successors for newly-elected mayor Muriel Bowser and the late Marion Barry, respectively.

All candidates, regardless of party affiliation, appear on one ballot in the special election. The individual who receives a plurality of votes is the winning candidate. In both races, thirteen candidates mounted bids. Out of those 13 (in both races), only one candidate was a non-Democrat. Brandon Todd and LaRuby May, both Democrats and allies of mayor Muriel Bowser, were elected to fill the seats in Wards 4 and 8.

== Ward 4 ==
2015 Council of the District of Columbia Ward 4 special election
- April 28, 2015
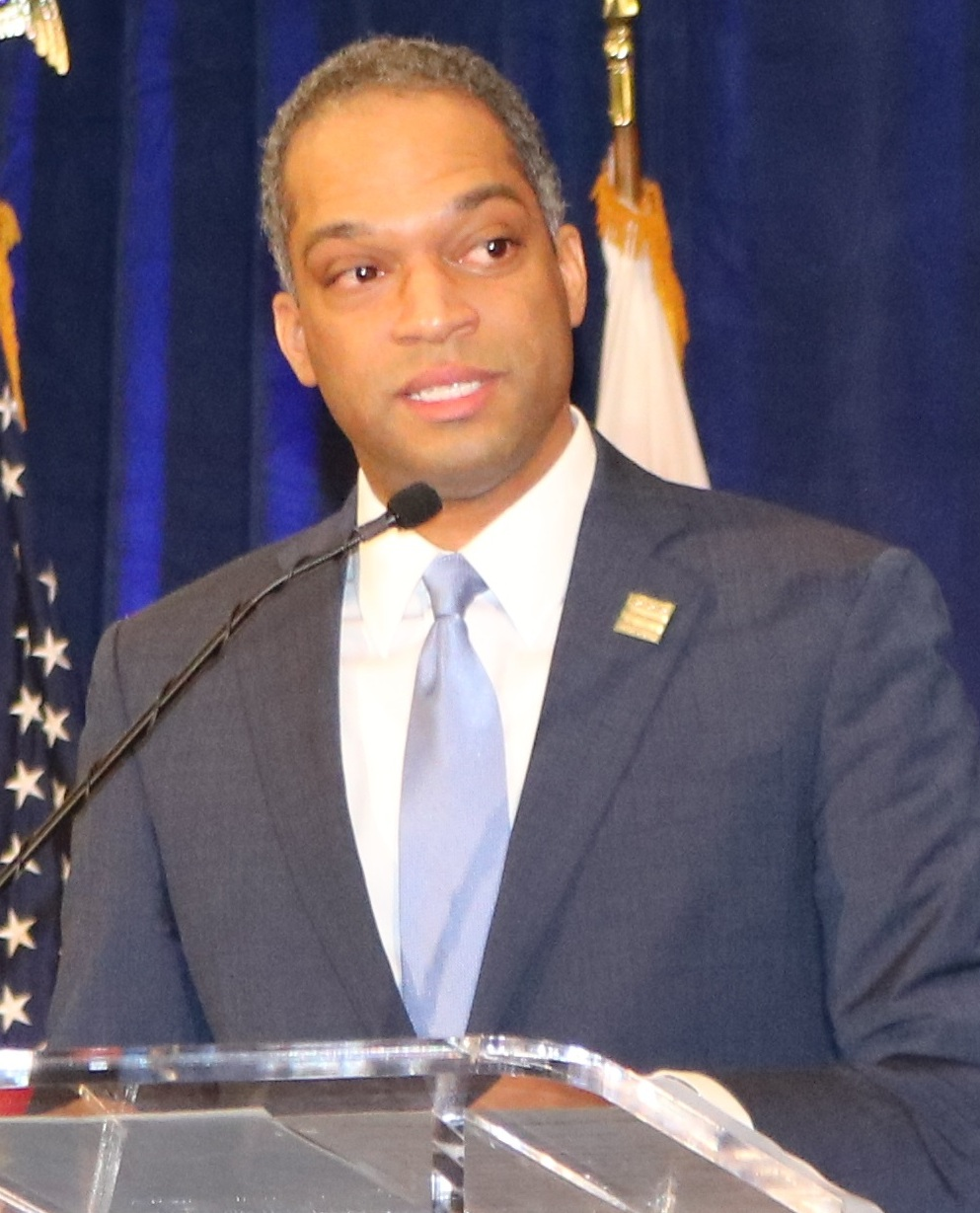

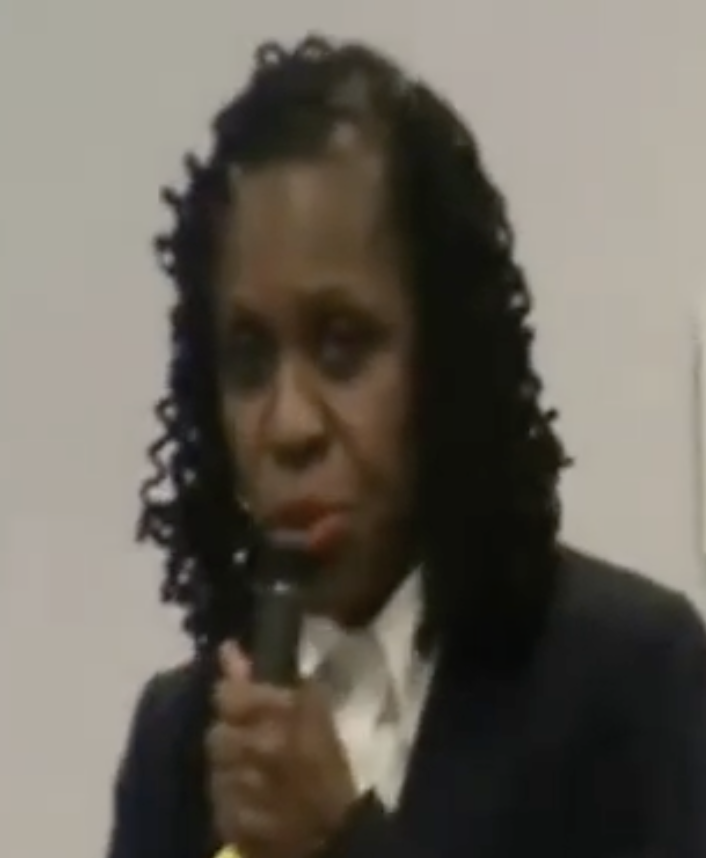

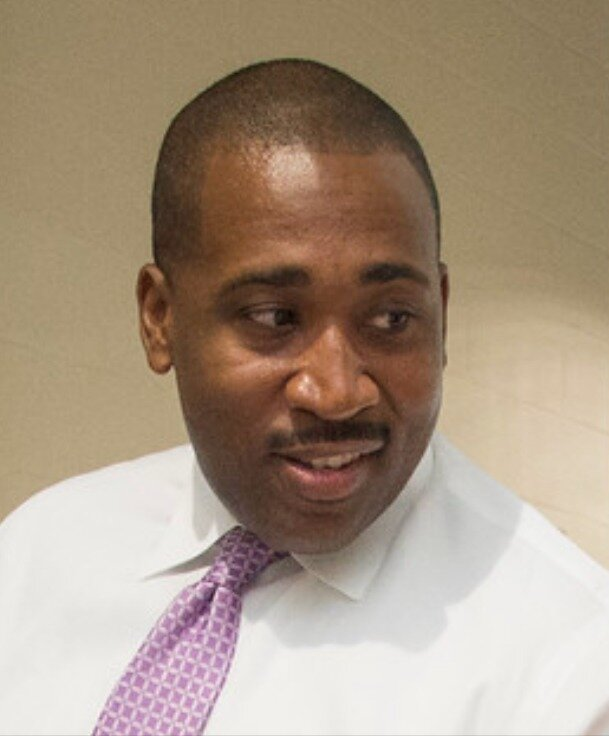

| Nominee | Brandon Todd | Renee Bowser | Leon Andrews |
| Party | Democratic | Democratic | Democratic |
| Popular vote | 4,584 | 2,311 | 1,613 |
| Percentage | 42.8% | 21.6% | 15.0% |
| Nominee | Dwayne Toliver | Ron Austin | Edwin Powell |
| Party | Democratic | Democratic | Democratic |
| Popular vote | 1,297 | 185 | 132 |
| Percentage | 12.1% | 1.7% | 1.2% |
Councilmember before election
vacant
Elected Councilmember
Brandon Todd
Democratic

Muriel Bowser was first elected to represent Ward 4 on the Council in a 2007 special election, and was reelected in 2008 and 2012. In 2014, she ran for mayor and won, challenging incumbent Vince Gray. She resigned from her councilmember position in January 2015, leaving the position vacant for roughly four months.

Brandon Todd, a protege of Bowser, emerged as the frontrunner in the race to replace his old boss. Touting his endorsement from Bowser, Todd raised a whopping $50,000 in the three days following his candidacy announcement. During the race, Todd advertised his close relationship with Bowser, arguing he was the only candidate who could pick up the phone and discuss the Ward's needs with the new mayor. Todd, however, did not exactly cruise to victory: his campaign had its share of stumbles. For example, when asked during a debate to name a historical figure he admired, Todd reportedly took to Google's search engine to help him answer the question. His campaign did not comment on the matter.

Todd was heavily favored not only because he was the handpicked successor of Bowser, but also because the "anti-Bowser vote" was split between multiple candidates. The progressive Renee Bowser, of no relation to the mayor, had challenged the now-mayor multiple times for the Ward 4 position on the Council, but to no avail. Leon Andrews, an urban planner, was seen as another chief opponent to Todd, the Bowser candidate. Dwayne Toliver, an attorney garnered the late endorsement of ex-mayor Vince Gray, the then-incumbent Bowser challenged and unseated in 2014. Doug Sloan, vice president of the Washington, D.C. NAACP branch and former chairman of ANC 4B, dropped out of the race to consolidate the anti-Todd and therefore anti-Bowser vote.

In the April special election, Todd garnered nearly 4,600 votes, topping his closest opponent, Renee Bowser, by nearly 2,300 votes.

=== Candidates ===
- Acqunetta Anderson (Democratic), ANC commissioner from 4A01
- Leon Andrews (Democratic), National League of Cities executive
- Ron Austin (Democratic), former chair of ANC 4B
- Renee Bowser (Democratic), UFCW staff attorney (no relation to mayor Muriel Bowser)
- Judi Jones, ANC commissioner from 4B07
- Edwin Powell (Democratic), Howard University professor and member of the D.C. Commission on Human Rights
- Glova Scott (Independent), Walmart employee and community activist
- Bobvala Tengen, government consultant
- Brandon Todd (Democratic), former constituent services director to councilmember Muriel Bowser
- Dwayne Toliver, real estate attorney

Did not qualify

- Bruce Morrison

Withdrawn

- A.J. Cooper, former TV host and Marine Corps veteran (deceased)
- Pedro Rubio Jr. (Democratic), federal contracting consultant
- Doug Sloan (Democratic), political strategist and vice president of the Washington, D.C. NAACP branch

Endorsements

Brandon Todd

Local officials

- Yvette Alexander, member the Council of the District of Columbia from Ward 7 (2007-2017)
- Muriel Bowser, mayor of the District of Columbia (2015-present) and former member of the Council of the District of Columbia from Ward 4 (2007-2015)
- Linda Cropp, former chair of the Council of the District of Columbia (1997-2007) and at-large councilmember (1991-1997)
- Charlene Drew Jarvis, former member of the Council of the District of Columbia from Ward 4 (1979-2001)
- Bill Lightfoot, former member of the Council of the District of Columbia from the at-large district (1989-1997)

Organizations

- Gertrude Stein Democratic Club
- Sierra Club

Publications

- The Washington Post
Dwayne Toliver

Local officials

- Vince Gray, former mayor of the District of Columbia (2011-2015)

=== General Election ===
2015 Council of the District of Columbia Ward 4 special election
| Party | Candidate | Votes | % |
|---|---|---|---|
| Democratic | Brandon Todd | 4,584 | 42.82% |
| Democratic | Renee Bowser | 2,311 | 21.59% |
| Democratic | Leon Andrews | 1,613 | 15.07% |
| Democratic | Dwayne Toliver | 1,297 | 12.11% |
| Democratic | Ron Austin | 185 | 1.73% |
| Democratic | Edwin Powell | 132 | 1.23% |
| Democratic | Judi Jones | 119 | 1.11% |
| Democratic | Acqunetta Anderson | 117 | 1.09% |
| Democratic | Bobvala Tengen | 91 | 0.85% |
| Democratic | Gwenellen Corley-Bowman | 73 | 0.69% |
| Democratic | Douglass Sloan (withdrawn) | 55 | 0.51% |
| Independent | Glova Scott | 53 | 0.50% |
| Democratic | Pedro Rubio Jr. (withdrawn) | 37 | 0.35% |
| Write-in | | 38 | 0.35% |
| Total votes | | 10,706 | 100% |

== Ward 8 ==
2015 Council of the District of Columbia Ward 8 special election
- April 28, 2015

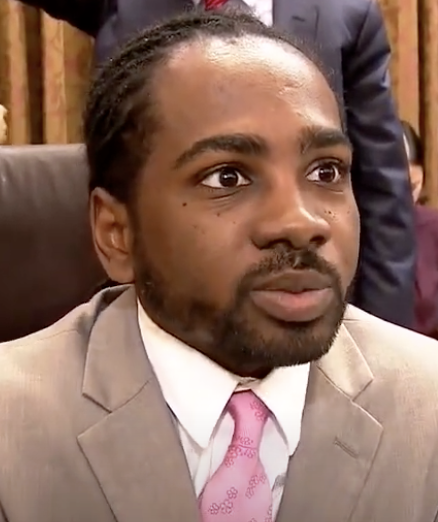

| Nominee | LaRuby May | Trayon White | Sheila Bunn |
| Party | Democratic | Democratic | Democratic |
| Popular vote | 1,955 | 1,877 | 741 |
| Percentage | 26.9% | 26.0% | 10.1% |
| Nominee | Eugene Kinlow | Natalie Williams | Marion C. Barry |
| Party | Democratic | Democratic | Democratic |
| Popular vote | 693 | 683 | 554 |
| Percentage | 9.5% | 9.4% | 7.6% |
Councilmember before election
vacant
Elected Councilmember
LaRuby May
Democratic

Marion Barry, a renowned former mayor-turned-councilmember died in office on November 23, 2014. Barry's death, a legendary politico from Ward 8, created a power vacuum in the long-underserved council district, the only at the time to be entirely east of the Anacostia River.

According to The Washington Post, former Ward 8 representative on the D.C. State Board of Education Trayon White, was one of the many candidates considering a bid to replace Barry. In fact, the Post reported Barry called White in the hours between his release from Howard University Hospital and his death, urging the young activist and community leader to pick up Barry's mantle. Initially, White lagged in fundraising and struggled to compete financially with his fellow candidates. Regardless, the Washington City Paper reported that White was a likely leading candidate in the race, resembling the "youthful agitator" that once was Marion Barry.

Upon the senior Barry's death, Christopher Barry, announced his bid to succeed his late father on the Council. The Washington Post considered the junior Barry to be an early frontrunner in the race. Barry appeared on the ballot as Marion C. Barry. According to the City Paper, the senior Barry had originally planned to resign from his seat and help his son, Christopher, ascend to the Council. Barry died, however, and was unable to help his son, especially as his special election campaign crumbled and faltered due to fundraising issues and then-pending criminal charges for breaking a security camera at a bank. Despite his ever-helpful name, Marion. C Barry notched only 554 votes in the election, earning sixth place.

Other candidates included United Medical Center spokeswoman and estranged Barry staffer Natalie Williams, federal affairs lobbyist Eugene Kinlow, and former ANC 8E chair Sandra Seegars.

White's strongest competitor, LaRuby May, was the most robust fundraiser of the pack. By March, she raised roughly $227,000 more in funds than White, and received the endorsement of her former boss mayor Muriel Bowser. May's gargantuan fundraising advantage, however, only barely pulled her over the finish line. Preliminary results showed May with a slight, 152 vote lead over White. As the final votes were counted, that margin slimmed down to a mere 78 votes. White initially asked for a recount, though later asked the Board of Elections to suspend the recount. White instead pursued the seat in the 2016 Council election.

=== Candidates ===
- Marion C. Barry (Democratic), construction company executive and son of the late former mayor and councilmember Marion Barry
- Sheila Bunn (Democratic), former chief of staff to Rep. Eleanor Holmes Norton
- Greta Fuller (Democratic), engineer and ANC commissioner from 8A06
- Eugene Kinlow (Democratic), federal affairs lobbyist
- LaRuby May (Democratic), District of Columbia Housing Authority commissioner and former Muriel Bowser campaign staffer
- Anthony Muhammad (Democratic), former ANC commissioner
- Sandra Seegars (Democratic), former ANC 8E chair
- Keita Vanterpool (Independent), chiropractor
- Leonard Watson Sr. (Democratic), former outreach staffer for former mayor Vince Gray'* Trayon White, former member of the District of Columbia State Board of Education from Ward 8 (2011-2014)
- Natalie Williams (Democratic), United Medical Center spokesperson and former staffer to Marion Barry

Withdrawn

- Jauhar Abraham (Democratic), community activist (endorsed White)
- Stuart Anderson (Democratic), non-profit executive (endorsed White)

Endorsements

Marion C. Barry

Local officials

- Jim Graham, former member of the Council of the District of Columbia from Ward 1 (1999-2015)
Sheila Bunn

Local officials

- Vince Gray, former mayor of the District of Columbia (1999-2015)
Eugene Kinlow

Organizations

- Sierra Club
LaRuby May

Labor unions

- AFL-CIO Metropolitan Washington Council
- SEIU

Local officials

- Muriel Bowser, mayor of the District of Columbia (2015-present)
- Brianne Nadeau, member of the Council of the District of Columbia from Ward 1 (2015-present)
- Sandy Allen, former member of the Council of the District of Columbia from Ward 8 (1997-2005)
- Eydie Whittington, former member of the Council of the District of Columbia from Ward 8 (1995-1997)
- Arrington Dixon, former chairman of the Council of the District of Columbia (1979-1983)

Organizations

- DC National Organization for Women
- Gertrude Stein Democratic Club
- National Nurses United

Publications

- The Washington Post
Trayon White

Individuals

- Jauhar Abraham, community activist and former candidate for this seat
- Stuart Anderson, non-profit executive and former candidate for this seat

Local officials

- Karl Racine, attorney general of the District of Columbia (2015-2023)
- Nate Fleming, former shadow representative from the District of Columbia (2013-2015)

Organizations

- Jews United for Justice
- Washington Teachers' Union

=== General Election ===
2015 Council of the District of Columbia Ward 8 special election
| Party | Candidate | Votes | % |
|---|---|---|---|
| Democratic | LaRuby May | 1,955 | 26.9% |
| Democratic | Trayon White | 1,877 | 25.8% |
| Democratic | Sheila Bunn | 741 | 10.1% |
| Democratic | Eugene Kinlow | 693 | 9.5% |
| Democratic | Natalie Williams | 683 | 9.4% |
| Democratic | Marion C. Barry | 554 | 7.6% |
| Democratic | Sandra Seegars | 331 | 4.6% |
| Democratic | Anthony Muhammad | 123 | 1.7% |
| Democratic | Leonard Watson Sr. | 123 | 1.7% |
| Democratic | Greta Fuller | 100 | 1.4% |
| Independent | Keita Vanderpool | 46 | 0.6% |
| Write-in | | 23 | 0.3% |
| Democratic | Jauhar Abraham (withdrawn) | 17 | 0.2% |
| Democratic | Stuart Anderson (withdrawn) | 10 | 0.1% |
| Total votes | | 7,276 | 100.00% |
