= 2016 Council of the District of Columbia election =

US election

- November 8, 2016

5 seats on the Council of the District of Columbia 7 seats needed for a majority
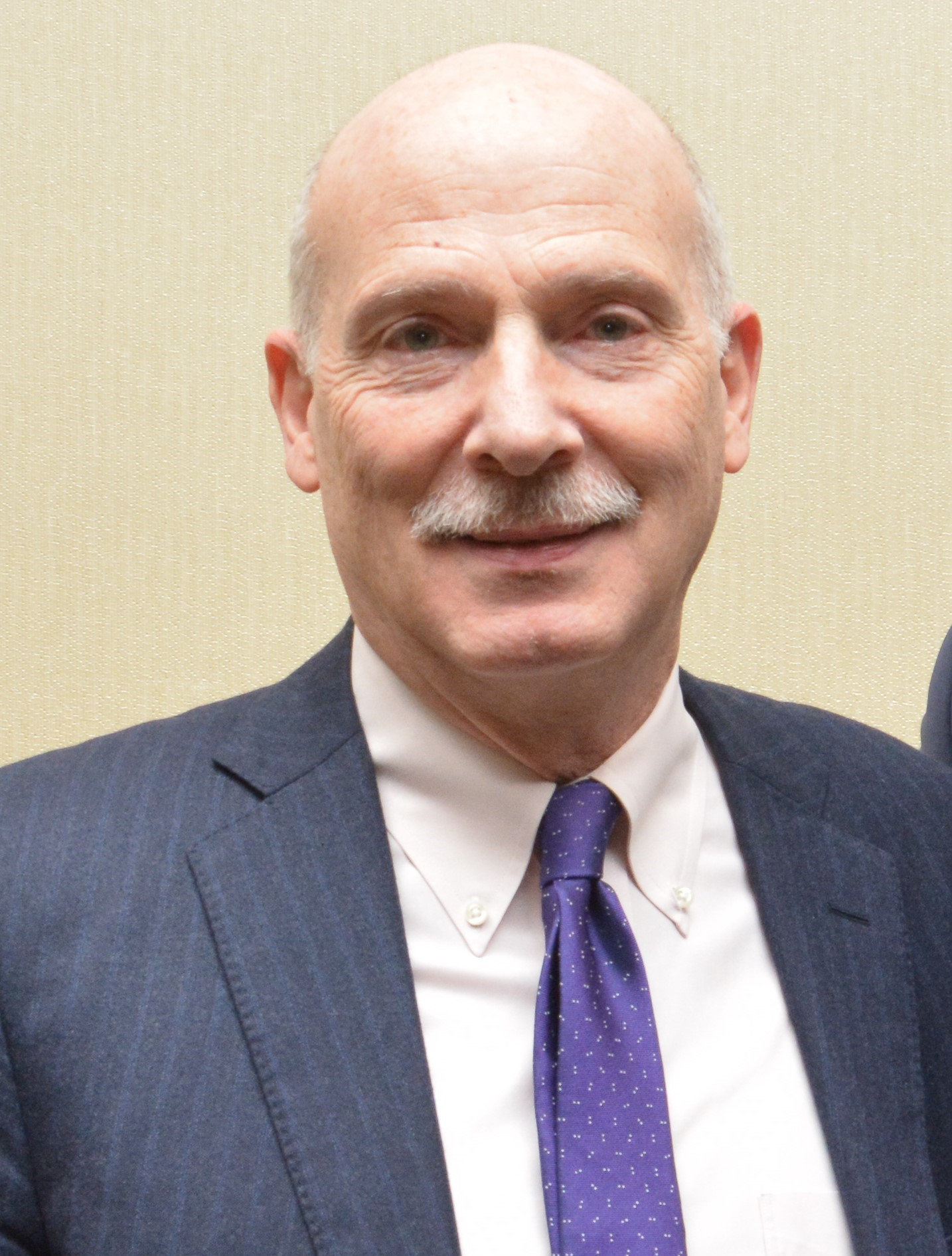

	Majority party	Minority party
Leader	Phil Mendelson
Party	Democratic	Independent
Seats before	11	2
Seats after	11	2
Seat change	Steady	Steady
Chair of the Council before election
Phil Mendelson
Democratic
Elected Chair of the Council
Phil Mendelson
Democratic

The 2016 Council of the District of Columbia general election was held on November 8, with the primary election occurring on June 14. Elections were held for the seats of four out of the eight wards and two of the four at-large seats. The Democratic Party retained its control of the Council.Former mayor Vince Gray, Trayon White, and Robert White all unseated incumbent councilmembers in Wards 7, 8, and at-large seat respectively. Brandon Todd won his first full term representing Ward 4 and Jack Evans was reelected to his Ward 2 seat without any opposition.

== Background ==
The District of Columbia Home Rule Act states that "not more than two of the at-large members shall be nominated by the same political party", which results in the Democratic Party being unable to run in all at-large districts. David Catania, a member of the city council from 1997 to 2015, was the last member of the Republican Party elected to the council, but changed his political affiliation to independent in 2004.

== At-large ==
2016 Council of the District of Columbia At-Large Election
- November 8, 2016
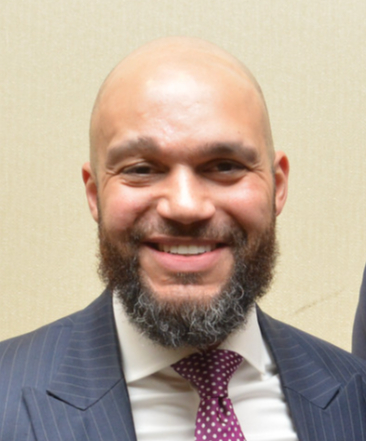

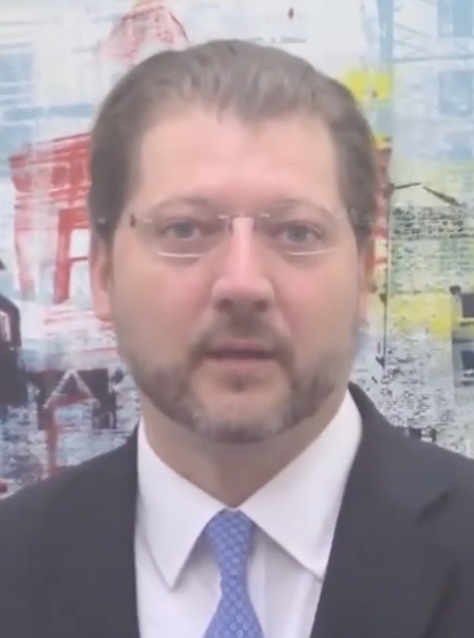

	Majority party	Minority party	Third party
Candidate	Robert White	David Grosso	G. Lee Aikin
Party	Democratic	Independent	DC Statehood Green
Popular vote	233,983	108,745	29,165
Percentage	52.80%	24.54%	6.58%
	Fourth party	Fifth party	Sixth party
Candidate	Carolina Celnik	John Cheeks	Matthew Klokel
Party	Republican	Independent	Libertarian
Popular vote	28,823	24,714	14,178
Percentage	6.50%	5.58%	3.20%
At-large councilmember before election
Robert White (D)
David Grosso (I)
Elected At-large councilmember
Robert White (D)
David Grosso (I)

Incumbent at-large councilmember Vincent Orange, a public official known for campaign rallies with free oranges and his eccentric policy ideas, was challenged to the left by former congressional aide Robert White and former advisory neighborhood commissioner David Garber. Both White and Garber portrayed Orange as a corrupt, ethically challenged politician who had served for too long on the Council. In the June primary, White narrowly bested the incumbent Orange by two percentage points with Garber claiming a distant third place. Upon losing the primary, Orange accepted a position as president of the D.C. Chamber of Commerce, raising yet another ethics concern. Orange eventually resigned from his position on the Council in August. The DC Democratic Party selected White to fill out Orange's term.

=== Democratic primary ===
Candidates

- Robert White, former director of community affairs for Attorney General Karl Racine, legislative counsel to Rep. Eleanor Holmes Norton, and independent candidate for at-large in 2014
- Vincent Orange, incumbent at-large councilmember (2011-present) and former councilmember from Ward 5 (1999-2007)
- David Garber, former ANC commissioner

Declined

- Vince Gray, former mayor of the District of Columbia (2011-2015) (running for Ward 7 councilmember)

Endorsements

Vincent Orange

Local officials

- Muriel Bowser, mayor of the District of Columbia (2015–present)
- Jack Evans, member of the Council of the District of Columbia from Ward 2 (1991-present)

Newspapers

- The Washington Post
Robert White

Local officials

- Vince Gray, former mayor of the District of Columbia (2011–2015)
- Mary Cheh, member of the Council of the District of Columbia from Ward 3 (2007-2023)
- Karl Racine, Attorney General of the District of Columbia (2015-2023)
- Trayon White, former member of the District of Columbia State Board of Education from Ward 8 (2011-2014) and candidate for Ward 8 councilmember in 2015 and 2016

Organizations

- Gay and Lesbian Activists Alliance
- Sierra Club
- DC for Democracy

2016 Council of the District of Columbia At-large Democratic primary
Party	Candidate	Votes	%
Democratic	Robert White	38,805	42.72%
Democratic	Vincent Orange	37,009	40.74%
Democratic	David Garber	14,237	15.67%
Write-in		787	0.87%
Total votes		90,838	100%

=== Republican Primary ===
Candidates

- Carolina Celnik

2016 Council of the District of Columbia At-large Republican primary
Party	Candidate	Votes	%
Republican	Carolina Celnik	1,270	89.69%
Write-in		146	10.31%
Total votes		1,416	100%

=== Statehood Green Primary ===
Candidates

- G. Lee Aikin

2016 Council of the District of Columbia At-large Statehood Green primary
Party	Candidate	Votes	%
DC Statehood Green	G. Lee Aikin	280	68.97%
Write-in		126	31.03%
Total votes		406	100%

=== Independents ===
Candidates

- John Cheeks, reparations activist
- David Grosso, incumbent at-large councilmember (2013-present)

=== General Election ===
2016 Council of the District of Columbia At-large general election
Party	Candidate	Votes	%
Democratic	Robert White	233,983	52.80%
Independent	David Grosso	108,745	24.54%
DC Statehood Green	G. Lee Aikin	29,165	6.58%
Republican	Carolina Celnik	28,823	6.50%
Independent	John C. Cheeks	24,714	5.58%
Libertarian	Matthew Klokel	14,178	3.20%
Write-in		3,536	0.80%
Total votes		443,144	100%

== Ward 2 ==
2016 Council of the District of Columbia Ward 2 Election
- November 8, 2016
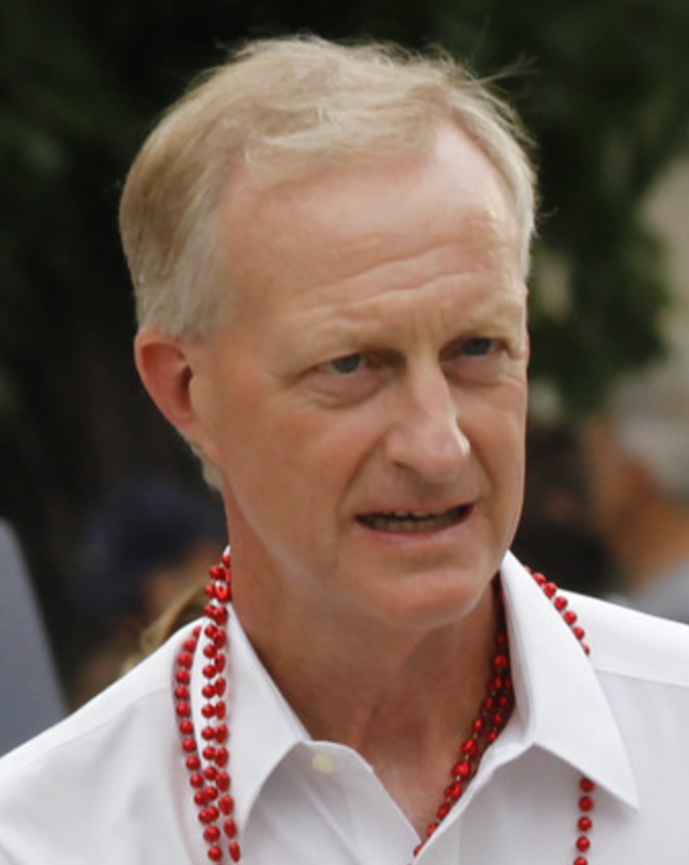
	Majority party
Candidate	Jack Evans
Party	Democratic
Popular vote	27,534
Percentage	96.58%
Ward 2 councilmember before election
Jack Evans
Democratic
Elected Ward 2 councilmember
Jack Evans
Democratic

Incumbent councilmember Jack Evans won his seventh full term to the Council. He was unopposed in both the primary and general election. Evans had previously made his third bid for mayor in 2014. Evans eventually resigned from the Council in 2020 in order to prevent a likely expulsion amid an ethics scandal.

=== Democratic primary ===
Candidates

- Jack Evans, incumbent councilmember (1991-present)

2016 Council of the District of Columbia Ward 2 Democratic primary
Party	Candidate	Votes	%
Democratic	Jack Evans	7,626	95.37%
Write-in		370	4.63%
Total votes		7,996	100%

=== Independents ===
Withdrawn

- Bruce Majors, real estate agent

=== General Election ===
2016 Council of the District of Columbia Ward 2 general election
Party	Candidate	Votes	%
Democratic	Jack Evans	27,534	96.58%
Write-in		975	4.63%
Total votes		28,509	100%

== Ward 4 ==
2016 Council of the District of Columbia Ward 4 Election
- November 8, 2016
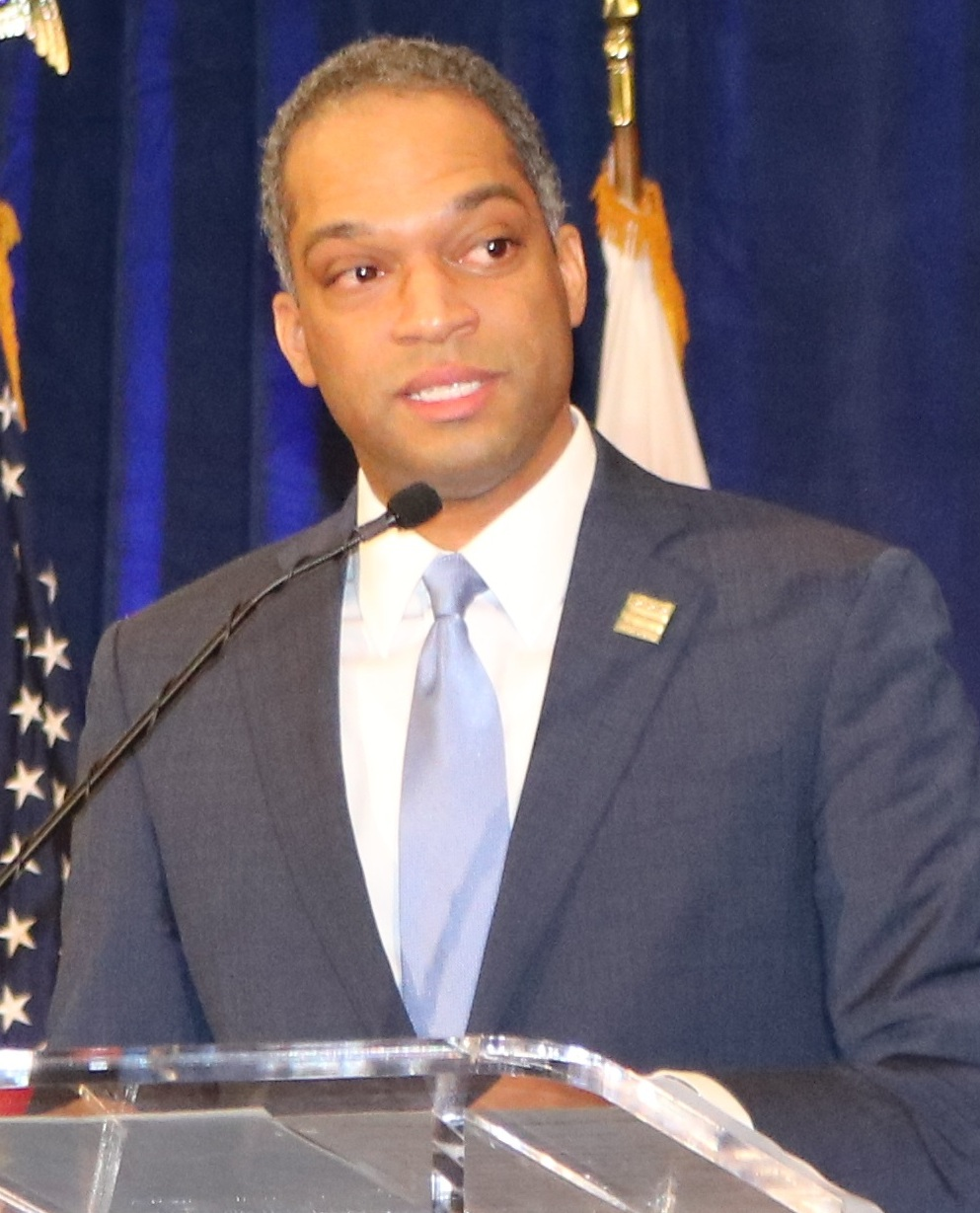
	Majority party
Candidate	Brandon Todd
Party	Democratic
Popular vote	35,100
Percentage	95.09%
Ward 4 councilmember before election
Brandon Todd
Democratic
Elected Ward 4 councilmember
Brandon Todd
Democratic

Brandon Todd secured his first full term on the Council. A former staffer to mayor Muriel Bowser, Todd was the only Bowser ally in 2016 to survive reelection. Todd previously won a special election to fill out Bowser's term as the Ward 4 councilmember in 2015. The handpicked successor of Bowser, Todd faced a spirited challenge from urban planner Leon Andrews in the Democratic primary; although Andrews characterized Todd as an ineffective legislator, he eventually came eight percentage points short. Todd secured reelection in the November general election with no opposition. Four years later, in 2020, Todd was defeated for reelection by Janeese Lewis George.

=== Democratic primary ===
Candidates

- Leon Andrews, National League of Cities executive and candidate for Ward 4 councilmember in the 2015 special election
- Ron Austin, chair of ANC 4B and former constituent services director for then-councilmember Adrian Fenty
- Calvin Gurley, accountant and perennial candidate
- Brandon Todd, incumbent councilmember (2015-present)

Endorsements

Brandon Todd

Local officials

- Muriel Bowser, mayor of the District of Columbia (2015-present)

Organizations

- Democrats for Education Reform

Newspapers

- The Washington Post
Leon Andrews

Organizations

- Jews United for Justice
- DC Latino Caucus
- DC for Democracy
- District of Columbia Nurses Association

2016 Council of the District of Columbia Ward 4 Democratic primary
Party	Candidate	Votes	%
Democratic	Brandon Todd	8,145	50.81%
Democratic	Leon Andrews	6,738	42.04%
Democratic	Ron Austin	574	3.58%
Democratic	Calvin Gurley	509	3.18%
Write-in		63	0.39%
Total votes		16,029	100%

=== General Election ===
2016 Council of the District of Columbia Ward 4 general election
Party	Candidate	Votes	%
Democratic	Brandon Todd	35,100	95.09%
Write-in		1,813	4.91%
Total votes		36,913	100%

== Ward 7 ==
2016 Council of the District of Columbia Ward 7 Election
- November 8, 2016
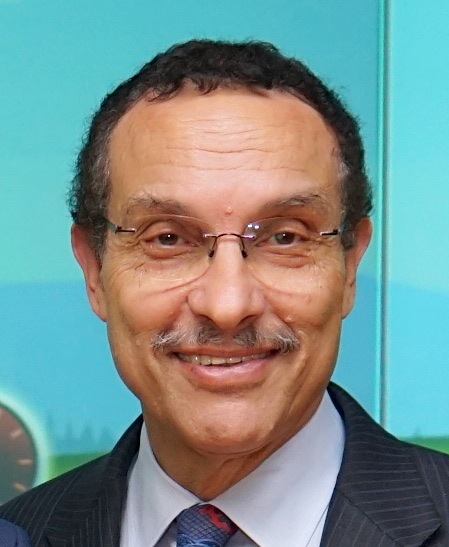

	Majority party	Minority party	Third party
Candidate	Vince Gray	Gary Butler	Christian Carter
Party	Democratic	Independent	Independent
Popular vote	27,956	2,367	1,837
Percentage	86.29%	7.31%	5.67%
Ward 7 councilmember before election
Yvette Alexander
Democratic
Elected Ward 7 councilmember
Vince Gray
Democratic

Vince Gray, fresh off losing his mayoral reelection bid to Muriel Bowser in 2014, mounted a comeback bid in his native Ward 7. He challenged incumbent councilmember Yvette Alexander for his old seat on the Council. Ironically, in 2006, when Gray abandoned his Ward 7 councilmember post and ran for Chair of the Council, the now-ex-mayor endorsed Alexander as his successor. Gray claimed he was moved to run for the Ward 7 seat again and challenge Alexander after "wide dissatisfaction" with her leadership.

Gray bested Alexander and two other opponents in a landslide win in the June primary. In the November general election, he handily defeated two independents to reclaim his seat on the Council.

=== Democratic primary ===
Candidates

- Yvette Alexander, incumbent councilmember (2007-present)
- Delmar Chesley, former NFL linebacker
- Vince Gray, former mayor of the District of Columbia (2011-2015), chairman of the Council of the District of Columbia (2007-2011), and member of the Council from Ward 7 (2005-2007)
- Grant Thompson, pastor and former congressional staffer

Withdrawn

- Ed Potillo, vice chairman of the D.C. Democratic Party

Endorsements

Yvette Alexander

Local officials

- Muriel Bowser, mayor of the District of Columbia (2015-present)

Newspapers

- The Washington Post
Vince Gray

Labor unions

- LiUNA
- National Building Trades Council
- United Food and Commercial Workers

Organizations

- DC for Democracy
- Democrats for Education Reform
- Gertrude Stein Democratic Club

2016 Council of the District of Columbia Ward 7 Democratic primary
Party	Candidate	Votes	%
Democratic	Vince Gray	6,333	60.73%
Democratic	Yvette Alexander	3,482	33.39%
Democratic	Grant Thompson	345	3.31%
Democratic	Delmar Chesley	208	1.99%
Write-in		60	0.58%
Total votes		10,368	100%

Independents

- Gary Butler, former ANC commissioner from 7B03
- Christian Carter, businessman

=== General Election ===
2016 Council of the District of Columbia Ward 7 general election
Party	Candidate	Votes	%
Democratic	Vince Gray	27,956	86.29%
Independent	Gary Butler	2,367	7.31%
Independent	Christian Carter	1,837	5.67%
Write-in		237	0.58%
Total votes		32,397	100%

== Ward 8 ==
2016 Council of the District of Columbia Ward 8 Election
- November 8, 2016
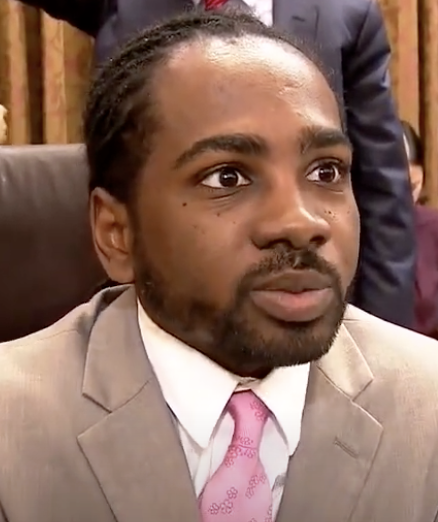
	Majority party
Candidate	Trayon White
Party	Democratic
Popular vote	27,174
Percentage	98.20%
Ward 8 councilmember before election
LaRuby May
Democratic
Elected Ward 8 councilmember
Trayon White
Democratic

In the 2015 special election, LaRuby May narrowly bested a field of 12 fellow candidates in the race to replace the late Marion Barry as Ward 8's councilmember. May, a former staffer to now-mayor Muriel Bowser and DC Housing Authority commissioner, edged out a 79-vote victory over Trayon White, an activist and former member of the District of Columbia State Board of Education. In 2016, White sought a rematch in a much-smaller field. White received the endorsement of numerous left-leaning groups; May was supported by the incumbent mayor Bowser.

In the June primary, White upset May by roughly 700 votes. He ran unopposed in the November general election.

=== Democratic primary ===
Candidates

- Maurice Dickens, community activist
- Bonita Goode, teacher
- Aaron Holmes, communications professional
- LaRuby May, incumbent councilmember
- Trayon White, former member of the District of Columbia State Board of Education from Ward 8 and candidate for Ward 8 councilmember in 2015

Endorsements

LaRuby May

Local officials

- Muriel Bowser, mayor of the District of Columbia (2015-present)

Organizations

- Democrats for Education Reform
- Gertrude Stein Democratic Club

Newspapers

- The Washington Post
Trayon White

Local officials

- Karl Racine, Attorney General of the District of Columbia (2015-2023)
- Vince Gray, former mayor of the District of Columbia (2011-2015) and candidate for Council in 2016

Organizations

- DC for Democracy

2016 Council of the District of Columbia Ward 8 Democratic primary
Party	Candidate	Votes	%
Democratic	Trayon White	4,272	51.40%
Democratic	LaRuby May	3,584	43.12%
Democratic	Aaron Holmes	280	3.37%
Democratic	Bonita Goode	75	0.9%
Democratic	Maurice Dickens	70	0.84%
Write-in		30	0.36%
Total votes		8,311	100%

=== General Election ===
2016 Council of the District of Columbia Ward 8 general election
Party	Candidate	Votes	%
Democratic	Trayon White	27,174	98.20%
Write-in		497	1.80%
Total votes		27,671	100%
