= LaRuby May =

American politician and lawyer (born 1975)

Member of the Council of the District of Columbia from Ward 8
- In office May 14, 2015 – January 2, 2017
- Preceded by: Marion Barry
- Succeeded by: Trayon White

Personal details
- Born: LaRuby Zinea May; December 28, 1975 (age 50) Pensacola, Florida, U.S.
- Party: Democratic
- Education: Eckerd College (BA); George Washington University (MA); University of the District of Columbia (JD)

LaRuby Zinea May (born December 28, 1975) is an American politician and African American lawyer who formerly represented Ward 8 on the Council of the District of Columbia in Washington, D.C. She won the Ward 8 special election on May 10, 2015, succeeding Marion Barry, who died in office on November 23, 2014. May, who was sworn into office on May 14, 2015, served out the remainder of Barry's term, which ended on December 31, 2016. During her first council term, she was active on the issues of crime and violence, marijuana policy, assisted suicide, and improvements to Advisory Neighborhood Commissions. She criticized the city's emergency medical services department, opposed the creation of a public electrical utility, and applauded the construction of a sports arena in her ward. She was one of the few council members to support the mayor during the FreshPAC scandal, and although she asked Congress to end its school voucher program she also supported a political action committee which supports an expanded voucher and charter school program in the District. She is a member of the Democratic Party.

She announced in January 2016 that she would campaign for election to a full, four-year term on the district council. She lost the June 2016 Democratic Party primary nomination election to Trayon White. As of 2018, she is chairperson of United Medical Center.

== Life and career ==
=== Early life and education ===
LaRuby May was born about 1975 in Pensacola, Florida, to Reverend Theophalis May and his wife, Mary. Her father owned a building firm, May's Construction Company, and was widely known in Pensacola for saving and restoring historic buildings. He was also pastor of Friendship Missionary Baptist Church.

May received a Bachelor of Arts degree in human development and family studies from Eckerd College in St. Petersburg, Florida, in 1997. She then enrolled at George Washington University in Washington, D.C., where she received a master's degree in community counseling and psychotherapy. She obtained her JD degree in 2006 from the David A. Clarke School of Law at the University of the District of Columbia. She was admitted to the District of Columbia Bar and The Florida Bar.

=== Early career work ===
May moved to Ward 8 in 2002. While in law school, May took a position as the executive director of the Gift Family Resource Center, a program of Garden Memorial Presbyterian Church which provided after-school and summer educational and enrichment programs for children in elementary and middle school. She left the position in 2003. In 2005 and 2006, May served as a legislative intern and then as Director of Constituent Services in D.C. Council member Marion Barry's office.

May joined Vision of Victory Community Development Corporation in 2007. May served as a project consultant for the nonprofit, which taught workplace skills to at-risk teens and young adults and engaged in low-income housing development. Councilmember Marion Barry helped the program win funding from the District of Columbia Department of Employment Services. May was appointed executive director of the program in May 2008. She continued to hold the position even as she served on the Board of Commissioners of the District of Columbia Housing Authority, and was serving in the position at the time of her D.C. District Council special election.

May was appointed to the Board of Commissioners of the District of Columbia Housing Authority in April 2009 after being nominated by Council Member Marion Barry. Her appointment was confirmed by the D.C. District Council on April 30, 2009. In November of the year, D.C. Mayor Adrian Fenty fired Bill Slover, chair of the Board of Commissioners, and replaced him with May. Mayor Fenty had transferred millions of dollars in capital funds from the District of Columbia Department of Parks and Recreation to the housing authority, and ordered the housing authority to build several new city parks and recreation centers. Contracts for the new parks were awarded to Banneker Ventures, a firm owned by a friend of Mayor Fenty's. May not only continued to implement the parks construction scheme, she added another $50 million to the effort from housing authority funds. As May's term as board chairperson neared completion on July 12, 2010, May took over as head of the search committee seeking a new chairperson. She then replaced existing search committee member Ken Grossinger (who represented the Metropolitan Washington AFL-CIO) with Valerie Santos, Fenty's deputy mayor for planning and economic development. According to The Washington Post, this upset Fenty opponents, who saw it as yet another example of a power-grab by the mayor.

May's work on the Board of Commissioners of the D.C. Housing Authority left her closely associated with Fenty.

At some point in her career, May also worked for Capitol Services Management, a firm which provided management services to D.C. public housing buildings.

=== Relationship with Muriel Bowser ===
In 2012, May co-founded the Community College Preparatory Academy, the first adult charter school in Ward 8, and served as the founding chairperson of its board of trustees.

That same year, May joined the election campaign of Muriel Bowser, a Fenty protégé who was running for a seat on the District Council from Ward 4. May had first met Bowser in 2010, when they both worked on Fenty's unsuccessful campaign to win renomination as the D.C. Democratic Party's candidate for mayor. May and Bowser's relationship continued over the next three years. In January 2013, May spotted Bowser at an awards ceremony in the Congress Heights neighborhood, and offered her support. When Vision of Victory opened Roundtree Residences, a 91-unit affordable-housing community, May invited Bowser to attend to give the mayoral candidate more visibility in Ward 8. May quickly became part of a very tight inner circle of Bowser supporters. Bowser named May her Ward 8 field coordinator when Bowser ran for the Democratic Party's mayoral nomination in 2013. According to The Washington Post, May pledged to help Bowser win the Ward 8 Democratic Party straw poll. Bowser upset then-incumbent D.C. Mayor Vincent C. Gray. Gray's loss in the straw poll was a turning point in the Democratic nomination, Bowser defeated Gray in the Democratic primary on April 1, 2014, then easily won the mayoralty in the general election in November 2014.

Bowser named May to the Economic Development and Jobs Committee of her mayoral transition team.

== 2015 D.C. Council special election ==
Ward 8 Council Member Marion Barry died in office on November 23, 2014. Two weeks later, May filed to run for Barry's council seat in the 2015 special election. At the time, the leading candidate to replace Barry, The Washington Post said, was Marion Christopher Barry, the late council member's 34-year-old son. Brianne Nadeau, Ward 1 Council Member, was one of May's earliest supporters, publicly endorsing her in late January and fundraising for her.

By February 3, 2015, 14 other candidates had joined May in the crowded Ward 8 special election. May proved to be a fund-raising powerhouse, however. By January 30, she had raised $177,405 and had spent almost nothing. Her closest competitor was Sheila Bunn, who had raised $51,692 by the same date. Far back in the pack was Trayon White, a former D.C. Board of Education member who had raised a mere $2,562. The Washington Post asserted that May's fund-raising advantage was critical in raising her name awareness in Ward 8, where she was little known, and allowing her to stand out in the crowded election field. Most of May's 535 contributors were corporations, nearly all of whom had donated $500 (the maximum amount permitted under D.C. election law). Local political columnist Jonetta Rose Barras argued that this might actually prove a handicap to May's election, as she would have few places to turn for major donations later in the campaign. Both radio station WAMU and the Washington City Paper criticized May for taking advantage of the "LLC loophole" in city election finance law. (Note: D.C. campaign finance law limited corporations to a single $500 donation to each candidate for office. However, if an individual controlled more than one Limited Liability Company (or LLC), each LLC could give a $500 donation—effectively allowing the individual to circumvent the law.)

By late February, however, Barry had stumbled badly in the Ward 8 race, and May was seen by Mike DeBonis at The Washington Post as the front-runner in the election. May raised another $66,000 between January 30 and March 1, most of which came from real estate developers and construction firms. May had $130,000 on hand to spend during the last six weeks of the race, about four times as much money as her nearest competitor. May's fund-raising efforts were led by now-Mayor Muriel Bowser, who headlined several fund-raising meetings for her. Trayon White, meanwhile, raised just over $10,000 and $12,000 in his campaign coffere.

May received another boost in the crowded field of candidates when the D.C. Board of Elections randomly chose her name to appear second on the list of candidates. May's fundraising reached $239,621 as of March 10.

On April 3, May easily won a Ward 8 Democratic party straw poll, confirming her lead in the Ward 8 race. May received 177 votes, followed by Trayon White with 79 votes, Natalie Williams with 77 votes, Sheila Bunn with 53 votes, and Eugene Kinlow with 30 votes. (All others received fewer than 30 votes.) Will Sommer, writer of the influential "Loose Lips" political column for the Washington City Paper observed that May's win may have indicated trouble for her campaign: May paid for a free barbecue for all comers just two blocks from where the straw vote was held, and Mayor Muriel Bowser stood on a nearby street waving a May campaign sign. Yet, May could only muster fewer than 200 votes.

May was endorsed by the editorial board of The Washington Post on April 12. She had also won the endorsement of former Ward 8 Council Member Sandy Allen and the Gertrude Stein Democratic Club (a caucus of LGBT individuals affiliated with the D.C. Democratic Party). Bowser's support for May proved to be one of her critical assets, as Bowser turned a portion of her campaign organization over to May—providing her with hundreds of experienced volunteers and up-to-date voter lists. May also benefited from a close association with Phinis Jones, owner of Capitol Services Management. Although mayors are expected to campaign for candidates they endorse, other candidates in the Ward 8 race felt Bowser went far beyond all previous efforts.

In April 2015, Candidate Stuart Anderson dropped out of the race and urged voters to support Trayon White. Candidate Eugene D. Kinlow mailed a flyer to residents accusing May of favoring the interests of big business and developers outside Ward 8 to those of the residents of Ward 8. A Kinlow press release claimed that the charter public school May led was failing its students.

In an interview published on March 9, 2011, May told independent alternative newsweekly Inweekly, "If there were opportunities for me, I would love to return to Pensacola. ... I would appreciate the opportunity to serve the community which helped me to become the person that I am. But I am also practical and understand that I have greater access to resources away from Pensacola than I do in Pensacola."

In summer 2014, Jones was accused of gross mismanagement of and diversion of funds at the city-owned low-income Park Southern Apartments, leading to a fraud investigation by the D.C. Inspector General. May defended her relationship with Jones, saying, "Mr. Jones is a supporter, more importantly he is a Ward 8 voter. He invited some of his neighbors and friends to come in and hear me. Any opportunity to talk to Ward 8 voters is one that I accept." Other candidates and citizens who opposed May began to call her "a big-money 'outsider'," and called her a pawn of Bowser, the corporations, and the labor unions which had endorsed her.

Hundreds of people volunteered for May's campaign between December 2014 and April 2015. They canvassed most of Ward 8, and hundreds of people registered to vote. As election day neared, canvassing increased, and May provided vans to drive voters in the city's most transit-dependent ward to early voting locations downtown. May also sponsored a free barbecue and concert on April 13, the first day of early-voting. May also began to focus less on fund-raising. During the month of March, Ward 8 candidate Eugene Kinlow raised more funds than May. Although May had spent nearly $228,000 already, she still had $40,000 on hand. Her best-funded opponent, Kinlow, had just $5,000.

By the campaign's end, May had raised nearly $270,000.

=== Election results ===
Turnout in the Ward 8 special election on April 28, 2015, was especially high, with more than 6,200 ballots cast by the ward's nearly 52,000 voters. That was nearly 75 percent of the turnout in the 2014 mayoral primary—far exceeding expectations. Preliminary election results released late in the evening on April 28 showed LaRuby May with 1,711 votes and Trayon White with 1,559 votes, a difference of just 152 ballots. Although May outspent White 16-to-1, election observers said White had surged late in the race as an "anti-establishment vote" and that he had consolidated much of his support by drawing it from other candidates in the crowded field.

However, with 1,031 provisional and absentee ballots yet to be counted, the District of Columbia Board of Elections (BOE) said the outcome of the race was too close to call. Under D.C. election law, voters who engaged in same-day registration, whose current address did not match the one on file with the BOE, or those who voted in the wrong precinct now had 10 days to come forward and show proof of residency so that their votes would count. The Washington Post said its analysis showed White needed to win 65 percent of the provisional and absentee ballots to prevail. By May 7, with 823 provisional and absentee ballots counted, May led White by 80 votes. Two-hundred-and-seventeen provisional ballots remained uncounted, but the BOE said the deadline set by election law required voters to show proof of residency by 5 PM on Friday, May 9, to have their ballot count.

On May 9, the D.C. Board of Elections announced its final, unofficial ballot count in the Ward 8 special election. After counting 951 of the 1,031 provisional and absentee ballots, the BOE declared that LaRuby May won the election with 1,955 votes to Trayon White's 1,876—a margin of 79 votes, or 1.08 percent of all ballots cast. May picked up 244 votes (25.66 percent of all provisional and absentee ballots), and White 317 (33.33 percent of all provisional and absentee ballots cast). Under D.C. law, a winning margin of less than 1 percent creates an automatic recount, an outcome May avoided.

The BOE said it would certify the Ward 8 special election on May 14, 2015, and The Washington Post said May would likely be sworn in as a D.C. council member at that time. White said he would ask for a recount. But the BOE said that May would be able to take her seat immediately after the election is certified and she is sworn in, and that she would be able to begin council work right away. The BOE indicated that White's request for a recount would have to wait until the certification was made.

The D.C. Board of Elections certified the election results on May 14, 2015. May won with 1,955 votes to White's 1,877, a difference of 78 votes.

White initially asked for a recount on May 22. But just a few hours after the recount began on May 28, he asked the Board of Elections to suspend its recount. (Note: The BOE and several news outlets estimated the cost of a recount at $50 per precinct. This number was incorrect; as the BOE noted in a letter to White, the D.C. Code says $50 per precinct is only the down-payment required by law. The BOE advised White it estimated the cost of a full recount at $7,360. According to the Washington City Paper, a single day's recount cost $2,276.80, and as "White watched the recount bill balloon in May, he called off the recount early." White subsequently alleged that the BOE "duped him on the cost of a full recount".)

== Council term ==
LaRuby may was sworn in as the Ward 8 council member on May 14, 2015. The D.C. District Council had delivered three serious defeats to Mayor Bowser's budget and political goals in the past four months, and May was expected to help tip the balance of power on the Council heavily in Bowser's favor. On June 1, she was appointed to the council's committees on Housing and Community Development, Health and Human Services, and the Judiciary. According to the Washington City Paper, May pushed hard to reopen discussions on council budget compromises reached (but not enacted) before she was elected. May then strongly supported Bowser's budget initiatives, helping to defeat a push by Council Chairman Phil Mendelson to phase in tax cuts in July 2015 instead of the planned February 2016 date.

By April 2016, the Washington City Paper said, May had become "one of Muriel Bowser's most reliable votes on the Council."

=== Crime and violence ===
Violence in Ward 8 proved to be one of the biggest issues May confronted in her first term. By July 29, 80 homicides occurred in the city—30 of them in May's ward. "I've been a council member for 72 days, and I've already been to seven or eight funerals for people younger than me," May said. May discovered that no crime prevention program existed in her ward, that youth at risk of becoming involved in crime rarely participated in programs to help them, and neighborhood public safety meetings were so poorly attended that, she said, "it's not even worth having a meeting because people are not involved." To respond to the sharp increase in violence, May began holding "pop-up" events in different neighborhoods of her ward once a week during the D.C. Council recess. Each pop-up had May on-site meeting with residents, free food, and representatives from city government agencies and job placement agencies to assist residents in obtaining social services, medical care, or employment assistance. Private donors paid for the pop-ups. The pop-ups, The Washington Post said, also served as means of bolstering support for May in the ward, and as a means of registering new voters and obtaining voter contact information for May's likely renomination in the D.C. primary in June 2016.

In June 2015, May strongly supported a proposal by Mayor Bowser which would allow the Metropolitan Police Department to temporarily close for 96 hours any business suspected of selling "synthetic drugs". (Note: According to the New York State Department of Health, "A synthetic drug is a drug with properties and effects similar to a known hallucinogen or narcotic but having a slightly altered chemical structure, especially such a drug created in order to evade restrictions against illegal substances.") Bower's bill would also allow for temporary closure of a business for up to 30 days if a business were caught selling synethic drugs a second time, and imposition of a $100,000 fine (five times the current penalty). The District of Columbia Department of Consumer and Regulatory Affairs would also be given the authority revoke the license of any business caught selling the chemicals.

May also strongly supported Mayor Bowser's anti-crime package, and stood with Bowser in August 2015 at a shuttered school in the Congress Heights neighborhood as the mayor tried to build public support for the bill. But Bowser's speech was interrupted by activists with the Black Lives Matter movement, who also criticized May for her lack of response to the 95 percent increase in homicides in Ward 8. When the Council went back into session on September 16, 2015, after its summer break, May continued to strongly support the mayor's anti-crime package. During a Judiciary Committee hearing, May demanded that the council consider a "holistic approach" to the issue of crime and violence that would focus on education and jobs as well as traditional crime prevention and policing. May later voted in favor of compromise legislation whose centerpiece was a counseling, job training, and stipend program aimed at 200 of the city's most at-risk residents which would encourage them to avoid criminal enterprises. May worked with council member Jack Evans to amend the bill to enhance penalties for crimes committed on the Washington Metro, Metrobus, in city parks, and at city recreation centers. The amendment was defeated after Judiciary Committee chair Kenyan McDuffie pointed out that such penalties due little to deter crime and have not been enforced in D.C. The anti-crime package then passed the council on January 15, 2016. The bill would spend $3.9 million in fiscal 2016 and $25.6 million through fiscal 2019. The Bowser administration notified the council that it had no funds to implement the bill.

After D.C. special education teacher Alonzo Smith died in November 2015 while in the custody of security guards at an apartment building, May co-sponsored McDuffie's bill which to increase "special police" training to 24 hours from 16; require additional training in emergency procedures, interactions with tourists, and responses to terrorism to 32 hours from 24 hours; and require new training on how to de-escalate conflict, how to interact with people with disabilities or mental health problems, and how to avoid biased policing. During hearings on the bill, May characterized the training which the city's 17,000 security guards and special police receive as not rigorous, and suggested that landlords and employers tended to use such guards only in buildings which predominantly served or housed African Americans.

May also became concerned with graffiti, and in January 2016 co-sponsored a bill with Council member Brandon Todd (Ward 4) which would increase the fine for making graffiti to $2,500 from $250, and add a possible prison sentence of up to 180 days. The bill would increase the fine for "intent to graffiti" charge, to a range of $500 to $2,500 from an existing range of $100 to $1,000.

=== Cannabis clubs ===
May also wrestled with the issue of "cannabis clubs". District residents had overwhelmingly voted in November 2014 to legalize the personal use of marijuana. But under federal law, landlords who received Section 8 money to provide subsidized or free housing to the poor could evict anyone who used marijuana in these homes. Members of the public attempted to establish "cannabis clubs", where people could smoke marijuana away from the home. Fearful of a backlash in Congress, Mayor Bowser convinced the district council to enact emergency legislation in March 2015 temporarily banning cannabis clubs for 90 days. A majority of D.C. voters, and a majority of Ward 8 residents, backed the cannabis club concept. Bowser asked the council for extensions on the ban several times, and council complied.

On January 5, 2016, the council considered legislation to approve cannabis clubs. On an initial vote, May voted to approve the clubs. But after 30 minutes of intense lobbying by Mayor Bowser, May reversed her vote.

Reporter Aaron C. Davis of The Washington Post implied that May dared not oppose the mayor on the issue for fear of losing Bowser's financial backing in her reelection campaign. Davis said that many Ward 8 voters supported marijuana legalization because they felt that the police unfairly target African Americans for using it, and that May's reversal would anger her supporters. May declined to explain her vote to The Washington Post, and the newspaper believed she might yet support cannabis clubs when a final vote on the measure came before the council in February 2016.

=== D.C. Fire and EMS Department ===
Severe budgetary, administrative, personnel, and operations problems have plagued the District of Columbia Fire and Emergency Medical Services Department for years, resulting in the unnecessary death of residents, accidents, and embarrassing equipment breakdowns.

The council Judiciary Committee has oversight over the D.C. Fire and EMS Department. May missed the June 30, 2015, vote during which the committee voted to forward for approval the nomination of Acting District Fire Chief Gregory Dean to the full council. May also missed Dean's presentation on how he would improve the department. Dean was unanimously confirmed (with May present and voting) on July 14, 2015.

Dean identified an immediate need for more ambulances to meet city needs. Mayor Bowser asked the council for authority to contract with private ambulance services to provide this service. During hearings on the issue on October 1, May excoriated the DCFEMS for a "100 percent negative" experience while being transported during an emergency. "They mistreated me. They dogged me out. They said inappropriate language, inappropriate comments the entire time I was in the ambulance. Once they got me stable, I refused to continue to be transported by that ambulance." May also expressed her concern that private ambulance services would not treat African Americans or poor people with respect and dignity.

=== Basketball practice facility ===
Ward 8 has long suffered from a lack of economic development activity on the part of the city and private enterprise.

To help boost economic activity in the area, in mid-September 2015 Mayor Bowser announced a deal whereby the city would build a sports arena on the St. Elizabeths Hospital campus in Congress Heights. The District agreed to pay $23 million of the cost of the $55 million arena, which would be used as a practice facility by the Washington Wizards Washington Mystics professional basketball teams. Events DC, the taxpayer funded quasi-public corporation which operates Robert F. Kennedy Memorial Stadium, agreed to provide $27 million, while the Wizards/Mystics organization said its share was $5 million, bringing the total taxpayer contribution to 90 percent of the cost. Ted Leonsis, owner of the two teams, said he would also kick in $10 million in "redevelopment and community philanthropic" grants and initiatives. May said she completely backed the Bowser plan for the arena. In March 2016, May announced her opposition to legislation which would limit taxpayer spending in the event of cost overruns for the facility.

=== PEPCO study ===
In April 2014, the midwestern energy utility Exelon announced it was merging with Pepco, the regional mid-Atlantic energy utility which provides most of the power and natural gas to District of Columbia residents. On August 24, 2015, the District of Columbia Public Service Commission denied Pepco's petition to merge. The commission expressed deep concern over Pepco's lack of representation on the executive committee at Exelon, Exelon's commitment to coal-fired electrical generation (which is not in conformity with the District's policy of sustainable energy), and the potential for Exelon to force rate increases on D.C. residents. (Note: Exelon owns several nuclear power plants, whose electricity is sold at unregulated market rates. The D.C. commission feared that if Exelon lost money on its nuclear operations, it would ask D.C. residents—who did not benefit from the nuclear power—to pick up the tab.)

As the approval process played out, the district council considered ways to intervene. A majority of the council was concerned that the merger would not benefit local residents, but several council members were unwilling to take action to circumvent the public service commission process. Council member Mary Cheh proposed legislation which would fund a $250,000 study to see if the city should purchase Pepco and turn it into a public utility. At-Large council member Anita Bonds proposed a substitution in the form of an amendment that would have defunded the study. May supported Bonds, as did council member Vincent Orange, a former Pepco executive.

=== Dirt-bike racing ===
May was active on a wide range of legislative activities in addition to the above. When the issue of illegal dirt-bike racing on city streets became a crime and safety issue shortly after she joined the council, she proposed that instead of increasing penalties and fines that the city open a dirt bike racing park. When pressed, May could not say where the park should be located. May also supported Cheh's assisted suicide bill, arguing that it contained the necessary safeguards and did not interfere with religious belief. In September 2015, she co-sponsored a bill by council member Brianne Nadeau which would strip Advisory Neighborhood Commission members of their office if they missed more than three meetings in a row.

=== FreshPAC ===
Under existing District law, political action committees were barred from accepting more than $500 from any individual or corporation during an election cycle. The election cycle was defined as an election year, and the law permitted political action committees to raise unlimited funds in non-election years. After Bowser's election in November 2015, she and her political allies formed FreshPAC, named for Bowser's pledge to bring a "fresh start" to corruption-plagued politics in the city. The group raised nearly $350,000 by late August, and set a goal of $1,000,000 by the end of 2015. The possibility that FreshPAC would injection extremely large sums of money into local political races alarmed many in the city, especially when it became clear that donors to FreshPAC were Bowser administration appointees, had won or were bidding on contracts with the city, had expensive real estate development deals pending before city agencies, or were lobbyists with whom Bowser had shown an inappropriate friendliness. The district council quickly began considering a bill to change the law. On October 19, 2015, this legislation passed the council 11 to 2. The only council members voting against the bill were Brandon Todd, Bowser's former campaign director, and May—both of whom, The Washington Post pointed out, where facing an election in June 2016 and who needed Bowser's financial support. FreshPAC shut down, and returned all donations to their contributors.

=== Other legislation ===
May also authored a bill requiring the city to study the impact on children when a parent is imprisoned and provide recommendations to the city on how to help these children (it easily passed in November 2015), and introduced a bill to rename the Columbus Day holiday as "Indigenous Peoples' Day".

On June 21, 2016, May and fellow outgoing Council member Yvette Alexander provided the critical margin of victory in a 7-to-6 vote defeating a D.C. campaign finance reform bill which would have barred any person or contractor who donated to a city council election campaign from receiving a city contract worth $100,000 or more.

=== Political activities ===
May was involved in only a few political activities which brought media attention. In October 2015, she and seven other council members signed a letter asking Congress to not renew the D.C. Opportunity Scholarship program, a federally funded private school voucher program imposed on the city by Congress in 2004. The legislation gave 1,700 low-income students in the District up to $7,500 a year so that they could attend a private school in the city or nearby jurisdictions. Kevin Chavous, then a council member representing Ward 7, was the only member of the council to support the federal law.

Despite her opposition to the voucher program, May threw her support behind Democrats for Education Reform-D.C. (DFER-D.C.), an education PAC. The PAC was supported by Democrats for Education Reform, a "staunchly pro-charter and anti-teachers union" national political action committee which is largely funded by Wall Street. The group was co-founded by Chavous, who also once served as its chair. DFER-D.C. was supported by Mayor Bowser along with council members McDuffie and Todd and former Mayor Anthony A. Williams. The PAC said it would spend significant sums of money on candidates who supported its agenda.

=== Committees ===
May was appointed to the following committees for Council Period 21 (January 2015 to December 2016):

- Committee on Health and Human Services
- Committee on the Judiciary
- Committee on Housing and Community Development

== 2016 general election ==
=== June primary ===
May announced in mid-January 2016 that she was running for reelection to her Ward 8 council seat for a full term. Between August 1, 2015 and January 31, 2016, she raised more than $90,000 to spend on the June 14, 2016, Democratic Party primary. May was immediately endorsed by D.C. Mayor Muriel Bowser, who donated $500 (the maximum permitted) to May's campaign.

May's special election opponent, Trayon White, announced he would challenge May for reelection on February 8, 2016. White was endorsed by Karl Racine, Attorney General of the District of Columbia, and by former 2015 Democratic Primary opponents Marion Christopher Barry (son of the late mayor and former Ward 8 council member), Jauhar Abraham, and Stuart Anderson (who became White's 2016 primary campaign manager) Will Sommer, political reporter for the Washington City Paper, wrote on February 8 that no other candidates were expected to file in the race.

By March 2015, May had raised $183,000 for her reelection bid.

May lost the Democratic nomination to Trayon White, 51 percent to 43 percent (4,272 votes to 3,584 votes).

== Personal life ==
May has lived in the District of Columbia since 1997, and in Ward 8 since 2002. She is a member of Allen Chapel African Methodist Episcopal Church.

== Electoral results ==
=== 2015 ===
2015 Council of the District of Columbia, Ward8, Special election
Party	Candidate	Votes	%
Democratic	LaRuby May	1,955	27
Democratic	Trayon "WardEight" White	1,877	26
Democratic	Sheila Bunn	741	10
Democratic	Eugene D. Kinlow	693	9
Democratic	Natalie Williams	683	9
Democratic	Marion C. Barry	554	8
Democratic	"S.S." Sandra Seegars	331	5
	6 others and write-in	443	6

=== 2016 ===
2016 Council of the District of Columbia, Ward8, Democratic Party Primary election
Party	Candidate	Votes	%
Democratic	Trayon "Ward Eight" White	4,272	51
Democratic	LaRuby May	3,584	43
Democratic	Aaron Holmes	280	3
Democratic	Bonita Goode	75	1
Democratic	Maurice T. Dickens	70	1
Democratic	Write-in	30	0
