= Michael Schaffer (journalist) =

American journalist

- Citizenship: American
- Education: Columbia University (BA)
- Occupation: Journalist

Michael Schaffer is an American journalist who was editor of the Washingtonian. Previously, he was editorial director of The New Republic Washington City Paper.

After graduating from Columbia University in 1995, Schaffer was a Fulbright scholar in Sri Lanka. He began his career as a writer at City Paper, where he eventually became the editor David Carr's deputy. He later worked at U.S. News & World Report, where he covered national politics and the aftermath of the September 11 attacks in Pakistan and Afghanistan. He later worked for The Philadelphia Inquirer, mainly focusing on municipal politics and doing a tour of duty in Iraq. In 2007, he left the Inquirer to work on a book, One Nation Under Dog, published by Henry Holt in 2009. The next year, he returned to City Paper, replacing his longtime friend Erik Wemple as editor, a post he served from 2010 to 2012. He has also written for Slate, The Washington Post, POLITICO, Philadelphia, The Daily Beast, The Boston Globe and other publications.

In 2012, Schaffer joined The New Republic as editorial director, shortly after it was bought by Chris Hughes, and played a role in its redesign and online operations. In 2014, Schaffer was named the fourth editor in the Washingtonian's 49-year history. He left the Washingtonian to join Politico in December 2021 as senior editor.
