= Marion Barry (disambiguation) =

Marion Barry (1936–2014) was an American politician who was Mayor of the District of Columbia.

Marion Barry may also refer to:

- Marion Christopher Barry (1980–2016), American construction company owner, son of Marion Barry

== See also ==
- Maryanne Trump Barry (1937–2023), American attorney and U.S. federal judge
- Marion Berry (1942–2023), American politician from Arkansas
- Marionberry, a cultivar of blackberry
