= 2025 Council of the District of Columbia special election =

2025 local special election in the United States

2025 Council of the District of Columbia Ward 8 special election
- July 15, 2025
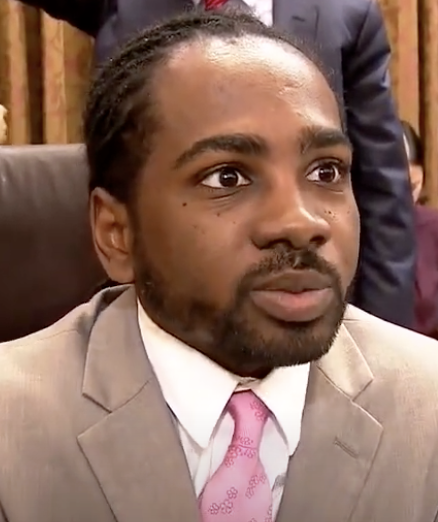

Candidate	Trayon White Sr.	Sheila Bunn
Party	Democratic	Democratic
Popular vote	2,392	2,140
Percentage	27.7%	24.8%
Candidate	Mike Austin	Salim Adofo
Party	Democratic	Democratic
Popular vote	2,103	1,932
Percentage	24.4%	22.4%
White
20–30%
30–40%
40–50%
Bunn
20–30%
30–40%
Austin
20–30%
30–40%
Adofo
30–40%
Councilmember before election
vacant
Elected Councilmember
Trayon White
Democratic

The 2025 Council of the District of Columbia special election was held on July 15, 2025, to elect the Ward 8 member of the Council of the District of Columbia. The election was called following the expulsion of Trayon White from the council.

== Background ==
Former councilmember Trayon White was re-elected in 2024 with 75% of the vote. White was indicted on federal bribery charges and arrested by the FBI in 2024. He was expelled from the council on February 4, 2025 after a court date was scheduled for bribery charges.

== Candidates ==
The deadline to submit 500 valid signatures to qualify for the ballot was April 17, 2025.

=== Democratic Party ===
- Salim Adofo, Advisory Neighborhood Commissioner, and candidate for the Council in 2024
- Mike Austin, former council staff member
- Sheila Bunn, former chief of staff to former councilman and mayor Vincent C. Gray and Delegate Eleanor Holmes Norton
- Trayon White, former councilmember (2017–2025)

Failed to qualify

- Jauhar Abraham, anti-violence activist
- Khadijah Clark, former candidate
- Eric T. Cleckley, former council aide
- Lawrence Grayson, business owner

Withdrawn

- Dion Jordan, former Advisory Neighborhood Commissioner for seat AC02
- Oliver Linner Roy, nonprofit founder

Endorsements

Mike Austin

Local officials

- Sandy Allen, former councilmember from Ward 8 (1997-2005)
- LaRuby May, former councilmember from Ward 8 (2015-2017)
- Eydie Whittington, former councilmember from Ward 8 (1995-1997)

Individuals

- Cora Masters Barry, widow of former mayor and councilmember Marion Barry

Organizations

- DC Association of Realtors
- Greater Greater Washington
Sheila Bunn

Local officials

- Wendell Felder, councilmember from Ward 7 (2025-present)

=== Republican Party ===
Withdrawn

- Kara Johnson, business owner

=== Independents ===
Failed to qualify

- Anthony O. DeVaughn
- Jennifer Gelencia Muhammad, activist

=== Write-in candidates ===
- Mary A. Roach (Democratic)
- Oliver L. Roy, non-profit founder (Democratic)
- Delonte Ford Singh (Republican)

== General election ==
2025 Council of the District of Columbia Ward 8 special election
Party	Candidate	Votes	%
Democratic	Trayon White	2,392	27.72%
Democratic	Sheila Bunn	2,140	24.80%
Democratic	Mike Austin	2,103	24.37%
Democratic	Salim Adofo	1,932	22.39%
Write-in		63	0.73%
Total votes		8,630	100.00%
