= Trayon White =

American politician (born 1984)

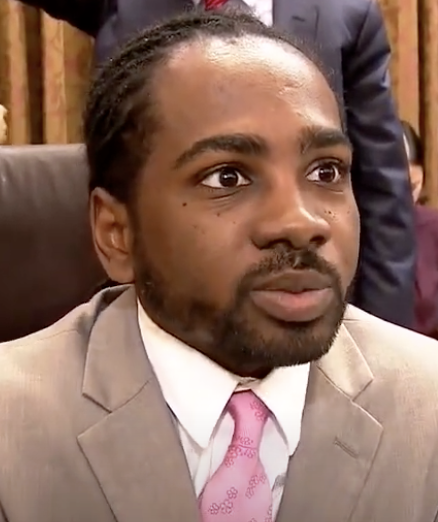
- White in 2024

Member of the Council of the District of Columbia from Ward 8
- Incumbent
- Assumed office August 8, 2025
- Preceded by: Himself
- In office January 2, 2017 – February 4, 2025
- Preceded by: LaRuby May
- Succeeded by: Himself

Personal details
- Born: May 11, 1984 (age 42) Washington, D.C., U.S.
- Party: Democratic
- Children: 2
- Education: University of Maryland, Eastern Shore (BA); Southeastern University (attended)

Trayon White (born May 11, 1984) is an American politician from Washington, D.C. A member of the Democratic Party, he represented Ward 8 on the Council of the District of Columbia from 2017 to 2025. White was expelled from office in February 2025 following an indictment on federal bribery charges. White returned to his seat in August 2025 after winning the July 2025 special election for the seat.

Prior to serving on the council, White was a community organizer and served on the D.C. State Board of Education. White was an unsuccessful candidate in the 2022 mayoral election, taking third place in the Democratic primary against incumbent Muriel Bowser. On August 18, 2024, White was arrested by the Federal Bureau of Investigation on bribery charges. He was expelled from the D.C. Council on February 4, 2025.

As a member of the D.C. Council, White has drawn media coverage for promoting antisemitic conspiracy theories and conspiracy theories about the FBI.

== Early life and education ==
White was born on May 11, 1984, in Washington, D.C., and was raised in the Southeast quadrant. He experienced poverty during his childhood and has stated that violence was common in his neighborhood. As a teenager, he was arrested for car theft but was not prosecuted.

White attended Ballou High School in Ward 8, graduating in 2002. He later earned a bachelor's degree in business administration from the University of Maryland Eastern Shore in 2006. White later enrolled at a Master's degree program in public administration at Southeastern University in Washington, D.C., but apparently did not complete his studies.

== Community activism ==
White first became involved with the East of the River Clergy Police Community Partnership (ERCPCP) while in high school. He remained involved as a mentor and sports coach while in college and joined ERCPCP as a paid community outreach worker in 2006.

In November 2007, White founded Helping Inner City Kids Succeed (HICKS), a nonprofit organization dedicated to helping poverty-stricken children east of the Anacostia River in Washington, D.C. White received the Linowes Leadership Award from the Community Foundation for the National Capital Region in May 2008 for his work with at-risk young people. In 2011, an editorial in The Washington Post said White's nonprofit "is doing interesting work with inner-city youth" and that White had real insight "into the problems confronted by students in Ward 8 schools".

During his time as a community activist, White was mentored by William O'Neal Lockridge, a longstanding member of the D.C. Board of Education. He also became known as a protégé of Marion Barry, then D.C. Councilmember representing Ward 8 and former Mayor of the District of Columbia.

== D.C. Board of Education ==
White was elected to the District of Columbia Board of Education in 2011 and reelected in 2012. During his tenure, he supported school development projects and advocated for education reform. He resigned from the board in 2014 after accepting a position with the District of Columbia Department of Parks and Recreation, as city law prohibited holding both roles simultaneously.

== D.C. Council campaigns ==
=== 2015 special election in Ward 8 ===
On November 23, 2014, incumbent Councilmember Marion Barry died at United Medical Center, hours after having been released from Howard University Hospital. White was one of the people Barry called immediately after leaving Howard. On December 16, The Washington Post reported that White was one of many individuals contemplating a run for Barry's Ward 8 council seat. In December 2014, White filed as a candidate in the special election to fill the remainder of Barry's term under the name "Trayon 'WardEight' White. White faced candidates LaRuby May and former Vincent C. Gray mayoral aide Sheila Bunn. White was defeated by LaRuby May in the Democratic primary election on April 28, 2015, receiving 25.8% of the vote to May's 26.9%. White initially asked for a recount on May 22, but later asked for the Board of Elections to suspend its recount on May 28, hours before the recount was scheduled to begin. (Note: The BOE and several news outlets estimated the cost of a recount at $50 per precinct. This number was incorrect; as the BOE noted in a letter to White, the D.C. Code says $50 per precinct is only the down-payment required by law. The BOE advised White that it estimated the cost of a full recount at $7,360. According to the Washington City Paper, a single day's recount cost $2,276.80, and as "White watched the recount bill balloon in May, he called off the recount early." White subsequently alleged that the BOE "duped him on the cost of a full recount".)

=== 2016 election in Ward 8 ===
White spent the next year maintaining a high profile in Ward 8, routinely attending demonstrations in favor of better public housing and job training and against gentrification, and visiting areas where murders occurred. (Note: The District's homicide rate increased from 105 in 2014 to 162 in 2015, and more than 50 homicides occurred in Ward 8 alone.) White led protests against Mayor Bowser's proposed anti-crime proposals. (Note: Mayor Bowser had proposed strongly enhanced penalties for violent crime and new authority for the police to execute warrantless searches of violent criminals, among other aspects of a wide-ranging anti-crime package. These provoked strongly negative reactions from Ward 8 residents, who saw them as punitive, racist, and ignoring the root causes of crime.) White's work attracted the strong support of teenagers and young adults in their 20s.

On June 18, 2015, White was hired as a temporary employee in the Office of the Attorney General of the District of Columbia. He worked as a Community Development Specialist, focusing on education, engagement, and outreach to organizations and communities. His portfolio focused on at-risk youth, juvenile justice issues, combatting designer drug use, and general outreach to neighborhoods east of the Anacostia River. His employment ended on September 30, 2015.

On February 8, 2016, White filed as a candidate for the Ward 8 District Council seat in the Democratic primary. Few other candidates were expected to run in the race, and at the filing deadline White already had the endorsements of Jauhar Abraham, Stuart Anderson, Marion Christopher Barry, (Note: Barry's endorsement came in July 2015, even though White had not declared a candidacy.) and Karl Racine, Attorney General of the District of Columbia. In addition to May, White faced candidates Maurice Dickens, Bonita Goode, and Aaron Holmes. White won the Democratic primary election on June 14, 2016 with 51.4% of the vote and later won the November 8, 2016 general election unopposed.

=== Reelection candidacies ===
White faced three challengers in the 2020 Democratic primary: former UMC executive Mike Austin; his former campaign manager Stuart Anderson; and attorney Yaida Ford. White's March 2018 antisemitic statements were not an issue in the primary, with challengers arguing that White engaged in too much constituent servicing and not enough legislating.

Voter turnout in Ward 8 dropped 20 percent in 2020 over the 2016 primary. In what was supposed to be a mail-in election due to the covid-19 health crisis, just 3,500 mail-in ballots were requested, while 3,200 residents cast in-person votes at the three physical polling places. White won the primary with 60.3% of the vote in unofficial overnight results.

In 2024, White ran for reelection to the Council. He won the Democratic primary with 51.5% of the vote.

== Council tenure ==
White was sworn into office at noon on January 2, 2017. In 2017, White spoke to NPR about the ward's work on how to help finding critically missing children. In March 2018, White organized protests against a development in his Ward. Targeting developers Bozzuto and Chapman Development, White complained that they did not hire enough local labor and contractors.

White pointed to the opening of a new Washington Wizards practice facility, the opening of a Starbucks, tax increment financing to construct a mixed-use affordable housing/hotel/office building, and the construction of a new building to replace the aging United Medical Center (UMC) as evidence of his successful first term in office. The Washington Post characterized his voting record on liberal issues as mixed, noting, for example, that he reliably supported expanding social services yet also voted in favor of overturning a voter-passed initiative to give tipped workers the minimum wage. He spent much of his time engaging in constituent service, such as distributing free groceries, attending protests, intervening with police, and distributing cloth masks during the covid-19 crisis.

During his time on the council, White pushed for the removal of trees on Xenia Street in Ward 8. In 2023, The Atlantic found that the trees in question were not opposed by neighborhood at large. Rather, the opposition to the trees was spearheaded by Darryl Ross who believed that the trees were bad for home values. Ross did not live in the neighborhood but owned an apartment there that he rented out. Ross was treasurer of White's constituent services fund, which critics have called a "slush fund."

== Jewish conspiracy theory controversy ==
In March 2018, White sparked controversy by stating that the Rothschild family controls the weather. Following the response from community members and leaders, White apologized, met with Jewish community leaders, and visited the United States Holocaust Memorial Museum. During his visit on April 19, White reportedly abruptly left the 90-minute tour halfway through.

=== Initial post and reaction ===
On March 16, 2018, White posted a video on his official Facebook page showing snow flurries falling, alluding to the conspiracy theory of the Rothschild family conspiring to manipulate the weather. In his post, he stated, "Y'all better pay attention to this climate control, man, this climate manipulation. ... And that's a model based off the Rothschilds controlling the climate to create natural disasters they can pay for to own the cities, man. Be careful." The comment was widely reported in Washington and worldwide media as an endorsement of an antisemitic conspiracy theory.

The Washington City Paper reported on March 19 that this was not the first time White alluded to a Jewish conspiracy to control global weather. White later apologized for making the statement, and said he was working with Jews United for Justice to develop a deeper understanding of antisemitism. According to The Washington Post, several Jewish organizations in the area said they believed White's apology was sincere and that his comments seemed to have been made from a position of ignorance rather than antisemitism.

=== Video of previous comments ===
On March 19, 2018, the Council released footage of a February event (Note: The Council routinely releases footage of public events, and the new footage was made public as part of this regularly-scheduled release.) in which White claimed that the Rothschilds controlled the World Bank and the U.S. government. In the video, White says, "There's this whole concept with the Rothschilds—control the World Bank, as we all know—infusing dollars into major cities. They really pretty much control the federal government, and now they have this concept called resilient cities in which they are using their money and influence into local cities." Mayor Bowser, council members, and other city leaders attending the event showed puzzlement at White's remarks but did not condemn them at the time.

In an apology to his fellow council members, White explained why he had come to believe in the conspiracy theory: "Somehow, I read and misconstrued both the Rockefeller and Rothchild [sic] theories. At that breakfast, I indeed misspoke, was really misinformed on the issue and ran with false information. I think I heard other similar information before about the theory around the World Bank and put it all together."

== 2022 mayoral candidacy ==
White unsuccessfully ran for mayor of the District of Columbia in 2022 against incumbent Muriel Bowser. Bowser ultimately won the Democratic primary election with 49% of the vote, with White coming in third place with 9% of the vote.

== Arrest, expulsion, and return ==
On August 18, 2024, White was arrested by the Federal Bureau of Investigation (FBI) for allegedly accepting bribes. The FBI stated that White had accepted $156,000 of bribes in order to pressure District employees to give $5.2 million-worth of contracts to the companies that had given him the payments. The companies wanted White to use his position of chairman of Council's Committee on Recreation, Libraries and Youth Affairs to pressure employees at the Office of Neighborhood Safety and Engagement and the Department of Youth Rehabilitation Services.

The contracts were for providing violence intervention services. The FBI has said it had video of the arrangement. During his initial appearance in federal court on August 19, 2024, White did not enter a plea. However, it was agreed as condition for his release from prison, he had to surrender his passport and any guns and must also notify pretrial services if he plans to travel outside the D.C. area.

In February 2025, the D.C. Council voted unanimously to expel White, which triggered a special election for the remainder of the term. Since White had not been convicted, he remained eligible to seek reelection to the seat. The special election for the seat was held on July 15, 2025, which White won. He was sworn back in to his council seat on August 8, 2025.

== Electoral results ==
=== 2011 ===
2011 District of Columbia State Board of Education, Ward 8, Special election
Party	Candidate	Votes	%
Nonpartisan	Trayon White	981	33
Nonpartisan	Philip Pannell	779	26
Nonpartisan	Eugene DeWitt Kinlow	469	16
Nonpartisan	Anthony Muhammad	274	9
Nonpartisan	Sandra Williams	221	7
Nonpartisan	W. Cardell Shelton	84	3
Nonpartisan	Tijwanna U. Phillips	66	2
	2 others and write-in	117	4

=== 2012 ===
2012 District of Columbia State Board of Education, Ward 8, General election
Party	Candidate	Votes	%
Nonpartisan	Trayon White	21,078	73
Nonpartisan	Philip Pannell	7,557	26
Write-in		131	0

=== 2015 ===
2015 Council of the District of Columbia, Ward 8, Democratic Party Special election
Party	Candidate	Votes	%
Democratic	LaRuby May	1,955	27
Democratic	Trayon White	1,877	26
Democratic	Sheila Bunn	741	10
Democratic	Eugene D. Kinlow	693	10
Democratic	Natalie Williams	683	9
Democratic	Marion C. Barry	554	8
Democratic	7 others, write-in, over-votes, and under-votes	805	11

=== 2016 ===
2016 Council of the District of Columbia, Ward 8, Democratic Party Primary election
Party	Candidate	Votes	%
Democratic	Trayon White	4,272	51
Democratic	LaRuby May	3,584	43
Democratic	Aaron Holmes	280	3
Democratic	Bonita Goode	75	1
Democratic	Maurice T. Dickens	70	1
Democratic	Write-in	30	0

2016 Council of the District of Columbia, Ward 8, General election
Party	Candidate	Votes	%
Democratic	Trayon White	25,870	98
Write-in		469	2

=== 2020 ===
2020 Council of the District of Columbia, Ward 8, Democratic Party Primary election
Party	Candidate	Votes	%
Democratic	Trayon White	4,050	59
Democratic	Mike Austin	1,801	26
Democratic	Yaida Ford	525	8
Democratic	Stuart Anderson	336	5
Write-in		167	2

2020 Council of the District of Columbia, Ward 8, General election
Party	Candidate	Votes	%
Democratic	Trayon White	25,340	79
Independent	Fred Hill	4,745	15
Independent	Christopher Cole	1,023	3
Republican	Nate 'Ward 8' Derenge	717	2
Write-in		316	1

=== 2022 ===
2022 Mayor of the District of Columbia, Democratic Party Primary election
Party	Candidate	Votes	%
Democratic	Muriel E. Bowser	62,391	49
Democratic	Robert White	51,557	41
Democratic	Trayon "Washington DC" White	11,193	9
Write-in		406	0

=== 2024 ===
2024 Council of the District of Columbia Democratic primary, Ward 8
Party	Candidate	Votes	%
Democratic	Trayon White	3,115	52.98
Democratic	Salim Adofo	1,600	27.21
Democratic	Rahman Branch	1,129	19.20
Write-in		36	0.61
Total votes		5,880	100.0

2024 Council of the District of Columbia general election, Ward 8
Party	Candidate	Votes	%
Democratic	Trayon White	20,371	75.84%
Republican	Nate Derenge	3,981	14.82%
Write-in		2,509	9.34%
Total votes		26,861	100.0

=== 2025 ===
2025 Council of the District of Columbia Ward 8 special election
Party	Candidate	Votes	%
Democratic	Trayon White	2,392	27.72%
Democratic	Sheila Bunn	2,140	24.80%
Democratic	Mike Austin	2,103	24.37%
Democratic	Salim Adofo	1,932	22.39%
Write-in		63	0.73%
Total votes		8,630	100.00%
