= Will Sommer =

American journalist (born 1988)

- Born: June 17, 1988 (age 38)
- Education: Georgetown University (BS)
- Occupation: Journalist
- Writing career
- Years active: 2010–present
- Subjects: QAnon; American political conspiracy theories; Trumpism; right-wing extremism; alt-right

Will Sommer (born June 17, 1988) is an American journalist working at The Bulwark. Previously, he worked as a politics reporter for The Daily Beast since 2018, a campaign editor for The Hill, the Loose Lips columnist for the Washington City Paper, and as a media reporter for The Washington Post. In his journalism, Sommer covers right-wing media, political radicalization and right-wing conspiracy theories in the United States.

== Early life and education ==
From 2006 to 2010, Sommer studied Foreign Service and International Politics at Georgetown University, graduating with a BS degree. While at the university, Sommer contributed to the student-run news magazine The Georgetown Voice.

== Journalism ==
=== Jacob Wohl and Jack Burkman ===
Since their first press conference in November 2018 accusing Robert Mueller of sexual misconduct, Sommer has followed the numerous false claims made against public officials by conservative political operatives Jacob Wohl and Jack Burkman. After making their debunked claims against Mueller, Wohl and Burkman went on to make similar claims against Pete Buttigieg, Elizabeth Warren, Kamala Harris and Anthony Fauci throughout 2019 and early 2020. Sommer himself attended these press conferences that were held on the steps of Burkman's Virginia townhouse.

An exposé by Sommer revealed the details of how Wohl and Burkman recruited a fake Buttigieg accuser by telling him that they were operating as a 'task force' set up by the Trump Administration. The fake accuser secretly recorded the conversation with Wohl and Burkman using the voice recording app on his phone and leaked the audio to The Daily Beast.

Sommer has also paid attention to the legal troubles faced by Wohl and Burkman due to robocalls they made in the states of Michigan, Pennsylvania, Ohio and New York in an attempt to influence the 2020 presidential election with voter intimidation targeted towards minority voters. Sommer estimated that, if they are found liable in a federal lawsuit brought by New York attorney general Letitia James, Wohl and Burkman could face $2.75 million in damages for their robocalls.

=== QAnon ===
Sommer has extensively reported on the promulgation of the far-right QAnon conspiracy theory throughout 2020 and 2021. Sommer has described adherents to QAnon as "believ[ing] that the world, as revealed to them by Q, is run by a cabal of satanic cannibal pedophiles who torture children in satanic rituals, that these people are in the Democratic Party, in Hollywood and in banking, and that they've controlled the world for centuries." Older Republicans are also more likely to be attracted to QAnon compared to younger ones who engage more directly with the alt-right, according to Sommer. These older Republicans are "white, probably an evangelical Christian and, frankly, more likely to fall for something on the internet".

In his reporting on the movement, Sommer has highlighted the activities of QAnon at the January 6 Capitol storming and during the Biden Presidency, such as the potential threats of violence posed by adherents to QAnon. The potential for violence has been connected to the beliefs that Joe Biden would be arrested by Donald Trump at his inauguration or that Trump would be reinstated as President of the United States on March 4, 2021.

In May 2021, Sommer was ejected from a QAnon conference being held in Dallas, Texas which featured guests such as Michael Flynn and Sidney Powell. Sommer had paid for a ticket to attend and cover the event but his ticket was cancelled and he was not refunded.

On June 24, 2021, Sommer reported "gleeful" QAnon chatter on the internet about their expectations to be able to punish thousands of people soon through "executions" for perceived transgressions.

Sommer's book on QAnon, entitled Trust the Plan: The Rise of QAnon and the Conspiracy That Reshaped America, was published on February 21, 2023, by HarperCollins. He was also featured as an expert on QAnon in HBO's Q: Into the Storm and After Truth: Disinformation and the Cost of Fake News.

=== Mike Lindell ===
In June 2021, MyPillow CEO Mike Lindell told The Daily Beast that he believed it was likely that he was the inspiration for Trump to have the idea of being reinstated as president in August 2021.

=== Fever Dreams ===
Sommer was a co-host of the podcast Fever Dreams for The Daily Beast, first with Asawin Suebsaeng and later with Kelly Weill, during the entirety of its run from 2022 to 2023.

== Personal life ==
Sommer lives in Washington, D.C. and has a cat named Hazel.

== Books ==
- Sommer, Will (2023). Trust the Plan: The Rise of QAnon and the Conspiracy That Reshaped America. New York: HarperCollins.
