= Loose Lips (column) =

Loose Lips is a politics column published in the Washington City Paper, an alternative weekly newspaper serving the Washington, D.C., metropolitan area. It is billed as "The definitive guide to hometown politics in the nation's capital."

== History ==
In 1983, when Ken Cummins started writing it, "Loose Lips" began as a political gossip column, encompassing both local and national politics. Over the next decade, the format eventually became entirely devoted to Washington, D.C., local politics, focusing on intrigue in the mayor's office, the D.C. Council, and the city bureaucracy.

In January 1999, Cummins retired; contributing editor Erik Wemple replaced him. In November 2000, Wemple left the post to become senior editor and was replaced by Jonetta Rose Barras, a longtime contributor to the paper. Barras resigned from the paper on August 13, 2001, and Elissa Silverman held the position from January 2002 until December 2004, when her employment with the newspaper was terminated. Former WAMU-FM reporter James Jones wrote the column from March 2005 through June 21, 2007, when he posted his "last column" as "Loose Lips" and stated that a successor to him would be appointed soon. Mike DeBonis, formerly City Paper's senior editor, was named the sixth Loose Lips columnist in July 2007. His first column appeared that September. Mike DeBonis left the position to join The Washington Post.

=== 2010-present ===
In 2010, Alan Suderman became the seventh Loose Lips, after leaving a position as a Washington Examiner reporter. In 2013, Suderman left to work for the Center for Public Integrity.

The next Loose Lips, Will Sommer, was previously a City Desk writer for the Washington City Paper. Veteran journalist and former Washington Times reporter Jeffrey Anderson wrote the column starting in 2016. Andrew Giambrone took over the column in 2018 for a brief period. A former reporter for the Pacific Northwest Inlander, Mitch Ryals, started writing for Loose Lips in October 2018.

== Conventions ==
"Loose Lips" is typically 1,200 to 2,000 words long.

The column is written in the third person; the columnist refers to himself or herself as "LL." From its inception until Barras wrote the column, then again until October 2003, the column was unsigned, lending the a column a gossipy, "hush-hush" feel. Since then, the writer of "Loose Lips" provides a byline.

Cummins coined the sobriquet "Mayor-for-Life" for former D.C. mayor Marion Barry. Until Barry returned to the D.C. Council in 2005, "LL" columns have almost always referred to him as "Mayor-for-Life Marion S. Barry Jr." Barry's third wife, Cora Masters Barry, received a similar treatment: "Cora Masters Lady MacBarry."

The first occurrence of the name of each person mentioned in the column appears in bold face.
