= Erik Wemple =

American journalist

- Education: Hamilton College
- Occupation: Media critic

Erik Wemple is an American journalist. He worked at The Washington Post from 2011 to 2025, TBD.com from 2010 to 2011, and was editor of the alternative weekly Washington City Paper from 2002 to 2010. He had worked as a journalist in the Paper previously. He joined The New York Times in September 2025.

Since 2017, Wemple has been known for feuding with former Fox News host Tucker Carlson both on- and off-air.

== Early life and education ==
Erik Wemple was one of three sons of Clark C. Wemple, who served as a member of the New York State Assembly from 1966 to 1982. Wemple was raised in nearby Niskayuna, New York. He attended Hamilton College in Clinton, Oneida County, New York, and graduated in 1986.

== Career ==
Wemple began contributing articles to the Washington City Paper in the late 1990s. From January 1999 to November 2000 he wrote the paper's political column, "Loose Lips", before becoming editor. Previously, he was Washington correspondent for Inside.com and CableWorld magazine.

In 2004, the Association of Alternative Newsweeklies awarded Wemple and Josh Levin an Alternative Newsweekly Award for their article "Off Target", published in Washington City Paper.

In June 2006, Wemple accepted the editor-in-chief position at The Village Voice. A month later, he announced he would not assume the position, stating that "the paper's ownership and I have failed to come to terms in our many discussions about moving forward, particularly with respect to newsroom management."

In February 2010, Wemple informed the staff of the Washington City Paper that he was leaving to be the new editor of TBD.com.

In 2013, J. K. Trotter of Gawker Media declared Wemple a "hero", and that "like a deeply embedded anthropologist, Wemple scours Washington media (and, not infrequently, their New York counterparts) for hypocrisy, excess, and corruption. He's the anti-Mike Allen, frequently piercing the Politico's madman's self-inflating bubble of hype at the moment it threatens to blot out the sun."

In February 2017, Wemple appeared on Tucker Carlson's show to discuss media bias. Carlson criticized Wemple in this interview for not covering mistakes made by The Washington Post. In 2021, Carlson criticized Wemple for contacting several of his college classmates and attempting to find "naughty" things he had done when he was 19. Carlson compared Wemple's investigation into him to politicians investigating their opponents' past scandals. In 2022, Wemple wrote an opinion column about the allegations of nepotism against Carlson's son, Buckley Carlson. When reached for comment, Tucker Carlson responded: "normal people understand it’s wrong to go after a man's family, but you don't because you're a soulless ghoul who literally works for Jeff Bezos. Go fuck yourself".

Major turnover affected the Post in 2025, with many staffers and journalists leaving. Wemple was one of the journalists who accepted a buyout, leaving at the end of July. He began to work for The New York Times as a media critic in September 2025, although still out of Washington, DC.

== Personal life ==
Wemple is married to Stephanie Mencimer, who, as of 2018, worked as a staff reporter in the Washington office of Mother Jones.
