= Brandon Todd (politician) =

American politician and lobbyist (born 1983)

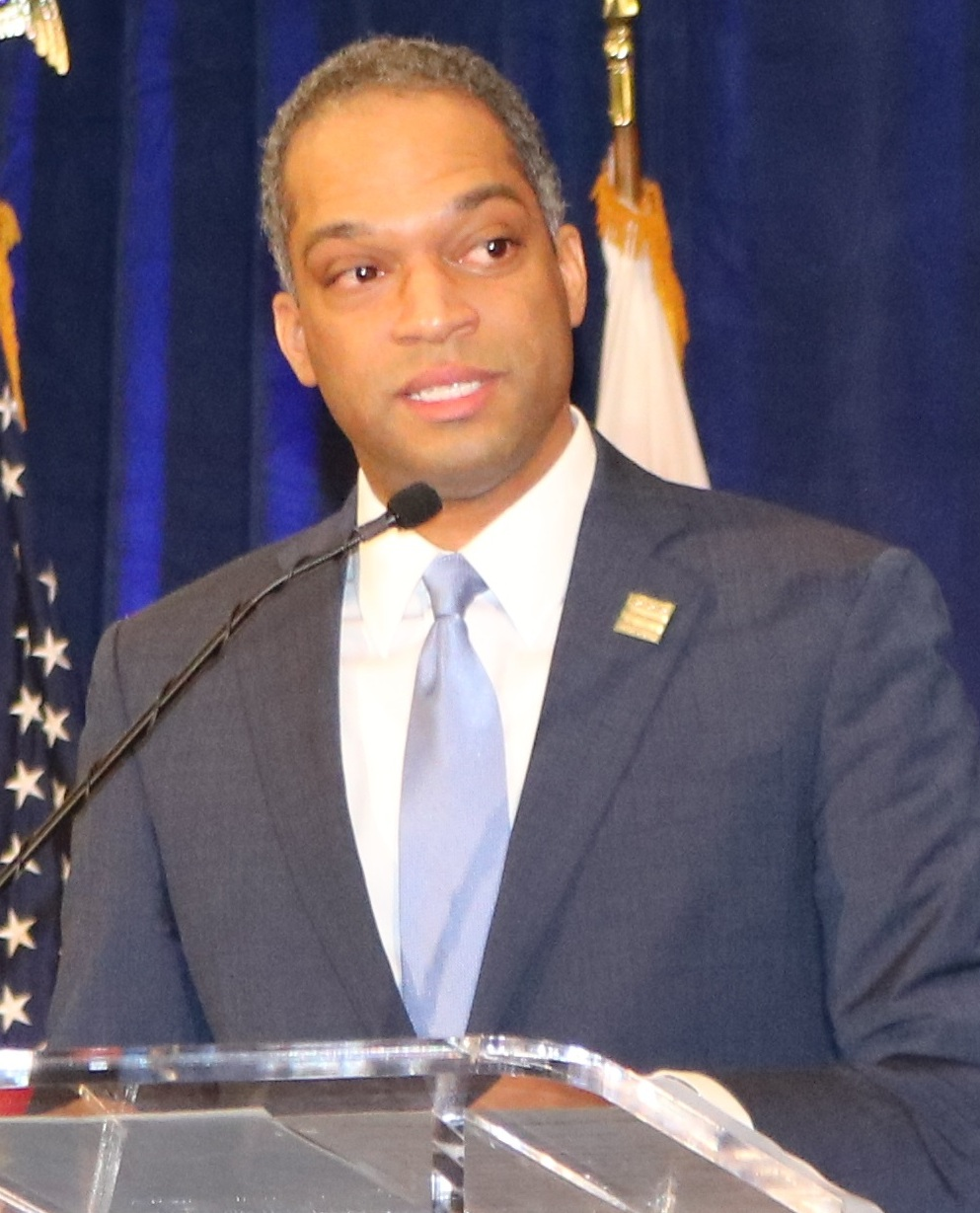

Member of the Council of the District of Columbia from the 4th ward
- In office May 14, 2015 – January 2, 2021
- Preceded by: Muriel Bowser
- Succeeded by: Janeese Lewis George

Personal details
- Born: Brandon Tristan Todd; May 26, 1983 (age 43) Washington, D.C., U.S.
- Party: Republican (before 2007); Democratic (2007–present)
- Education: Bowie State University (BA); Trinity Washington University (MBA)

Brandon Tristan Todd (born May 26, 1983) is a lobbyist for Washington Gas and a former American politician who represented Ward 4 on the Council of the District of Columbia. Todd previously worked in the Council office of Muriel Bowser and in various campaign positions during her successful campaign for Mayor of the District of Columbia. Todd won a special election in May 2015, succeeding Muriel Bowser, who was elected as mayor. After serving one full term on the council, Todd lost the 2020 Democratic primary to Janeese Lewis George.

== Early life and education ==
Todd was born on May 26, 1983, and raised in Washington, D.C. He graduated from Eastern High School and has a communications degree from Bowie State University and a Master in Business Administration from Trinity Washington University. In 2005, while in college, Todd declared bankruptcy for more than $20,000 in unpaid debts. His creditors were primarily credit card companies, with charges from clothing retailers.

== Career ==
Todd joined the Democratic Party in October 2007 after voting in five elections as a member of the Republican Party.

In 2012, Todd managed Bowser's campaign for reelection as Ward 4 Councilmember. He served as Bowser's director of constituent services. In the same year, Todd was elected as a delegate to the Democratic National Convention representing Wards 3, 4, 5, and 7.

In March 2013, Todd coordinated a construction job fair for workers skilled in mechanical, electrical, plumbing, concrete, rough carpentry, masonry, roofing, and waterproofing in Fort Totten Square.

On June 5, 2013, Todd was elected chair of the Ward 4 Democrats. He launched a new web site and Twitter account for the organization. In 2014, he was Finance Director for Bowser's mayoral campaign.

=== Electoral history ===
==== 2015 special election ====
On December 4, 2014, Todd announced his candidacy for councilmember for Ward 4 after the position was vacated when Bowser was elected mayor in the April special election. Within three days of his announcement, Todd had raised $50,000. In the final campaign finance filing before the election, Todd had three times the financial reserves of his nearest rival. Todd accepted donations from LLCs owned by companies, which allowed companies to donate additional money to the campaign.

Todd advertised his close relationship with the mayor, saying he was the only candidate in the field who would be able to pick up the phone and discuss the ward's needs directly with her. At a debate, it was reported that Todd searched on Google when asked to name a historical figure whose leadership he admired. His campaign had no comment on the action. Todd won with 42% of the vote.

==== 2016 general election ====
In the June 14, 2016 D.C Council Ward 4 Democratic primary election, Todd won with 49% of the vote. He received the endorsements of the Gertrude Stein Democratic Club, Democrats for Education Reform, and The Washington Post. Todd won reelection for a full four-year term in the general election on November 8, 2016. He garnered 35,100 votes.

==== 2020 primary election ====
Todd lost the June 2020 primary election to progressive activist and former D.C. Assistant Attorney General Janeese Lewis George, a self-described democratic socialist, 7,926 to 6,386 votes.

=== Council of the District of Columbia ===
==== First term ====
During his campaign, Todd said that he opposed awarding the operation of DC's prisons to a controversial private management company. After his election, Todd said that the council should not be involved in awarding the contract.

While campaigning, Todd was one of the few candidates who did not oppose pop-ups, or housing extensions above the original height. After winning office and in the wake of community protests, he said he was "not outright opposed to pop-ups but that he wanted to find a balance between new housing units and neighbors' concerns."

In 2016, amid community opposition Todd announced his support for Mayor Bowser's plan to open a homeless shelter in Ward 4, hoping that it would be used as a catalyst for economic development.

After a building was condemned in Ward 4 and its residents forced to vacate the property, Todd was described as not helpful. A spokesperson for Todd said he was aware of the condemnation.

In April 2017, the DC Auditor announced that it was conducting an investigation into the financing of Todd's 2015 special election campaign. As a result, Todd was fined $5,100 by the office of campaign finance, which he paid in-full. Todd was unable to substantiate donations of over $100,000 and failed to report $34,000 in donations. While the investigation was underway during the 2016 general election, it was not disclosed.

In November 2017, Todd supported legislation that would jump-start economic development and revitalization along the Kennedy Street Corridor.

==== Second term ====
Todd was sworn into office for a full four-year council term at noon on January 2, 2017.

On January 20, 2017, Todd joined Councilmembers Jack Evans and Anita Bonds, as well as Mayor Muriel Bowser at the parade for the inauguration of Donald Trump, saying "It's important that we get to know the Trump administration and they get to know the District. And the first step in that is being here for a peaceful transition of power."

Todd supported the modernization of West Elementary School during the Fiscal Year 2018 budget negotiations.

When anti-immigrant flyers were spread around Ward 4, Todd stated that "Xenophobic and hostile flyers will not be tolerated. All residents, regardless of race, color, creed, religious affiliation or sexual preference, deserve to feel safe and respected in their community."

On September 19, 2017, Todd introduced the "Universal Free Lunch for All Amendment Act of 2017," which would provide lunch for all students in District of Columbia public schools, public charter schools, and participating private schools free of charge.

On October 3, 2017, Todd helped secure passage of the "Standard of Care for Animals Amendment Act of 2017," a comprehensive animal welfare bill to protect the health and safety of District animals.

On December 4, 2017, Todd introduced a bill to strengthen identity theft protections for children and eliminate credit freeze fees for all District residents. The "Identity Protection Amendment Act of 2017" would enable a parent or guardian of a child to place a credit freeze on their behalf. The legislation was developed in concert with the Attorney General of the District of Columbia, (OAG). It builds on similar emergency legislation introduced by OAG and temporarily passed into law after the Equifax data breach.

On December 5, 2017, Todd secured passage of his "Office on African American Affairs Establishment Act of 2017," legislatively creating an office with grant-making authority to develop, implement, and support policies and programs for African American advancement in the District of Columbia.

Todd introduced legislation that would create an Office of Nightlife to act as a liaison between government, community leaders and business owners to ensure that all residents benefit from the proliferation of bars, restaurants and entertainment venues in the nation's capitol in recent years. The bill received support from both the business community and community leaders.

Todd was active in responding to widespread reports from Ward 4 residents about Metro trains vibrating their homes. He sent three separate letters to the Washington Metropolitan Area Transit Authority General Manager over the course of a year to solicit more information and ask for expedited progress.

Todd supported campaign finance reform by voting in favor of the "Fair Elections Act of 2017".

In 2018, Todd was the sole Councilmember who opposed providing subpoena power to the Committee on Health to investigate Veritas, a politically connected DC contractor charged with management of the United Medical Center. Concerns about patient safety and charges of mismanagement at UMC prompted the inquiry. The CEO of Veritas donated $6,000 to Brandon Todd's campaign.

Todd was one of the council members who overturned the raise of the minimum wage for tipped workers that voters passed in a 2018 ballot but which the council repealed before it went into effect, and this would become a significant issue in his 2020 defeat in the democratic primary.

=== Campaign finance controversy ===
As a result of an audit of his 2015 campaign in April 2017, Todd was fined $5,100 by the Office of Campaign Finance, which he paid in-full.

After Todd's 2015 special election win, the District government's Office of Campaign Finance (OCF) audited the Todd campaign as part of its regular after-election audit of all campaigns. The audit, completed in early January 2016, discovered that the campaign failed to report more than $34,000 in contributions. The campaign also received more than $69,000 in contributions for which it had no records indicating who made the donation. For reasons which remain unclear, the OCF agreed to keep its preliminary audit confidential until the 2015 Todd special election campaign answered the report's allegations. According to the OCF, the 2015 Todd campaign repeatedly declined to provide it with the information and answers it sought, even as Todd campaigned for a full, four-year term on the council during a hotly contest June 14, 2016, Democratic primary. Todd's 2015 campaign staff said they provided all the information the OCF asked for, but the OCF's "antiquated" technology was unable to accept or integrate the information. OCF found the campaign failed to adequately document another $100,000 in contributions.

Todd won the June 14 primary with 49 percent of the vote, without voters knowing about the report's preliminary findings. His closest challenger, Leon T. Andrews Jr., had 40.8 percent. Todd was unopposed in the general election. Once more, voters remained in the dark about the report's finding.

On April 7, 2017, about 16 months after the preliminary report was issued, The Washington Post made the report's draft findings public.

The Washington Post reported on April 17, 2017, that 136 contributors to Todd's 2016 reelection campaign could not be identified by name. The donors contributed about $18,000 to the 2016 effort. Another 1,200 of the 1,400 contributors to the campaign provided no employer information, as required by law. OCF had previously identified more than $7,000 in contributions to Todd's 2016 campaign which were illegal or questionable under D.C. campaign finance laws, and the Todd campaign returned those donations. However, About $5,000 in donations were over the legal limit of $500 per individual or business. The 2016 reelection campaign accepted these donations, and did not return them. OCF officials said they had previously identified numerous questionable donations and expenditures by the Todd 2016 reelection campaign, but many of these had been resolved and the agency was still in the process of obtaining more information.

=== Post-council career ===
After losing reelection in 2020, it was announced that Todd had taken a position with Washington Gas, as director of corporate public policy. In that role, he leads Washington Gas' external relations strategy and lobbies regulators.

== Personal life ==
Todd lives in the Petworth neighborhood of Ward 4 and attends St. Mary's Episcopal Church. He is single and in 2015 said he was "taking applications for a beautiful wife."

== Election results ==
=== 2015 ===
2015 Council of the District of Columbia, Ward 4, Special election
Party	Candidate	Votes	%
Democratic	Brandon Todd	4,584	43
Democratic	Renee L. Bowser	2,311	21
Democratic	Leon T. Andrews, Jr.	1,613	15
Democratic	Dwayne M. Toliver	1,297	12
Democratic	Ron Austin	185	2
Democratic	Edwin W. Powell	132	1
Democratic	Judi Jones	119	1
Democratic	Acqunetta Anderson	117	1
Democratic	Bobvala Tengen	91	1
Democratic	Gwenellen Corley-Bowman	73	1
Democratic	Douglass Sloan	55	1
Socialist Workers	Glova Scott	53	0
Democratic	Pedro Rubio, Jr.	37	0
Democratic	Write-in	38	0

=== 2016 ===
2016 Council of the District of Columbia, Ward 4, Democratic Primary
Party	Candidate	Votes	%
Democratic	Brandon Todd	8,145	49.33
Democratic	Leon T. Andrews, Jr.	6,738	40.81
Democratic	Ron Austin	574	3.48
Democratic	Calvin H. Gurley	509	3.08

2016 Council of the District of Columbia, Ward 4, General Election
Party	Candidate	Votes	%
Democratic	Brandon Todd	35,100	85.5
	Write-in	1,813	4.42

=== 2020 ===
2020 Council of the District of Columbia, Ward 4, Democratic Primary
Party	Candidate	Votes	%
Democratic	Janeese Lewis George	7,926	54.2%
Democratic	Brandon Todd	6,386	43.7
Democratic	Marlena Edwards	310	2.1
