= Washington City Paper =

Alternative newspaper in Washington, D.C.

The Washington City Paper

- Type: Alternative weekly
- Format: online newspaper
- Owner: Mark Ein
- Editor: Alexa Mills
- Founded: 1981; 45 years ago (as 1981)
- Headquarters: 734 15th St. NW, Suite 400; Washington, D.C., U.S. 20005
- Circulation: 68,059 weekly in 2011
- Website: washingtoncitypaper.com

The Washington City Paper (Note: Originally titled 1981: Washington's Alternative Newspaper and titled the City Paper between 1982–1988, and still informally known by the latter name) is an American alternative weekly newspaper founded in 1981 to serve the Washington, D.C., metropolitan area. The newspaper is focused on local news and arts. In 2006, when the City Paper was a print publication distributed on Thursdays, it had an average circulation of 85,588. It was purchased in 2017 by Mark Ein and became an online-only publication after May 6, 2022.

== History ==
The Washington City Paper was started in 1981 by Russ Smith and Alan Hirsch, the owners of the Baltimore City Paper. For its first year it was called 1981: Washington's Alternative Newspaper. The name was changed to City Paper in January 1982 and in December 1982 Smith and Hirsch sold 80% of it to Chicago Reader, Inc. In 1988, Chicago Reader, Inc. acquired the remaining 20% interest. In July 2007 both the Washington City Paper and the Chicago Reader were sold to the Tampa-based Creative Loafing chain. In 2012, Creative Loafing Atlanta and the Washington City Paper were sold to SouthComm Communications.

Amy Austin, the longtime general manager, was promoted to publisher in 2003. Michael Schaffer was named editor in April 2010, two months after Erik Wemple resigned to run the local startup TBD.

On December 21, 2017, D.C.-area venture capitalist and philanthropist Mark Ein announced that he would buy the City Paper and became the first D.C.-based owner in the paper's history. To ensure the paper's long-term success, Ein created two groups: "Alumni Group" and "Friends of Washington City Paper."

== Defamation lawsuit ==
In 2011, Daniel Snyder, the owner of the Washington Redskins, sued the City Paper for The Cranky Redskins Fan's Guide to Dan Snyder, a November 19, 2010, cover story that portrayed him in a negative light. He and the Simon Wiesenthal Center claimed that the story used antisemitic tropes. Prominent sports journalists, Jewish groups, and Jewish writers published sharp criticism of these claims, calling them "breathtakingly dumb allegation", "almost unbearably stupid", and "so self-evidently lacking in merit".

In an February 2011 editorial, City Paper editors said, "But we at City Paper take accusations of anti-Semitism seriously—in part because many of us are Jewish, including staffers who edited the story and designed the cover. So let us know, Mr. Snyder, when you want to fight the real anti-Semites." Publisher Amy Austin also wrote that the article didn't say that Snyder himself had performed unauthorized switching of long-distance accounts by Snyder Communications and GTE Communications, but that rather his employees had.

Hundreds of loyal readers donated more than $30,000 to a legal defense fund.

In December 2010, Washington, D.C., passed anti-SLAPP legislation. In September 2011 the lawsuit was dropped. David Donovan, the Redskins' former chief operating officer and general counsel, had "threatened an expensive legal battle unless Snyder received a retraction and an apology".

== Contents ==
Front page of the last printed issue of the Washington City Paper: Volume 42, No. 7, May 6, 2022

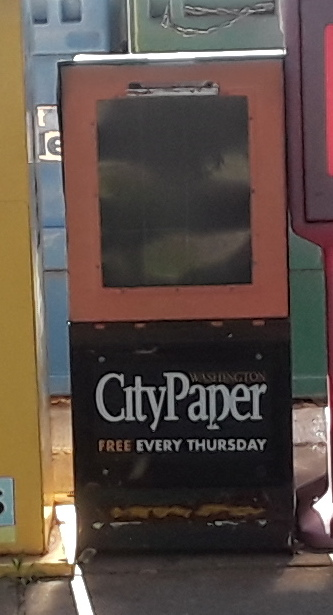
An empty Washington City Paper dispenser at Huntington metro station

Regular City Paper features include:

- a cover feature, 2,500 to 12,000 words in length
- an arts feature, 1,200 to 2,000 words in length
- The District Line, a section of shorter news features about D.C.
- Loose Lips, a news column and blog devoted to D.C. local politics
- Young & Hungry, a food column and blog
- Housing Complex, a real estate column and blog
- Music, theater, film, gallery, and book reviews by various writers
- City Lights, a section comprising critics' events picks.

Also published is one syndicated feature:

- Savage Love, by Dan Savage

== Notable former staffers ==
- David Carr – Former staff writer, The New York Times; author, The Night of the Gun
- Jake Tapper – Chief Washington correspondent, CNN
- Ta-Nehisi Coates – National correspondent, The Atlantic; author, Between the World and Me; MacArthur "Genius" grant recipient
- Katherine Boo – Author, Behind the Beautiful Forevers; MacArthur "Genius" grant recipient
- Erik Wemple – Media critic, The Washington Post
- Jack Shafer – Senior media writer, Politico; former columnist, Reuters; former columnist, Slate
- Amanda Hess – Staff writer, The New York Times; former staff writer, Slate
- Dave McKenna – Staff writer, Deadspin
- David Plotz – CEO, Atlas Obscura; co-host, Slate Political Gabfest; former staff writer, Slate
- Jelani Cobb – Staff writer, The New Yorker
- Clara Jeffery – Editor-in-chief, Mother Jones
- Kara Swisher – Co-founder, Recode
- Jason Cherkis – Reporter, HuffPost
- Neil Drumming – Producer, This American Life
- Amanda Ripley – Journalist and author
- Michael Schaffer – Editor, Washingtonian
- Brett Anderson – Contributing writer, The New York Times; former restaurant critic, The Times-Picayune
- Tom Scocca – Deputy executive editor, Special Projects Desk, Gizmodo Media Group
- Christina Cauterucci – Staff writer, Slate
- Lydia DePillis – Economics reporter, CNNMoney; former economics reporter, Houston Chronicle; former business reporter, The Washington Post
- Jonathan Fischer – Senior editor, Slate
- Josh Levin – Executive editor, Slate
- Jessica Sidman – Food editor, Washingtonian
- Mike DeBonis – Reporter, The Washington Post
- Alan Suderman, Virginia statehouse reporter, Associated Press
- Will Sommer – Reporter, The Daily Beast
- Shani Hilton – Deputy Managing Editor, Los Angeles Times
- Perry Stein – Reporter, The Washington Post
