= Marion Christopher Barry =

American businessman (1980–2016)

- Born: June 17, 1980; Washington, D.C., U.S.
- Died: August 14, 2016 (aged 36); Washington, D.C., U.S.
- Other name: Christopher Barry
- Occupation: Businessman

Marion Christopher Barry (June 17, 1980 – August 14, 2016) was an American construction company owner and the son of Marion Barry, who was a two-time mayor of the District of Columbia long-term District councilmember. After the death of his father, he was an unsuccessful candidate for his father's Ward 8 council seat in 2015.

== Early life ==
Marion Christopher Barry was born in June 1980 to Marion Barry and Barry's third wife, Effi Slaughter Barry. He was their only child. His father had wanted to name him Marion Barry III, but Effi was strongly opposed, and they decided to give him the middle name Christopher instead. For most of his adult life, Barry went by his middle name, Christopher.

He attended both public and private elementary schools in the District of Columbia, Ben W. Murch Elementary and St. Albans School for Boys. He was pulled from St. Albans' after teasing by his classmates about his father's problems with women and drugs. After his parents divorced in 1993, he lived with his mother and attended Jefferson Junior High in Washington, DC. He graduated from Woodrow Wilson High School and briefly attended the University of the District of Columbia. He also attended Hampton University.

In 2015, Barry described his relationship with his father being "more like brothers than father and son." Barry dabbled with drugs and felt his father was unsympathetic to his problems. "Him having struggled with drugs, I would have wished he was there more. But he was more concerned about politics."

Barry formed a noteworthy construction business, Efficiency Contractors LLC, which he named in honor of his mother.

== Legal problems ==
=== Drug arrests ===
In February 2005, three police officers investigated an apartment where there was loud music and which smelled like marijuana. The officers announced their presence several times and, after no response, opened the door. Barry was alone in the apartment, which belonged to a friend. According to a court report, Barry attempted to punch one of the police officers, placed the officer in a headlock, and then punched the officer in the face several times. The officers wrestled Barry to the ground while Barry repeatedly said, "Get out of my house." Barry was arrested and charged with assault of a police officer. In court, he pleaded guilty to a misdemeanor assault charge, acknowledging that he resisted arrest but denying punching or choking a police officer. Barry's plea agreement with prosecutors required that he maintain a job, enroll in school, and not use drugs. In 2006, during a series of drug tests required by his plea agreement, Barry tested positive for marijuana use. He received a warning from a judge.

In July 2011, police officers were flagged down by an individual who said there was fighting and screaming inside Barry's apartment. Police officers reported to the apartment and announced their presence. When Barry refused to open the door, police officers entered the apartment, where they found a half-ounce vial of liquid PCP and five small plastic bags of marijuana. Barry jumped out of the first-floor apartment window and ran, leaving blood on the floor. Barry later returned, was treated for a bleeding foot, and was arrested. Barry claimed he was "self-medicating" with the drugs, and he was sentenced to 18 months of probation. The judge required Barry to undergo drug and grief counseling while on probation.

In August 2013, police officers in Hampton, Virginia stopped Barry for driving erratically. According to court documents, police officers found marijuana on Barry and in the car. Barry was arrested and charged with driving under the influence and possession of marijuana.

In May 2014, Barry was charged with driving while under the influence of alcohol or drugs, and operating a car without a license. A few days later, Barry was arrested for failing to obey a police officer, and the judge suspended his driver's license. Later that month, Barry was arrested for unlawful entry of a residence. Two months later, Barry was arrested for driving with a suspended license. In December 2014, prosecutors accepted a plea bargain to resolve charges related to the two driving incidents, and Barry was sentenced to nine months of probation.

Barry claimed in April 2015 that he beat his drug problems with help from local politician Jim Graham.

At a hearing in June 2015, a judge found that Barry violated the terms of his probation by driving with a revoked license. The judge sentenced Barry to 15 days in jail, to be served during five consecutive weekends beginning in July.

=== Assault charges ===
Marion S. Barry died of cardiac arrest on November 23, 2014, at the age of 78. At his father's memorial service, at the Walter E. Washington Convention Center, Barry memorialized his father and referred to his sometimes difficult relationship with him. He introduced Louis Farrakhan, who in turn blessed the younger Barry. "What a joy to hear his son speak the way his father spoke," Farrakhan said.

On January 13, 2015, Barry attempted to withdraw $20,000 from an account at PNC Bank. A teller declined to process the withdrawal because Barry's account was overdrawn by $2,000. Barry allegedly threatened the bank teller, saying, "I'm going to have someone waiting for you when you get off, you bitch", and destroyed a surveillance camera. Barry was charged with assault, threat of assault, and destruction of property.

Barry pleaded not guilty to the charges, and was ordered to stay away from the bank and the teller. Barry apologized to his followers on Twitter. Prosecutors offered Barry a plea agreement under which the simple assault charge would be dropped if Barry were to plead guilty to the misdemeanor charges of threats and destruction of property and receive up to 360 days of jail time. Barry did not accept the plea offer.

Ultimately, a plea agreement was reached under which Barry pleaded guilty to all three counts and was given a 270-day suspended sentence and 12 months of probation.

Barry continued to blame the bank teller, while pointing to his political legacy and grief over his father's death for the bank incident. "You have people sometimes that take advantage of their positions. I just think that when she sees the name 'Marion Barry,' she for some reason doesn't like me." Thinking back to the event, Barry said, "I don't think I had realized how much I was still mourning."

== Political campaign ==
After his father's death, Barry started referring to himself by his given first name, Marion. On January 5, 2015, Barry announced that he would run for the Council of the District of Columbia representing Ward 8, which his father's death had made vacant. He appeared on the ballot as "Marion C. Barry", and was endorsed by former mayoral candidate Sulaimon Brown and former District Council Member Jim Graham. When the news media asked how he would explain his legal problems to voters, Barry said his experience with drug use made him qualified to help others going through "rough times in life".

In the special election held April 28, 2015, Barry came in sixth place with eight percent of the vote.

== Death ==
Barry died of an apparent drug overdose in the early morning hours of August 14, 2016. A police incident report stated that shortly before Barry suddenly "dropped", he had smoked the synthetic drug K-2 and the hallucinogen PCP. He was found unconscious by his girlfriend and was taken to George Washington University Hospital, where he was pronounced dead at 2:11 am. He was 36 years old. The D.C. coroner's office issued a report in November 2016 that said Barry died after smoking a lethal mixture of the synthetic cannabinoid known as "K2" and PCP.
