= Healthcare in Washington, D.C. =

Washington, D.C. is a national center for patient care and medical research, most notably the National Institutes of Health located just outside the city in Bethesda, Maryland. Washington D.C is home to 10 inpatient hospitals dispersed across the city, in addition to a large number of urgent care clinics, outpatient speciality clinics, pediatric medical centers, psychiatric medical centers, acute long term care facilities, and surgery centers.

There are large health inequities across the district. Hospital access varies by neighborhood and health outcomes are different depending on the region of DC one resides in. This is partly due to the history of segregation of the ward system itself, as well as varying hospital access, food insecurity, and the opioid epidemic, all of which were exacerbated by the COVID-19 pandemic. These health inequities across the city are leading to health disparities by race, gender, and socioeconomic status.

== Contributing factors to health inequities in D.C. ==
=== History of segregation of D.C.'s wards ===
Washington, D.C. is zoned into eight wards. Several historical policies have caused urban segregation, which has caused significant inequities amongst the wards. The Housing Act of 1949 allowed cities to revitalize their housing by removing any substandard housing while building new housing establishments. However, this was used as an excuse to remove underserved neighborhoods with primarily black communities and displacing them and creating new constructions for the federal government. Due to racial segregation practices, African Americans faced housing shortages due to their inability to live in certain areas, with public housing for blacks only allowed to exist outside white neighborhoods. The projects that arose from these programs led to those neighborhoods becoming predominantly black and low-income, ones with little to no resources and lacking access to things like grocery stores. Barry Farm, the first public housing project, was soon subject to neglect due to the lack of response in maintaining the area, widening the disparity.

The GI Bill was created to help WWII veterans, and one of the benefits included low-interest rates and mortgages. This only benefited white veterans, while black veterans weren’t given any financial assistance and were refused loans to owners in black neighborhoods, leading to economic decline in these areas. Home Owner’s Loan Corporation created maps based on racial and economic demographics, and minorities were unable to receive assistance to fund housing in affluent neighborhoods, leading to effective redlining practices due to those populations having to live in the lowest grade areas. These historically inherent discriminatory policies against minorities led to the significant differences seen between the eight wards in health and economic outcomes, with varying access to healthcare, nutrition, and financial opportunities.

=== Disparities in health outcomes ===
Drastic health disparities exist within D.C.’s ward system, with residents in the predominately Black wards 7 and 8 being historically underserved by public institutions and health facilities and experiencing worse health outcomes compared to residents in predominately White wards, like ward 3. Analysis of a race breakdown within D.C.’s ward system reveals that 92% of residents in wards 7 and 8 are Black, whereas only 5% of residents in ward 3 are Black. When looking at indicators of health and wellbeing of a populations, it becomes clear that the predominately Black wards 7 and 8 experiences worse health outcomes than compared to predominately white wards. For instance, life expectancy in Wards 8 and 7 is significantly lower, at 71.7 and 72.1 years respectively, compared to 87 years in Ward 3. Residents in wards with higher population of Black individuals, specifically Wards 5, 7, and 8, are more likely to be hospitalized for preventable health issues. Additionally, the death rate due to heart disease in Ward 8 is four times higher than in Ward 3. Moreover, the infant mortality rate in Black infants, which is a commonly recognized measure of the health and wellbeing of a population, is more than four times higher than White infants, with the highest rates of Black infant mortality being in Ward 8 (14/1,000), Ward 7 (9.3/1,000) and Ward 5 (9.2/1,000), all of which are predominately Black wards. These outcomes highlight the systemic racial inequalities that exist within the different wards in D.C. and how these inequalities manifest via poorer health outcomes.

=== Hospital access ===
Discrepancy in access to healthcare across DC’s wards are a major contributor to differences in health outcomes. Lack of reliable, convenient, and trustworthy healthcare facilities cause delays in care, lack of treatment altogether, and inconvenient care further multiplied by other social determinants of health such as access to transportation, getting time off of work, access to childcare, healthcare costs, and structural racism in healthcare.

Wards 7 and 8, located east of the Anacostia River, are home to neighborhoods such as Anacostia, Congress Heights, Deanwood, and Bellevue and are known for being the least affluent neighborhoods of DC with the highest levels of poverty, unemployment, and crime. Wards 7 and 8 face child poverty levels of 47%. The median household income of Ward 8 is $31,000 and the unemployment rate is 12%. Wards 7 and 8 have the poorest health outcomes in the district, complicated by its very restricted access to healthcare, opposed to all other wards with only one hospital in the region. United Medical Center, located at 1310 Southern Ave SE, has been the only hospital in the region since 1966 and became a part of the government of the District of Columbia in 2010. UMC has faced issues of poor quality care, sanitation concerns, mismanagement of employees, and financial discrepancies for over 60 years. As the only hospital east of the Anacostia River, residents of the region do not have any other options, except to travel outside of the area - an inaccessible, inconvenient, expensive, and timely travel for many residents. In 2017, UMC was forced to close its maternity ward due to high reports of dangerous errors. Wards 7 and 8 have not had a maternity unit in the area since, and patients must travel west of the river to get to a hospital with a labor and delivery unit. And the first urgent care in the region, Unity Health Care, was only opened in 2022 as a way to further access to 24/7 outpatient care that didn’t require a trip to the emergency room.

United Medical Center is set to close its doors permanently on April 15, 2025, laying off 485 employees, due to its mismanagement and poor quality healthcare. Cedar Hill Medical Center will open up in its place on the same day. Cedar Hill Medical Center is a brand new community health care center and non profit organization with 136 beds and was built as a way to better address health care disparities in Wards 7 and 8, according to DC’s governor, Muriel Bowser. CHMC is located at 1200 Pecan St. SE and is accessible by metrorail at the Congress Heights stops and by metrobus. This will be the first trauma center located east of the Anacostia River. Outpatient services will include family medicine, general medicine, cardiology, pulmonology, nephrology, oncology, hematology, neurology, endocrinology, gastroenterology, rheumatology, treatment for infectious diseases, palliative care, geriatrics, dermatology, an ENT clinic, urology, gynecology and obstetric. Children’s National will additionally open an emergency department, neonatal intensive care unit, and nursery at CMHC.

On the other end of the spectrum, located in the northwest quadrants of DC, Wards 2 and 3 is the most affluent section of DC and is home to neighborhoods such as Georgetown, Logan Circle, Tenleytown, and Chevy Chase. These wards are disproportionately white, at 65% and 77%. Additionally Ward 2 has a median household income of $122,000, child poverty rate of 4%, and unemployment rate of 3.2%. These vast disparities are also reflected in healthcare outcomes across the district. This region of DC is home to Medstar Georgetown University Hospital, a 609 bed facility that additionally includes The Lombardi Comprehensive Cancer Center that includes outpatient cancer services. George Washington University Hospital is located in this region as well and is 395 bed facility and Level 1 Trauma Center. Sibley Memorial Hospital, located in The Palisades of Ward 3, is an additional 245 bed facility in the area. These 3 hospitals are all within 5 miles of each other and serve residents of Wards 2 and 3. Health outcomes are significantly better in these two wards partially because of the increased access to hospital care which includes all specialities. These facilities are close by, convenient, and accessible for almost all residents and that is reflected in better health outcomes than other, less affluent areas of DC.

Located in Ward 5 of north east DC is Medstar Washington Hospital Center, the National Rehabilitation Hospital, and Children's National Medical Center. Ward 5 is home to neighborhoods such as Truxton Circle, Edgewood, Bloomingdale's, and Fort Totten. Ward 5 is 58% black and 25% white with a median household income of $97,814. Additionally, 14.7% of Ward 5's population is living below the poverty line. These three hospitals are located near each other between Irving Street NW and Michigan Ave NW. Washington Hospital Center is the largest adult care hospital with 926 beds and is also home to Washington Cancer Institute - the largest cancer care provider in DC. Children's National Medical Center - ranked top 10 in the nation - is the only health care provider for children in the district. CNMC treats about 300,000 pediatric patients per year and includes a wide variety of speciality care units to treat patients from around the world. CNMC includes the Children's National Heart Center, Cancer and Blood Disorders Center, Joseph E. Robert, Jr., Center for Surgical Care, Rare Disease Institute, Neuroscience and Behavioral Medicine Center, and the Center for Hospital-Based Specialties. These three facilities are accessible my metrorail at the Brookland/Catholic University of America stop on the red line or by a number of metrobus stops.

Ward 1 is home to Howard University Hospital and is located in central Washington, DC on the Howard University Campus. Ward 1 includes neighborhoods such as Adams Morgan, Columbia Heights, Mount Pleasant, and Park View. Ward 1 is predominately white at 46% with other demographics at 22% Hispanic and 20% Black. Howard University Hospital was opened in 1862 and is a 300 bed facility with a Level 1 Trauma Center serving residents of Ward 5 and neighboring areas.

=== Food access inequality ===
Food insecurity is the lack of access to affordable, nutritious food. Multiple studies have found linkages between food insecurity and worsened health outcomes and heightened healthcare costs. The number of food-insecure households dramatically increased during the COVID-19 pandemic. This problem is exacerbated in Washington D.C., where wards 5, 7, and 8, wards with a large African American population that face poverty, are disproportionately affected by food insecurity and are deemed as a healthy food priority. Wards 7 and 8 have three grocery stores to cater to over 150,000 individuals. Meanwhile, Ward 6, where the average household income is above $79,401, has eleven grocery stores.

Children impacted by food insecurity can experience detrimental effects on their development. They are more likely to be hospitalized and at higher risk for chronic diseases such as obesity due to unhealthy diets. Wards 7 and 8 have recently started to be described as food swamps, areas with large amounts of unhealthy food options such as fast foods and convenience stores that don’t have fresh, nutritious meals. There are government programs like the Supplemental Nutrition Assistance Program to help food-insecure individuals. However, due to the lack of grocery stores, access to healthy foods is still limited as many of them can’t afford to go to locations to obtain food.

Every ten years, the ward boundaries are updated, and recently they increased the area considered Ward 8, inflating the number of grocery stores by two. However, those are across the river and still inaccessible for these impacted communities. Another disparity limiting access to nutritious food options is the lack of walkability and access to public transportation in the lower socioeconomic wards. Wards 7 and 8 have less bus stops and metro stations, increasing the time it takes to travel to other wards to gain access to healthy food. This leads to these communities to rely on local convenience stores as their primary source of meals, which are not sufficient to obtain all the nutrients individuals require to be in good health.

=== The opioid crisis in D.C. ===
Washington, D.C. is witness to one of the most severe opioid crises in the United States showcased by a disproportionate impact on its Black population. The narrative surrounding the larger United States tends to associate opioid-related harm with rural and suburban White communities. However, the crisis in D.C. has been seen to primarily affect older Black men, reflecting a combination of structural inequities, policy failures, and systemic barriers to healthcare access that have exacerbated health disparities in the city.

Black residents make up roughly 45% of D.C.'s population while being responsible for 85% of opioid-related overdose deaths according to the Office of Chief Medical Examiner (OCME). The most severely impacted areas were Wards 7 and 8 - predominantly Black areas. This highlights the racial disparities that are consequences of lower access to quality healthcare and social services. D.C. also provided the largest disparity in opioid overdose deaths between Black and White people in 2022. Out of all states and territories in the United States, this racial inequality was said to be the biggest. It is not just one factor contributing that contributes to these racial disparities. At the start of the opioid crisis, healthcare officials were prescribing pain medication like OxyContin all over the country. One key factor to note is that Black patients were much less likely to be prescribed these painkillers. The why comes down to racial biases and disparities in healthcare. Historically, it was believed that Black patients had higher a higher pain tolerance, so they didn't need opioids to be relieved. At first, this limited the exposure to opioids for the Black community. This limited exposure was not coming from a stance of protection - but rather discrimination rooted in historical beliefs. As the crisis shifted from painkillers and prescription meds to illegal opioids, the Black communities were hit even harder. It is cited that poverty, unstable housing, the lack of early intervention, and limited healthcare access left Black residents much more vulnerable to addiction. A study found that overdose rates among Black residents in D.C. were four to six times higher than among White residents.

The opioid epidemic cannot be separated from the United States' long history of racism throughout the healthcare system. Black and other marginalized communities have faced neglect, medical experimentation, and inequitable access to care which has set the precedent for the disparities we see in the opioid crisis. Politics have shaped societal stereotypes that promote Black drug users as criminals. Contrast that with the stereotypes of White drug users - which people believe need treatment - we see the influence policies have on funding to media coverage. Thus, this racial gap has ethical implications, calling on local governments to provide support. D.C. launched a plan in December 2018 to fight the opioid epidemic that disproportionately affects Black communities, called "LIVE. LONG. DC". They primarily attempted to do this by implementing a community-centered approach. They wanted to educate residents about the risks of opioid use backed up by statistics through school programs. Additional education included training healthcare providers and first responders to more effectively prevent, identify, and treat opioid use disorder. Along with these preventative measures, they tried to strengthen the legislative framework that would support responses and enhance surveillance on trends and outcomes of the opioid crisis. Their last strategy was in regard to the criminal justice system and providing better treatment options for those already in the justice system. This was aimed at decreasing the incarceration rates that were seen to impact minority communities.

These efforts did expand peer support services, increase naloxone distribution, and implement real-time overdose tracking systems, but opioid-related deaths continued to rise. There was a 12% increase in opioid-related overdoses from 2022-2023, calling for an updated plan that expanded upon LIVE. LONG. DC. This new plan launched in January 2024, incorporating new strategies that emphasized equity and addressed emerging needs, such as improving medication-assisted treatment, and expanding harm reduction services in underserved neighborhoods. To address racial disparities, this new plan promotes equity as a central theme. One of the primary goals is to reduce opioid-related harm, specifically in Wards 7 and 8 which are predominantly Black communities and where overdose rates are the highest. Along with this, they implemented place-based interventions. These target neighborhoods with the highest overdose rates, which generally are Black communities. They prioritize these areas by expanding harm reduction services, treatment access, and community engagement. Addressing the opioid crisis in D.C. requires a long-term commitment to equity, accountability, and community-building, which have historically been excluded. As they continue to develop and implement updated strategies, they hope to see continued success in reducing overdose deaths, but also creating a more inclusive health system that includes all communities. D.C.'s response is centered in racial equity which allows them to become a national model for addressing health disparities.

=== COVID-19 in D.C. ===
The COVID-19 pandemic revealed and intensified long-standing racial and socioeconomic health disparities in Washington, D.C. These inequities were most pronounced among the city’s Black population, which makes up approximately 45% of the overall population but accounted for 75% of all COVID-19-related deaths in the city. This 30-percentage-point disparity represents the largest gap between the proportion of Black residents and their share of COVID-19 deaths among all U.S. states and territories. These racial disparities also aligned with geographic divisions in the city. Wards 7 and 8 have the highest percentages of Black residents—both over 92%—and some of the city's highest Area Deprivation Index (ADI) scores, indicating greater social and economic disadvantage. These wards also had higher initial transmission rates of COVID-19 and significantly lower vaccination rates during the rollout of the vaccine. In contrast, Ward 3, located in Northwest D.C. and predominantly White (approximately 81.5%), had the lowest ADI score (3.4) and the highest vaccination rates in the city.

By March 2021, only 3.9% of residents in Ward 8 were fully vaccinated, compared to 12.2% in Ward 3. The mortality rate in Ward 8 was also the highest in the city, at 2.3 deaths per thousand people, whereas Ward 3 had the lowest, at 0.7 per thousand. This unequal distribution of vaccine access and outcomes reflected differences in digital literacy, internet access, transportation availability, and trust in healthcare institutions. Underlying these disparities were broader social determinants of health. According to a 2022 analysis by the Kaiser Family Foundation, Black and Hispanic residents in the United States reported greater difficulty meeting basic needs during the pandemic. In March 2022, about 74.4% of Black adults and 75.2% of Hispanic adults reported struggling with household expenses, compared to 55.5% of White adults. Food shortage was reported by 20.4% of Black adults and 16.2% of Hispanic adults, more than double the 7.1% reported by White adults. Black and Hispanic respondents were also more likely to report loss of employment income and uncertainty about meeting housing payments.

Pre-existing health conditions also contributed to more severe outcomes from COVID-19. African Americans in D.C., as in many other parts of the country, are more likely to experience chronic illnesses such as hypertension, diabetes, and obesity—conditions associated with a higher risk of complications from COVID-19.

== See also ==
- Lead contamination in Washington, D.C. drinking water
