= Cedar Hill Regional Medical Center =

Hospital in Washington, D.C.

- Universal Health Services
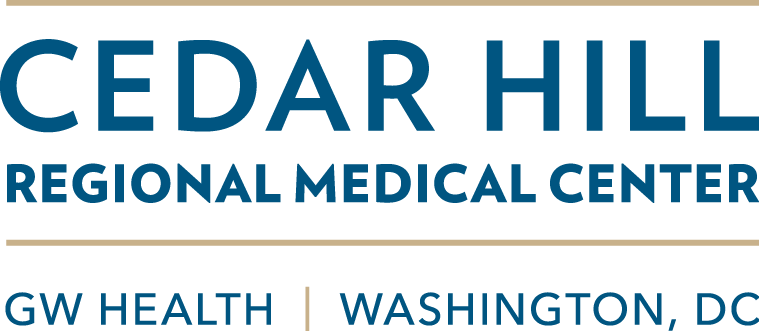

- Location within the District of Columbia

Geography
- Location: 1200 Pecan St SE, Washington, D.C., United States
- Coordinates: 38.85102°N 76.99422°W

Services
- Beds: 136

Links
- Website: cedarhillregional.com
- Lists: Hospitals in Washington, D.C.

Cedar Hill Regional Medical Center GW Health is a 136-bed hospital in Southeast Washington, D.C. It is owned and managed by GW Health, which owns and operates GWU Hospital. Children's National Hospital cares for pediatric patients in the emergency department and runs the six-bed neonatal intensive care unit at Cedar Hill. GW Health is part of Universal Health Services, a for-profit hospital company.

Cedar Hill opened on April 15, 2025 and replaced United Medical Center. It is located on the campus of St. Elizabeth's Hospital near the Congress Heights neighborhood of Ward 8.

The $434 million hospital started construction in 2022, funded by the District of Columbia government. The majority Black, largely impoverished neighborhoods east of the Anacostia River have long been poorly served by health services. Cedar Hill is the only full-service hospital east of the Anacostia. It has the capacity to expand to 184 beds.

== History ==
Discussions and planning for a new hospital in Southeast D.C. started shortly after District of Columbia General Hospital, a public hospital, closed in 2001 due to poor city finances. D.C. General's closing left United Medical Center as the only hospital in Southeast.

An early proposal came in 2002. It would have been a privately financed hospital on the D.C. General site in Hill East, near RFK Stadium. That proposal never materialized; D.C. General was eventually turned into a homeless shelter, which itself was closed in 2018, and the building was demolished.

In later years, city officials proposed at least some level of government financing for a new hospital. By 2006, city leaders had settled on about $400 million in public financing for a hospital at the St. Elizabeth's site (a psychiatric hospital that has been significant downsized) to be operated by a private entity such as Howard University Hospital. Those proposals were not enacted.

What became Cedar Hill was first proposed in 2014 by Mayor Vincent Gray. The hospital at St. Elizabeth's was estimated to cost $300 million and would replace United Medical Center, which by then had been taken over by the district government. While initially rejected by the D.C. Council, Mayor Muriel Bowser later endorsed the idea. In 2018, Bowser signed an agreement with GW Health to operate the facility.

The city and GW Health broke ground on the hospital in 2022 and gave it the Cedar Hill name. The name is an homage to the nearby former home of abolitionist Frederick Douglass, now preserved as the Frederick Douglass National Historic Site.
