= Washington Hospital =

Washington Hospital may refer to:

- Hospitals in Washington (state)
- Hospitals in Washington, D.C.
- Mary Washington Hospital, A hospital in Fredericksburg, Virginia
- MedStar Washington Hospital Center, A hospital in Washington, DC
- Washington Hospital Healthcare System, A hospital in Fremont, CA
