= Healthcare in Washington =

Healthcare in Washington may refer to:

- Healthcare in Washington (state)
- Healthcare in Washington, D.C.
