= Roberta L. DeBiasi =

Professor of tropical medicine

Roberta Lynn DeBiasi is head of the Division of Pediatric Diseases and Co-Director of the Congenital Zika Program at Children's National Hospital in Washington D.C. She is also principal investigator at the Center for Translational Research at Children's National Research Institute and professor of pediatrics and microbiology, immunology and tropical medicine at George Washington University School of Medicine & Health Sciences.

An alumna of Boston University (1988), she earned an M.D. from the University of Virginia School of Medicine (1992).
