= Sandra M. Swain =

American oncologist

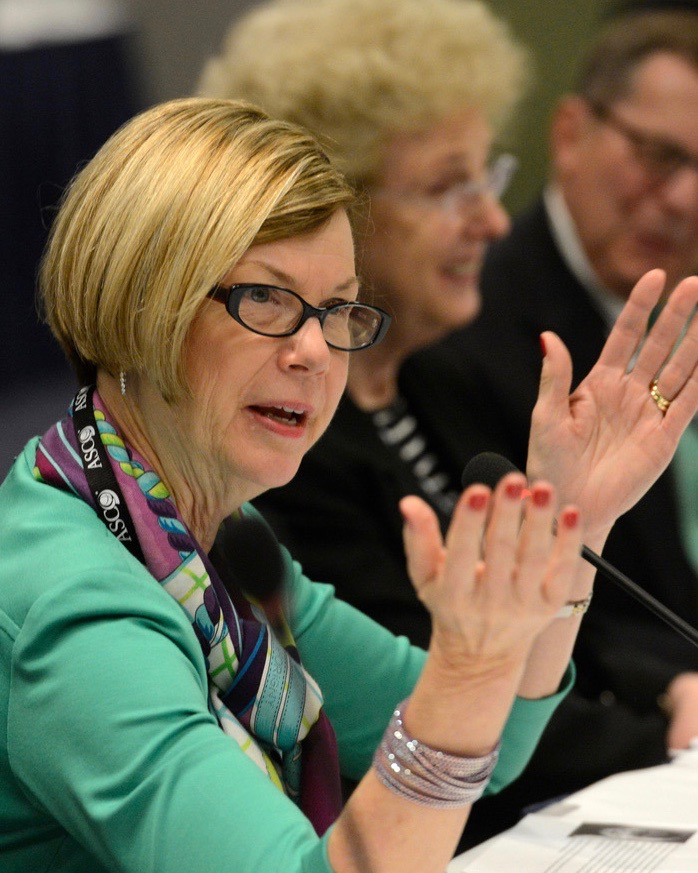
- Swain at ASCO 2013 Annual Meeting in Chicago, IL
- Born: 1954 (age 71–72)
- Education: University of North Carolina at Chapel Hill (B.A.); University of Florida (M.D.)
- Occupations: Oncologist, clinical breast cancer researcher
- Years active: 1980–present

Sandra M. Swain (born 1954) is an American oncologist, breast cancer specialist and clinical translational researcher. She is currently a professor of Medicine at the Georgetown University School of Medicine and the Associate Dean for Research Development at Georgetown University Medical Center (GUMC) and MedStar Health as well as an adjunct professor of Medicine at the F. Edward Hébert School of Medicine of the Uniformed Services University of Health Sciences. She is also a past President of the American Society of Clinical Oncology (ASCO), serving from 2012 through 2013.

The focus of Sandra's research includes clinical trials and translational research in metastatic and inflammatory breast cancer, adjuvant treatment of breast cancer, the treatments of metastatic HER2+ breast cancer, cardiotoxicity, as well as health care disparities.^{,}^{,} She has authored more than 275 articles on her research in multiple medical journals, including the New England Journal of Medicine (NEJM), The Lancet Oncology and the Journal of Clinical Oncology (JCO). In addition, she has been interviewed in The New York Times and The Wall Street Journal, as well as on NPR's Weekend Edition Sunday and the PBS NewsHour.

== Career ==
After completing her fellowship at the NCI and running clinical trials for two years under Dr. Marc Lippman and alongside Dr. Robert Dickson, Swain founded the breast cancer program at Georgetown University's Lombardi Comprehensive Cancer Center (LCCC) in 1988. This program is now known as the Betty Lou Ourisman Breast Health Center. She returned to the NCI in 1995 and, by 1999, became a Tenured Principal Investigator and the Deputy Chief of the Medicine Branch within the Division of Clinical Sciences, ultimately becoming Chief of the Cancer Therapeutics Branch at the Center for Cancer Research.

In 2007, after a 12-year stint at the NCI, Swain accepted the position of Medical Director at the Washington Cancer Institute (WCI) at the MedStar Washington Hospital Center (MWHC).^{,} At this time, Swain had a growing interest in healthcare inequality and a desire to dedicate her efforts to the underserved African American community in Washington, D.C. During her time as medical director at the WCI, she studied the causes of increased breast cancer mortality observed in African American women. In 2016, after almost a decade at the WCI, Swain was appointed as the Associate Dean for Research Development to pursue research collaborations, business development, and funding opportunities between Georgetown University and industry, medical/scientific associations, governmental agencies, and other entities at all levels.

Over the past 35 years, Swain has held advisory and leadership positions with professional oncology societies and organizations. These include Susan G. Komen for the Cure, the American Society of Clinical Oncology, the Conquer Cancer Foundation, the National Surgical Adjuvant Breast and Bowel Project (NSABP), and the National Accreditation Program for Breast Centers. Swain is a national past-President of the American Society of Clinical Oncology (ASCO) serving from 2012 through 2013.^{,}^{,}^{,} She currently serves as the Secretary for ASCO's Conquer Cancer Foundation.

== Bibliography ==
- Sandra M. Swain, Jose Baselga, Sung-Bae Kim, Jungsil Ro, Vladimir Semiglazov, Mario Campone, Eva Ciruelos, Jean-Marc Ferrero, Andreas Schneeweiss, Sarah Heeson, Emma Clark, Graham Ross, Mark C. Benyunes & Javier Cortes (2015). "Pertuzumab, trastuzumab, and docetaxel in HER2-positive metastatic breast cancer". The New England Journal of Medicine. 372 (8): 724–734. doi:10.1056/NEJMoa1413513. PMC 5584549. PMID 25693012.
- Jose Baselga, Javier Cortes, Sung-Bae Kim, Seock-Ah Im, Roberto Hegg, Young-Hyuck Im, Laslo Roman, Jose Luiz Pedrini, Tadeusz Pienkowski, Adam Knott, Emma Clark, Mark C. Benyunes, Graham Ross & Sandra M. Swain (2012). "Pertuzumab plus trastuzumab plus docetaxel for metastatic breast cancer". The New England Journal of Medicine. 366 (2): 109–119. doi:10.1056/NEJMoa1113216. PMC 5705202. PMID 22149875.
- Sandra M. Swain, Jong-Hyeon Jeong, Charles E. Jr Geyer, Joseph P. Costantino, Eduardo R. Pajon, Louis Fehrenbacher, James N. Atkins, Jonathan Polikoff, Victor G. Vogel, John K. Erban, Priya Rastogi, Robert B. Livingston, Edith A. Perez, Eleftherios P. Mamounas, Stephanie R. Land, Patricia A. Ganz & Norman Wolmark (2010). "Longer therapy, iatrogenic amenorrhea, and survival in early breast cancer". The New England Journal of Medicine. 362 (22): 2053–2065. doi:10.1056/NEJMoa0909638. PMC 2935316. PMID 20519679.
- Chia C. Portera, Janice M. Walshe, Douglas R. Rosing, Neelima Denduluri, Arlene W. Berman, Ujala Vatas, Margarita Velarde, Catherine K. Chow, Seth M. Steinberg, Diana Nguyen, Sherry X. Yang & Sandra M. Swain (2008). "Cardiac toxicity and efficacy of trastuzumab combined with pertuzumab in patients with [corrected] human epidermal growth factor receptor 2-positive metastatic breast cancer". Clinical Cancer Research. 14 (9): 2710–2716. doi:10.1158/1078-0432.CCR-07-4636. PMC 4406095. PMID 18451236.
- Edward H. Romond, Edith A. Perez, John Bryant, Vera J. Suman, Charles E. Jr Geyer, Nancy E. Davidson, Elizabeth Tan-Chiu, Silvana Martino, Soonmyung Paik, Peter A. Kaufman, Sandra M. Swain, Thomas M. Pisansky, Louis Fehrenbacher, Leila A. Kutteh, Victor G. Vogel, Daniel W. Visscher, Greg Yothers, Robert B. Jenkins, Ann M. Brown, Shaker R. Dakhil, Eleftherios P. Mamounas, Wilma L. Lingle, Pamela M. Klein, James N. Ingle & Norman Wolmark (2005). "Trastuzumab plus adjuvant chemotherapy for operable HER2-positive breast cancer". The New England Journal of Medicine. 353 (16): 1673–1684. doi:10.1056/NEJMoa052122. PMID 16236738. S2CID 9534884.
- Sandra M. Swain, Fredrick S. Whaley & Michael S. Ewer (2003). "Congestive heart failure in patients treated with doxorubicin: a retrospective analysis of three trials". Cancer. 97 (11): 2869–2879. doi:10.1002/cncr.11407. PMID 12767102. S2CID 37511219.
- Sandra M. Swain, F. S. Whaley, M. C. Gerber, S. Weisberg, M. York, D. Spicer, S. E. Jones, S. Wadler, A. Desai, C. Vogel, J. Speyer, A. Mittelman, S. Reddy, K. Pendergrass, E. Velez-Garcia, M. S. Ewer, J. R. Bianchine & R. A. Gams (1997). "Cardioprotection with dexrazoxane for doxorubicin-containing therapy in advanced breast cancer". Journal of Clinical Oncology. 15 (4): 1318–1332. doi:10.1200/jco.1997.15.4.1318. PMID 9193323.
- S. M. Swain, F. S. Whaley, M. C. Gerber, M. S. Ewer, J. R. Bianchine & R. A. Gams (1997). "Delayed administration of dexrazoxane provides cardioprotection for patients with advanced breast cancer treated with doxorubicin-containing therapy". Journal of Clinical Oncology. 15 (4): 1333–1340. doi:10.1200/jco.1997.15.4.1333. PMID 9193324.
