= List of hospitals in Washington =

List of hospitals in Washington may refer to:

- List of hospitals in Washington (state)
- List of hospitals in Washington, D.C.
