= Corbett Price =

American political donor

- Born: 1950 or 1951 (age 75–76); United States
- Education: Ohio State University
- Occupations: Businessman, political donor, health care consultant
- Years active: 1985–present
- Known for: Purported to improve health care services and operations
- Spouse: Chrystie Boucree (second wife)
- Children: 4

Corbett Price (born 1950 or 1951) is an American businessman and political donor.

Since the 1980s, Price has formed businesses that purported to improve health care services and operations. His endeavors have billed millions of dollars in expenses to local governments while his firms have been removed from multiple contracts after financial instability.

== Early life and education ==
Price was born circa 1950 in the United States, and earned a master's degree from Ohio State University.

== Career ==
Price founded and operated various companies involved in health care management. He was CEO of Quantix Health Capital, LLC, a health care financial advisory firm. He also is CEO of Kurron Capital, LLC, a health care private equity firm, and is the founder and chairman of Kurron & Co. Inc., a management consulting firm for health care. Price also was a senior executive at HCA Healthcare and chairman and CEO of Health Risk Management.

=== Dimensions Healthcare ===
In 1985, Price was working at Dimensions Healthcare System as a consultant, earning over $1.2 million a year. Charged with improving the ailing Prince George Hospital Center, Price laid off 650 people. Later, to reduce consulting fees, Price became CEO of the hospital. In 1990, the board bought out the remainder three years of his contract, only months after hiring him.

In 2003, Price and a group of investors tried unsuccessfully to buy the hospital. In 2007, Price renewed ties with Dimensions when he successfully won a bid to manage the financial system. Price presented himself as an advisor to Manitum Corporation, a business run by his son.

=== Kurron Shares of America ===
In 1990, Price started Kurron Shares of America. Within years and after leveraging political ties to Bill Thompson, who was on Kurron's board, Price became CEO of Interfaith Medical Center a hospital serving Brooklyn's poorest neighborhoods. He was splitting time between two full-time hospital CEO jobs yielding an estimated $1.5 million in pay a year, as well as private consulting projects, including a $600,000 contract to conduct a financial analysis of D.C. General Hospital. Under Kurron's management, Interfaith was bankrupted. Price and Kurron managed to secure another contract to manage the bankruptcy restructuring.

Local 1199 and the New York State Nursing Association filed objections to Kurron's contract, charging that Price did not even visit the hospitals where he was listed as CEO and that he was a shadow manager. In 2013, the New York State Department of Health canceled Kurron's contract, citing illegal bonuses and operations that were chaotic, and barred it from managing the hospital.

Another contract held by Kurron to provide services to the Government of Bermuda was terminated after the government found that the contract spent exorbitant amounts on consultant fees. After Kurron won the five-year $13.5 million over Johns Hopkins University, the friendship between Price and former Bermuda premier Ewart Brown was cited as an explanation. Ultimately, the hospital Kurron was charged with turning around had to close its continuing care unit.

=== Veritas ===
Price tried to downplay his involvement with Veritas, a company founded in D.C., where his family had roots. He took the title of Senior Advisor, while he installed his wife, Chrystie Boucree, as Veritas president. Boucree then brought on her cousin, David. After making substantial contributions to the Mayor's campaign, Veritas was awarded a contract valued at $5 million to manage United Medical Center, D.C.'s only publicly owned hospital.

While receiving more than $800,000 monthly to manage the hospital, Veritas failed to improve the quality of care. Under Veritas management there were several cases of preventable patient deaths and negligence. One patient died on the floor of the hospital in his own excrement and the body of another dead patient could not be located. The only obstetrics ward east of the Anacostia river was closed by regulators because it could not meet minimum standards. In 2018, following a close vote in the D.C. Council, a new management firm was selected.

== Other activities ==
In 2016, Price was appointed by Muriel Bowser as one of the 16 directors on the board of the Washington Metropolitan Area Transit Authority. Though he had no significant experience in public transportation, Price had previously donated $2,000 to Bowser's mayoral campaign, $10,000 to her inaugural fund, and $35,000 to the mayor's campaign though family and companies. After the WMATA ethics committee found significant violations committed by his fellow D.C. board representative, Councilmember Jack Evans, Price lied to the public about the findings. To keep the findings from public view, Price angrily pressured WMATA counsel.

Faced with calls for his resignation, Price claimed that scrutiny over his actions was discouraging professionals from entering public service. Faced with the threat of an ethics investigation into his actions, Price announced his resignation from the board on August 30, 2019.

== Personal life ==
Price is the father of two adult sons. He and his wife Chrystie Boucree have two young daughters.
