= Disappearance of Arianna Fitts =

2016 event in San Francisco, California, US

Arianna Fitts
- Born: September 6, 2013 (age 12); California, US
- Disappeared: April 5, 2016 (aged 2); Oakland, California US
- Status: Missing for 10 years, 4 months and 26 days
- Height: 2 ft 0 in (0.61 m)
- Mother: Nicole Fitts (deceased)
- Website: ariannafitts.com

Arianna Fitts (born September 6, 2013) is an American child missing since 2016. Arianna and her mother, Nicole Fitts (then aged 32), were reported missing on April 5, 2016, in San Francisco, California. Nicole was last seen on April 1, 2016, and Arianna has not been seen since mid-February 2016. Arianna is still missing, while her mother's body was discovered buried in McLaren Park on April 8, 2016.

== Background ==
Locations
1 Best Buy, Harrison Street where Nicole Fitts worked.
2 John McLaren Park where Nicole Fitts' remains were discovered.

Both mother and daughter have ties to San Mateo, Oakland, Fresno, Santa Cruz and Silicon Valley and regularly visited Southern California.

Family members of the Fitts’ alerted San Francisco Police on April 5, 2016, that Nicole and Arianna Fitts were missing and Nicole Fitts was last seen on April 1 after receiving a phone call to meet her daughter's babysitter. She was believed to have traveled from her job at a Best Buy store on Harrison Street via a Municipal Railway Vehicle on the Third Street Corridor around 9:45 pm, wearing a blue Best Buy shirt, however, it appears she traveled from her newly established residence in San Francisco. Her daughter Arianna, was last seen in late February in Oakland, California.

On April 8, a gardener in the John McLaren Park discovered a large piece of wood resting behind a clump of ivy covered bushes with an odd silver character painted on it. Underneath the wood, the body of Nicole Fitts was discovered in a fetal position, in an uncovered, but previously covered by the wood, shallow grave. After her body was discovered, police focused their attention on the individuals who watched Arianna while her mother commuted 2 hours to go to work.

== Search for the missing child ==
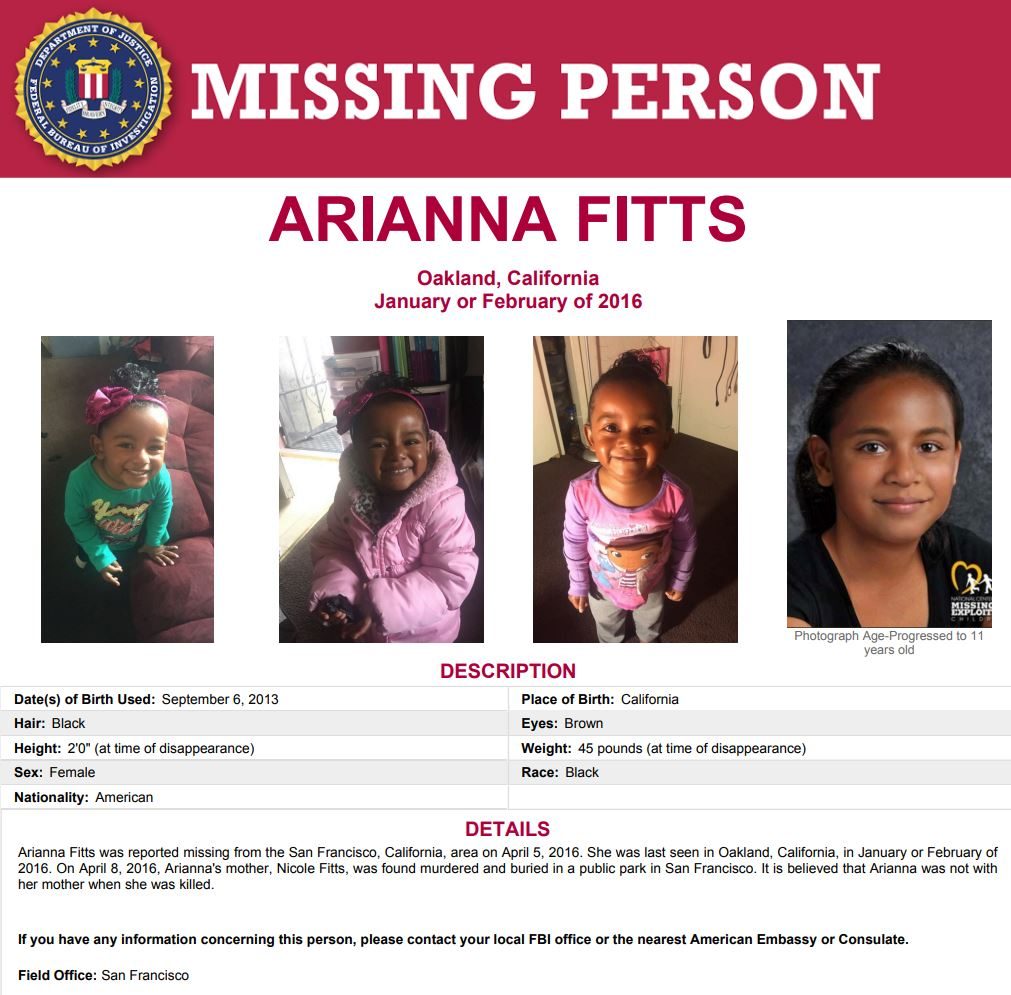
Arianna Fitts FBI Missing poster

Efforts are ongoing to locate the missing toddler. The police investigated homes in Emeryville, Oakland, and Daly City, California and cited that those who had last seen Fitts were uncooperative with the initial interview process. Police identified three people of interest at a press conference, who were named as Helena and Devin Martin and Siolo Hearne. The sisters of Nicole Fitts told media outlets that they still believe that Arianna is alive, and one told reporters that she believed; "Someone wanted Arianna as their own [child]."

The family created a website to highlight the search, and offered a US$10,000 reward to anyone with information that may help them locate Arianna and her safe return. Best Buy also offered a US$10,000 reward for direct information regarding Arianna. In 2021, police raised the reward for information about Arianna to US$100,000. In 2022, San Francisco and the FBI announced the increase of the reward for leads to $250,000. There are several established tiplines to report tips and remain anonymous that are listed on the website the family created.

In April 2021 San Francisco Police released a rendering of a forensic sketch of Arianna that had been age progressed to 7-years-old, along with two crime bulletins to the public.

In December 2024, the Federal Bureau of Investigation put up billboards in Las Vegas Valley seeking to raise awareness of Fitts' case with local residents. The agency has listed Fitts as one of their most wanted missing persons.

== Media depictions ==
In February 2020, her case was profiled on crime podcast The Vanished. The Vanished is a podcast featuring missing people and their cases. The case was also profiled on another crime podcast Inside the FBI in June 2021 and the podcast was promoted on the FBI's Twitter page in an effort to reach more people who could help in the case. In November 2022, the Crime Junkie podcast profiled this case.

== See also ==
- List of people who disappeared mysteriously: post-1970
- Disappearance of Myra Lewis, another 2-year-old child who went missing in 2014
