= United Medical Center =

Public hospital in Washington, D.C.

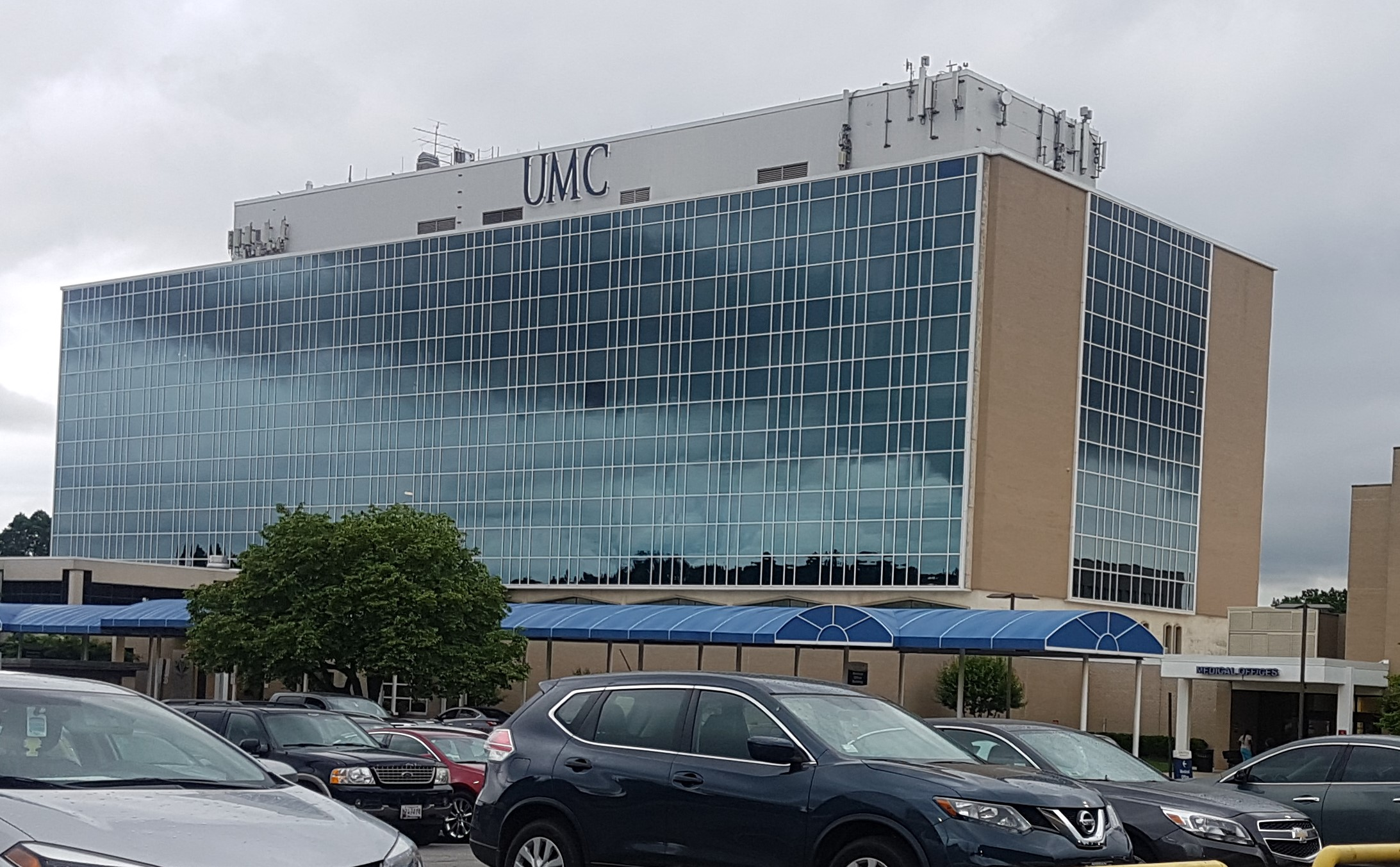
- United Medical Center in 2018

Geography
- Location: 1310 Southern Avenue SE, Washington, D.C., United States
- Coordinates: 38.835696°N 76.984499°W

Organization
- Type: Public

Services
- Emergency department: Level II trauma center
- Beds: 330

History
- Opened: 1966

Links
- Website: unitedmedicaldc.com
- Lists: Hospitals in Washington, D.C.

United Medical Center, formerly Greater Southeast Community Hospital, was a public hospital in Washington D.C. The 330-bed facility was located in the Washington Highlands neighborhood.

In 2016, the government of the District of Columbia awarded a no-bid contract for running the hospital to Veritas, a politically connected firm with limited experience in health care management. While receiving more than $800,000 monthly to manage the hospital, Veritas failed to improve the quality of care. Under Veritas management there were several cases of preventable patient deaths and negligence. The only obstetrics ward east of the Anacostia River was closed by regulators because it could not meet minimum standards. In 2018, following a close vote in the D.C. Council, a new management firm was selected.

Between the 2001 closure of the District of Columbia General Hospital and 2015, UMC was the only general hospital in the southeast quadrant of the District. UMC itself closed on April 15, 2025, upon the opening of the nearby Cedar Hill Regional Medical Center on the campus of St. Elizabeth's Psychiatric Hospital.

== History ==
In 1966, the hospital was founded as a community institution under the name Cafritz Memorial Hospital but after eight years became Greater Southeast. After two bankruptcies, the hospital was acquired by for-profit operator Specialty Hospitals of America in 2008 and renamed United Medical Center.

In 2010, following another bankruptcy of the hospital, the District government took over its management at a public auction. In 2013, a firm specializing in hospital turnarounds, Huron Consulting, deployed dozens of its employees and improved UMC's operating margins. After Huron's contract expired and a long term operator could not be found, in early 2016 the mayor decided the hospital board should invoke its emergency authority to select a new consultant. In March 2016, Veritas was awarded a no bid contract to run the hospital.

The D.C. Council voted in 2019 to close UMC once a planned new hospital nearby opens. That new hospital, Cedar Hill Regional Medical Center, opened on April 15, 2025, and UMC closed the same day.

== Patient care and quality ==
In April 2017, the D.C. Department of Health assessed a $122,000 fine for poor patient care at the hospital's nursing home. In August 2017, a nursing home patient died of myocardial infarction under exceptional circumstances. The patient lay in his own waste and complained that he could not breathe while a nurse stood by, hours before his death. In another incident, the hospital failed to take routine steps to prevent HIV transmission to a newborn. In July 2017, after a patient expired in its care, the hospital lost track of the body.

In August 2017, regulators ordered UMC to stop delivering babies after a number of dangerous mistakes were made, leaving the District without an obstetrics ward east of the Anacostia River. In October 2017, the nurses union voted "no confidence" in the hospital's leadership and said that unsafe nurse-patient ratios and a lack of proper equipment remained unaddressed.

D.C. officials and Health Department Director LaQuandra Nesbitt refused repeated requests to disclose the specific medical lapses that caused the closing of the only obstetrics ward east of the Anacostia River. Council member Vincent Gray, who chairs the DC Council's Health Committee, called the refusal "unacceptable."

== Operations ==
In November 2017, Julian Craig, the top doctor at UMC, was fired after leveling scathing charges about the state of the hospital. Craig accused Veritas of mismanagement and illegal overbilling of federal insurance programs. Craig took the unusual step of appearing before DC Council's Health Committee, where he said that Veritas improperly cut his hours and disregarded hospital procedures that ensured patient safety. To increase revenue, he stated that a Veritas employee encouraged doctors to admit patients who did not need treatment.

Traci Hughes, head of D.C.'s government transparency entity, the Office of Open Government found that the UMC board broke the law when it held a secret discussion and vote over the obstetrics ward. Hughes' contract was not renewed, which activists said was punishment for enforcement of District regulations on government transparency.

UMC Chairman May refused to testify before the D.C. Council, prompting Chairman of the Committee on Health, Vincent Gray, to request subpoena powers. May and the board sought to keep records private where the decision to close the obstetrics ward was discussed.

== Leadership ==
UMC was owned by the District and governed by a board with 11 voting members. The mayor appointed six of the board's members and picked its chairman. Bowser appointed LaRuby May, a political ally who recently lost her seat on the Council of the District of Columbia, as chair.

=== Veritas ===
In 2016, Veritas received a no-bid contract to manage UMC. Veritas was headed by Chrystie Boucree, a member of a well-connected family with close ties to Mayor Muriel Bowser. The husband of Boucree is Corbett Price, who is credited as "executive chairmen" or "senior advisor" to Veritas.

In 1990, Price founded a consulting firm that soon took over the management of Interfaith Medical Center in Brooklyn. Two decades later, the company's management ended after the hospital filed for bankruptcy. Reviews of the hospital found the facility under Price's leadership was "chaotic and disorganized" and that Price should have been more actively engaged. Price's firm was barred from continuing hospital management.

In 2014, Price and associates made over $35,000 in political contributions to Bowser, including $20,000 in contributions to Bowser's inaugural committee. In 2015, Price was appointed to the board of WMATA, the region's public transportation agency, despite having no experience in the field. The contract for Veritas, owned by Price's wife, followed soon after. Price also donated to May, who would later be charged with overseeing Veritas as Chairman of UMC.

In September 2017, the Washington Post reported that Veritas had generated a tenth of the $9 million in extra revenue they had promised while collecting $5 million in taxpayer dollars. Two Veritas managers received an average of more than $7,400 a month to fly back and forth to D.C. from their homes in different states and covered the costs of luxury apartment at National Harbor.
