= Disappearance of Myra Lewis =

Missing child from Mississippi

- Born: Myra Rena Lewis; November 30, 2011
- Disappeared: March 1, 2014 (aged 2); Camden, Mississippi
- Status: Missing for 12 years, 7 months and 12 days
- Height: 3 ft 1 in (0.94 m)
- Parent(s): Ericka and Gregory Lewis

Myra Rena Lewis (born November 30, 2011) went missing at age 2 from her front yard in Camden, Mississippi, on March 1, 2014. She was last seen by family members between 10:30 and 11 in the morning outside her home. Authorities classified Lewis's disappearance as a child abduction case. The Federal Bureau of Investigation quickly became involved, but no trace of Lewis has been found in over a decade since her disappearance.

== Background ==
Myra Lewis was reportedly last seen by her mother, Ericka Lewis, at around 10:30 to 11:00 in the morning on March 1, 2014, at their home on Mount Pilgrim Road in Camden, Mississippi. Ericka Lewis told law enforcement that Myra was playing with her sister outside when she left to go shopping. Ericka Lewis reportedly told Myra and her sister to go inside the home before she left on her errands. Ericka Lewis's husband, Gregory Lewis, was at home at the time, tending to their newborn. Gregory Lewis did not notice that Myra had gone missing for several hours after she was last seen.

=== Search ===
The search for Myra reportedly began between four and five hours after Ericka Lewis last saw her. When Gregory Lewis failed to locate her, he attempted to find her using the family's dogs. The family pets were not trained in search and rescue. After law enforcement became involved, authorities used K-9 support to focus on a four-square-mile area around the Lewis home, which included a pond across from the Lewis home. After an initial search, no sign of Myra Lewis was found.

The day after Lewis's disappearance, on March 2, 2014, Madison County officials issued an Amber alert to raise awareness about her disappearance. Lewis was described as African-American, standing three feet one inch high (94 centimeters) and weighing 27 pounds. She has black hair and brown eyes. When she was last seen, she was described as wearing white or khaki pants, a turquoise sweater with a bear on the front, and pink tennis shoes. Myra Lewis's grandmother described her granddaughter as smart and very obedient. Despite being only two years old, she would walk to her grandmother's house next door to her home.

On March 3, 2014, investigating authorities classified Myra Lewis's disappearance as a child abduction case. Multiple agencies took part in a wide search, but turned up no leads.

On March 7, 2014, after searching the Lewis family home, Myra's mother, Ericka Lewis, was arrested on a probation violation. Critics at the time questioned if authorities’ actions were appropriate given Lewis's daughter's status as a missing person.

On March 10, 2014, the Federal Bureau of Investigation named Lewis to their list of most sought missing persons and announced a reward of up to $20,000 for information regarding her whereabouts. Despite the significant reward, authorities turned up few leads on the case.

On March 13, 2014, divers re-searched the pond across from the Lewis home. The divers turned up nothing.

In May 2014, after 79 days in jail for a probation violation, authorities released Lewis's mother from jail. Upon her release, the Lewis family has been vocal in the media about their assertion that Myra was abducted.

Lacking leads, in October 2014, the Madison County Sheriff's Department turned to psychics to pinpoint a search location. After following the suggestions from the psychics, authorities were unable to turn up any new evidence.

=== Later developments ===
One year after Myra's disappearance, the Lewis family made a public appeal to help find their daughter. The family challenged the delay in releasing Myra's Amber alert, suggesting that if it had been announced to the public sooner, there would have been a better chance of finding her. Today, Myra Lewis is the longest unsolved missing child case to have been issued an Amber alert in Mississippi state history.

In 2018, the National Center for Missing and Exploited Children issued an age-progressed picture of Lewis, who would have then been six years old.

By 2022, eight years after Lewis's disappearance, the Madison County Sheriff's office shared they were no closer to locating Myra Lewis than they were the day she had gone missing. The Lewis family has since left Camden and abandoned the home which Myra disappeared. The National Center for Missing and Exploited Children continues to release age-progressed images of Lewis, and the Federal Bureau of Investigation maintains its reward of $20,000 in pursuit of information about Lewis's case.

As of March 2024, there have been no reliable leads shared to solve her disappearance.

As of 2026 the FBI has reiterated that the up to $20,000 reward is still available for those who come forward with information.

== See also ==
- List of people who disappeared mysteriously (2000–present)
- Disappearance of Relisha Rudd, another child who went missing on the same day as Myra
- Disappearance of Arianna Fitts, another 2-year-old child who went missing two years later
