= Washington Cancer Institute =

- Washington Hospital Center

Geography
- Location: Washington, D.C., United States
- Coordinates: 38°55′46″N 77°0′53″W

History
- Opened: May 9, 1992

Links
- Website: whcenter.org
- Lists: Hospitals in Washington, D.C.

The Washington Cancer Institute (WCI) is Washington, D.C.'s largest cancer care provider, treating more cancer patients than any other program in the nation's capital.

== Overview ==
The Washington Cancer Institute opened on May 9, 1992. Under the leadership of Dr. Sandra Swain, the Cancer Institute diagnosed more than 2,305 new cases during fiscal year 2007. There were more than 79,720 outpatient visits and more than 2,334 inpatient admissions during that period.

== Treatments ==
WCI provides comprehensive, interdisciplinary care including surgical, radiation and medical oncology services as well as counseling for patients and families, cancer education, community outreach program and clinical research trials.

The Center for Breast Health saw 15,242 patients during fiscal year 2007. WCI is affiliated with the Washington Hospital Center.

== See also ==
- Cancer Nursing Practice
