= Disappearance of Relisha Rudd =

American missing persons case

Relisha Rudd
- Born: Relisha Tenau Rudd; October 29, 2005; Washington
- Disappeared: March 1, 2014 (aged 8)
- Status: Missing for 12 years, 8 months and 20 days
- Occupation: Student
- Height: 4 ft 0 in (1.22 m)
- Mother: Shamika Young

Locations
1 days Inn, New York Av

Relisha Tenau Rudd (October 29, 2005 – disappeared March 1, 2014) was an 8-year-old girl who went missing in Washington, D.C., in February 2014 and has not been found. Rudd had been living in the D.C. General Shelter with her mother, when she was befriended by janitor Kahlil Tatum, a former felon. Rudd stopped attending school, but it was 30 days before her absence was reported to police. Investigation revealed that the last sighting of her had been weeks prior when she was caught on camera with Tatum at an area hotel. Tatum's wife was found shot dead in a hotel in Prince George's County, Maryland in mid-March, and at the end of March, searchers found Tatum's body in a shed in the Kenilworth Park and Aquatic Gardens, shot in an apparent suicide.

The case of Relisha Rudd received little coverage outside of the Washington, D.C., area, leading to criticism that her case receives little attention due to her marginalization as a black girl from an impoverished family.

== Disappearance ==
In 2014, Rudd was living with her mother Shamika Young at the D.C. General Shelter. Kahlil Tatum was a 51-year-old janitor at the shelter and had a felony record for burglary, larceny, and breaking-and-entering. Tatum was imprisoned from 1993 to 2003 and again from 2004 to 2011. He was hired as a shelter janitor by the Community Partnership for the Prevention of Homelessness, a contractor which operated the D.C. General Shelter and reportedly "other city homeless programs". Tatum was known for inappropriately fraternizing with shelter residents and for paying particular attention to young girls. Tatum befriended Young, bought her daughter a tablet, and took her to see Disney on Ice. Eventually Young allowed Tatum to take the girl away overnight, allegedly to stay with him and his granddaughter.

Rudd suddenly stopped attending school in February, but her grandmother Melissa Young provided a note saying she was having health problems and was in the care of a "Dr. Tatum". The school contacted Tatum at the number provided, but when he failed to show up for a meeting with them, a counselor contacted the police to report Rudd missing. The Metropolitan Police Department of the District of Columbia launched a missing-persons probe on March 19, by which point Rudd had not been in school for a month.

The investigation revealed that Tatum and Rudd had been caught on camera walking down a hallway in a Holiday Inn Express in Northeast Washington, D.C., on February 26, and footage on March 1 showed her walking with Tatum to a room in a Days Inn on New York Avenue in D.C. The March 1 footage proved to be the last proof that Rudd was still alive.

== Deaths of Andrea and Kahlil Tatum ==
Tatum's wife Andrea was found shot in the head in a motel in Prince George's County, Maryland on the same day Rudd was reported missing (March 20). Surveillance tapes showed Andrea and Kahlil Tatum entering the hotel room the night before. Kahlil Tatum was last seen March 2, the day after Rudd was last seen, while buying a shovel, lime, and 42-gallon trash bags. DC police obtained an arrest warrant for Kahlil Tatum in his wife's murder, but on March 31, Tatum's body was found in a shed in Kenilworth Park, dead of apparent suicide by the same gun that killed his wife.

== Theories ==
There are a limited number of theories for what happened to Rudd, given Tatum's behavior and murder-suicide shortly after her disappearance. Authorities generally believe that Rudd was either murdered by Tatum or sold by her mother Shamika and stepfather Antonio Wheeler to a sex-trafficking crime organization, although the sex trafficking theory has been ruled out by DC Metropolitan Police Detectives. There are also theories from the stepfather and other relatives that Rudd is still alive, since her body was never found. In an interview with The Washington Post, a senior law-enforcement official suspected that Tatum had been sexually exploiting Relisha and possibly pimping her to others, and may have killed his wife due to her finding out about his activities. Another theory is that Ricky Sheridan Lyles Sr., who was Tatum's brother-in-law, might have been involved and could have killed Tatum. Lyles was questioned but ruled out as a person of interest.

== See also ==
- List of people who disappeared mysteriously: post-1970
- Disappearance of Myra Lewis, another child who went missing on the same day as Relisha
