= George Washington University Hospital =

Hospital in Washington, D.C., United States

The George Washington University Hospital
- Universal Health Services

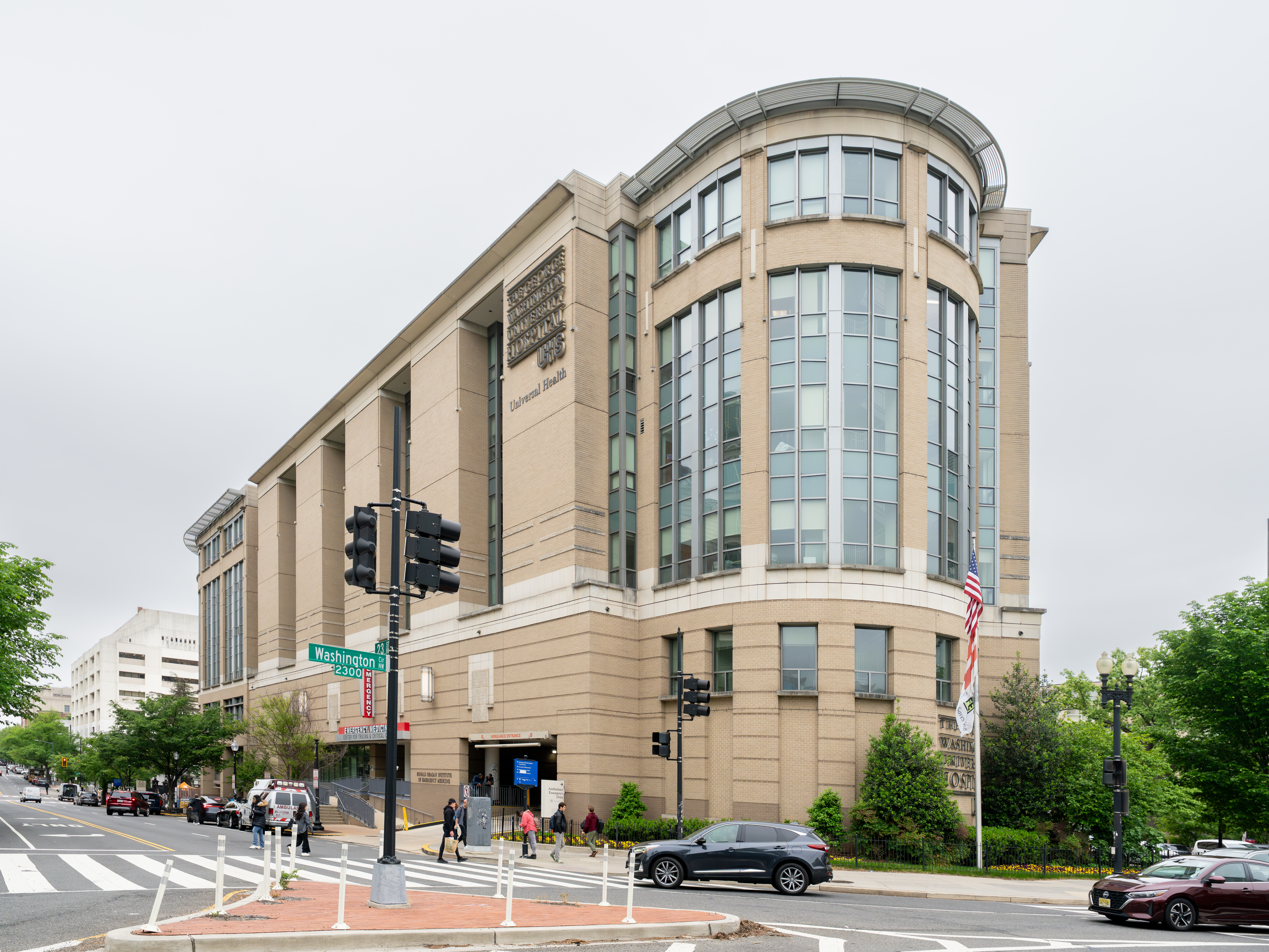
- The George Washington University Hospital in 2026

Geography
- Location: 900 23rd Street NW, Washington, D.C., United States
- Coordinates: 38.9012°N 77.0506°W

Organization
- Affiliated university: George Washington University School of Medicine and Health Sciences

Services
- Standards: Joint Commission
- Emergency department: Level I trauma center
- Beds: 395

Helipads
- Helipad: FAA LID: 24DC

History
- Founded: 1824 (operations); August 23, 2002 (current building)

Links
- Website: gwhospital.com
- Lists: Hospitals in Washington, D.C.

The George Washington University Hospital (GWUH) is a short-stay hospital in Washington, D.C. affiliated with the George Washington University School of Medicine and Health Sciences. Since 2022, the hospital has been wholly owned and operated by Universal Health Services, though it maintains significant ties with George Washington University (GWU).

The current 400,000 ft^{2} (37,200 m^{2}) facility was opened on August 23, 2002. It has 395 beds, holds over $45 million worth of medical equipment, and cost over $96 million to construct. The hospital is licensed by the District of Columbia Department of Consumer and Regulatory Affairs and accredited by the U.S. Joint Commission.

Kimberly (Kim) Russo was the chief executive officer of GWUH from June 2016, until she stepped down in April 2025. She previously served as the chief operating officer for seven years. GWU's plans to fill the position are currently unknown.

== History ==
Founded in 1824 as a medical department in Columbian College (now called the George Washington University), the GW Medical School was the 11th medical school in the United States and the first in the nation's capital.

- 1824 The first GW medical department was located in downtown Washington, D.C., on 10th and E Streets near Ford's Theatre. In the 1840s, it moved into a larger building at Judiciary Square as an infirmary, which subsequently became the first general hospital in the nation's capital.
- 1853 When the GW Infirmary was enlarged to allow the curriculum to formally include clinical studies, which meant that the college became one of the first in the nation to teach clinical medicine.
- 1861 The infirmary was reclaimed by the government for use as a military hospital for Civil War casualties and was destroyed by fire shortly thereafter.
- 1863 The medical college reopened, post-fire, in the Constitution Office on E Street.
- 1868 The hospital and medical school are moved to the former location of the Army Medical Museum's specimens, 1335 H Street.
- 1904 The Columbian University Medical School and Hospital were rededicated to The George Washington University Medical School and Hospital. At this time, the faculty boasted many of the nation's most prominent doctors, including Major Walter Reed, who identified the mosquito as the carrier of yellow fever; Dr. Theobald Smith, whose pioneering research identifying germs as the cause of diseases influenced the medical industry; and Dr. Frederick F. Russell, who introduced the typhoid vaccine into the Army.
- 1928 The Department of Medicine became the School of Medicine, the School of Nursing, and the University Hospital.
- 1948 The GW Hospital moved to Foggy Bottom at 901 23rd Street (directly across from present location) and housed 501 patient beds. At the time of its dedication, it was the largest private building in the District of Columbia.
- 1981 President Ronald Reagan rushed to GW's Emergency Department after an assassination attempt, suffering from gunshot wounds in the chest and in the lower right arm. The center is later renamed for Reagan, who survived the assassination attempt.
- 1996 The GW Medical Faculty Associates' mobile mammography program aims to make life-saving early detection of breast cancer possible for all women in D.C., Maryland, and Virginia, regardless of their ability to pay. This program is still being offered today. The program has since increased access to minorities, low-income communities, and the uninsured.
- 1997 Universal Health Services buys an 80% stake in the hospital and takes over day-to-day operations from the university. Previously Tenet Healthcare Corporation attempted to buy 80% of GW hospital for $80 million.
- 2002 GW Hospital moves across the street to 900 23rd Street, NW. The 371-bed facility is the first new hospital in D.C. in over 20 years.
- 2019 GW Hospital opens their new rooftop helipad constructed on the existing hospital facility that originally opened in 2002. The approval for this to be added required overturning an existing D.C law which had been in place since the 1980s that prohibited the construction of any new helipads within the District. The newly revised law allows for Level I Trauma Centers to construct and operate these facilities. The helipad is used by private companies such as PHI and STAT medevac for transfers of critically ill patients from outside hospitals in need of specialty trauma, cardiac, or neurological care. Critical trauma patients may also be transported directly from accident scenes by United States Park Police eagle helicopters or Maryland State Police that operate medevac flights within the D.C region.
- 2022 Universal Health Services bought the remaining 20% stake in the hospital from the university, becoming the sole owner of it. Ties between the university and UHS remain, including the university's School of Medicine and Health Sciences being the hospital's official academic partner and GW Medical Faculty Associates, a physician network, remaining its clinical care partner. The transaction cost $54 million, most of which the university used to expand its medicine, health and science faculty.
- 2024 GW Hospital opened The Grace Anne Dorney Pulmonary Rehabilitation Clinic. Funding for the clinic was provided by Ted Koppel and his wife, Grace Anne Dorney Koppel. This clinic is the 11th pulmonary rehabilitation clinic the couple has helped fund.

== Services ==
=== Emergency medicine ===
The Ronald Reagan Institute of Emergency Medicine was established at George Washington University in 1991. The department cares for nearly 85,000 patients each year, including serious injuries, as a level 1 trauma center.

GWUH's emergency department consists of:

- 52 emergency department beds
- 2 trauma bays
- 6 critical care stabilization bays
- 5 negative-pressure isolation rooms
- 12 fast-track treatment rooms

=== Center for trauma and critical care ===
The George Washington University Hospital is an American College of Surgeons (ACS) verified level 1 trauma center GWUH receives the most critically-injured trauma patients from Washington, D.C., and the Northern Virginia area, as well as hospital transfers from Maryland, Virginia, and West Virginia. In 2018, the hospital was approved to construct a helipad after a multi-year battle to change a DC law prohibiting the construction of new helipads. The addition of this ability to receive helicopters greatly shortens the time needed to transfer critically ill patients from another hospital, or directly from an emergency scene, to receive the highest level of care for critically ill patients.

Cardiovascular center

GWUH is home to a comprehensive program for advanced treatment of heart disease and vascular disorders, non-invasive diagnostics, 24-hour interventional cardiologist and catheterization lab, cardiac catheterization, heart rhythm disorders and treatments and cardiovascular surgery.

Comprehensive stroke center

GWUH is home to a comprehensive stroke center offering 24-hour acute stroke services treating ischemic strokes, hemorrhagic strokes, and subarachnoid hemorrhage. Stroke care is provided via a team-based approach with teams composed of vascular neurologists, neurointerventionalists, neurosurgeons, intensivists, neuroradiologists, physiatrists, and other specialists as determined by patient requirements. GW hospital houses an acute rehabilitation unit, thus allowing stroke victims to receive all of their care in one location. And, in 2024, Newsweek ranked this program first in the South for stroke care, marking its third consecutive year in the position.
