= MedStar Washington Hospital Center =

Coordinates: 38.93°N 77.02°W

- MedStar Health
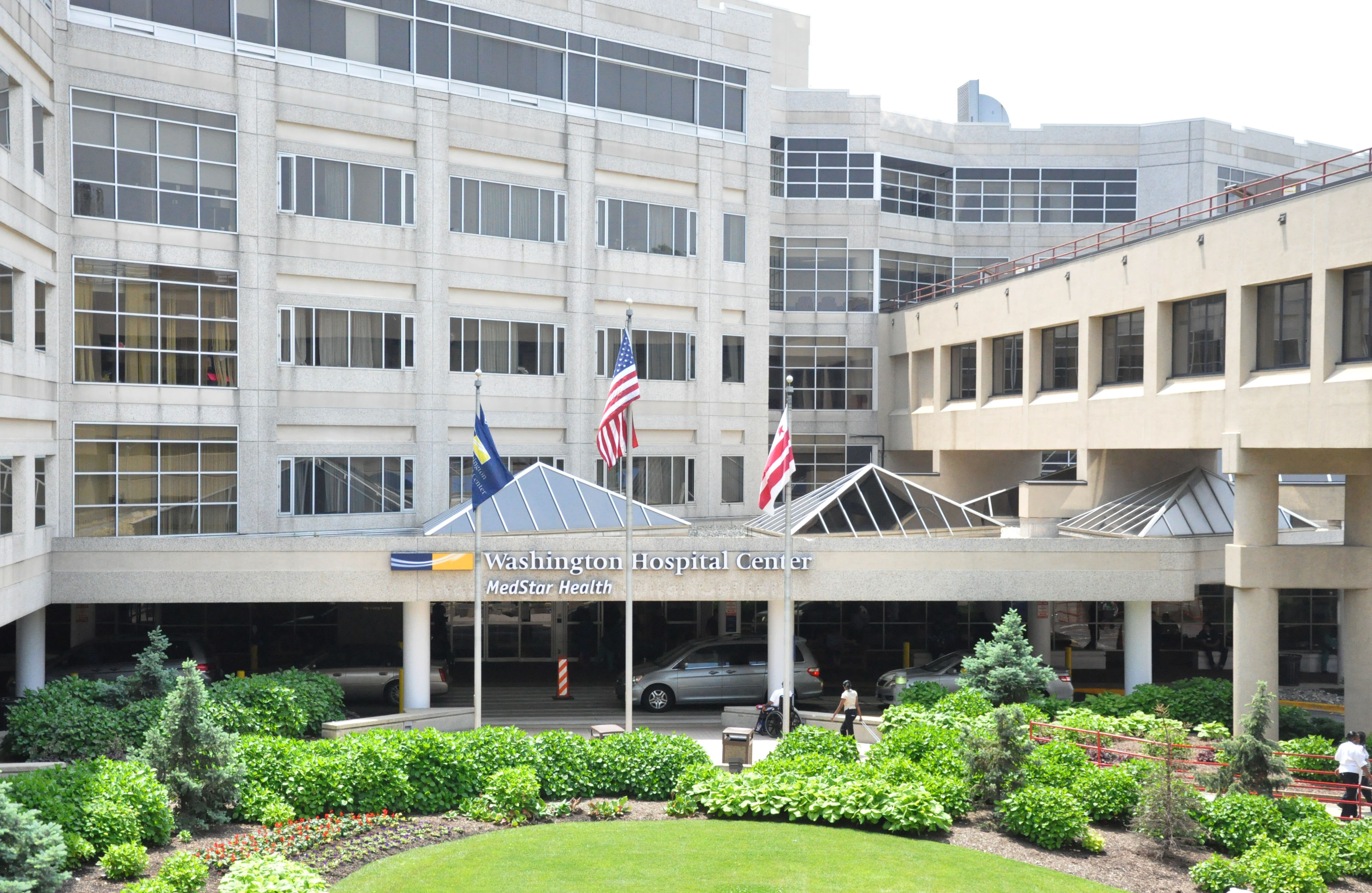

Geography
- Location: 110 Irving Street, NW, Washington, D.C., United States

Organization
- Care system: Private not-for-profit
- Type: Teaching
- Affiliated university: Georgetown University School of Medicine

Services
- Emergency department: Level I trauma center
- Beds: 926

History
- Opened: March 10, 1958

Links
- Website: http://MedStarWashington.org
- Lists: Hospitals in Washington, D.C.

MedStar Washington Hospital Center is the largest not-for-profit Hospital in Washington, D.C.. It is a member of MedStar Health, licensed for 926 beds, and a teaching hospital for Georgetown University School of Medicine.

The Hospital Center occupies a 47-acre (19 ha) campus in Northwest Washington that it shares with three other medical facilities. Immediately adjacent to MedStar Washington Hospital Center are the National Rehabilitation Hospital and the central branch of Children's National Medical Center.

== History ==
After about six months of discussions with local citizens, four members of Congress, led by Senator Millard Tydings of Maryland, first proposed what would become Washington Hospital Center in 1944, in order to relieve overcrowding at the city's hospitals at the time. The legislation proposed that a 1,500-bed hospital would be built with federal government funds following the conclusion of World War II, incorporating Garfield Hospital and the Episcopal Eye, Ear and Throat Hospital. Other city hospitals were welcomed to join in the new facility in exchange for deeding their old locations to the federal government. President Harry S. Truman signed Hospital Center Act authorizing the hospital in 1946, by which time the Central Dispensary and Emergency Center had agreed to join in on the effort as well. It was expected to cost up to $20 million.

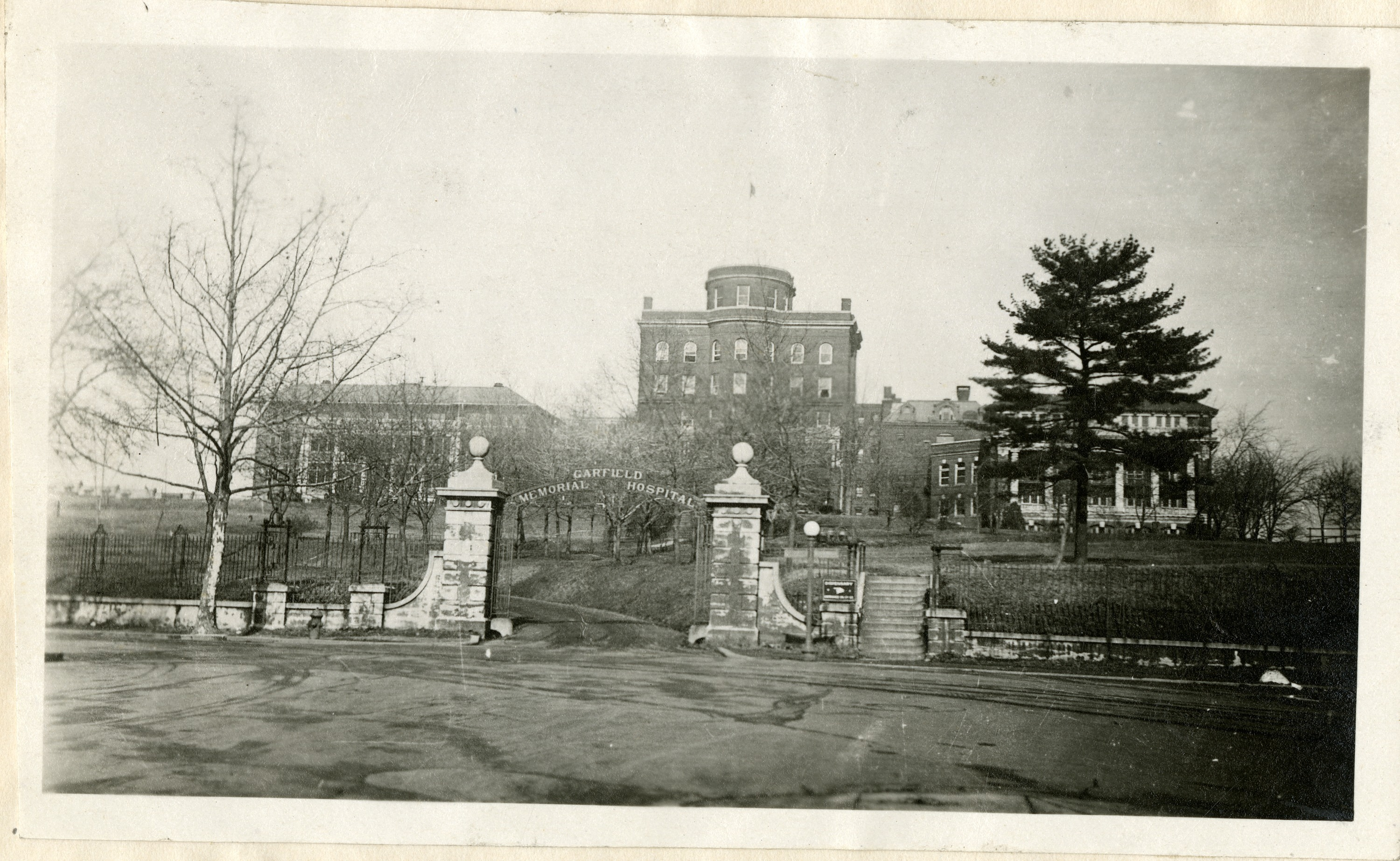
Garfield Memorial Hospital, one of Washington Hospital Center's predecessors, on Florida Avenue NW and 11th Street NW in 1919.

The hospital was to be located on land owned by the federal government. A committee assembled to find a location initially supported using the campus of the United States Naval Observatory, since the Navy had planned to move its operations to near Charlottesville, Virginia. That plan changed in 1950, when Congress decided not to fund the Naval Observatory's relocation. Instead, the hospital center was given 47 acres of the U. S. Soldiers' and Airmen's Home's land, which was being leased at the time to a dairy farm. The Naval Observatory remained at its site on Massachusetts Avenue Northwest; in 1974, Congress designated Number One Observatory Circle, then the residence of the chief of naval operations, to be the official residence of the vice president of the United States.

After delays due to budget constraints, construction started on the hospital in 1953. It opened on March 10, 1958, at a final cost of $22 million.

On May 7, 1998, Medlantic Healthcare Group, the Hospital Center's not-for-profit parent company, merged with Helix Health, a group of four Baltimore, MD-based hospitals, making the combined company the largest health care provider in the mid-Atlantic region. Helix/Medlantic was renamed MedStar Health on February 1, 1999.

== Overview ==
The Washington Hospital Center Heart program is a national leader in the research, diagnosis, and treatment of cardiovascular disease; its angioplasty or cardiac catheterization has the largest volume of PCI cases in the nation within the University HealthSystem Consortium (UHC). One of the Washington area's first heart transplants was done at the Hospital Center on May 22, 1987. Washington Hospital Center is home to Washington's only 256-slice Cardiac CT scanner and has the only onsite 24/7 cardiac catheterization team in the region. Its Ventricular Assist Device program is certified by The Joint Commission. Recently, the MedStar Heart Institute at Washington Hospital Center has forged an alliance with the Cleveland Clinic Sydell and Arnold Miller Family Heart & Vascular Institute.

In addition to its cardiac care specialties, the Hospital Center is respected as a top facility in other areas including cancer, neurosciences, gastrointestinal disorders, endocrinology, women's services, transplantation and burn. MedStar Washington Hospital Center's neurosciences program offers the full range of surgical and minimally invasive treatment and operates the first JCAHO-accredited Primary Stroke Center in the District. The Hospital Center is home to the region's adult burn center.

The Washington Cancer Institute (WCI) is the District's largest cancer care provider, treating more cancer patients than any other program in the nation's capital. The Cancer Institute diagnosed more than 2,494 new cases during fiscal year 2008. There were more than 76,464 outpatient visits and more than 2,352 inpatient admissions during that period. WCI provides comprehensive, interdisciplinary care including surgical, radiation, robotic and medical oncology services as well as counseling for patients and families, cancer education, community outreach program and clinical research trials. The Cancer Institute is home to the area's only Gamma Knife and also has the Trilogy Linear Accelerator.

The Hospital Center's transplantation program ranks among the top five percent in the nation for patient outcomes and consistently exceeds the national average. The program for kidney, pancreas and heart is one of the busiest in the mid-Atlantic region.

Perhaps the Hospital Center's most wide-reaching presence is its MedSTAR Transport air ambulance service, which, as of 2008 had carried nearly 50,000 patients since its inception in 1983. The American College of Surgeons consistently recognizes the MedSTAR Trauma program as one of the nation's best Level I shock/trauma units.

== Statistics ==
In fiscal year 2011, 40,192 inpatients were served—including 4,079 births—and 411,514 outpatients. The Hospital Center has a medical/dental staff of 1,407. There were nearly 25,000 cardiac catheterization procedures performed during FY 2012. There were 1,670 open-heart surgeries and ten heart transplants performed during the fiscal year 2011.

There were 108 kidney transplants, four combination kidney/pancreas transplants and no pancreas transplant performed during fiscal year 2011. There were 2,157 helicopter transports and 705 trauma unit visits in FY 2011. There were 87,114 Emergency Department visits. Washington Hospital Center provided over $22 million in charity care during FY 2011.

== Rankings ==
In 2024, the MedStar Washington Hospital Center was ranked #38 for Cardiology & Heart Surgery by U.S. News & World Report.

Washington Hospital Center was the only D.C. hospital to be ranked in the areas of cardiology and heart surgery in 2012/13 by U.S. News & World Report. Only 148 medical centers in the U.S. were ranked in one or more of 16 specialties designated in U.S. News & World Report's survey. The Washington, D.C., metropolitan area, of which the Washington Hospital Center is a part, includes Alexandria and Arlington County, Virginia, and Bethesda and Rockville, Maryland. There are 59 hospitals in this area, and of these, the Washington Hospital Center is ranked number two, just below Inova Fairfax Hospital.

== ER One ==
ER One is a prototype hospital envisioned for the Washington, D.C., area. The hospital is an all-scenarios facility, designed to handle, for example, a huge influx of contaminated patients from a terrorist attack. The emergency department can accommodate 220 patients in 24 hours, a figure that can easily double in emergency situations. ER One is capable of managing chemical, biological, explosive, and radiological catastrophes.

Additionally, ER One is a research facility, not just for doing research in the traditional hospital research sense, but as a prototype hospital, in order to research the very design of hospitals.

Design elements include mass decontamination, surge capacity, and preparedness for other emergencies such as an outbreak of bird flu. The emergency department (ED) has added a lab located in the ED to expedite blood tests, ten large examination rooms that will hold three patients each, negative pressure capability to prevent potentially contagious air from escaping an examination room, and sterilization using vaporized hydrogen peroxide.

== AMALGA ==
The Washington Hospital Center's homegrown Azyxxi healthcare software was purchased by Microsoft in July 2006.
