= District of Columbia General Hospital =

Former hospital in Washington, D.C.

Geography
- Location: 1900 Massachusetts Avenue SE, Washington, D.C., U.S.
- Coordinates: 38°53′7.70″N 76°58′27.96″W

Organisation
- Type: Public hospital

History
- Former name: Washington Infirmary
- Opened: 1806
- Closed: 2001

Links
- Lists: Hospitals in U.S.

The District of Columbia General Hospital, commonly known as DC General Hospital, was a hospital located in the Hill East neighborhood of Washington, D.C. It was operational from 1806 to its closing by mayor Anthony A. Williams in 2001 as the city was trying to cut costs while recovering from bankruptcy. At the time of its closure, it was the only public hospital located within the District.

== History ==
The hospital was founded as the Washington Infirmary in 1806, using a $2,000 grant from Congress, and was located at 6th and M Street NW.

In 1846, the hospital moved from its original location at Judiciary Square to 19th and Massachusetts Avenue SE in 1846. At the turn of the century, efforts to open a new public hospital at 14th and Upshur were opposed by residents. The final hospital site was first developed in the 1840s as a consolidated hospital, poorhouse and workhouse complex known as the Washington Asylum Hospital. It was renamed Gallinger Municipal Hospital in 1922, after U.S. Senator Jacob Harold Gallinger. In 1994, the Washington City Paper described the hospital as a "poorhouse" that provided de facto universal health care to those with no alternative.

== Post-closure ==
Shortly after its closure, the facility was used as a homeless shelter, with a capacity of around 270 families.

In 2014, 8-year old Relisha Rudd went missing after her family was staying in the facility. In the days before her disappearance she was seen with a janitor from the facility who killed his wife and a few days after, himself.

In 2016, Mayor Muriel Bowser announced a plan to replace the D.C. General shelter with six smaller facilities located around the city while transitioning families to subsidized housing. D.C. General was officially closed by Mayor Bowser on October 30, 2018.

Reservation 13, the area encompassing the hospital site, was offered as part of Washington's bid to host Amazon HQ2.
