= List of hospitals in Washington, D.C. =

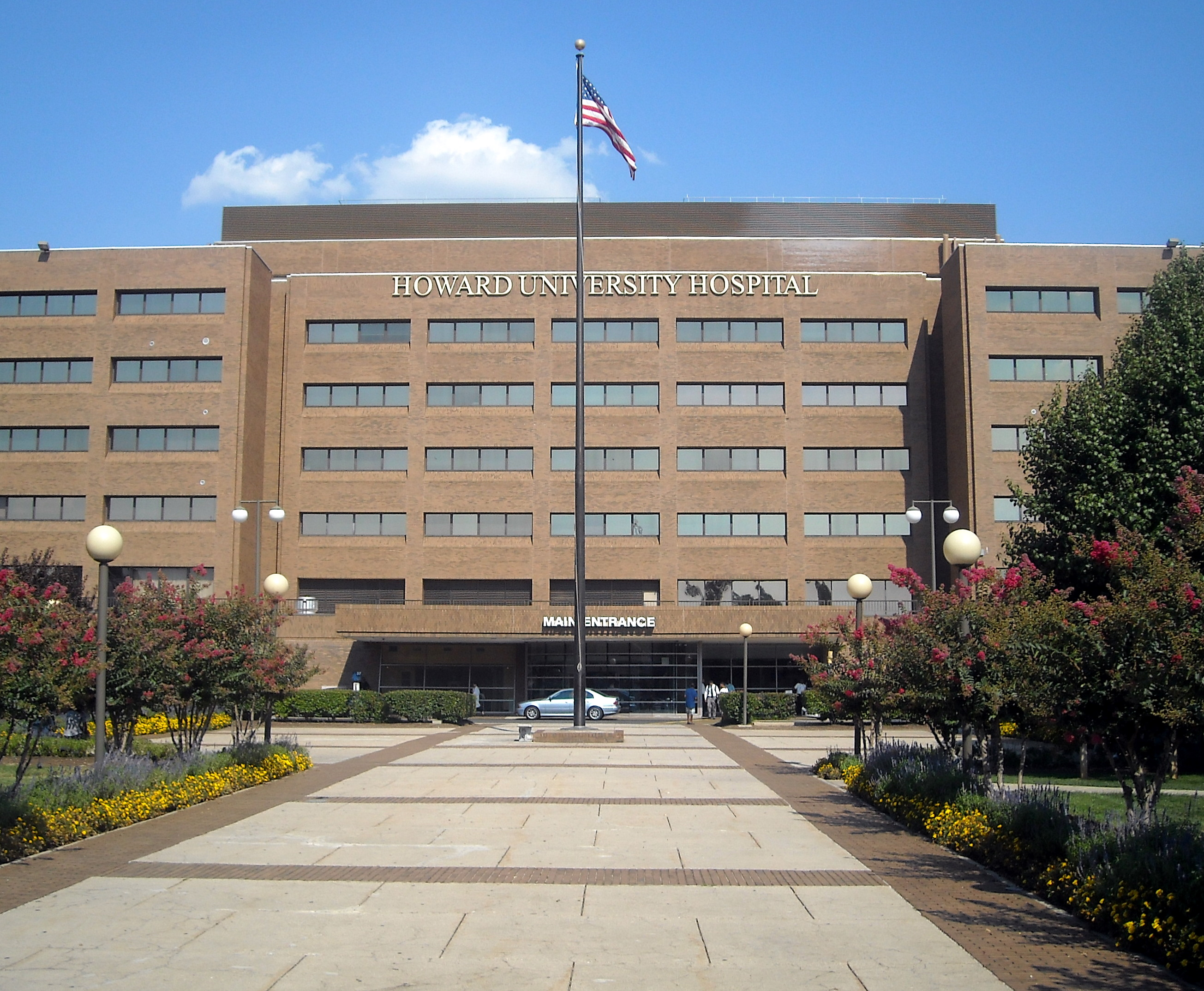
Howard University Hospital

This is a list of hospitals in Washington, D.C., as of December 2009.

== Hospitals for members of the public ==
There are a mix of non-profit public, for-profit private, and non-profit private hospitals in the District of Columbia. These hospitals provide care to all members of the public.

- Cedar Hill Regional Medical Center
- Children's National Medical Center
- George Washington University Hospital
- Howard University Hospital
- MedStar Georgetown University Hospital
- MedStar National Rehabilitation Hospital
- MedStar Washington Hospital Center
- Psychiatric Institute of Washington
- Sibley Memorial Hospital
- BridgePoint Specialty Hospital of Washington - Capitol Hill
- BridgePoint Specialty Hospital of Washington - Hadley
- St. Elizabeths Hospital
- Cedar Hill Regional Medical Center

Former:

- Providence Hospital (Closed as of 2019)
- United Medical Center (Closed as of 2025. Opened in 1966 as Cafritz Memorial Hospital; also formerly known as Greater Southeast Community Hospital)

== Military hospitals ==
There is one hospital within the District of Columbia which offers care solely to members of the United States military, their families, and to veterans. This facility is owned and operated by the U.S. federal government and are generally not utilized by members of the public unless the individual falls into one of the categories served.

- Washington DC Veterans Affairs Medical Center
