= Children's National Hospital =

Hospital in Washington, D.C., United States

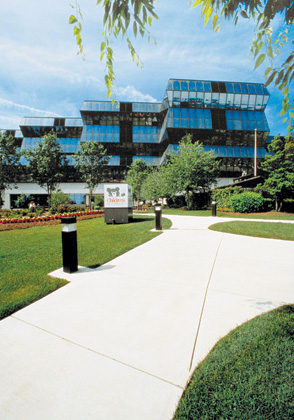
- The Sheikh Zayed Campus of Children's National Hospital

Geography
- Location: 111 Michigan Ave. NW, Washington, D.C., Washington, D.C., United States
- Coordinates: 38.927291°N 77.014418°W

Organization
- Care system: Commercial, Medicaid
- Funding: Non-profit hospital
- Type: Children's teaching hospital, Community hospital
- Affiliated university: The George Washington University

Services
- Emergency department: Pediatric Level I Trauma Center
- Beds: 303

History
- Opened: 1870

Links
- Website: www.childrensnational.org
- Lists: Hospitals in Washington, D.C.

Children's National Hospital (formerly Children's National Health System, DC Children's Hospital, Children's National Medical Center) is a freestanding, 323-bed, pediatric acute care children's hospital located in Washington, D.C. It is affiliated with the George Washington University School of Medicine and the Howard University College of Medicine. The hospital provides comprehensive pediatric specialties and subspecialties to infants, children, teens, and young adults aged 0–21 throughout the region. The hospital features an ACS verified level I pediatric trauma center, the only one in the District of Columbia. Its pediatric intensive care unit and neonatal intensive care units serve the region. The hospital also has a rooftop helipad for critical pediatric transport.

Michelle Riley-Brown took over as CEO on July 1, 2023, replacing Dr. Kurt Newman, who retired after leading the organization for 12 years.

== Services and programs ==
Division of Oncology: The Division of Oncology at Children's National Hospital has access to Children's Oncology Group's Phase I trials and Pediatric Brain Tumor Consortium protocols.

Children's National Heart Institute: The institute is made up of the departments of Cardiology, Cardiac Surgery, Cardiac Intensive Care, and Cardiac Anesthesia. Cardiologists, cardiac surgeons, interventionalists, cardiac intensivists, anesthesiologists, and fetal heart specialists care for a wide range of congenital heart problems.

Children's National Division of Neurosurgery: The Division of Neurology at Children's National treats a range of pediatric conditions, including autism, brain tumors, epilepsy, headaches, learning disabilities, migraines, movement disorders, neonatal neurology, neurogenetic diseases, neuromuscular diseases, stroke, and white matter diseases.

Children's National Neonatal Intensive Care Unit (NICU): Within this division is one of the level IV NICUs in the Washington, D.C., area, providing care for premature and ill newborns.

Children's National Research Institute: Children's National Research Institute is a pediatric research institution.

Children's National Infectious Disease Division: The Division of Infectious Disease has physicians and fellows providing care to the area with Lyme disease, Zika virus, and other complicated infectious disease issues in the hospital. The division also contains a separate Transplant Infectious Disease division which cares for critically ill transplant patients, including heart, bone marrow, kidney, and gastrointestinal tract. A partnership also exists with the National Institute of Allergy and Infectious Diseases and ID division where internal medicine-pediatric infectious disease fellows rotate and collaborate on research projects.

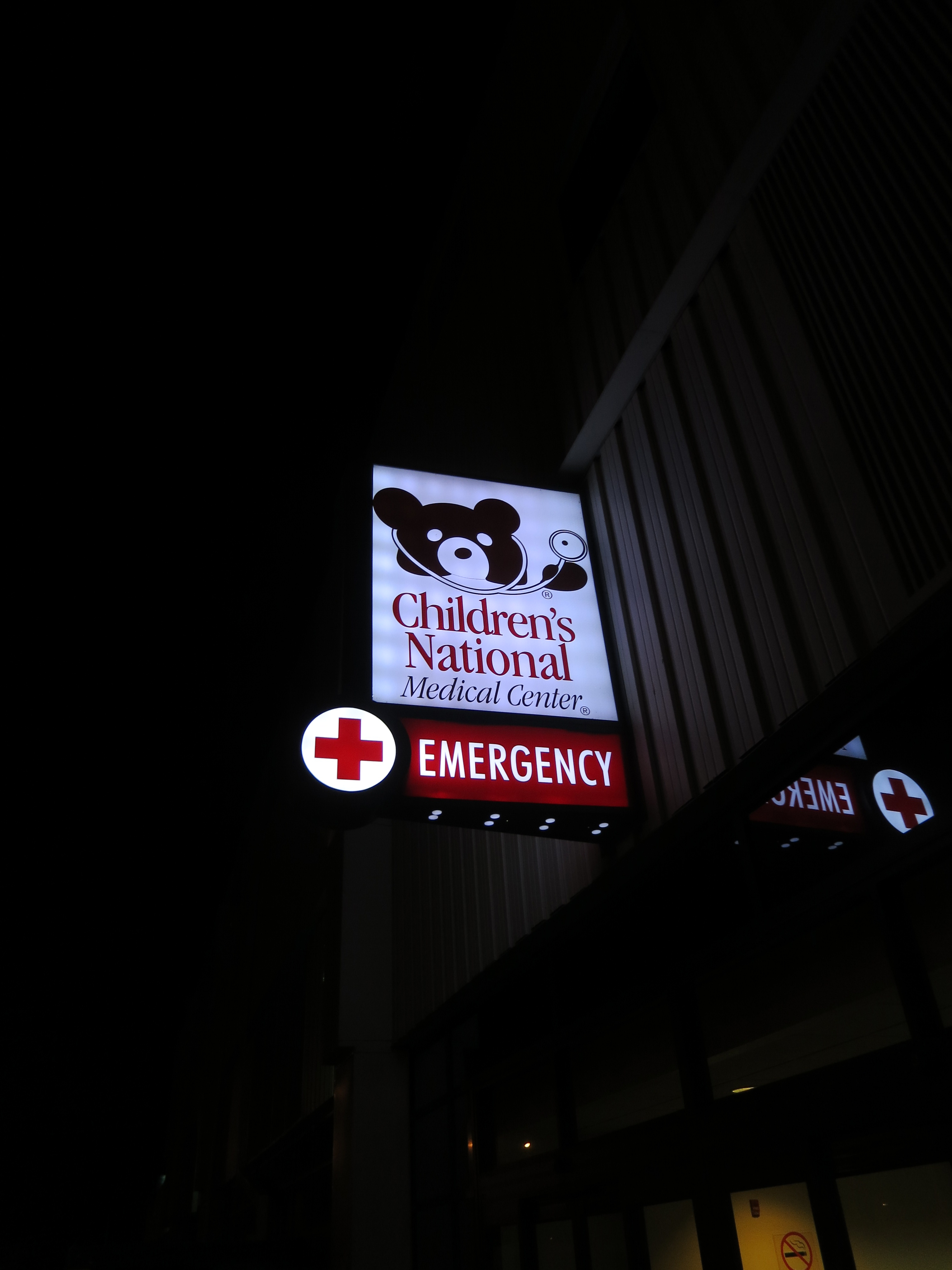
A picture of the sign in front of the emergency room at Children's National Hospital.

== The Night Before Christmas ==
Annually, the First Lady visits the Hospital each December with Santa Claus to read the book "The Night Before Christmas". This convention has been maintained by First Ladies since Bess Truman.

== Gender-affirming care harassment campaign ==
On August 25, 2022, right-wing Twitter account Libs of TikTok published a recording of phone operators at the Children's National Hospital, who incorrectly suggested that a 16-year-old transgender boy could be eligible for a hysterectomy at the hospital's gender development clinic. One employee claimed that even younger patients are eligible for a hysterectomy. Right-wing media outlets, including Fox News and The Daily Caller, published articles about the recording. A spokeswoman for the hospital stated: "None of the people who were secretly recorded by this activist group deliver care to our patients. We do not and have never performed gender-affirming hysterectomies for anyone under the age of 18." The hospital's website, in error, had previously stated that hysterectomies were provided to patients "between the ages of 0-21". The hospital has received harassment and "a large volume of hostile and threatening phone calls and emails", as well as bomb threats. As of September 2, 2022, the recording has been viewed more than 1.1 million times on Twitter.

When contacted by The Washington Post, Raichik did not answer a question about whether she felt responsible for the threats made against the hospitals she tweeted about, including Children's National Hospital, but said that "we 100% condemn any acts/threats of violence".

== See also ==
- Emergency Medical Services for Children
